= Haystack Mountain (Wyoming) =

Mountain peak in Wyoming, US

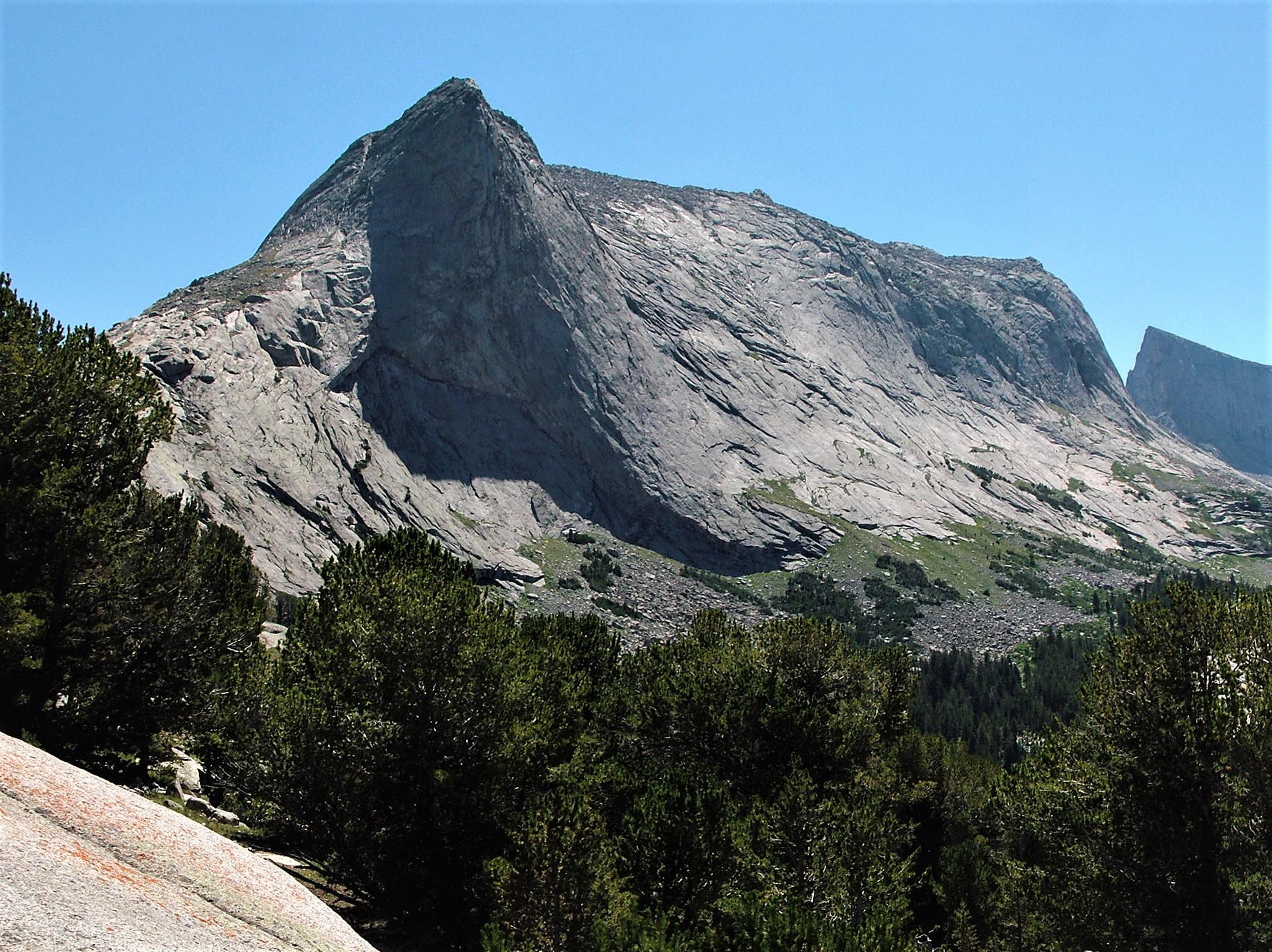
- North aspect

Highest point
- Elevation: 11,978 ft (3,651 m)
- Prominence: 538 ft (164 m)
- Parent peak: Steeple Peak (12,040 ft)
- Isolation: 1.22 mi (1.96 km)
- Coordinates: 42°43′54″N 109°09′59″W

Geography
- Location within Wyoming Location within the United States
- Location: Sublette County, Wyoming, U.S.
- Parent range: Wind River Range
- Topo map: USGS Temple Peak

Geology
- Rock type: granite

Climbing
- Easiest route: class 4 Grassy Goat Route

Haystack Mountain is an 11,978-foot-elevation (3,651-meter) mountain summit located in Sublette County of Wyoming, United States.

== Geography ==
The mile-long peak is situated in the remote Wind River Range, one mile west of the Continental Divide, and approximately four miles southeast of the Cirque of the Towers. It is set in the Bridger Wilderness, on land managed by Bridger-Teton National Forest. Topographic relief is significant as the northwest aspect rises nearly 2,000 feet (610 meters) above Clear Lake in one-half mile. Neighbors include Schiestler Peak, 1.9 mile to the west, Big Sandy Mountain 1.5 mile north, and East Temple Peak 1.6 mile south. Access is via a half-day hike on the Big Sandy Trail. Precipitation runoff from the mountain drains into headwaters of the Big Sandy River, which is a tributary of the Green River.

== Climate ==
According to the Köppen climate classification system, Haystack Mountain is located in an alpine subarctic climate zone with long, cold, snowy winters, and cool to warm summers. Due to its altitude, it receives precipitation all year, as snow in winter, and as thunderstorms in summer.

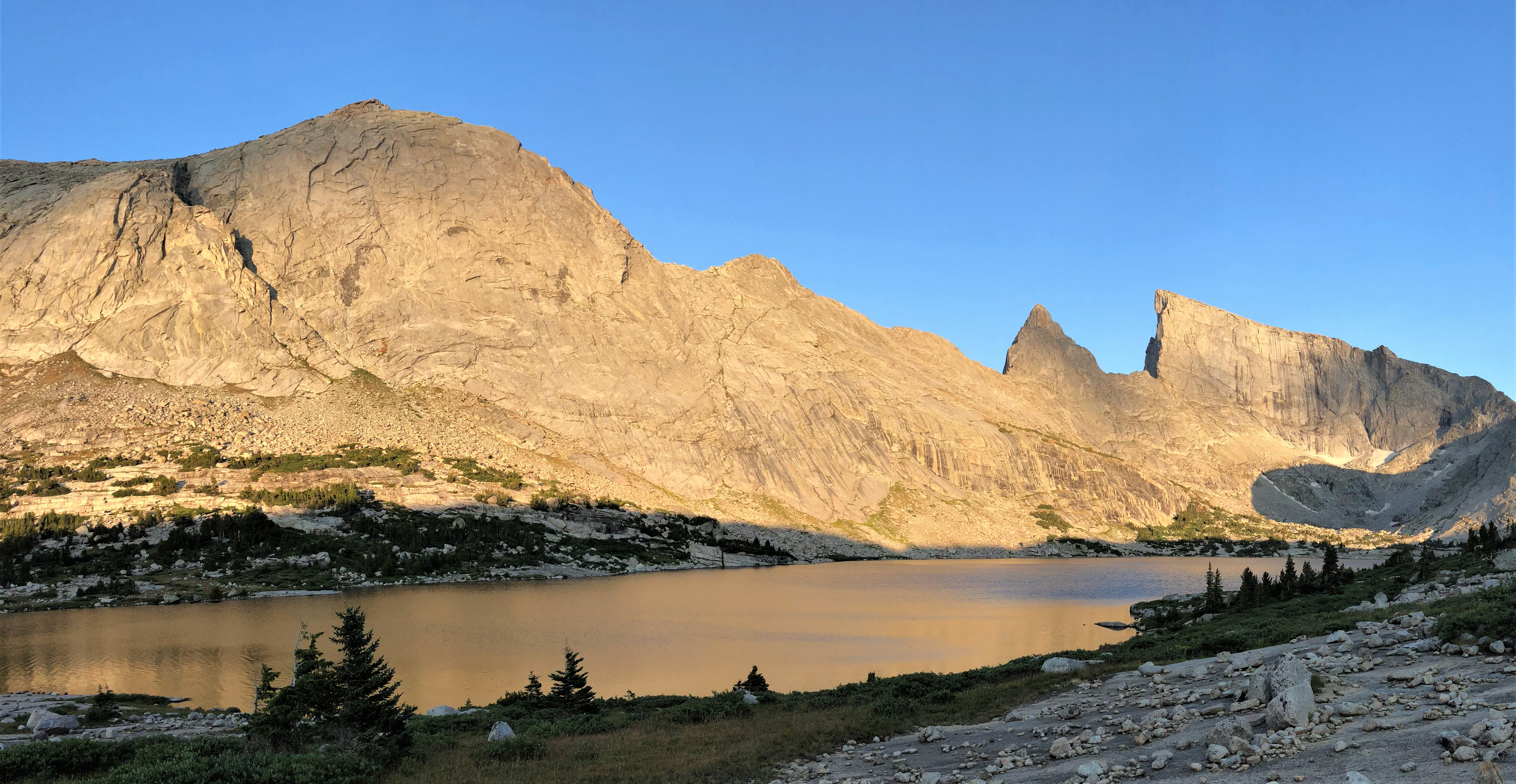
Haystack Mountain (left), Deep Lake, and East Temple Peak (right)

== Climbing ==
A partial list of the 17 established climbing routes on Haystack's popular granite walls:

- North Gully – (class 5.2)
- North Face – (II 5.6) – 1958 – Jack Curtin and John Wells
- Minor Dihedral – (III 5.9) – 1964 – Pete Croff, Phil Fowler, Richard Schori
- Major Dihedral – (IV 5.9+) – 1964 – Fred Beckey, Jerry Fuller
- Flashflood – (II 5.9) – 1969 – Harvey Carter, James Ebert
- Railroad Tracks – (III 5.8) – 1973 – Joe Kelsey, Bill St. Jean
- Central Corner – (III 5.9) – 1973 – Elaine Mathews, Stuart Phillips
- Southern Wall Left – (IV 5.10c) – 1974 – Joe Kelsey, Dave Loeks, Dick Williams
- Seams Thin – (IV 5.10d) – 1995 – Tim Wolfe, Chris Abbott
- Pika Alliteration – (II 5.8) – 2010 – Jared Spaulding, Jake Koplen, Jackson Smith

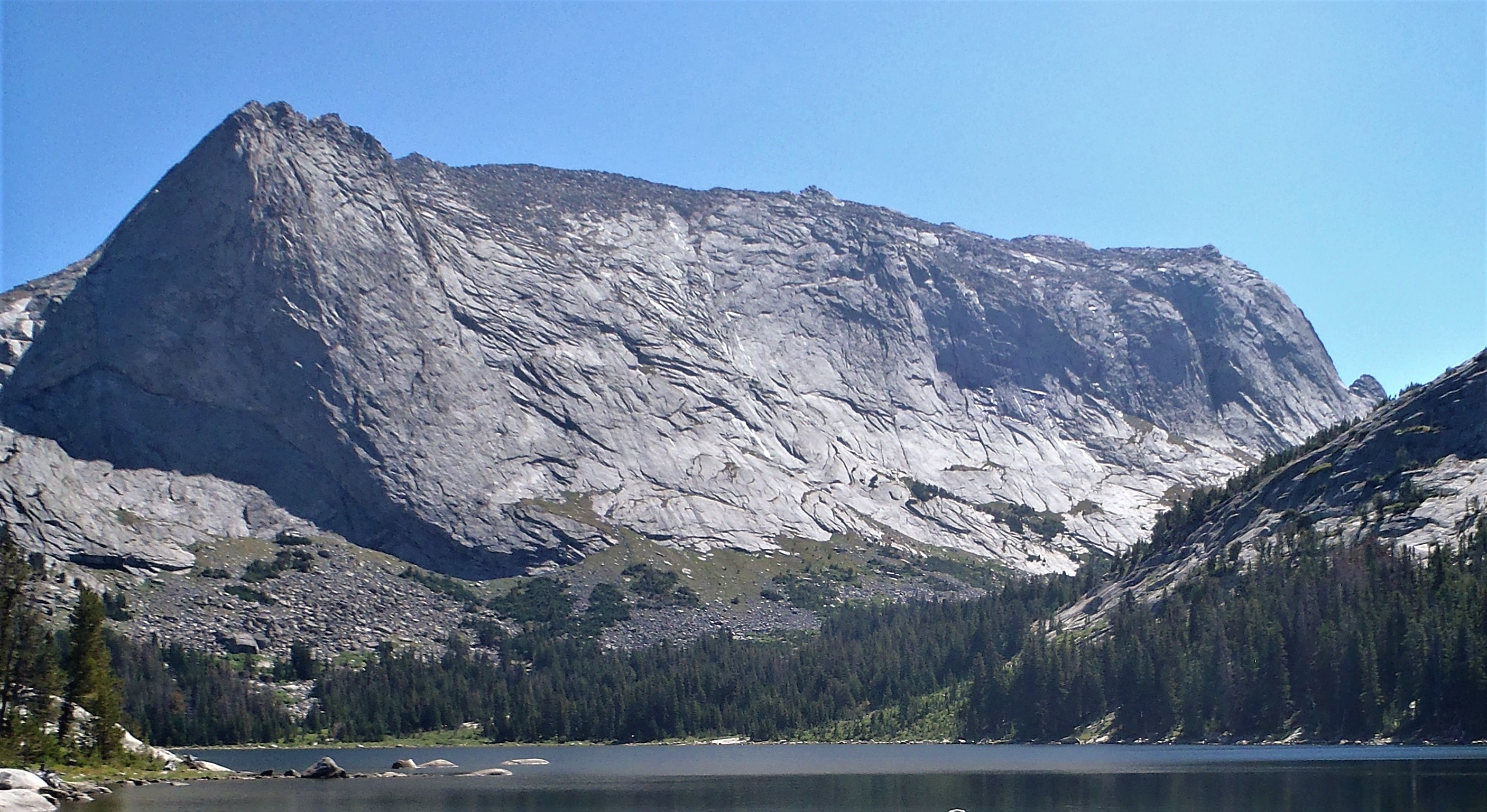
West face of Haystack Mountain

== Hazards ==
Encountering bears is a concern in the Wind River Range. There are other concerns as well, including bugs, wildfires, adverse snow conditions and nighttime cold temperatures.

Importantly, there have been notable incidents, including accidental deaths, due to falls from steep cliffs (a misstep could be fatal in this class 4/5 terrain) and due to falling rocks, over the years, including 1993, 2007 (involving an experienced NOLS leader), 2015 and 2018. A 54-year-old climber from Durango fell 400–800 feet to his death from nearby Steeple Peak in 2017. Other incidents include a seriously injured backpacker being airlifted near Squaretop Mountain in 2005, and a fatal hiker incident (from an apparent accidental fall) in 2006 that involved state search and rescue. The U.S. Forest Service does not offer updated aggregated records on the official number of fatalities in the Wind River Range.

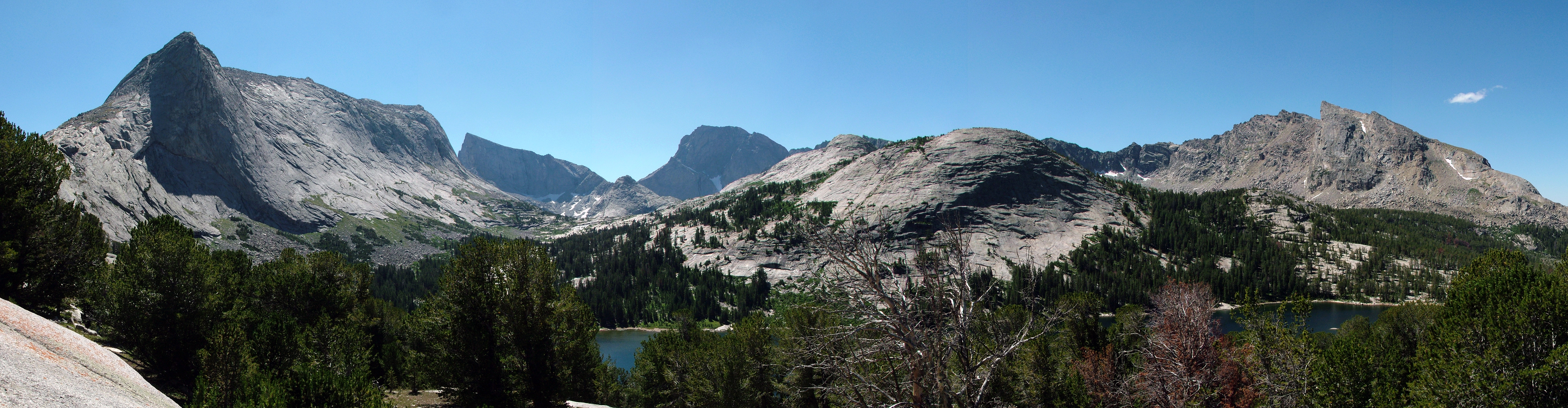
Haystack Mountain (left), Temple Peak centered in back, Schiestler Peak (right)

== See also ==
- List of mountain peaks of Wyoming
