= Schiestler Peak =

Mountain in Wyoming, United States

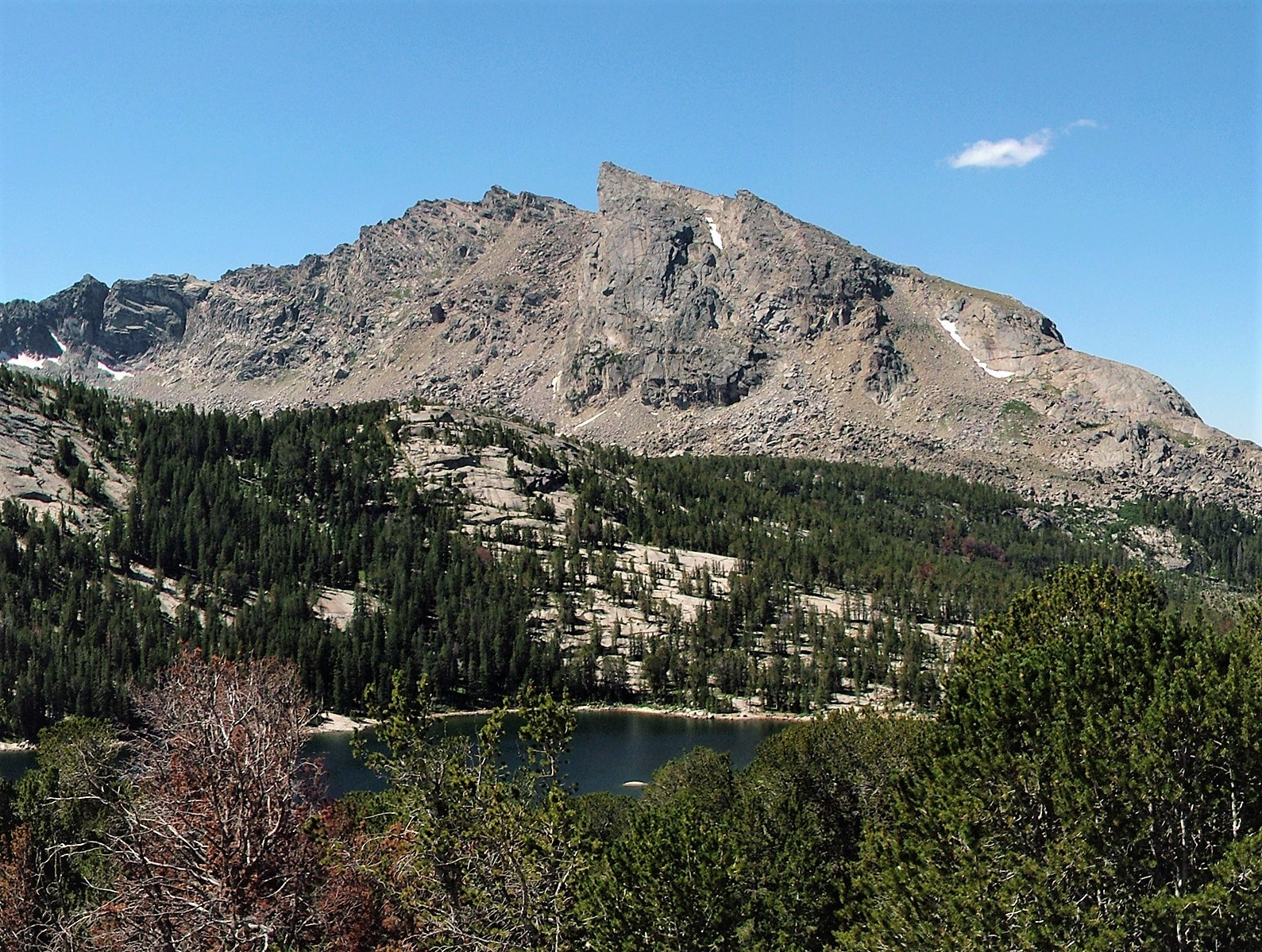
- Northeast aspect

Highest point
- Elevation: 11,624 ft (3,543 m)
- Prominence: 384 ft (117 m)
- Parent peak: A Cheval Peak (11,763 ft)
- Isolation: 1.14 mi (1.83 km)
- Coordinates: 42°43′32″N 109°12′03″W

Naming
- Etymology: Felix Schiestler

Geography
- Location within Wyoming Location within the United States
- Location: Sublette County, Wyoming, U.S.
- Parent range: Wind River Range
- Topo map: USGS Temple Peak

Geology
- Rock type: granitic

Climbing
- First ascent: August 11, 1933 by Finis Mitchell
- Easiest route: class 2 Southwest slope

Schiestler Peak is an 11,624-foot-elevation (3,543-meter) mountain summit located in Sublette County of Wyoming, United States.

== Description ==
The peak is situated in the remote Wind River Range, three miles west of the Continental Divide, and approximately four miles south of the Cirque of the Towers. It is set in the Bridger Wilderness, on land managed by Bridger-Teton National Forest. Topographic relief is significant as the northeast aspect rises 2,000 feet (610 meters) in one-half mile. Nearby geographic features include Haystack Mountain, 1.9 mile to the east, Big Sandy Lake one mile north, and Temple Peak 2.3 miles to the southeast. Access to the mountain is via the Big Sandy Trail. Molybdenum was discovered on the mountain around 1940, and several claims were staked, but little ore was extracted. Precipitation runoff from the mountain drains into headwaters of the Big Sandy River, which is a tributary of the Green River.

== Etymology ==
The peak's name honors Felix Schiestler (1855–1924), pioneer resident of Rock Springs, Wyoming. He immigrated to the United States from Austria, and after spending ten years in the east, he arrived in Rock Springs in 1886. He engaged in sheep raising, succeeding to such an extent that he was considered one of the leading flockmasters of Sweetwater County at the time of his death.

== Climate ==
According to the Köppen climate classification system, Schiestler Peak is located in an alpine subarctic climate zone with long, cold, snowy winters, and cool to warm summers. Due to its altitude, it receives precipitation all year, as snow in winter, and as thunderstorms in summer.

== Hazards ==
Encountering bears is a concern in the Wind River Range. There are other concerns as well, including bugs, wildfires, adverse snow conditions and nighttime cold temperatures.

Importantly, there have been notable incidents, including accidental deaths, due to falls from steep cliffs (a misstep could be fatal in this class 4/5 terrain) and due to falling rocks, over the years, including 1993, 2007 (involving an experienced NOLS leader), 2015 and 2018. A 54-year-old climber from Durango fell 400–800 feet to his death from nearby Steeple Peak in 2017. Other incidents include a seriously injured backpacker being airlifted near Squaretop Mountain in 2005, and a fatal hiker incident (from an apparent accidental fall) in 2006 that involved state search and rescue. The U.S. Forest Service does not offer updated aggregated records on the official number of fatalities in the Wind River Range.

== Gallery ==
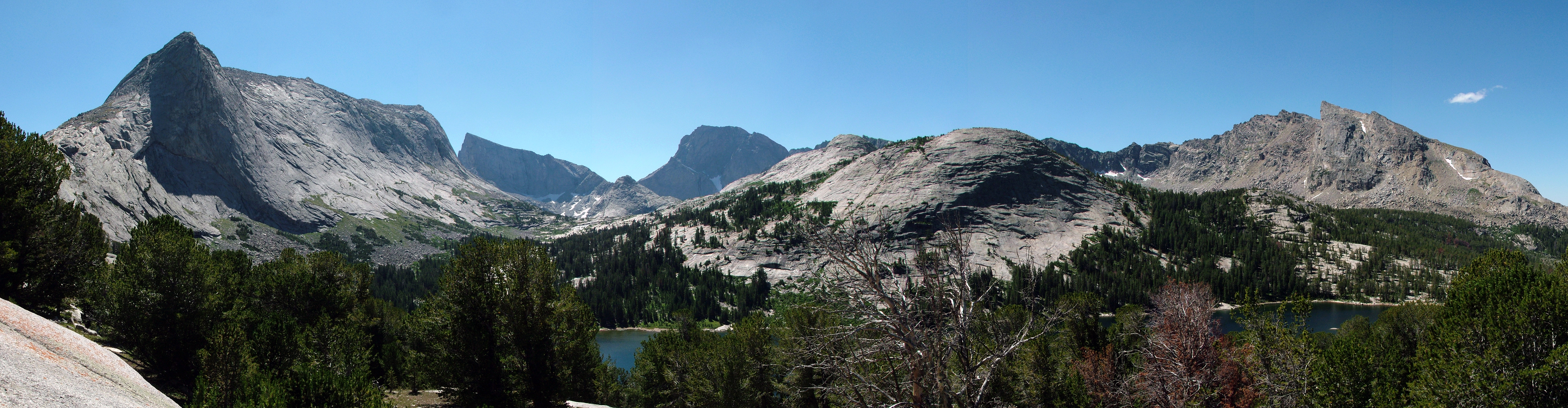
Haystack Mountain (left), Temple Peak centered in back, Schiestler Peak (right)

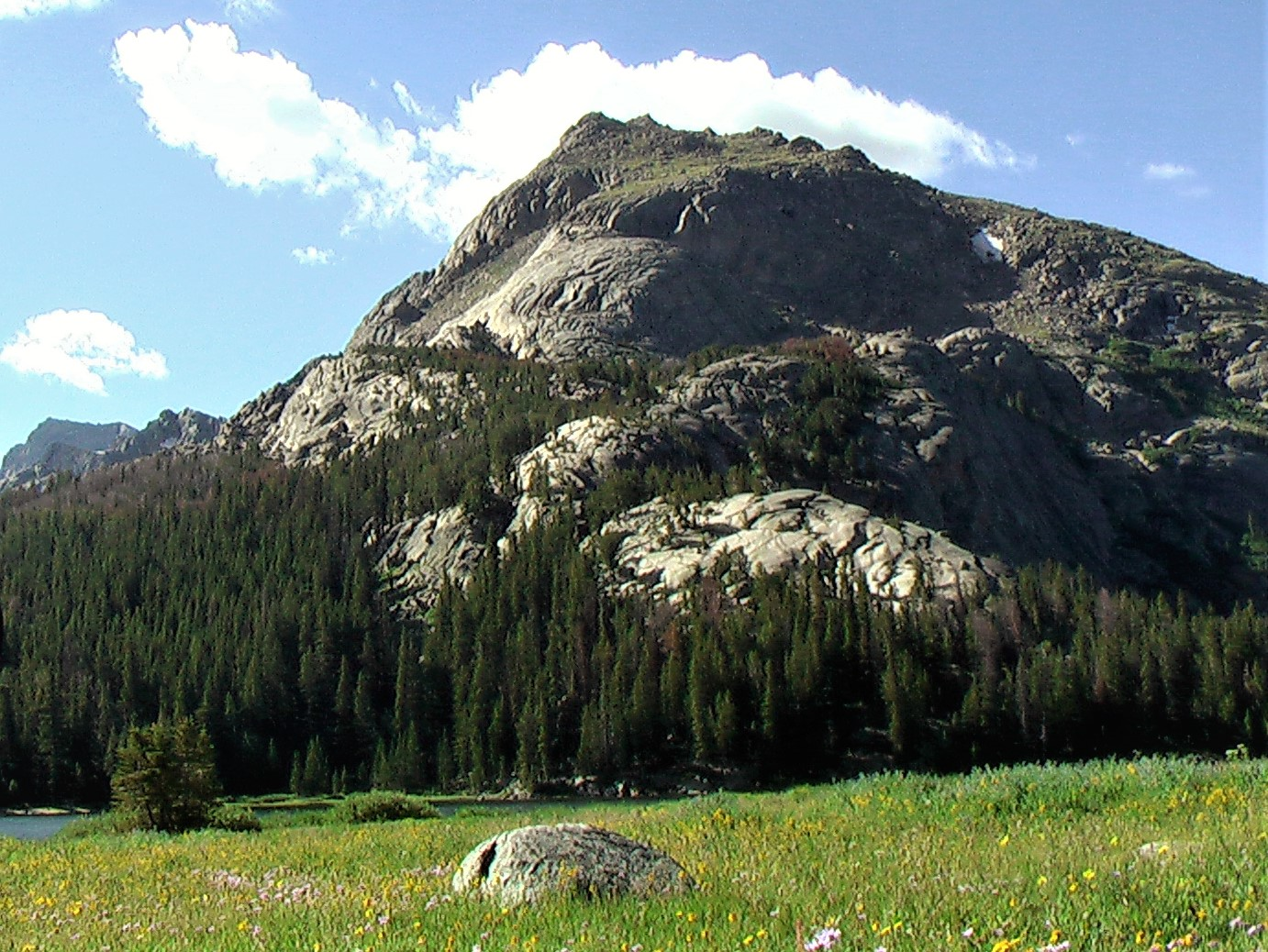
North aspect

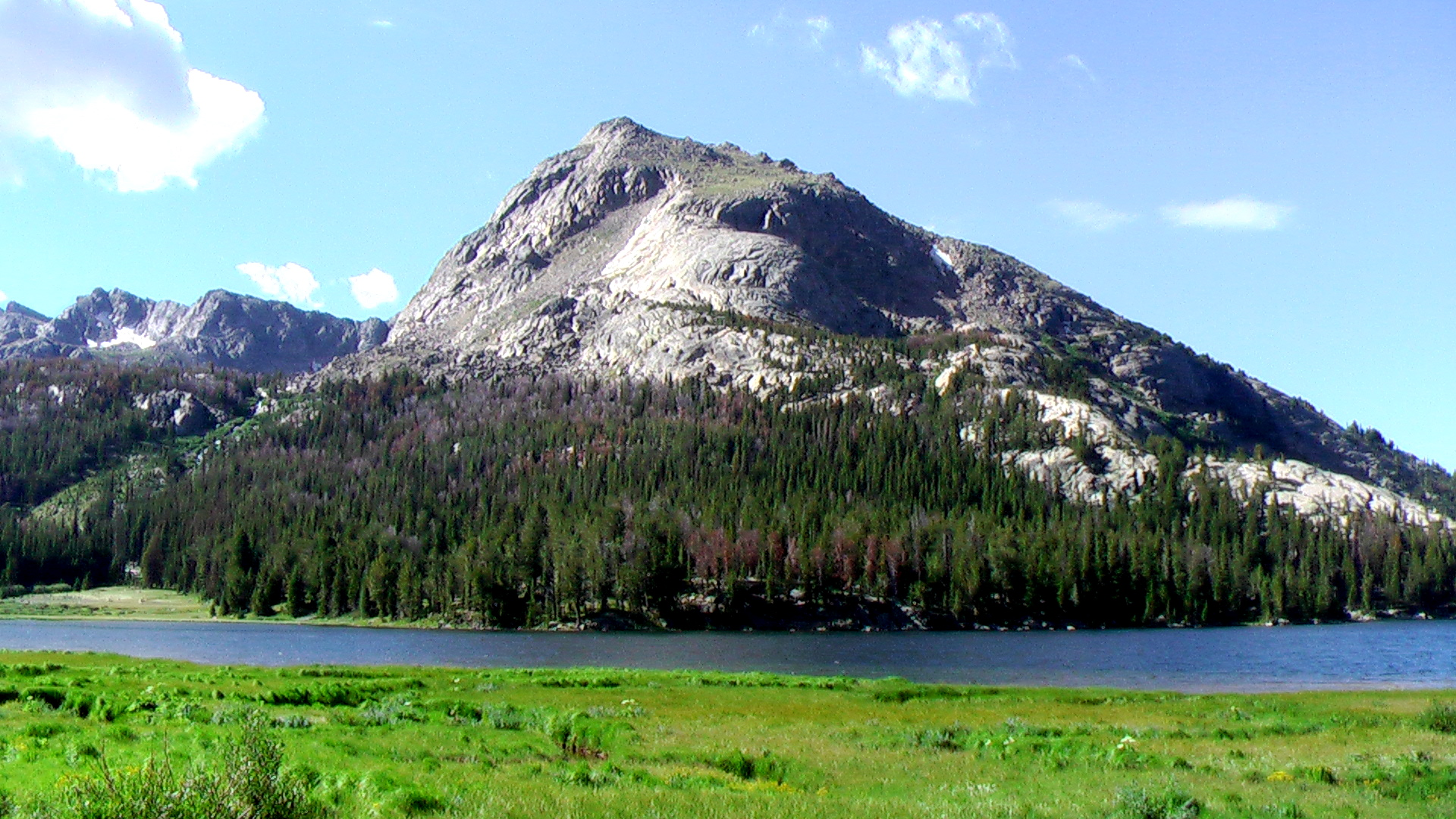
North aspect

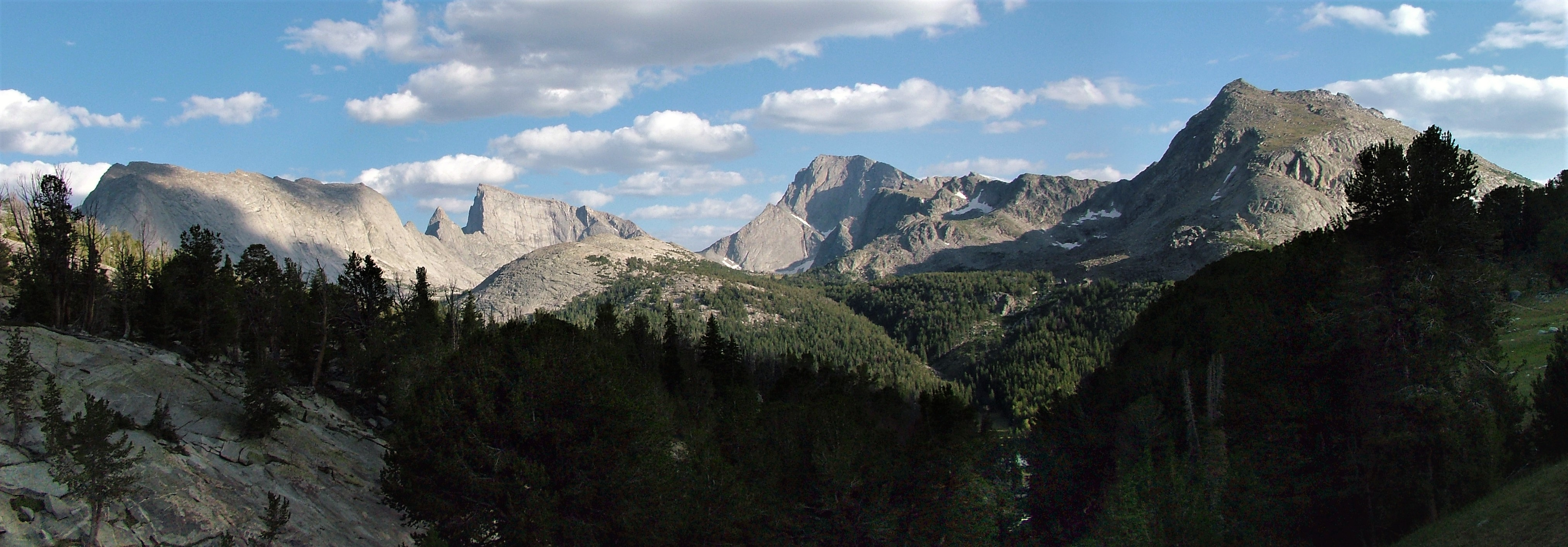
Left to rightː Haystack Mountain, East Temple Peak, Temple Peak, Schiestler Peak

== See also ==
- List of mountain peaks of Wyoming
