= Wyoming Highway 235 =

State highway in Wyoming, United States

Wyoming Highway 235
- Calpet Road
- WYO 235 highlighted in red

Route information
- Maintained by WYDOT
- Length: 4.49 mi (7.23 km)

Major junctions
- South end: US 189 in La Barge
- North end: CR 134 in Calpet

Location
- Country: United States
- State: Wyoming
- Counties: Lincoln

Highway system
- Wyoming State Highway System; Interstate; US; State
← WYO 233	→ WYO 236

Wyoming Highway 235 (WYO 235) is a 4.49-mile-long (7.23 km) Wyoming state road located in northeastern Lincoln County, Wyoming with a small, 0.6-mile-long (0.97 km) section in extreme southern Sublette County, Wyoming.

== Route description ==
Wyoming Highway 235 begins its southeastern end at U.S. Route 189 (Main Street) in La Barge. From there, Highway 235 travels northwesterly from La Barge toward the community of Calpet as it primarily serves the oil refineries in the area. WYO 235 crosses into Sublette County at approximately 3.89 miles as it reaches the community of Calpet. At 4.49 miles WYO 235 ends as Sublette CR 134 takes over heading north.

== Major intersections ==
County	Location	mi	km	Destinations	Notes
Lincoln	La Barge	0.00	0.00	US 189	Southern Terminus of WYO 235
Sublette	Calpet	4.49	7.23	CR 134	Northern Terminus of WYO 235
1.000 mi = 1.609 km; 1.000 km = 0.621 mi
