= Steeple Peak =

Mountain in Wyoming, United States

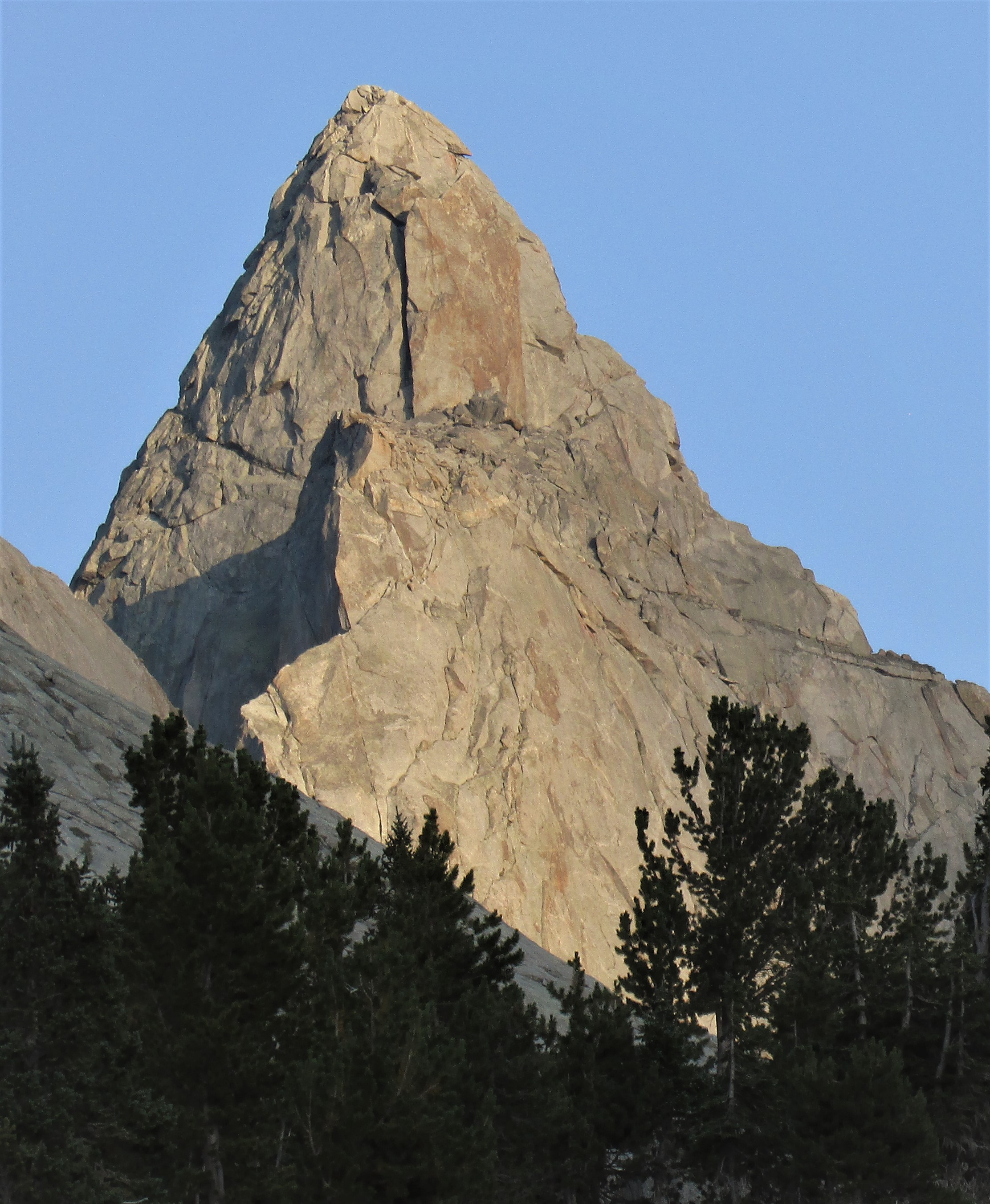
- Northwest aspect

Highest point
- Elevation: 12,040 ft (3,670 m)
- Prominence: 400 ft (120 m)
- Parent peak: East Temple Peak (12,605 ft)
- Isolation: 0.37 mi (0.60 km)
- Coordinates: 42°42′53″N 109°09′33″W

Geography
- Location within Wyoming Location within the United States
- Location: Sublette County, Wyoming, U.S.
- Parent range: Wind River Range
- Topo map: USGS Temple Peak

Geology
- Rock type: granite

Climbing
- First ascent: August 22, 1961 Chouinard
- Easiest route: class 5.8 South ridge

Steeple Peak is a 12,040-foot-elevation (3,670-meter) summit located in Sublette County of Wyoming, United States.

== Geography ==
The peak is situated 1.5 mile west of the Continental Divide in the remote Wind River Range. It is set in the Bridger Wilderness, on land managed by Bridger-Teton National Forest. It is on the ridge between Haystack Mountain 1.2 mile to the north, and parent East Temple Peak 0.37 mile to the south. Other neighbors include Schiestler Peak, 2.2 mile to the northwest, and Temple Peak 1.25 mile southwest. Topographic relief is significant as the northwest aspect rises 1,500 feet (460 meters) above Deep Lake in one-half mile. Access is via a half-day hike on the Big Sandy Trail. Precipitation runoff from the mountain drains into tributaries of the Big Sandy River, which in turn is a tributary of the Green River.

== Climate ==
According to the Köppen climate classification system, Steeple Peak is located in an alpine subarctic climate zone with long, cold, snowy winters, and cool to warm summers. Due to its altitude, it receives precipitation all year, as snow in winter, and as thunderstorms in summer.

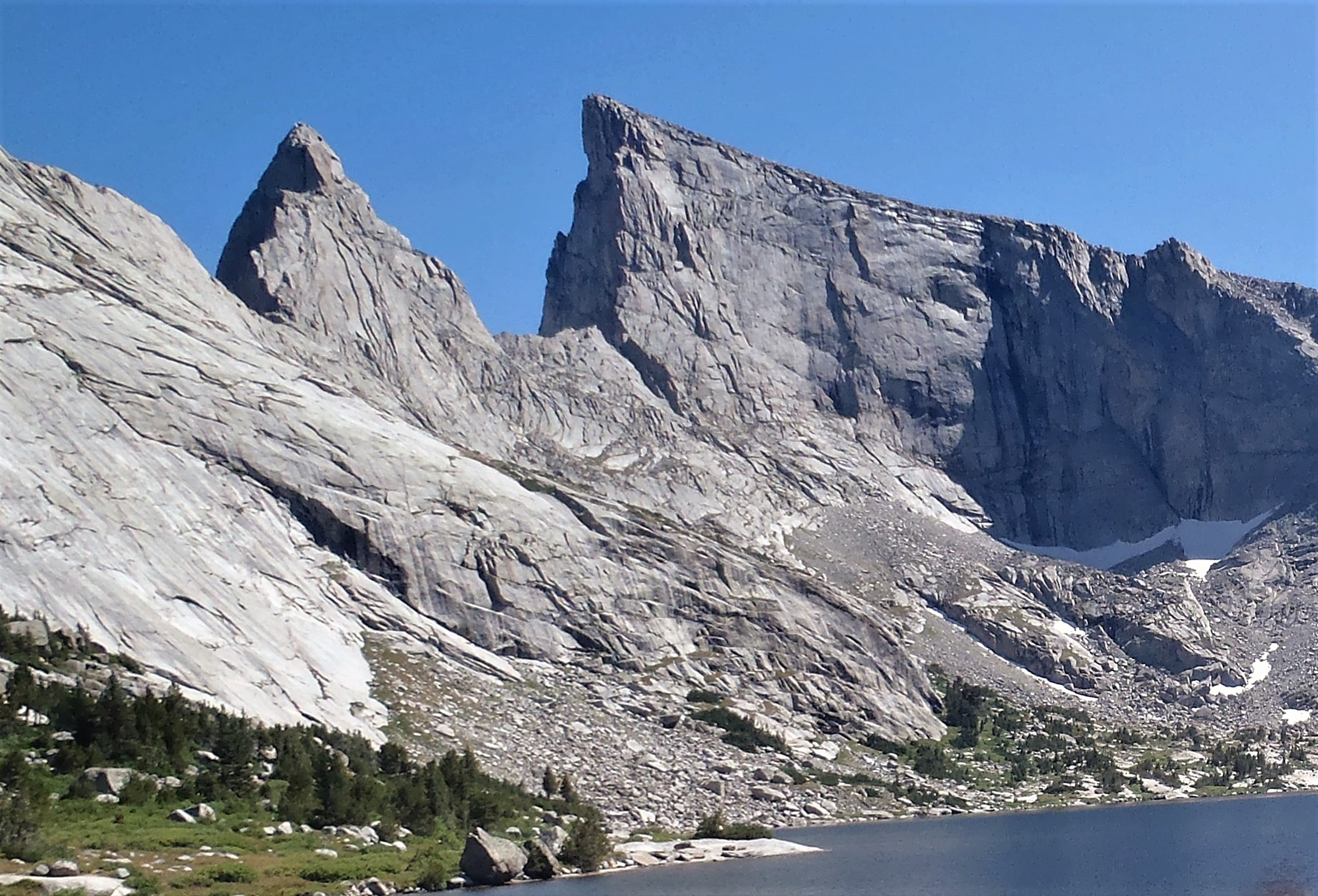
Steeple Peak (left), East Temple Peak (center)

== Climbing ==
Established climbing routes:

- South Ridge – class 5.8 – 1961 – Yvon Chouinard, Art Gran, John Hudson
- North Ridge and Upper West Face – 1964 – Richard Ream, Gerry Holdsworth
- East Ridge – 1979 – Alan Bartlett, David Black, Rick Bradshaw
- West face Major dihedral – class 5.11 – 1995 – Tim Wolfe, Chris Abbott, Susan Wolfe
- North Ridge (aka Great North Chimney) – (III 5.8)

== Hazards ==
Encountering bears is a concern in the Wind River Range. There are other concerns as well, including bugs, wildfires, adverse snow conditions and nighttime cold temperatures.

Importantly, there have been notable incidents, including accidental deaths, due to falls from steep cliffs (a misstep could be fatal in this class 4/5 terrain) and due to falling rocks, over the years, including 1993, 2007 (involving an experienced NOLS leader), 2015 and 2018. A 54-year-old climber from Durango fell 400–800 feet to his death from Steeple Peak in 2017. Other incidents include a seriously injured backpacker being airlifted near Squaretop Mountain in 2005, and a fatal hiker incident (from an apparent accidental fall) in 2006 that involved state search and rescue. The U.S. Forest Service does not offer updated aggregated records on the official number of fatalities in the Wind River Range.

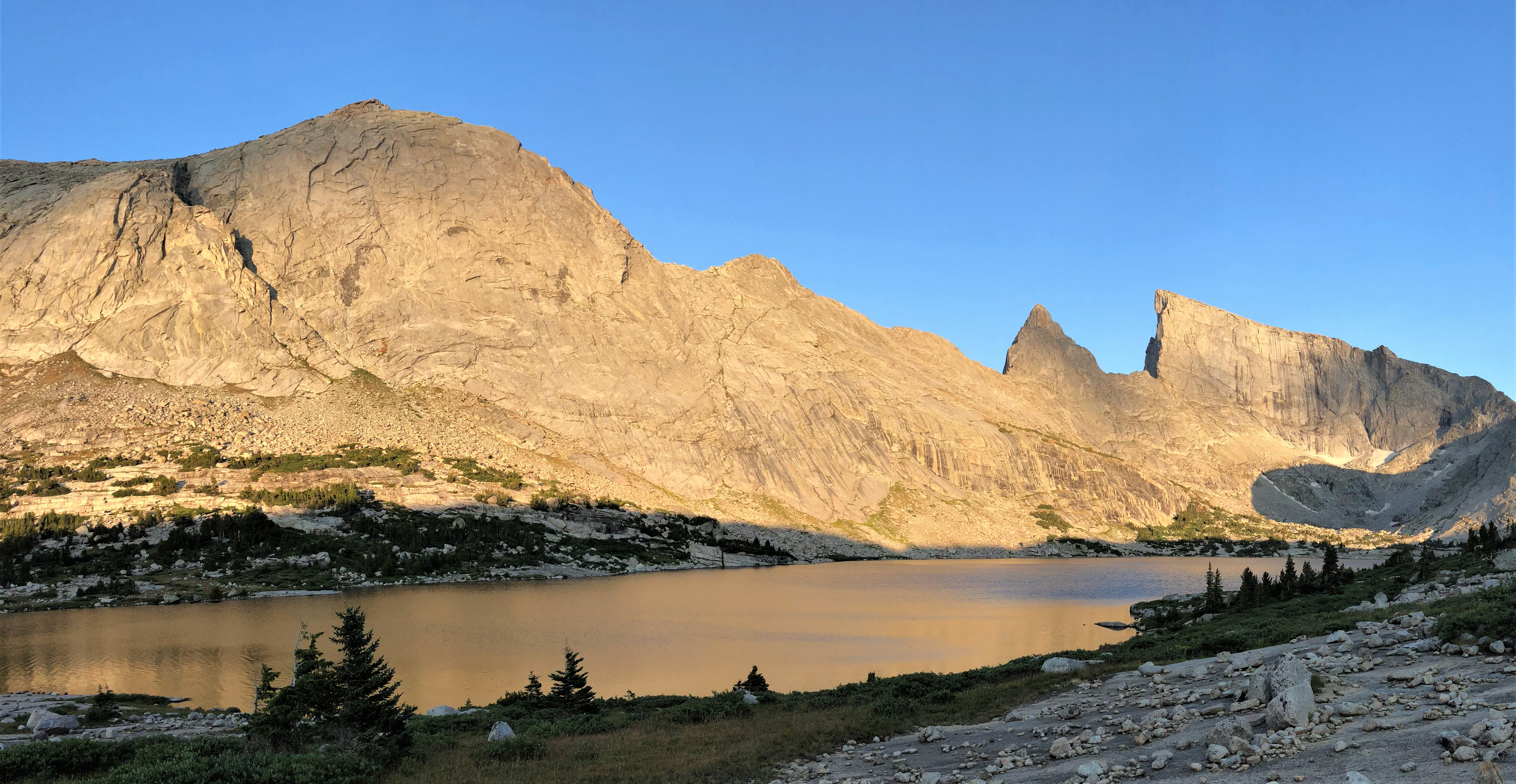
Haystack Mountain (left), Steeple Peak, and East Temple Peak rise above Deep Lake

== See also ==
- List of mountain peaks of Wyoming
