= Miley Memorial Field =

Coordinates: 42°35′06″N 110°06′40″W

- IATA: BPI; ICAO: KBPI; FAA LID: BPI

Summary
- Airport type: Public
- Owner: Big Piney-Marbleton Airport Board
- Serves: Big Piney / Marbleton, Wyoming
- Elevation AMSL: 6,994 ft / 2,132 m
- Interactive map of Miley Memorial Field

Runways
Direction	Length		Surface
Direction	ft	m	Surface
13/31	6,803	2,074	Asphalt
8/26	3,301	1,006	Turf

Statistics (2022)
- Aircraft operations (year ending 6/30/2022): 3,554
- Source: Federal Aviation Administration

Miley Memorial Field (IATA: BPI, ICAO: KBPI, FAA LID: BPI), formerly known as Big Piney-Marbleton Airport, is a public airport located three miles (5 km) north of Big Piney and two miles (3 km) north of Marbleton, both towns in Sublette County, Wyoming, United States. It is owned by the Big Piney-Marbleton Airport Board.

== Facilities and aircraft ==
Miley Memorial Field covers an area of 1,199 acres (485 ha) which contains two runways: 13/31 has a 6,803 x 75 ft (2,074 x 23 m) asphalt surface, while 8/26 has a 3,301 x 60 ft (1,006 x 18 m) turf surface.

For the 12-month period ending June 30, 2022, the airport had 3,544 aircraft operations, an average of 68 per week: 99% general aviation, 1% air taxi and <1% military. At that time, there were 13 single-engine aircraft and 1 helicopter based at the airport.

== See also ==
- List of airports in Wyoming
