= Warbonnet Peak =

Warbonnet Peak can refer to two mountains in the United States:

- Warbonnet Peak (Idaho), in Boise County
- Warbonnet Peak (Wyoming), in Converse County

== See also ==
- War Bonnet Peak, Wyoming
