= Wardell Buffalo Trap =

- U.S. National Register of Historic Places
- Nearest city: Big Piney, Wyoming
- NRHP reference No.: 71000892
- Added to NRHP: August 12, 1971

The Wardell Buffalo Trap in Sublette County, Wyoming, is a small box canyon used by Native Americans for 500 years during the Late Prehistoric Period. Nearly 55 feet (17 m) of bison bones were found at the site. A campsite and butchering area is located nearby, and evidence has been found for a fence at the entrance to the canyon.

Bison were herded into the canyon's confined space and killed, the earliest known example of such a place where bison were killed with bow and arrow. The site was first excavated in 1970-71 by Wyoming State Archeologist George Carr Frison, producing about three tons of bison bones mixed with projectile points and fragments of pottery. More excavation was undertaken in 2005 after evidence emerged of artifact poaching. The 2005 expedition produced an estimated ton of bison bones from an area measuring 18 square metres (190 ft^{2}) by 2 metres (6.6 ft) in depth. Studies suggest that the hunters were Athabascans from Canada. Following excavation the site was stabilized and placed under surveillance.
