= Marbleton =

Marbleton may refer to:

- Marbleton, Dudswell, Quebec, Canada - a former village
- Marbleton, Wyoming, United States

It may also be a misspelling of Marbletown:

- Marbletown, New York, United States
