= Sublette County School District Number 1 =

School district in Wyoming, United States

Sublette County School District #1 is a public school district based in Pinedale, Wyoming, United States.

== Geography ==
Sublette County School District #1 serves most of Sublette County, with the only exception being the southwestern portion of the county (which is part of Sublette County School District #9). The following communities are served by the district:

- Incorporated places
  - Town of Pinedale
- Census-designated places (Note: All census-designated places are unincorporated.)
  - Bondurant
  - Boulder
  - Cora
  - Daniel

== Schools ==
- Pinedale High School (Grades 9–12)
- Pinedale Middle School (Grades 6–8)
- Bondurant Elementary School (Grades K-4)
- Pinedale Elementary School (Grades K-5)

== Student demographics ==
The following figures are as of October 1, 2008.

- Total District Enrollment: 989
- Student enrollment by gender
  - Male: 505 (51.06%)
  - Female: 484 (48.94%)
- Student enrollment by ethnicity
  - White (not Hispanic): 902 (91.20%)
  - Hispanic: 68 (6.88%)
  - American Indian or Alaskan Native: 13 (1.31%)
  - Asian or Pacific Islander: 4 (0.40%)
  - Black (not Hispanic): 2 (0.20%)

== See also ==
- List of school districts in Wyoming
