= Mitchell Peak (Wyoming) =

American mountain

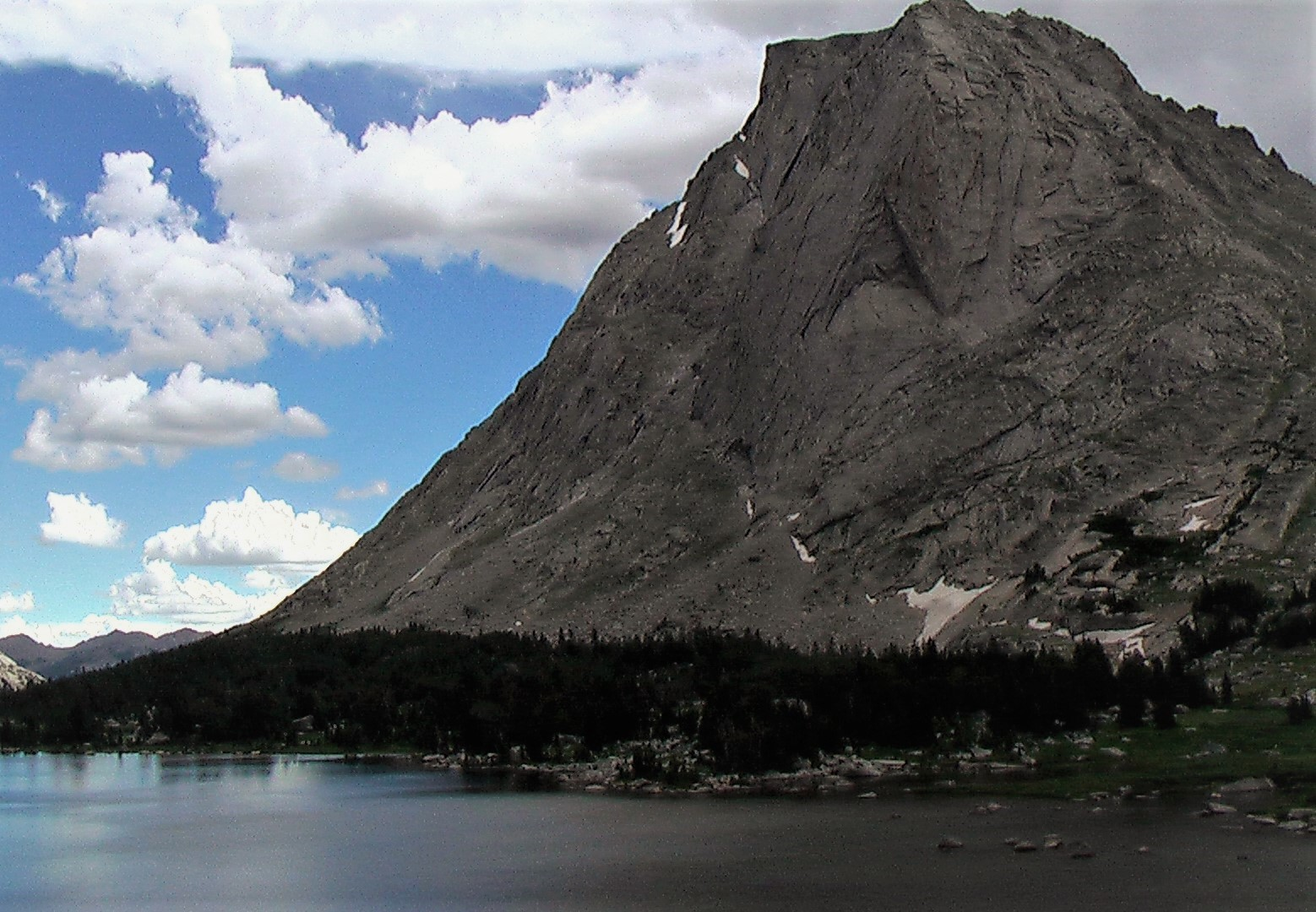
- Northwest aspect, from Lonesome Lake

Highest point
- Elevation: 12,487 ft (3,806 m)
- Coordinates: 42°46′06″N 109°11′54″W

Geography
- Location within Wyoming Location within the United States
- Location: Fremont and Sublette Counties, Wyoming, U.S.
- Parent range: Wind River Range
- Topo map: USGS Lizard Head Peak

Mitchell Peak (12,487 feet (3,806 m)) is located in the southern Wind River Range in the U.S. state of Wyoming. Mitchell Peak is on the southern side of the Cirque of the Towers, a popular climbing area. Mitchell Peak sits along the Continental Divide, less than 1 mi (1.6 km) northwest of Dog Tooth Peak. The peak was named after Finis Mitchell a respected forester and mountain climber of the Wind River Range. In recognition of his many accomplishments, the U.S. Congress named the peak after Mitchell while he was still living.

== Hazards ==
Encountering bears is a concern in the Wind River Range. There are other concerns as well, including bugs, wildfires, adverse snow conditions and nighttime cold temperatures.

Importantly, there have been notable incidents, including accidental deaths, due to falls from steep cliffs (a misstep could be fatal in this class 4/5 terrain) and due to falling rocks, over the years, including 1993, 2007 (involving an experienced NOLS leader), 2015 and 2018. Other incidents include a seriously injured backpacker being airlifted near SquareTop Mountain in 2005, and a fatal hiker incident (from an apparent accidental fall) in 2006 that involved state search and rescue. The U.S. Forest Service does not offer updated aggregated records on the official number of fatalities in the Wind River Range.

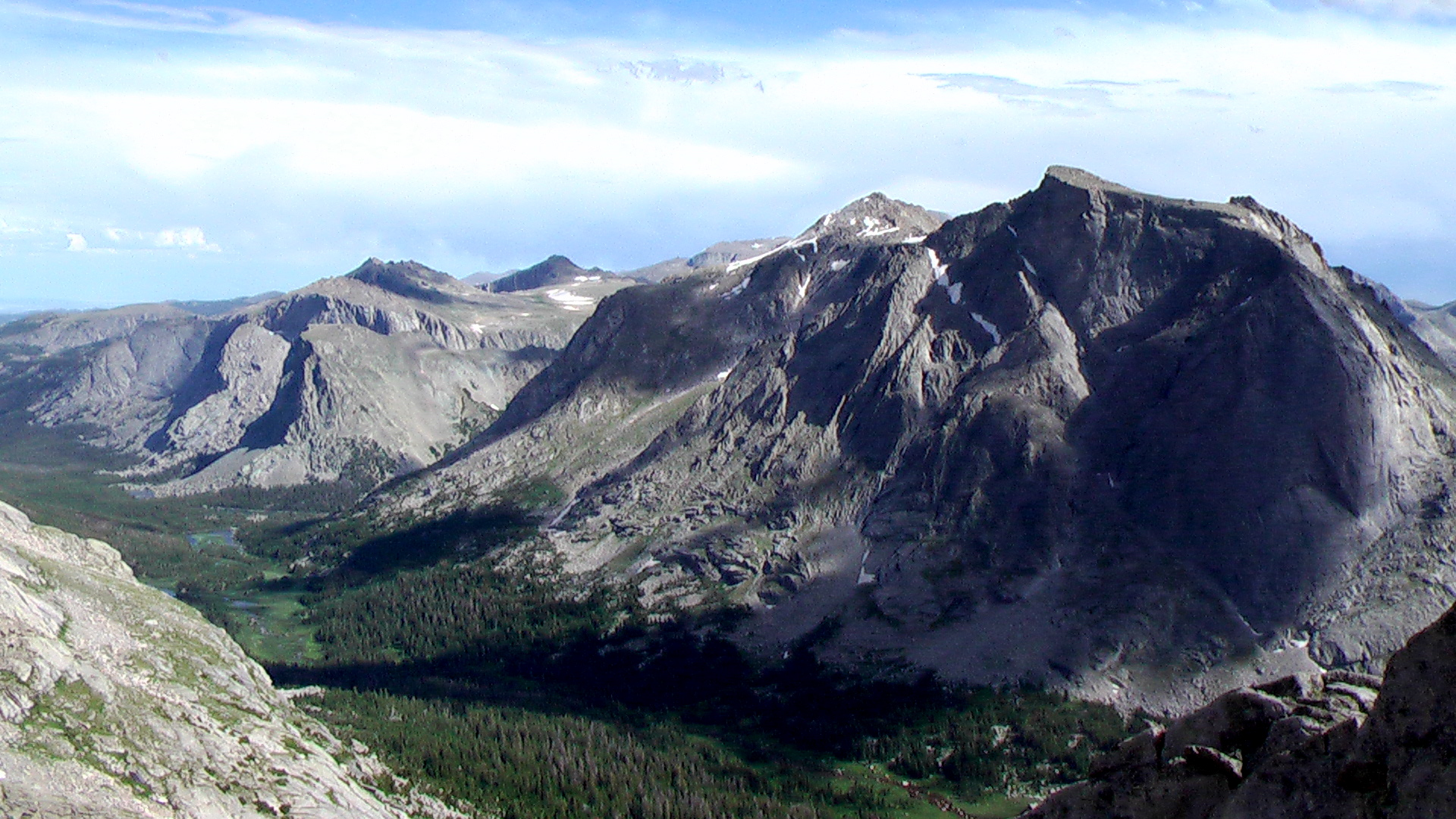
Mitchell Peak (right), northwest aspect
