= East Temple Peak =

Mountain in the state of Wyoming

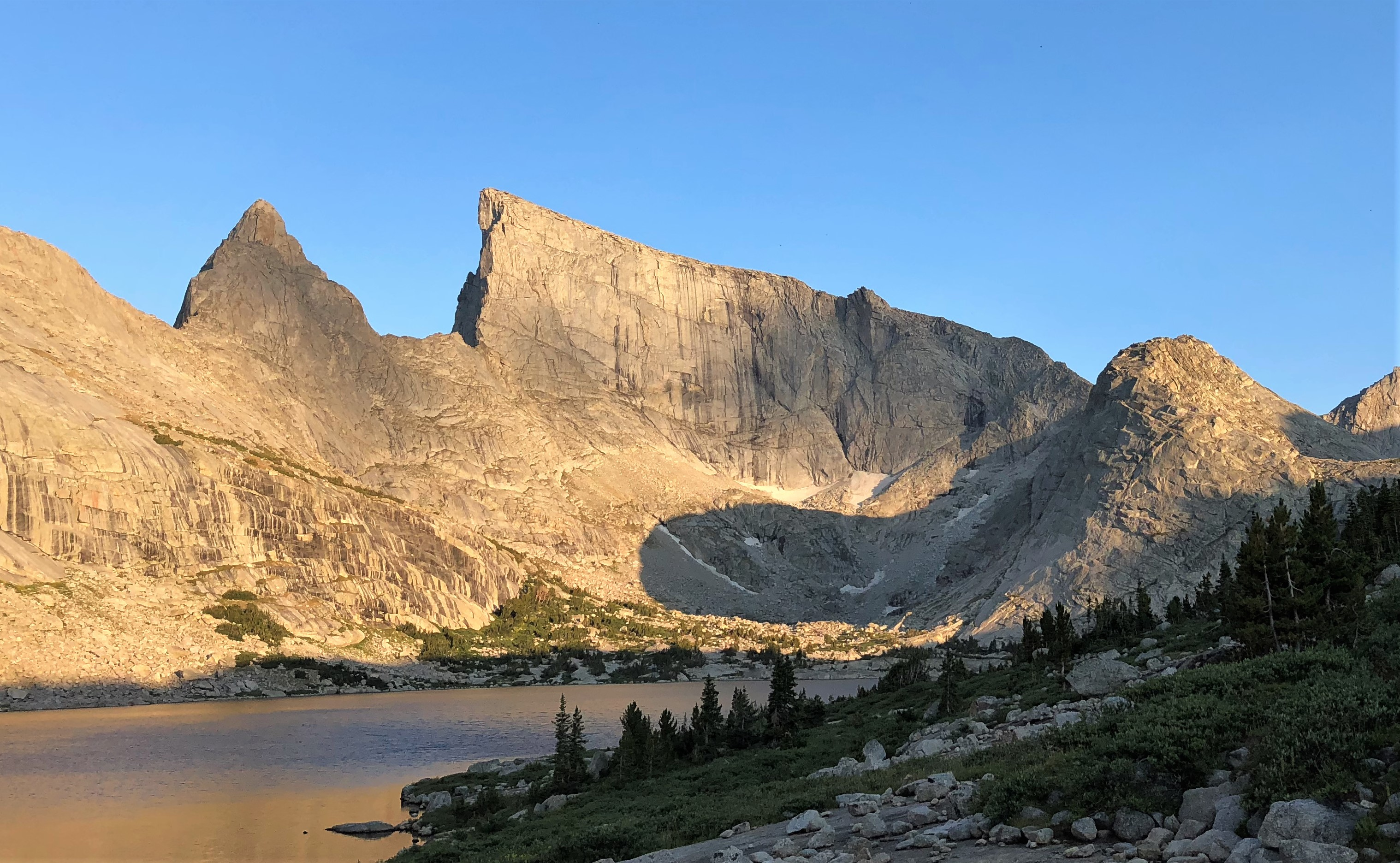
- Northwest aspect, from Deep Lake (Steeple Peak to left)

Highest point
- Elevation: 12,605 ft (3,842 m)
- Prominence: 920 ft (280 m)
- Coordinates: 42°42′38″N 109°09′23″W

Geography
- Location within Wyoming Location within the United States
- Location: Sublette County, Wyoming, U.S.
- Parent range: Wind River Range
- Topo map: USGS Temple Peak

East Temple Peak (exact height range is somewhere between 12,605 to 12,645 feet (3,842 to 3,854 m)) is located in the southern Wind River Range in the U.S. state of Wyoming. East Temple Peak is a little over 1 mile (1.6 km) northeast of Temple Peak and 1.5 mi (2.4 km) west of Wind River Peak. A small glacier clings to the northeast slopes of East Temple Peak. East Temple Peak is in the Bridger Wilderness of Bridger-Teton National Forest.

== Hazards ==
Encountering bears is a concern in the Wind River Range. There are other concerns as well, including bugs, wildfires, adverse snow conditions and nighttime cold temperatures.

Importantly, there have been notable incidents, including accidental deaths, due to falls from steep cliffs (a misstep could be fatal in this class 4/5 terrain) and due to falling rocks, over the years, including 1993, 2007 (involving an experienced NOLS leader), 2015 and 2018. Other incidents include a seriously injured backpacker being airlifted near SquareTop Mountain in 2005, and a fatal hiker incident (from an apparent accidental fall) in 2006 that involved state search and rescue. The U.S. Forest Service does not offer updated aggregated records on the official number of fatalities in the Wind River Range.

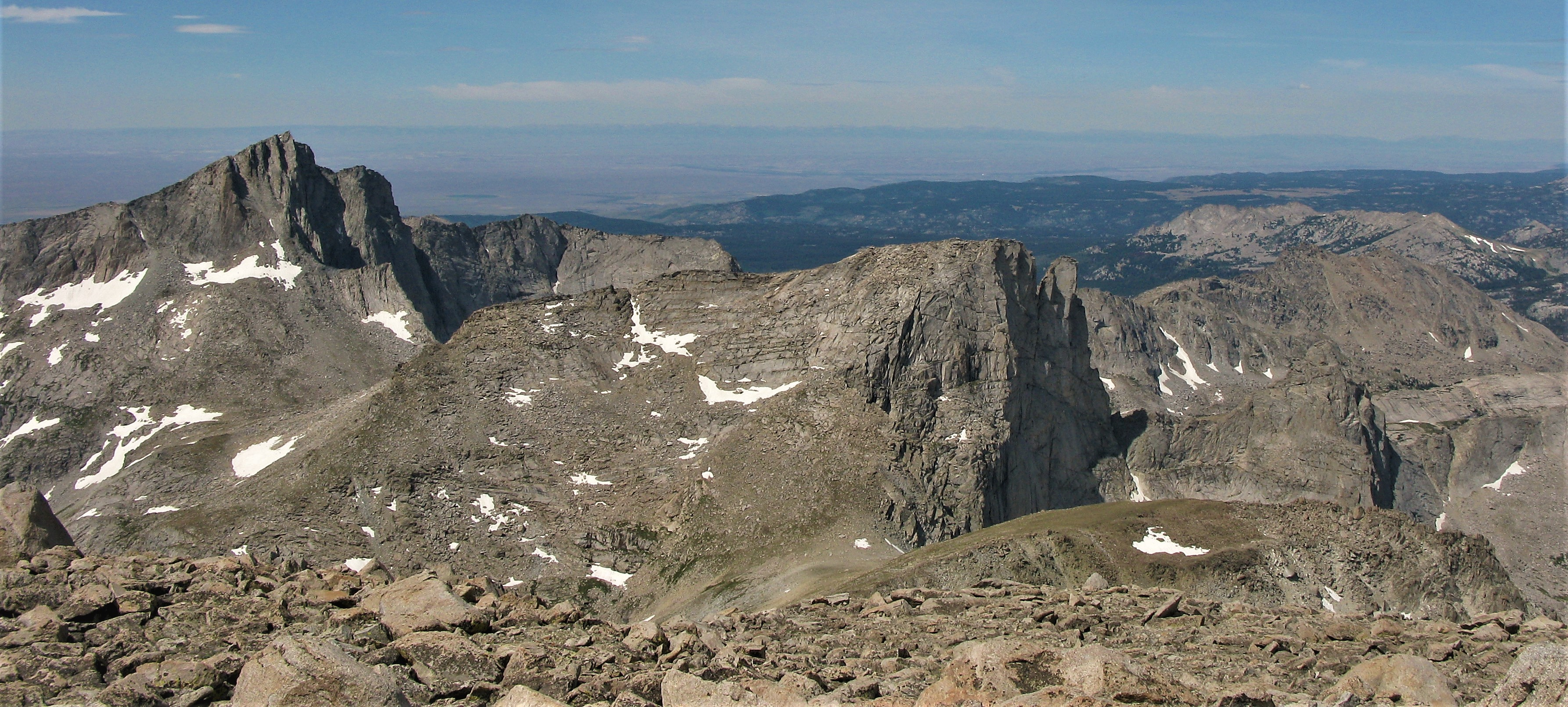
Temple Peak (left) and East Temple Peak (center) seen from the east on Wind River Peak
