= Big Sandy Mountain =

Mountain in Wyoming, United States

- Location within Wyoming Location within the United States

Highest point
- Elevation: 12,416 ft (3,784 m)
- Coordinates: 42°45′04″N 109°10′45″W

Geography
- Location: Fremont and Sublette Counties, Wyoming, U.S.
- Parent range: Wind River Range
- Topo map: USGS Lizard Head Peak

Big Sandy Mountain (12,416 feet (3,784 m)) is located in the southern Wind River Range in the U.S. state of Wyoming. Big Sandy Mountain sits along the Continental Divide, less than 1 mi (1.6 km) southeast of Dog Tooth Peak.

== Hazards ==
Encountering bears is a concern in the Wind River Range. There are other concerns as well, including bugs, wildfires, adverse snow conditions and nighttime cold temperatures.

Importantly, there have been notable incidents, including accidental deaths, due to falls from steep cliffs (a misstep could be fatal in this class 4/5 terrain) and due to falling rocks, over the years, including 1993, 2007 (involving an experienced NOLS leader), 2015 and 2018. Other incidents include a seriously injured backpacker being airlifted near SquareTop Mountain in 2005, and a fatal hiker incident (from an apparent accidental fall) in 2006 that involved state search and rescue. The U.S. Forest Service does not offer updated aggregated records on the official number of fatalities in the Wind River Range.

== Climate ==
There is no weather station at the summit, but this climate table contains interpolated data for an area around the summit. Big Sandy Mountain has a tundra climate (Köppen ET).

Climate data for Big Sandy Mountain 42.7528 N, 109.1775 W, Elevation: 11,972 ft (3,649 m) (1991–2020 normals)
Month	Jan	Feb	Mar	Apr	May	Jun	Jul	Aug	Sep	Oct	Nov	Dec	Year
Mean daily maximum °F (°C)	21.5 (−5.8)	21.2 (−6.0)	27.0 (−2.8)	31.8 (−0.1)	40.8 (4.9)	51.4 (10.8)	60.9 (16.1)	59.5 (15.3)	50.6 (10.3)	37.9 (3.3)	27.0 (−2.8)	20.5 (−6.4)	37.5 (3.1)
Daily mean °F (°C)	11.5 (−11.4)	10.3 (−12.1)	15.4 (−9.2)	20.0 (−6.7)	28.8 (−1.8)	38.6 (3.7)	47.3 (8.5)	46.3 (7.9)	38.2 (3.4)	27.0 (−2.8)	17.2 (−8.2)	10.9 (−11.7)	26.0 (−3.4)
Mean daily minimum °F (°C)	1.4 (−17.0)	−0.5 (−18.1)	3.8 (−15.7)	8.2 (−13.2)	16.9 (−8.4)	25.9 (−3.4)	33.8 (1.0)	33.1 (0.6)	25.8 (−3.4)	16.0 (−8.9)	7.4 (−13.7)	1.3 (−17.1)	14.4 (−9.8)
Average precipitation inches (mm)	2.73 (69)	2.41 (61)	2.83 (72)	4.23 (107)	4.28 (109)	2.98 (76)	1.71 (43)	1.75 (44)	2.30 (58)	2.84 (72)	2.15 (55)	2.98 (76)	33.19 (842)
Source: PRISM Climate Group

Big Sandy Opening is a popular trailhead that provides access to Big Sandy Lake and Mountain, as well as other locations within the southern area of the Wind River Range. Big Sandy Opening has a subarctic climate (Köppen Dfc).

Climate data for Big Sandy Opening, Wyoming, 1991–2020 normals: 9080ft (2768m)
Month	Jan	Feb	Mar	Apr	May	Jun	Jul	Aug	Sep	Oct	Nov	Dec	Year
Mean daily maximum °F (°C)	27.9 (−2.3)	30.0 (−1.1)	38.4 (3.6)	45.2 (7.3)	53.5 (11.9)	62.9 (17.2)	71.9 (22.2)	70.5 (21.4)	59.9 (15.5)	46.0 (7.8)	33.6 (0.9)	26.4 (−3.1)	47.2 (8.4)
Daily mean °F (°C)	14.4 (−9.8)	15.5 (−9.2)	23.2 (−4.9)	30.9 (−0.6)	40.0 (4.4)	48.3 (9.1)	55.8 (13.2)	54.5 (12.5)	45.8 (7.7)	34.1 (1.2)	21.0 (−6.1)	13.6 (−10.2)	33.1 (0.6)
Mean daily minimum °F (°C)	0.9 (−17.3)	0.8 (−17.3)	7.9 (−13.4)	16.6 (−8.6)	26.5 (−3.1)	33.7 (0.9)	39.6 (4.2)	38.3 (3.5)	31.6 (−0.2)	22.1 (−5.5)	8.5 (−13.1)	0.8 (−17.3)	18.9 (−7.3)
Average precipitation inches (mm)	2.13 (54)	2.20 (56)	2.10 (53)	2.39 (61)	2.57 (65)	1.87 (47)	1.04 (26)	1.23 (31)	1.78 (45)	1.91 (49)	1.82 (46)	2.32 (59)	23.36 (592)
Source 1: XMACIS2
Source 2: NOAA (Precipitation)
