= Cora, Wyoming =

- Census-designated place
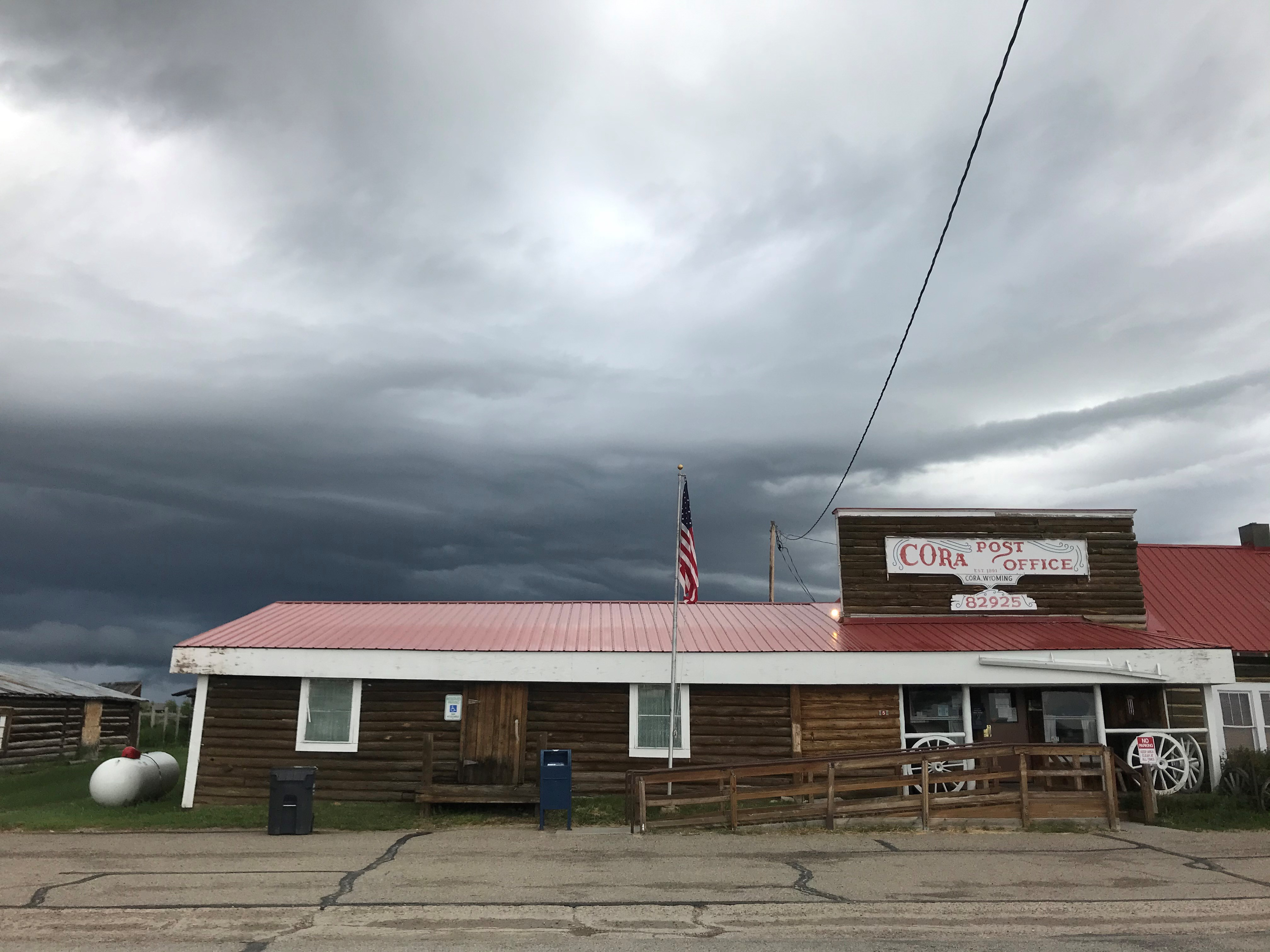
- The Cora Post Office, along Wyoming Highway 352, June 2020

- Location in the United States
- Coordinates: 42°57′48″N 110°00′03″W
- Country: United States
- State: Wyoming
- County: Sublette

Area
  - Total: 5.0 sq mi (13 km^{2})
  - Land: 5.0 sq mi (13 km^{2})
  - Water: 0.0 sq mi (0 km^{2})
- Elevation: 7,352 ft (2,241 m)

Population (2010)
  - Total: 142
  - Density: 28/sq mi (11/km^{2})
- Time zone: UTC-7 (Mountain (MST))
  - Summer (DST): UTC-6 (MDT)
- ZIP code: 82925
- Area code: 307
- FIPS code: 56-17210
- GNIS feature ID: 2407659
- Cora Townsite
- U.S. National Register of Historic Places
- NRHP reference No.: 100000925
- Added to NRHP: April 24, 2017

Cora is a census-designated place (CDP) in Sublette County, Wyoming. The population was 114 at the 2020 census.

== History ==
Cora may have been named after Cora House, a cowgirl who lived in the area. In the early 20th century, the town post office was moved to its current site from a ranch one mile to the east. Dogsleds were once used to make winter deliveries to residents who lived in the Cora area and the rest of the Upper Green River valley.

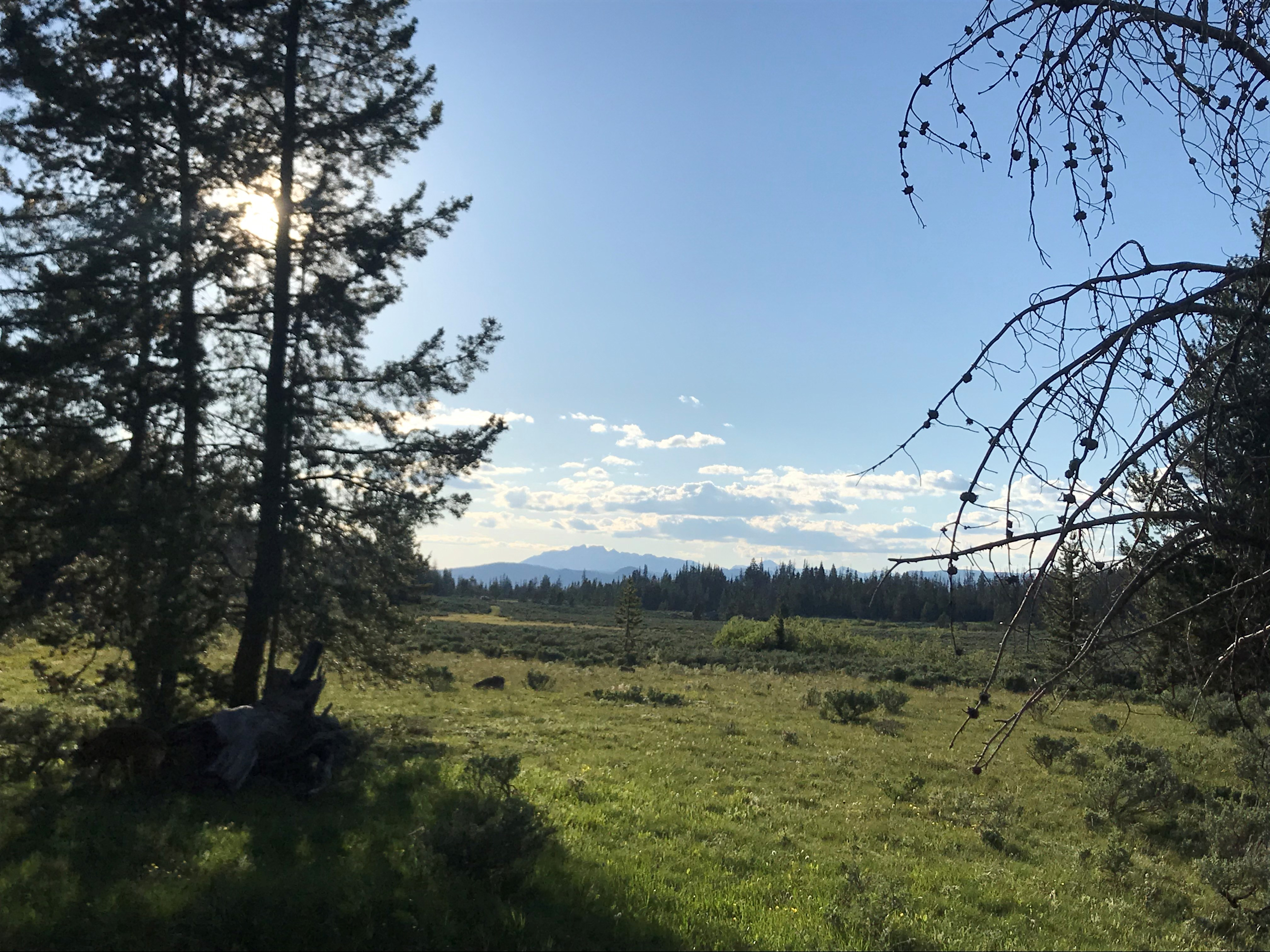
A view of the Gros Ventre Range from Boulder Basin in Cora

In 2011, the U.S. Postal Service considered closing the Cora post office for budgetary reasons. Residents of Cora protested and wrote letters to the USPS requesting that the post office remain open because it serves as a gathering place for the community. As of 2022, the post office is still open.

John Perry Barlow, lyricist for the Grateful Dead, grew up in Cora on his family's homestead, the Bar Cross Ranch.

== Demographics ==
As of the census of 2000, there were 76 people, 38 households, and 25 families residing in the CDP. The population density was 14.1 people per square mile (5.4/km^{2}). There were 60 housing units at an average density of 11.1/sq mi (4.3/km^{2}). The racial makeup of the CDP was 98.68% White, and 1.32% from two or more races.

There were 38 households, out of which 15.8% had children under the age of 18 living with them, 65.8% were married couples living together, 2.6% had a female householder with no husband present, and 31.6% were non-families. 31.6% of all households were made up of individuals, and 10.5% had someone living alone who was 65 years of age or older. The average household size was 2.00 and the average family size was 2.46.

In the CDP, the population was spread out, with 11.8% under the age of 18, 5.3% from 18 to 24, 27.6% from 25 to 44, 30.3% from 45 to 64, and 25.0% who were 65 years of age or older. The median age was 48 years. For every 100 females, there were 117.1 males. For every 100 females age 18 and over, there were 131.0 males.

The median income for a household in the CDP was $40,000, and the median income for a family was $50,625. Males had a median income of $31,563 versus $33,000 for females. The per capita income for the CDP was $20,831. There were 8.8% of families and 7.9% of the population living below the poverty line, including no under eighteens and 25.0% of those over 64.

== Education ==
Public education in Cora is provided by Sublette County School District #1.

== Geography ==
According to the U.S. Census Bureau, the CDP has an area of 5.0 square miles (12.9 km^{2}), all land.

The town was listed on the National Register of Historic Places on April 24, 2017.

== Climate ==
According to the Köppen Climate Classification system, Cora has a subarctic climate, abbreviated "Dfc" on climate maps. The hottest temperature recorded in Cora was 95 °F (35 °C) on August 18, 1998, while the coldest temperature recorded was −46 °F (−43 °C) on December 22, 1990.

Climate data for Cora, Wyoming, 1991–2020 normals, extremes 1979–2013
Month	Jan	Feb	Mar	Apr	May	Jun	Jul	Aug	Sep	Oct	Nov	Dec	Year
Record high °F (°C)	52 (11)	50 (10)	60 (16)	74 (23)	82 (28)	88 (31)	91 (33)	95 (35)	85 (29)	76 (24)	62 (17)	50 (10)	95 (35)
Mean maximum °F (°C)	37.9 (3.3)	40.8 (4.9)	48.9 (9.4)	64.3 (17.9)	73.3 (22.9)	80.7 (27.1)	85.1 (29.5)	84.8 (29.3)	78.5 (25.8)	68.6 (20.3)	52.7 (11.5)	37.8 (3.2)	86.4 (30.2)
Mean daily maximum °F (°C)	25.6 (−3.6)	27.8 (−2.3)	36.7 (2.6)	48.3 (9.1)	59.1 (15.1)	69.2 (20.7)	77.9 (25.5)	76.8 (24.9)	67.7 (19.8)	52.7 (11.5)	36.8 (2.7)	27.0 (−2.8)	50.5 (10.3)
Daily mean °F (°C)	13.2 (−10.4)	15.1 (−9.4)	23.3 (−4.8)	34.6 (1.4)	43.0 (6.1)	51.4 (10.8)	58.7 (14.8)	57.0 (13.9)	48.9 (9.4)	37.5 (3.1)	24.1 (−4.4)	14.9 (−9.5)	35.1 (1.8)
Mean daily minimum °F (°C)	0.9 (−17.3)	2.4 (−16.4)	9.9 (−12.3)	21.0 (−6.1)	26.9 (−2.8)	33.6 (0.9)	39.4 (4.1)	37.3 (2.9)	30.1 (−1.1)	22.2 (−5.4)	11.3 (−11.5)	2.7 (−16.3)	19.8 (−6.8)
Mean minimum °F (°C)	−20.5 (−29.2)	−21.0 (−29.4)	−9.3 (−22.9)	5.8 (−14.6)	15.2 (−9.3)	22.4 (−5.3)	30.5 (−0.8)	27.4 (−2.6)	18.9 (−7.3)	8.4 (−13.1)	−11.1 (−23.9)	−19.9 (−28.8)	−26.5 (−32.5)
Record low °F (°C)	−36 (−38)	−40 (−40)	−26 (−32)	−11 (−24)	6 (−14)	14 (−10)	23 (−5)	20 (−7)	4 (−16)	−7 (−22)	−31 (−35)	−46 (−43)	−46 (−43)
Average precipitation inches (mm)	0.57 (14)	0.64 (16)	0.53 (13)	0.76 (19)	1.66 (42)	1.26 (32)	0.96 (24)	1.22 (31)	1.74 (44)	0.84 (21)	0.77 (20)	0.75 (19)	11.70 (297)
Average snowfall inches (cm)	11.7 (30)	11.4 (29)	8.2 (21)	5.2 (13)	4.1 (10)	0.3 (0.76)	0.0 (0.0)	0.0 (0.0)	1.0 (2.5)	3.6 (9.1)	10.6 (27)	14.5 (37)	70.6 (179.36)
Average precipitation days (≥ 0.01 in)	5.9	5.4	5.0	5.5	8.4	6.8	6.2	6.6	5.0	5.5	6.6	5.9	72.8
Average snowy days (≥ 0.1 in)	6.0	5.6	4.1	3.2	1.6	0.1	0.0	0.0	0.5	2.1	5.0	6.1	34.3
Source 1: National Weather Service
Source 2: NOAA (average snowfall/precipitation, snow days/precip days 1981–2010)

== See also ==
- List of census-designated places in Wyoming
- National Register of Historic Places listings in Sublette County, Wyoming
