= Finis Mitchell =

American politician

Finis Mitchell (November 14, 1901 – November 13, 1995) was an American mountaineer and forester based in Wyoming. During the Great Depression, he and his wife stocked lakes in the Wind River Range with over 2.5 million trout. He served in the Wyoming House of Representatives from 1955 to 1958. At the age of 67 he retired from his job as a railroad foreman and dedicated himself full-time to exploring and writing about the Wind River Range of mountains.

Over the course of his life, Mitchell climbed all but 20 of the 300 peaks in the range. At the age of 73, while on a glacier, he twisted his knee in a snow-covered crevasse. He hacked crude crutches out of pine wood and hobbled 18 miles to find a doctor, and was able to resume climbing until the age of 84, when further injury to the knee from a fall put an end to his solo climbing career. In 1975, he published a guidebook to the range called Wind River Trails; in 1977 the University of Wyoming gave him an honorary doctorate. The United States Congress named the mountain Mitchell Peak after him — one of the few landforms to ever be named after a living American.

After 1985, Mitchell continued to give talks about the Wind River area, free of charge, and to correspond with hikers seeking his counsel.

== Quotes ==
What, show people the wilderness that belongs to them and make them pay for it? I want them to come, all of them. Had a couple of hikers from Illinois and when they came down someone had written in the dust on their car, "Go home and stay." That's selfish, selfish.

— Finis Mitchell, quoted in Blundell

A mountain is the best medicine for a troubled mind. Seldom does man ponder his own insignificance. He thinks he is master of all things. He thinks the world is his without bonds. Nothing could be farther from the truth. Only when he tramps the mountains alone, communing with nature, observing other insignificant creatures about him, to come and go as he will, does he awaken to his own short-lived presence on earth.

— Finis Mitchell, "Wind River Trails" pg 97

In the wilderness man learns to have faith in his Creator.

— Finis Mitchell, "Wind River Trails" pg 71
