= Marbleton, Wyoming =

- Town
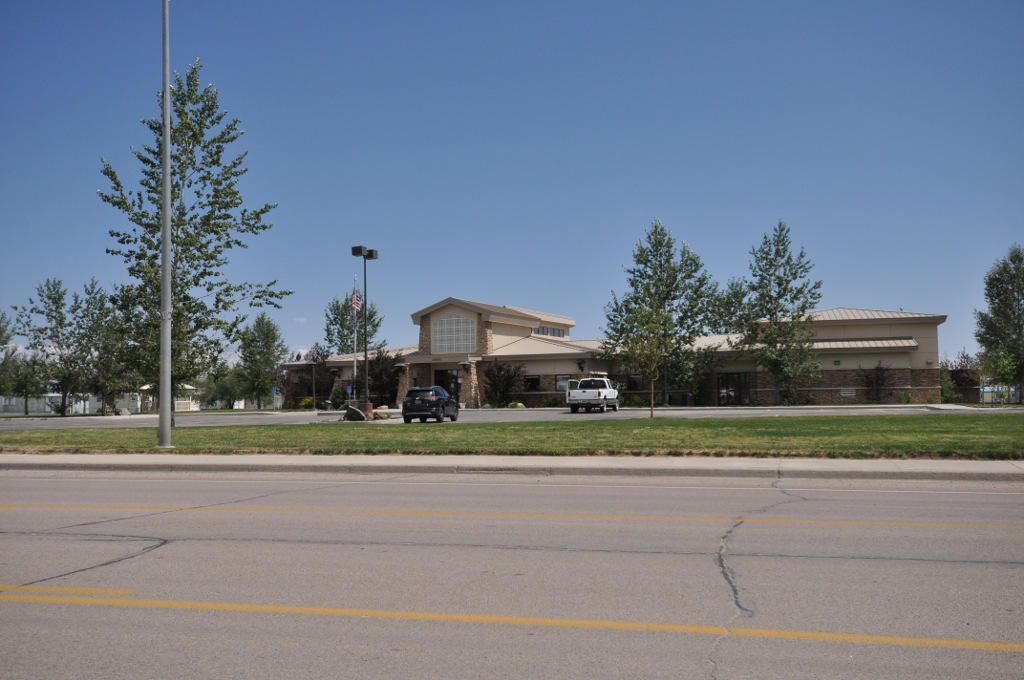
- City hall

- Location of Marbleton in Sublette County, Wyoming
- Coordinates: 42°33′27″N 110°06′02″W
- Country: United States
- State: Wyoming
- County: Sublette

Area
  - Total: 0.91 sq mi (2.35 km^{2})
  - Land: 0.91 sq mi (2.35 km^{2})
  - Water: 0 sq mi (0.00 km^{2})
- Elevation: 6,867 ft (2,093 m)

Population (2020)
  - Total: 861
  - Density: 1,224.6/sq mi (472.84/km^{2})
- Time zone: UTC-7 (Mountain (MST))
  - Summer (DST): UTC-6 (MDT)
- ZIP code: 83113
- Area code: 307
- FIPS code: 56-50415
- GNIS feature ID: 2412954
- Website: www.marbletonwyo.net

Marbleton is a town in Sublette County, Wyoming, United States. As of the 2020 census, Marbleton had a population of 861.

== Geography ==
According to the United States Census Bureau, the town has a total area of 0.86 square miles (2.23 km^{2}), all land.

== Climate ==
Marbleton has a subarctic climate (Koppen: Dfc), with generally warm, sometimes hot summers, and brutally cold and long winters. Diurnal temperature range is very high all year round, but even more so during summertime, with August having an average daily temperature range of 42 degrees Fahrenheit (23.3 Celsius). The nearest official weather station is in nearby Big Piney.

== Demographics ==
Historical population
Census	Pop.	Note	%±
1920	89		—
1930	26		−70.8%
1940	43		65.4%
1950	20		−53.5%
1960	189		845.0%
1970	223		18.0%
1980	537		140.8%
1990	634		18.1%
2000	720		13.6%
2010	1,094		51.9%
2020	861		−21.3%
U.S. Decennial Census

=== 2010 census ===
As of the census of 2010, there were 1,094 people, 415 households, and 273 families residing in the town. The population density was 1,272.1 inhabitants per square mile (491.2/km^{2}). There were 494 housing units at an average density of 574.4 per square mile (221.8/km^{2}). The racial makeup of the town was 87.4% White, 0.2% African American, 0.8% Native American, 0.2% Asian, 9.0% from other races, and 2.4% from two or more races. Hispanic or Latino of any race were 13.3% of the population.

There were 415 households, of which 38.3% had children under the age of 18 living with them, 49.2% were married couples living together, 7.5% had a female householder with no husband present, 9.2% had a male householder with no wife present, and 34.2% were non-families. 26.3% of all households were made up of individuals, and 6.7% had someone living alone who was 65 years of age or older. The average household size was 2.55 and the average family size was 3.05.

The median age in the town was 33 years. 27% of residents were under the age of 18; 9.9% were between the ages of 18 and 24; 30.6% were from 25 to 44; 24.6% were from 45 to 64; and 7.8% were 65 years of age or older. The gender makeup of the town was 56.9% male and 43.1% female.

=== 2000 census ===
As of the census of 2000, there were 720 people, 268 households, and 201 families residing in the town. The population density was 1,060.8 people per square mile (408.8/km^{2}). There were 310 housing units at an average density of 456.7 per square mile (176.0/km^{2}). The racial makeup of the town was 96.25% White, 0.42% African American, 0.69% Native American, 0.42% Asian, 0.14% Pacific Islander, 0.56% from other races, and 1.53% from two or more races. Hispanic or Latino of any race were 1.67% of the population.

There were 268 households, out of which 42.5% had children under the age of 18 living with them, 64.2% were married couples living together, 6.0% had a female householder with no husband present, and 25.0% were non-families. 20.1% of all households were made up of individuals, and 2.2% had someone living alone who was 65 years of age or older. The average household size was 2.69 and the average family size was 3.09.

In the town, the population was spread out, with 31.1% under the age of 18, 8.1% from 18 to 24, 33.1% from 25 to 44, 22.6% from 45 to 64, and 5.1% who were 65 years of age or older. The median age was 34 years. For every 100 females, there were 106.3 males. For every 100 females age 18 and over, there were 105.8 males.

The median income for a household in the town was $41,406, and the median income for a family was $46,250. Males had a median income of $38,250 versus $17,500 for females. The per capita income for the town was $18,446. About 3.2% of families and 4.2% of the population were below the poverty line, including 5.8% of those under age 18 and none of those age 65 or over.

== Education ==
Public education in the town of Marbleton is provided by Sublette County School District #9.
