= Big Piney, Wyoming =

- Town
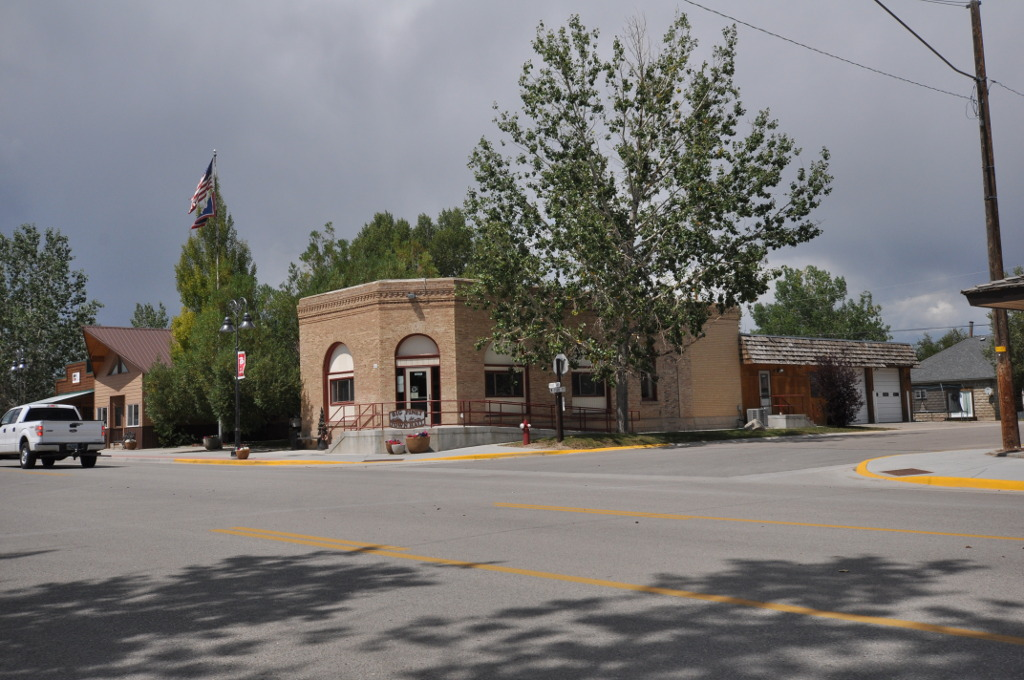
- City hall
- Nickname: Ice Box of the Nation
- Location of Big Piney in Sublette County, Wyoming
- Coordinates: 42°32′27″N 110°07′36″W
- Country: United States
- State: Wyoming
- County: Sublette

Area
  - Total: 0.51 sq mi (1.32 km^{2})
  - Land: 0.51 sq mi (1.32 km^{2})
  - Water: 0 sq mi (0.00 km^{2})
- Elevation: 6,824 ft (2,080 m)

Population (2020)
  - Total: 395
  - Density: 1,017.8/sq mi (392.99/km^{2})
- Time zone: UTC-7 (Mountain (MST))
  - Summer (DST): UTC-6 (MDT)
- ZIP code: 83113
- Area code: 307
- FIPS code: 56-07060
- GNIS feature ID: 2411687
- Website: Town of Big Piney Wyoming

Big Piney is a town in Sublette County, Wyoming, United States. As of the 2020 census, Big Piney had a population of 395.

It was incorporated in 1913.

== History ==
Big Piney is the oldest settlement in Sublette County. It was founded in 1879, when rancher Daniel B. Budd and his partner Hugh McKay came with a thousand head of cattle from Nevada hoping to ship them, but got caught instead in severe winter weather in the Green River Valley. The following year, Dan Budd relocated his family to what became Big Piney.

The town was named after Big Piney Creek. The creek took its name from the pine trees growing along the banks of the creek.

Cattle and oil have traditionally been the two primary industries for the area.

The Wardell Buffalo Trap, a canyon used by Native Americans to trap bison, is in the vicinity of Big Piney. Its potential archeological value led to its listing on the National Register of Historic Places in 1971.

=== Historical documentaries ===
In 1987, actress Glenn Close, daughter of one of the town's doctors, co-produced a documentary about the vanishing cowboy of the American West, entitled, "Do You Mean There Are Still Real Cowboys?" The film focused on several generations of cattle ranching families in Big Piney. It was first shown in 1988 as part of the PBS television series "The American Experience" and was narrated by actor Robert Redford.

Big Piney was one of four international locations chosen for the 2006 documentary film Comrades in Dreams, about the impact of local movie theaters in four different cultures (North Korea, Burkina Faso, India and Wyoming).

== Geography ==
According to the United States Census Bureau, the town has a total area of 0.45 square miles (1.17 km^{2}), all land.

=== Climate ===
Sometimes known as the "Ice Box of the Nation," Big Piney has one of the coldest climates among inhabited locations in the Lower 48. Big Piney experiences a semi-arid climate (Köppen BSk) with long, cold, dry winters and short, warm summers. Because of the high elevation and aridity, large diurnal temperature differences are a regular feature of Big Piney's climate. Precipitation is very low and somewhat concentrated in the warmer months.

Climate data for Big Piney, Wyoming (Miley Memorial Field), 1991–2020 normals, extremes 1948–2014
Month	Jan	Feb	Mar	Apr	May	Jun	Jul	Aug	Sep	Oct	Nov	Dec	Year
Record high °F (°C)	48 (9)	54 (12)	64 (18)	75 (24)	84 (29)	91 (33)	96 (36)	93 (34)	89 (32)	79 (26)	67 (19)	55 (13)	96 (36)
Mean maximum °F (°C)	42.2 (5.7)	44.5 (6.9)	54.8 (12.7)	67.3 (19.6)	76.2 (24.6)	84.0 (28.9)	88.3 (31.3)	86.7 (30.4)	81.8 (27.7)	73.3 (22.9)	55.7 (13.2)	44.1 (6.7)	89.0 (31.7)
Mean daily maximum °F (°C)	26.7 (−2.9)	29.6 (−1.3)	41.1 (5.1)	51.9 (11.1)	61.8 (16.6)	72.3 (22.4)	81.9 (27.7)	79.8 (26.6)	69.7 (20.9)	55.0 (12.8)	39.4 (4.1)	27.6 (−2.4)	53.1 (11.7)
Daily mean °F (°C)	11.7 (−11.3)	14.9 (−9.5)	26.9 (−2.8)	36.4 (2.4)	45.3 (7.4)	54.2 (12.3)	61.9 (16.6)	60.1 (15.6)	50.8 (10.4)	38.2 (3.4)	24.4 (−4.2)	12.7 (−10.7)	36.5 (2.5)
Mean daily minimum °F (°C)	−3.3 (−19.6)	0.2 (−17.7)	12.7 (−10.7)	20.8 (−6.2)	28.9 (−1.7)	36.1 (2.3)	42.0 (5.6)	40.4 (4.7)	31.8 (−0.1)	21.4 (−5.9)	9.4 (−12.6)	−2.2 (−19.0)	19.9 (−6.7)
Mean minimum °F (°C)	−28.6 (−33.7)	−23.6 (−30.9)	−13.9 (−25.5)	6.5 (−14.2)	17.4 (−8.1)	26.5 (−3.1)	29.8 (−1.2)	24.9 (−3.9)	14.4 (−9.8)	3.7 (−15.7)	−12.8 (−24.9)	−25.1 (−31.7)	−34.9 (−37.2)
Record low °F (°C)	−49 (−45)	−44 (−42)	−32 (−36)	−5 (−21)	0 (−18)	13 (−11)	23 (−5)	16 (−9)	5 (−15)	−23 (−31)	−34 (−37)	−50 (−46)	−50 (−46)
Average precipitation inches (mm)	0.44 (11)	0.37 (9.4)	0.42 (11)	0.69 (18)	1.22 (31)	1.01 (26)	0.89 (23)	0.87 (22)	0.64 (16)	0.62 (16)	0.26 (6.6)	0.23 (5.8)	7.66 (195.8)
Average snowfall inches (cm)	4.1 (10)	4.2 (11)	4.3 (11)	3.6 (9.1)	1.3 (3.3)	0.2 (0.51)	0.0 (0.0)	0.0 (0.0)	0.7 (1.8)	2.1 (5.3)	4.2 (11)	3.9 (9.9)	28.6 (72.91)
Average extreme snow depth inches (cm)	5 (13)	7 (18)	5 (13)	1 (2.5)	0 (0)	0 (0)	0 (0)	0 (0)	0 (0)	1 (2.5)	2 (5.1)	3 (7.6)	7 (18)
Average precipitation days (≥ 0.01 in)	4.0	4.7	5.0	6.4	8.3	5.8	5.9	5.8	6.0	5.2	3.9	3.9	64.9
Average snowy days (≥ 0.1 in)	3.9	3.2	2.9	2.2	0.5	0.1	0.0	0.0	0.3	1.2	2.4	3.2	19.9
Source 1: NOAA
Source 2: National Weather Service (snow depth 1988-2001) WRCC (mean maxima, mean minima, average snowfall, NWS snowy days 1948–2014)

== Demographics ==
Historical population
Census	Pop.	Note	%±
1920	173		—
1930	184		6.4%
1940	241		31.0%
1950	206		−14.5%
1960	663		221.8%
1970	570		−14.0%
1980	530		−7.0%
1990	454		−14.3%
2000	408		−10.1%
2010	552		35.3%
2020	395		−28.4%
U.S. Decennial Census

=== 2010 census ===
As of the census of 2010, there were 552 people, 228 households, and 131 families residing in the town. The population density was 1,226.7 inhabitants per square mile (473.6/km^{2}). There were 282 housing units at an average density of 626.7 per square mile (242.0/km^{2}). The racial makeup of the town was 92.8% White, 0.9% African American, 1.4% Native American, 0.4% Asian, 4.0% from other races, and 0.5% from two or more races. Hispanic or Latino of any race were 6.7% of the population.

There were 228 households, of which 30.7% had children under the age of 18 living with them, 47.8% were married couples living together, 4.4% had a female householder with no husband present, 5.3% had a male householder with no wife present, and 42.5% were non-families. 31.1% of all households were made up of individuals, and 9.7% had someone living alone who was 65 years of age or older. The average household size was 2.42 and the average family size was 3.17.

The median age in the town was 35.8 years. 24.8% of residents were under the age of 18; 5.6% were between the ages of 18 and 24; 30.2% were from 25 to 44; 26.8% were from 45 to 64; and 12.5% were 65 years of age or older. The gender makeup of the town was 54.9% male and 45.1% female.

=== 2000 census ===
As of the census of 2000, there were 408 people, 161 households, and 113 families residing in the town. The population density was 1,055.3 people per square mile (403.9/km^{2}). There were 192 housing units at an average density of 496.6 per square mile (190.1/km^{2}). The racial makeup of the town was 98.53% White, 0.98% Native American, and 0.49% from two or more races. Hispanic or Latino of any race were 1.72% of the population.

There were 161 households, out of which 34.2% had children under the age of 18 living with them, 62.7% were married couples living together, 5.0% had a female householder with no husband present, and 29.8% were non-families. 27.3% of all households were made up of individuals, and 6.8% had someone living alone who was 65 years of age or older. The average household size was 2.53 and the average family size was 3.12.

In the town, the population was spread out, with 28.9% under the age of 18, 6.9% from 18 to 24, 31.4% from 25 to 44, 22.1% from 45 to 64, and 10.8% who were 65 years of age or older. The median age was 37 years. For every 100 females, there were 99.0 males. For every 100 females age 18 and over, there were 102.8 males.

The median income for a household in the town was $36,346, and the median income for a family was $50,833. Males had a median income of $41,964 versus $18,750 for females. The per capita income for the town was $17,647. About 10.2% of families and 11.5% of the population were below the poverty line, including 15.8% of those under age 18 and 3.1% of those age 65 or over.

== Government ==
Big Piney has a mayor and town council. Shane Voss is Mayor until 2027. Sierra Banks is Mayor Pro Tem from 2025 to 2029.

== Arts and culture ==
Green River Valley Museum focuses on local history. There are seven buildings, each with several exhibits.

July 3rd and 4th the town celebrates Chuckwagon Days. Later in July Big Piney hosts the Sublette County Fair.

== Education ==
Public education in the town of Big Piney is provided by Sublette County School District #9. Schools serving the town include Big Piney Elementary School (grades K-5), Big Piney Middle School (grades 6–8), and Big Piney High School (grades 9–12).

== See also ==
- List of municipalities in Wyoming
