= Sublette County School District Number 9 =

School district in Wyoming, United States

Sublette County School District #9 is a public school district based in Big Piney, Wyoming, United States.

== Geography ==
Sublette County School District #9 serves southwestern Sublette County and a portion of northeastern Lincoln County, including the following communities:

- Incorporated places
  - Town of Big Piney
  - Town of La Barge
  - Town of Marbleton
- Census-designated places (Note: All census-designated places are unincorporated.)
  - Calpet

It also includes a portion of the Fontenelle CDP in Lincoln County.

== Schools ==
- Big Piney High School (Grades 9–12)
- Big Piney Middle School (Grades 6–8)
- Big Piney Elementary School (Grades K-5)
- La Barge Elementary School (Grades K-5)

== Student demographics ==
The following figures are as of October 1, 2008.

- Total District Enrollment: 691
- Student enrollment by gender
  - Male: 367 (53.11%)
  - Female: 324 (46.89%)
- Student enrollment by ethnicity
  - White (not Hispanic): 602 (87.12%)
  - Hispanic: 57 (8.25%)
  - American Indian or Alaskan Native: 26 (3.76%)
  - Black (not Hispanic): 6 (0.87%)

== See also ==
- List of school districts in Wyoming
