= Calpet, Wyoming =

- Unincorporated community
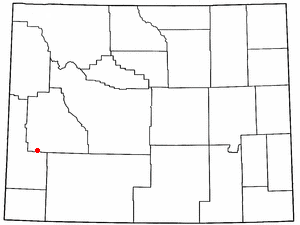
- Location of Calpet, Wyoming
- Coordinates: 42°17′26″N 110°16′57″W
- Country: United States
- State: Wyoming
- County: Sublette

Area
  - Total: 4.6 sq mi (12.0 km^{2})
  - Land: 4.6 sq mi (12.0 km^{2})
  - Water: 0 sq mi (0.0 km^{2})
- Elevation: 6,827 ft (2,081 m)

Population (2000)
  - Total: 7
  - Density: 1.6/sq mi (0.6/km^{2})
- Time zone: UTC-7 (Mountain (MST))
  - Summer (DST): UTC-6 (MDT)
- Area code: 307
- FIPS code: 56-11845
- GNIS feature ID: 2407939

Calpet is an unincorporated community in Sublette County, Wyoming, United States. The population was 7 at the 2000 census, when it was a census-designated place (CDP).

The community was named for the California Petroleum Company.

== Geography ==
According to the United States Census Bureau, in 2000 the CDP has a total area of 4.6 square miles (12.0 km^{2}), all land.

== Demographics ==
As of the census of 2000, there were 7 people, 3 households, and 2 families residing in the CDP. The population density was 1.5 people per square mile (0.6/km^{2}). There were 5 housing units at an average density of 1.1/sq mi (0.4/km^{2}). The racial makeup of the CDP was 100.00% White.

There were 3 households, out of which 66.7% had children under the age of 18 living with them, 33.3% were married couples living together, and 33.3% were non-families. No households were made up of individuals, and none had someone living alone who was 65 years of age or older. The average household size was 2.33 and the average family size was 2.50.

In the CDP the population was spread out, with 28.6% under the age of 18 and 71.4% from 45 to 64. The median age was 50 years. For every 100 females, there were 250.0 males. For every 100 females age 18 and over, there were 150.0 males.

The median income for a household in the CDP was $53,750, and the median income for a family was $53,750. Males had a median income of $43,750 versus $11,250 for females. The per capita income for the CDP was $17,067. None of the population or the families were below the poverty line.

== Education ==
Public education in the town of Big Piney is provided by Sublette County School District #9.
