= Sublette County, Wyoming =

County in Wyoming, United States

- County
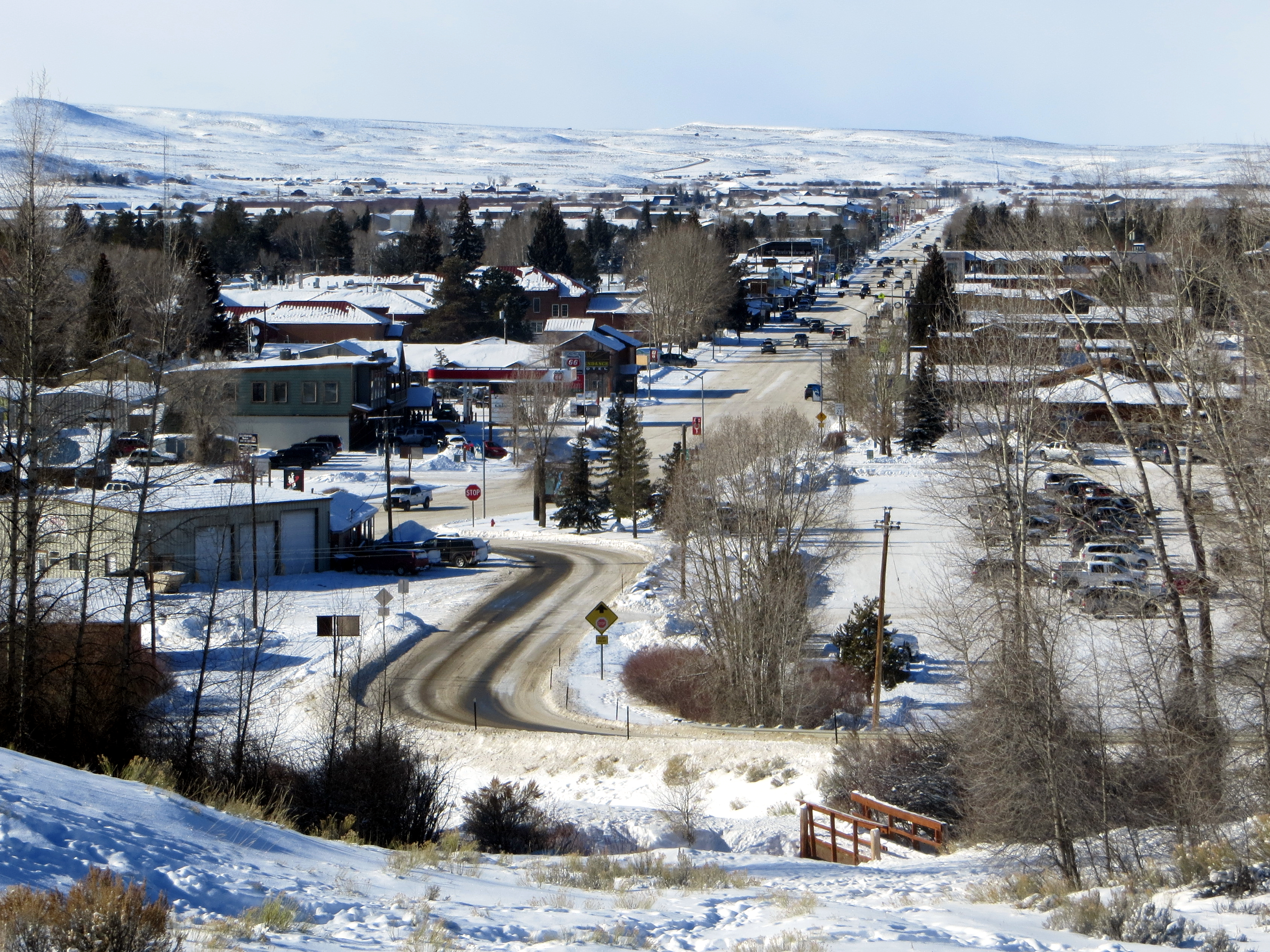
- Pinedale, Wyoming

- Location within the U.S. state of Wyoming
- Coordinates: 42°46′N 109°55′W
- Country: United States
- State: Wyoming
- Founded: February 15, 1921(authorized); 1923 (organized)
- Named for: William Sublette
- Seat: Pinedale
- Largest town: Pinedale

Area
  - Total: 4,936 sq mi (12,780 km^{2})
  - Land: 4,887 sq mi (12,660 km^{2})
  - Water: 49 sq mi (130 km^{2}) 1.0%

Population (2020)
  - Total: 8,728
  - Estimate (2025): 8,929 ▲
  - Density: 1.786/sq mi (0.6896/km^{2})
- Time zone: UTC−7 (Mountain)
  - Summer (DST): UTC−6 (MDT)
- Congressional district: At-large
- Website: www.sublettecountywy.gov

Sublette County is a county in the U.S. state of Wyoming. As of the 2020 United States census, the population was 8,728. The county seat is Pinedale. It is a sparsely populated rural county in western Wyoming, along the Green River.

== History ==
Sublette County was created February 15, 1921, of land partitioned from Fremont and Lincoln counties. Its governing organization was completed by 1923. Before settlement, the western Wyoming mountains were traversed and harvested by fur trappers and traders. Sublette County is named for one of those early characters, William Lewis Sublette. Today the county celebrates its fur trade heritage with the Museum of the Mountain Man in Pinedale. In the early 1900s the majority of the population in what is today Sublette County were first generation immigrants from England and Germany. A majority of the population in Sublette County supported America's entry into World War I and at the time the county was known for its "pro-British" sentiments. The German immigrants in the county were not anti-British, and most of them were outspoken about England being their favorite foreign country other than Germany, however they did support neutrality and want America to stay out of the war. Even during the war, relations between first generation English immigrants and first generation German immigrants were known for being exceptionally cordial (Sublette County, Wyoming stood out in this regard because this was not the norm nation-wide).

== Geography ==
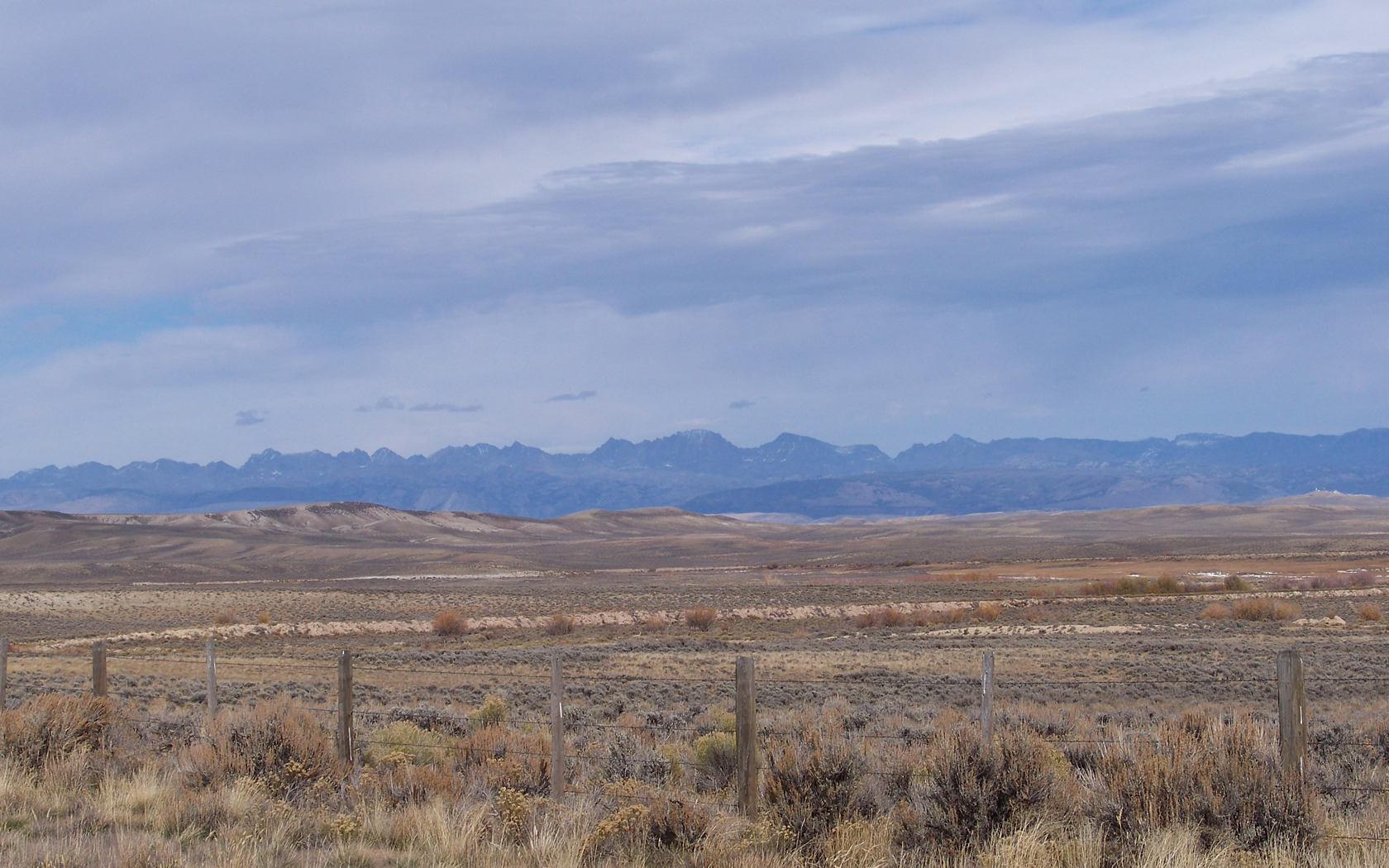
Wind River Range from US 191 just south of Daniel, Wyoming

According to the US Census Bureau, the county has a total area of 4,936 square miles (12,780 km^{2}), of which 4,887 square miles (12,660 km^{2}) is land and 49 square miles (130 km^{2}) (1.0%) is water.

=== Adjacent counties ===
- Fremont County – east
- Sweetwater County – southeast
- Lincoln County – southwest
- Teton County - northwest

=== National protected areas ===
- Bridger National Forest (part)
- Shoshone National Forest (part)
- Teton National Forest (part)

At present, Bridger National Forest and Teton National Forest are administratively combined into the Bridger-Teton National Forest. Sublette County contains portions of both original forests.

== Demographics ==
Historical population
Census	Pop.	Note	%±
1930	1,944		—
1940	2,778		42.9%
1950	2,481		−10.7%
1960	3,778		52.3%
1970	3,755		−0.6%
1980	4,548		21.1%
1990	4,843		6.5%
2000	5,920		22.2%
2010	10,247		73.1%
2020	8,728		−14.8%
2025 (est.)	8,929	▲	2.3%
US Decennial Census; 1870–2000 2010–2016

=== 2020 census ===
As of the 2020 census, the county had a population of 8,728. Of the residents, 24.3% were under the age of 18 and 18.6% were 65 years of age or older; the median age was 41.5 years. For every 100 females there were 111.6 males, and for every 100 females age 18 and over there were 108.4 males.

Sublette County, Wyoming – Racial and ethnic composition Note: the US Census treats Hispanic/Latino as an ethnic category. This table excludes Latinos from the racial categories and assigns them to a separate category. Hispanics/Latinos may be of any race.
Race / Ethnicity (NH = Non-Hispanic)	Pop 2000	Pop 2010	Pop 2020	% 2000	% 2010	% 2020
White alone (NH)	5,709	9,260	7,651	96.44%	90.37%	87.66%
Black or African American alone (NH)	12	30	17	0.20%	0.29%	0.19%
Native American or Alaska Native alone (NH)	27	79	44	0.46%	0.77%	0.50%
Asian alone (NH)	11	51	46	0.19%	0.50%	0.53%
Pacific Islander alone (NH)	5	1	10	0.08%	0.01%	0.11%
Other race alone (NH)	0	4	45	0.00%	0.04%	0.52%
Mixed race or Multiracial (NH)	44	110	279	0.74%	1.07%	3.20%
Hispanic or Latino (any race)	112	712	636	1.89%	6.95%	7.29%
Total	5,920	10,247	8,728	100.00%	100.00%	100.00%

The racial makeup of the county was 89.2% White, 0.2% Black or African American, 0.6% American Indian and Alaska Native, 0.6% Asian, 3.3% from some other race, and 6.0% from two or more races. Hispanic or Latino residents of any race comprised 7.3% of the population.

There were 3,606 households in the county, of which 29.8% had children under the age of 18 living with them and 16.1% had a female householder with no spouse or partner present. About 27.4% of all households were made up of individuals and 10.5% had someone living alone who was 65 years of age or older.

There were 5,167 housing units, of which 30.2% were vacant. Among occupied housing units, 73.8% were owner-occupied and 26.2% were renter-occupied. The homeowner vacancy rate was 3.1% and the rental vacancy rate was 18.3%.

=== 2010 census ===
As of the 2010 United States census, there were 10,247 people, 3,906 households, and 2,594 families in the county. The population density was 2.1 people per square mile (0.81 people/km^{2}). There were 5,770 housing units at an average density of 1.2 units per square mile (0.46 units/km^{2}). The racial makeup of the county was 93.2% white, 0.8% American Indian, 0.5% Asian, 0.3% black or African American, 3.7% from other races, and 1.4% from two or more races. Those of Hispanic or Latino origin made up 6.9% of the population. In terms of ancestry, 31.8% were German, 22.0% were English, 11.3% were Irish, 6.3% were American, and 5.1% were Scottish.

Of the 3,906 households, 32.0% had children under the age of 18 living with them, 56.3% were married couples living together, 5.1% had a female householder with no husband present, 33.6% were non-families, and 25.6% of all households were made up of individuals. The average household size was 2.48 and the average family size was 2.99. The median age was 38.3 years.

The median income for a household in the county was $70,147 and the median income for a family was $81,389. Males had a median income of $51,125 versus $31,940 for females. The per capita income for the county was $31,433. About 2.7% of families and 4.2% of the population were below the poverty line, including 2.2% of those under age 18 and 1.1% of those age 65 or over.

== Communities ==
=== Towns ===
- Big Piney
- Marbleton
- Pinedale (county seat)

=== Census-designated places ===
- Bondurant
- Boulder
- Cora
- Daniel

=== Unincorporated community ===
- Calpet

== Government and politics ==
Like most of Wyoming, Sublette County is overwhelmingly Republican. Since it was created in 1921, the solitary Democrat to carry the county was Franklin D. Roosevelt, who won a majority against Herbert Hoover in 1932 and a twenty-nine vote plurality against Alf Landon four years later. Since 1968 no Democrat has reached twenty-nine percent of Sublette County's ballots, and the only occasions a Republican has failed to pass seventy percent were when Ross Perot took substantial numbers of votes in 1992 and 1996.

United States presidential election results for Sublette County, Wyoming
Year	Republican		Democratic		Third party(ies)	
Year	No.	%	No.	%	No.	%
1924	570	67.38%	183	21.63%	93	10.99%
1928	573	64.02%	316	35.31%	6	0.67%
1932	512	43.69%	633	54.01%	27	2.30%
1936	638	47.68%	667	49.85%	33	2.47%
1940	771	54.99%	627	44.72%	4	0.29%
1944	683	59.24%	470	40.76%	0	0.00%
1948	622	55.24%	496	44.05%	8	0.71%
1952	1,013	74.54%	344	25.31%	2	0.15%
1956	901	71.96%	351	28.04%	0	0.00%
1960	978	60.22%	646	39.78%	0	0.00%
1964	900	53.22%	791	46.78%	0	0.00%
1968	1,152	68.25%	310	18.36%	226	13.39%
1972	1,348	81.55%	304	18.39%	1	0.06%
1976	1,284	70.32%	528	28.92%	14	0.77%
1980	1,538	73.87%	357	17.15%	187	8.98%
1984	1,976	82.47%	389	16.24%	31	1.29%
1988	1,636	72.81%	576	25.63%	35	1.56%
1992	1,168	45.38%	536	20.82%	870	33.80%
1996	1,829	62.15%	677	23.00%	437	14.85%
2000	2,624	81.59%	458	14.24%	134	4.17%
2004	2,847	77.98%	730	19.99%	74	2.03%
2008	3,316	76.12%	936	21.49%	104	2.39%
2012	3,472	79.34%	767	17.53%	137	3.13%
2016	3,409	77.65%	644	14.67%	337	7.68%
2020	3,957	79.62%	882	17.75%	131	2.64%
2024	3,905	79.31%	920	18.68%	99	2.01%

Sublette County is managed by a county commission with three members. In 2011, Sublette County residents petitioned voters to approve an increase in this number to five as allowed under Wyoming law. The ballot initiative passed and five commissioners were to be seated during the 2012 election cycle.

In early 2012, another ballot initiative was presented to voters requesting their approval to decrease the number of county commissioners back to three even before seating the two additional commissioners. This second special election, held on May 8, 2012, returned the commission to its previous number of three.

== Education ==
School districts include Sublette County School District 1 and Sublette County School District 9.

== Media references ==
- In 2007, The New Yorker reported on the rising crime rate, influx of roughnecks and methamphetamine, the decline in ranching, and environmental damage associated with the county's oil boom.
- In 1965, The New Yorker described a trip along the Green River that set out from the Circle S Ranch in Cora.

== See also ==
- National Register of Historic Places listings in Sublette County, Wyoming
- Wyoming
  - List of cities and towns in Wyoming
  - List of counties in Wyoming
  - Wyoming statistical areas
