= Wyoming Highway 374 =

State highway in Wyoming, United States

Wyoming Highway 374
- WYO 374 highlighted in red

Route information
- Maintained by WYDOT
- Length: 25.37 mi (40.83 km)

Western segment
- Length: 4.94 mi (7.95 km)
- West end: I-80
- East end: US 30 south of Granger

Eastern segment
- Length: 20.43 mi (32.88 km)
- West end: I-80 / US 30 in Little America
- East end: I-80 BL / US 30 to WYO 530 in Green River

Location
- Country: United States
- State: Wyoming
- Counties: Sweetwater

Highway system
- Wyoming State Highway System; Interstate; US; State
← WYO 372	→ WYO 375
← WYO 28	→ WYO 30

Wyoming Highway 374 (WYO 374) is a 25.37-mile-long (40.83 km) discontinuous east–west Wyoming State Road located in Sweetwater County that exists in two sections, with a short gap in between.

== Route description ==
Wyoming Highway 374 begins its western end at exit 61 of Interstate 80, southwest of Granger. WYO 374 travels along the north side of I-80, acting as a frontage road, for just under 5 miles until it reaches U.S. Route 30 where it temporarily ends. Further east along I-80/US 30, Highway 374 resumes at exit 68 at Little America. WYO 374 once again travels along the north side of I-80. At approximately 3.5 miles, Tenneco Road (CR 85) is intersected which provides access to exit 72 of I-80/US 30. Further east, Highway 374 reaches the southern terminus of Wyoming Highway 372 (La Barge Road) at a T intersection. WYO 372 travels north from here to Wyoming Highway 28 and U.S. Route 189 while WYO 374 turns south and immediately intersects exit 83 of I-80/US 30. Now Highway 374 travels eastward toward Green River on the south side of the interstate. As WYO 374 enters James Town, a census-designated place (CDP) west of Green River, Covered Wagon Road (CR 59) is intersected which provides access to exit 85 of I-80/US 30 and travels north to the Rolling Green Country Club. Shortly after, Highway 374 crosses the Green River and at 20.43 miles (25.37 total) the highway reaches its eastern terminus at the Green River business routes of I-80 and US 30 (Flaming Gorge Way) in Green River. Traveling north of here is exit 89 of I-80/US 30, while traveling south heads into downtown Green River and to Wyoming Highway 530.

Wyoming Highway 374 is not signed at any of its interchanges with Interstate 80.

== History ==
Wyoming Highway 374 is the original alignment of U.S. Route 30 from near Granger to Green River.

== Major intersections ==
The entire route is in Sweetwater County.

=== Unsigned segment ===
Location	mi	km	Destinations	Notes
	0.00	0.00	I-80 – Green River, Evanston	Western terminus of unsigned segment; I-80 exit 61
Granger Junction	4.94	7.95	US 30	Eastern terminus of unsigned segment
1.000 mi = 1.609 km; 1.000 km = 0.621 mi

=== Signed segment ===
The entire route is in Sweetwater County.

Location	mi	km	Destinations	Notes
Little America	0.000	0.000	I-80 / US 30 – Rock Springs, Evanston	Western terminus; I-80 exit 68
	3.42	5.50	Westvaco Road to I-80 / US 30	I-80 exit 72
	14.07	22.64	WYO 372	Southern terminus of WYO 372
	14.15	22.77	I-80 / US 30 – Green River, Evanston	I-80 exit 83
James Town	16.84	27.10	Covered Wagon Road to I-80 (US 30)	I-80 exit 85
Green River	20.662	33.252	Flaming Gorge Way (I-80 BL / US 30 Bus.)	Eastern terminus
1.000 mi = 1.609 km; 1.000 km = 0.621 mi
