= U.S. Route 30 in Wyoming =

Section of U.S. Highway in Wyoming, United States

U.S. Highway 30
- US 30 highlighted in red

Route information
- Maintained by WYDOT
- Length: 453.936 mi (730.539 km)
- Existed: 1926–present
- Tourist routes: Lincoln Highway

Major junctions
- West end: US 30 at the Idaho state line near Cokeville
- US 189 in Kemmerer; I-80 (numerous times); US 191 in Rock Springs; US 287 from Rawlins to Laramie; I-80 BL in Cheyenne; I-25 / US 87 in Cheyenne; I-180 / I-25 BL / US 85 in Cheyenne
- East end: US 30 at the Nebraska state line in Pine Bluffs

Location
- Country: United States
- State: Wyoming
- Counties: Lincoln, Sweetwater, Carbon, Albany, Laramie

Highway system
- United States Numbered Highway System; List; Special; Divided; Wyoming State Highway System; Interstate; US; State
← WYO 28	→ WYO 30

U.S. Highway 30 (US 30) is part of the United States Numbered Highway System that runs from Astoria, Oregon, to Atlantic City, New Jersey. Within the U.S. state of Wyoming, it runs 454 miles (731 km) from Cokeville to Pine Bluffs by way of Kemmerer, Rock Springs, Laramie, and Cheyenne. The route runs mostly along the historic Lincoln Highway. It parallels Interstate 80 (I-80) throughout the state, and the two highways intersect and share three concurrencies.

== Route description ==
US 30 enters Lincoln County from Bear Lake County, Idaho. Shortly after, it intersects Wyoming Highway 89 (WYO 89), which runs northward to the Idaho state line, becoming Idaho State Highway 61, subsequently intersecting with US 89. WYO 89 latches onto US 30 coming south. The road turns southeast, and the two routes begin a concurrency.

Cokeville is the first civilized town that the routes enter. Here, they meet WYO 232, which continues into the town limits. Immediately after that junction, US 30 and WYO 89 leave the town and continue through dry, sandy plains with some farmland scattered on the sides. Through here, the road largely parallels Cokeville Meadows National Wildlife Refuge as the two routes continue south. Eventually, WYO 89 leaves US 30 just west of Kemmerer as US 30 continues alone to the city itself.

Shortly before reaching the city limits, US 30 splits off to enter the city center while a bypass route bends south to avoid Kemmerer entirely. In the city, US 30 meets US 189. The latter route turns southeastward, and the two routes are concurrent through the city on Pine Avenue. Briefly after passing Onyx Street, the road becomes Coral Street, then Fossil Drive as US 30 and US 189 turn nearly due south to enter Diamondville. The road turns entirely in a due west direction as US 30 and US 189 leave the city a mile (1.6 km) later at the intersection of Lincoln Street and Spring Valley Drive, and US 30 and US 189 enter rural areas. The section of US 30 west of Kemmerer is planned to be rerouted to parallel the Union Pacific Railroad as part of a project to expand a nearby coal mine. The Wyoming Department of Transportation has announced that this project would provide more jobs and economic benefits.

US 30 rejoins its bypass route splitting off from US 189, which continues further south towards Evanston. Continuing east, the road runs through dry farmland without any junctions for a few miles until the town of Opal, where it meets WYO 240, though, unlike Cokeville, it does not enter the town directly. After that junction, US 30 once again runs through rocky soil and grassy plains.

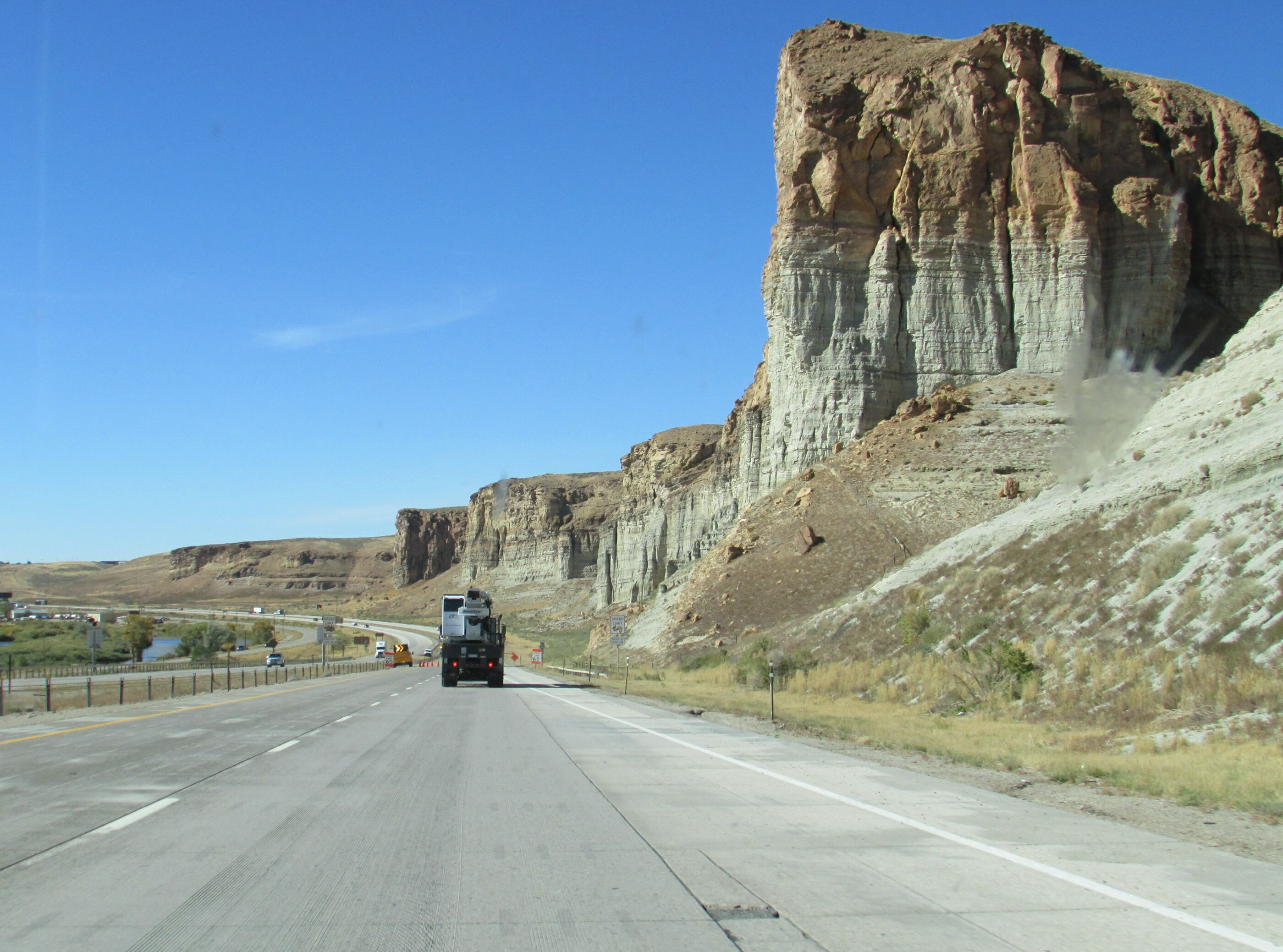
US 30 through the buttes of Green River

Entering Sweetwater County, the road intersects I-80 near Granger as it merges on to the Interstate for the first time, and the two are concurrent for a very long distance (169 miles (272 km)). Through their concurrency, I-80/US 30 intersect WYO 372 near James Town, business routes of I-80/US 30 in Green River, and share a brief concurrency with US 191 to Rock Springs, where US 191 splits off after entering the downtown area. After this, I-80/US 30 have no major intersections for nearly 60 miles (97 km).

I-80/US 30 enters Carbon County, where the next major intersection is in Rawlins. Here, US 287 joins the concurrency. The three routes are concurrent for 20 miles (32 km) as they pass by Sinclair to intersect the eastern terminus of WYO 76. In Walcott, US 30 and US 287 split off from I-80. The two routes follow the length of the Medicine Bow Mountains as they run through Medicine Bow, and then they enter Albany County. They continue through Wilcox, Rock River, Lookout, and Bosler, before reaching Laramie, the next major city, and home to the University of Wyoming. Within Laramie, another business route of I-80 joins and becomes concurrent with US 30 and US 287 on 3rd Street. Once they reach Grand Avenue, I-80 Business (I-80 Bus.)/US 30 turn east on Grand Avenue while US 287 continues south on 3rd Street even further into downtown Laramie.

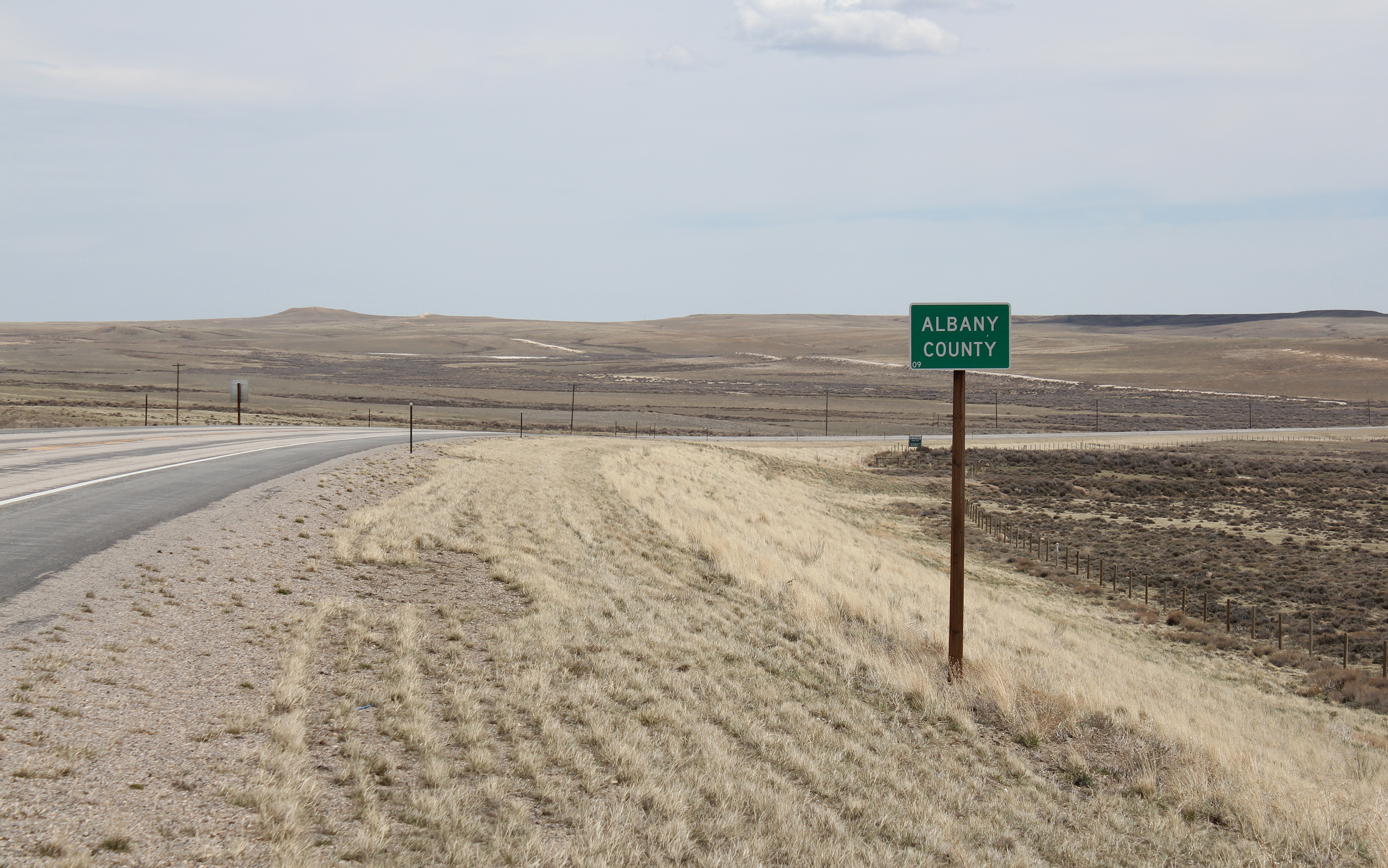
US 30/US 287 entering Albany County

US 30 rejoins I-80 east of Laramie, where the two routes pass by numerous mountain ranges. They also pass an exit for numerous campgrounds, as well as an Abraham Lincoln Memorial Monument. The monument was chosen as "Roadside America's Sight of the Week". They pass through Buford, along with several climbing areas and state parks dotting the sides of the route. There are several scenic sites to see along the road while driving in this part of the area. The road then enters Laramie County, the final county in the state that both I-80 and US 30 pass through. West of Cheyenne, the state capital, the routes pass by a large wind farm and follow a gap of bumpy hills in the area. The first major interchange approaching Cheyenne is with WYO 222. Both I-80 and US 30 enter Cheyenne, but not together. At the interchange with WYO 225, one more I-80 Bus. breaks off, and so does US 30 along with the business route.

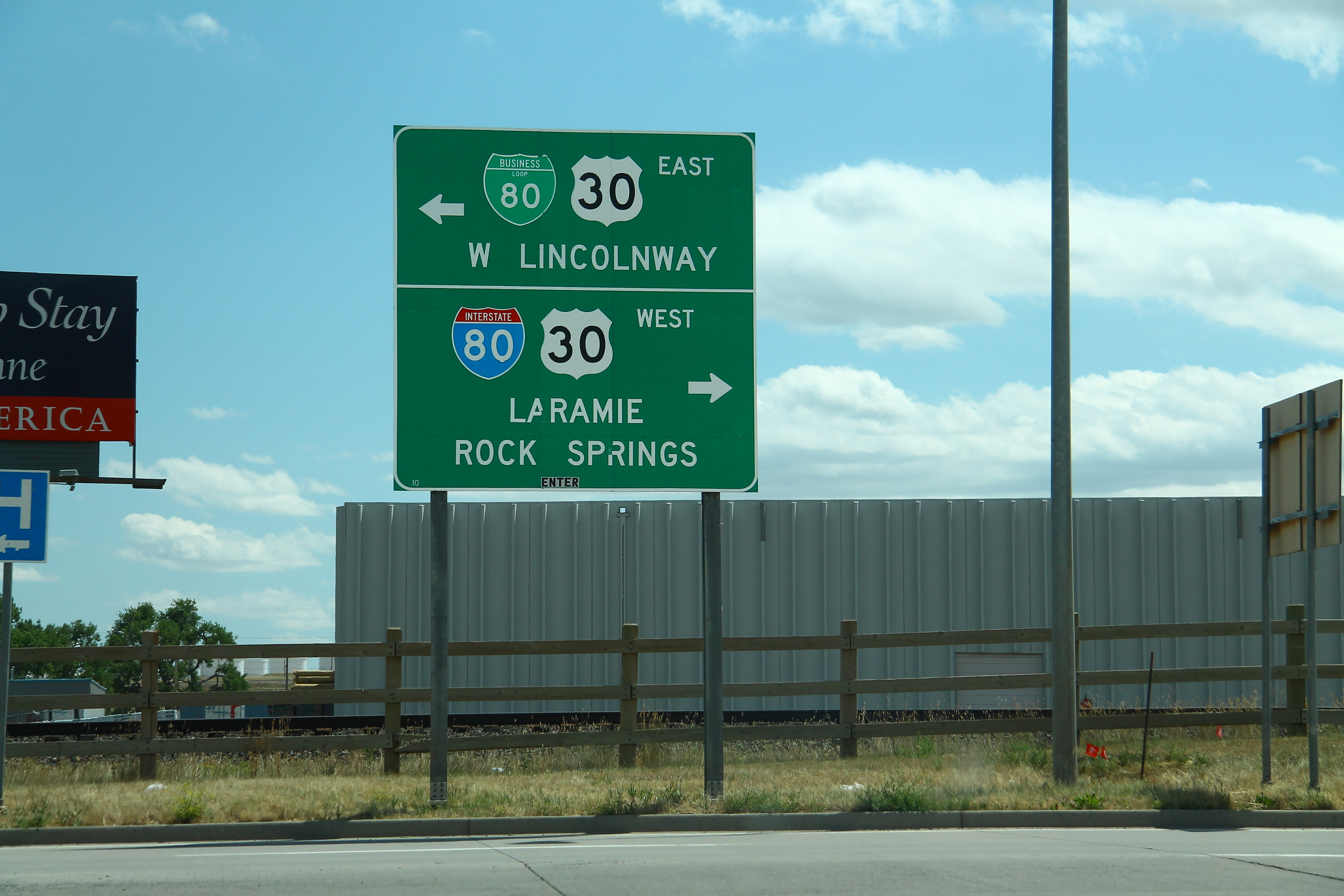
US 30 at its intersection with I-80 and I-80 Bus. outside of Cheyenne

As I-80 Bus./US 30 enter the downtown area, they pass by numerous businesses, restaurants, and hotels lining the road. They intersect I-25 and US 87, the state's main north–south corridors. Continuing on East Lincolnway, the roads meet I-180, I-25 Bus., and US 85. Although I-180 is considered as an Interstate, it runs on surface roads, and thus is not conformed to Interstate standards. Since these roads are on one-way streets, southbound traffic uses Central Avenue and northbound traffic uses Warren Avenue, and US 30 intersects both of these streets separately. After leaving Cheyenne, it merges back on I-80 for the third and final time. They travel through Hillsdale and parallel the Union Pacific Railroad's Sidney Subdivision line. Once the routes reach Pine Bluffs, US 30 splits off into the town, and both of the routes continue into Kimball County, Nebraska separate from each other.

== History ==
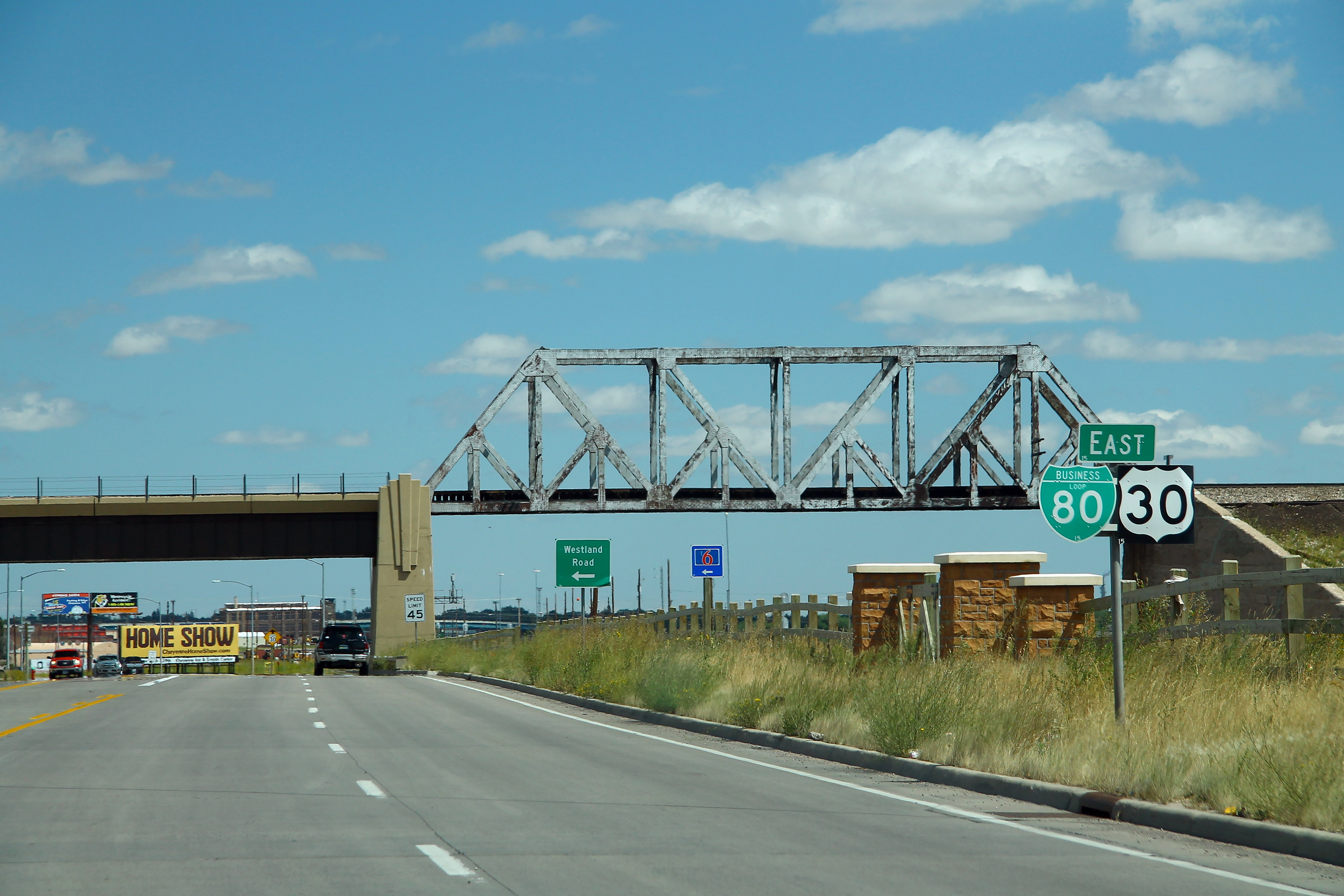
I-80 Bus./US 30 approaching a rail bridge in Cheyenne

US 30 was established in 1926 as a replacement for the former Lincoln Highway, a transcontinental route connecting San Francisco, California, to Times Square in New York City. It was named after the 16th president, Abraham Lincoln. In Wyoming, the Lincoln Highway ran through several areas US 30 currently does not run through, and many of the isolated communities US 30 formerly ran through were paths of the Lincoln Highway. The highway also ran through several more cities in Wyoming that both I-80 and US 30 were rerouted from, such as Green River, Rock Springs, and Laramie, and it mostly follows the path of the two highways' respective business routes. In addition, some of the old roads US 30 historically traveled on that it does not follow and runs concurrently with I-80 today, still run along the first generation of the Lincoln Highway. A portion of US 287, concurrent with US 30 from Rawlins to Laramie, was also part of the historic highway.

== Major intersections ==
County	Location	mi	km	Destinations	Notes
Lincoln		0.000	0.000	US 30 west – Pocatello	Continuation into Idaho
Lincoln		0.229	0.369	WYO 89 north – Afton, Jackson	West end of WYO 89 concurrency
Lincoln	Cokeville	10.713	17.241	WYO 231 west / WYO 232 east – Cokeville	
Lincoln	Sage	30.059	48.375	WYO 89 south – Evanston, Logan, Utah	East end of WYO 89 concurrency
Lincoln	Kemmerer	52.463	84.431	US 30 Byp. east – Rock Springs	
Lincoln	Kemmerer	54.510	87.725	US 189 north – Big Piney	West end of US 189 concurrency
Lincoln	Kemmerer	57.280	92.183	US 189 south – Evanston US 30 Byp. west – Port of Entry, Cokeville	East end of US 189 concurrency; US 30 Byp. exit 57
Lincoln	Opal	72.645	116.911	WYO 240 north – La Barge	
Sweetwater	Granger	96.647	155.538	WYO 375 west – Granger	
Sweetwater	Granger Junction	100.844	162.293	WYO 374 west	WYO 374 is unsigned
Sweetwater	Granger Junction	101.330	163.075	I-80 west / Lincoln Highway – Evanston	West end of I-80 concurrency; west end of Lincoln Highway concurrency; I-80 exit 66
See I-80 (exits 66-235)
Carbon	Walcott Junction	270.268	434.954	I-80 east – Laramie WYO 130 east / WYO 230 east – Saratoga	East end of I-80 concurrency; I-80 exit 235; continuation of US 287 concurrency (from I-80 exit 215)
Carbon		270.352	435.089	Eastbound road closure gate (weather depending)	
Carbon	Hanna	287.380	462.493	WYO 72 – Hanna, Elk Mountain	
Carbon	Medicine Bow	306.106	492.630	Westbound road closure gate (weather depending)	
Carbon	Medicine Bow	306.306	492.952	WYO 487 north – Casper	
Carbon	Medicine Bow	306.986	494.046	Eastbound road closure gate (weather depending)	
Albany	Rock River	313.640	504.755	WYO 13 west – McFadden, Arlington	
Albany		345.376	555.829	Westbound road closure gate (weather depending)	
Albany	Bosler	345.513	556.049	WYO 34 east – Wheatland	
Albany		355.166	571.584	Westbound road closure gate (weather depending)	
Albany	Laramie	362.038	582.644	I-80 BL west (Curtis Street) to I-80 / Reynold Street	West end of I-80 BL concurrency
Albany	Laramie	362.885	584.007	WYO 130 west / WYO 230 west (Snowy Range Road) / Harney Street – Centennial	
Albany	Laramie	363.147	584.428	US 287 south (Third Street)	East end of US 287 concurrency
Albany	Laramie	367.146	590.864	I-80 west / I-80 BL ends – Rawlins	East end of I-80 BL concurrency; west end of I-80 concurrency; I-80 exit 316
See I-80 (exits 316-358)
Laramie		409.533	659.079	I-80 east – Cheyenne I-80 BL begins / Otto Road (WYO 225 west)	East end of I-80 concurrency; no entrance to I-80 east; WYO 225 (Otto Road) is former US 30 west; west end of I-80 BL concurrency; I-80 exit 358
Laramie	Cheyenne	410.151	660.074	I-25 / US 87 to I-80 east – Fort Collins, Wheatland, Casper	I-25 exit 9
Laramie	Cheyenne	412.333– 412.398	663.586– 663.690	I-180 south / I-25 BL / US 85 (Central Avenue / Warren Avenue)	One-way couplet; I-180 northern terminus
Laramie	Cheyenne	415.268	668.309	WYO 212 (College Drive) / I-80 BL east to I-80	East end of I-80 BL concurrency
Laramie		421.317	678.044	I-80 west – Cheyenne	West end of I-80 concurrency; I-80 exit 370
See I-80 (exits 370-401)
Laramie	Pine Bluffs	452.379	728.033	I-80 east / I-80 BL begins – Sidney	East end of I-80 concurrency; west end of I-80 BL concurrency; I-80 exit 401
Laramie	Pine Bluffs	452.379	728.033	Pine Bluffs Rest Area	
Laramie	Pine Bluffs	452.441	728.133	WYO 215 north – Albin	
Laramie	Pine Bluffs	453.936	730.539	US 30 east / I-80 BL ends / Lincoln Highway – Kimball	East end of I-80 BL concurrency; continuation into Nebraska
1.000 mi = 1.609 km; 1.000 km = 0.621 mi: Concurrency terminus

== Related routes ==
- U.S. Route 30S (Idaho–Wyoming)
- U.S. Route 30 Bypass (Kemmerer–Diamondville, Wyoming)
- U.S. Route 30 Business (Green River, Wyoming)
- U.S. Route 30 Business (Rock Springs, Wyoming)
- U.S. Route 30 Business (Rawlins, Wyoming)

U.S. Route 30
Previous state: Idaho	Wyoming	Next state: Nebraska
