= U.S. Route 191 in Wyoming =

Segment of American highway

U.S. Highway 191
- US 191 highlighted in red

Route information
- Maintained by WYDOT
- Length: 289.402 mi (465.747 km)
- Existed: 1981–present

Major junctions
- South end: US 191 at the Utah state line near Dutch John, UT
- I-80 / US 30 in Rock Springs; US 189 from Daniel to Jackson; US 26 from Hoback to Moran; US 89 from Hoback to Yellowstone National Park; US 287 from Moran to Yellowstone National Park
- North end: Southern entrance of Yellowstone National Park

Location
- Country: United States
- State: Wyoming
- Counties: Sweetwater, Sublette, Teton, Park

Highway system
- United States Numbered Highway System; List; Special; Divided; Wyoming State Highway System; Interstate; US; State
← WYO 190	→ WYO 191
← WYO 185	→ US 189
← WYO 372	→ WYO 374

U.S. Route 191 (US 191) is a part of the U.S. Highway System that travels Douglas, Arizona on the Mexican border, north to Loring, Montana on the Canadian border; broken into two segments by Yellowstone National Park where unnumbered park roads serve as a connector. In the state of Wyoming, it extends approximately 289 miles (465 km) from the Utah state line near Dutch John, Utah to the southern entrance of Yellowstone National Park. The current US 191 alignment through Wyoming was established in 1981, replacing U.S. Route 187 (US 187) and Wyoming Highway 373 (WYO 373), making it relatively new compared to other U.S. Highways.

== Route description ==
US 191 enters Wyoming near a geographical feature known as Minnie's Gap, just east of Flaming Gorge National Recreation Area. The route proceeds 51 miles (82 km) north through rugged desert country following an alignment mostly constructed during the 1970s, to Interstate 80 at exit 99, just west of Rock Springs. This segment of the route is known locally as "East Flaming Gorge Road." The route is then concurrent for 5.6 miles (9.0 km) with I-80 and US 30 eastward through Rock Springs, exiting I-80 at Elk Street (exit 104). Officially, the WYDOT lists US 191 beginning at I-80 Business and US 30 Business, the location of former US 187 southern terminus; however, the section is unsigned in favor of it being concurrent I-80.

US 191 continues northward at Rock Springs, traveling through high desert country for 98 miles (158 km) through Eden and Farson to Pinedale, where it becomes concurrent with Wyoming Centennial Scenic Byway. The travels 11 miles (18 km) to Daniel where it meets US 189, beginning their 67-mile (108 km) concurrency. Continuing north, the road traverses increasingly mountainous terrain, entering the Bridger-Teton National Forest and passing through the small community of Bondurant before descending through the narrow Hoback River Canyon to an intersection with US 26 and US 89 at Hoback Junction. The four routes follow the Snake River valley northward into the Jackson Hole valley for 14 miles (23 km) to Jackson where US 189 terminates.

North of Jackson, US 191 soon enters Grand Teton National Park, running concurrently with US 26 and US 89. The highway meets US 287 at Moran Junction, inside the park; US 191, US 89, and US 287 are concurrent north of Moran, but the highways are not signed. Continuing through forested and mountainous country, the three routes travel seven miles (11 km) through the John D. Rockefeller Jr. Memorial Parkway before reaching the South Entrance of Yellowstone National Park. Officially US 191 and the other U.S. Routes are officially discontinuous through the park, though some commercially produced maps show these highways running inside Yellowstone National Park itself along its unnumbered roads. US 191 along with US 287 resume at the West Entrance at West Yellowstone, Montana.

Approximately 15 miles (24 km) north of West Yellowstone while passing through Yellowstone National Park, US 191 has a five-and-a-half-mile (8.9 km) segment running along the Gallatin River where it crosses into Park County; however, the segment is separate from the rest of the Wyoming state highway system and is maintained by the Montana Department of Transportation.

== History ==
U.S. Highway 187
- Location: Rock Springs–Moran Junction
- Length: 207 mi (333 km)
- Existed: 1926–1982

Wyoming Highway 373
- Location: Utah state line–Purple Sage
- Length: 51 mi (82 km)

US 191 originally did not exist in Wyoming except for the Gallatin River section, as its original route ran from US 91 in Idaho Falls, Idaho to Malta, Montana; US 191 was later extended southward into Utah. In the 1940s, US 20 was extended westward into Idaho and Oregon, resulting in US 20 and US 191 being cosigned between West Yellowstone and Idaho Falls. In the mid-1970s, coinciding with the completion of Interstate 15, US 191 was decommissioned south of Idaho Falls.

In the meantime, US 187 was designated as a 207-mile (333 km) highway between Rock Springs and Moran. Some early proposals had it extend south into Colorado via Baggs along present-day WYO 789; however, those went unrealized resulting in US 187 remaining an intrastate U.S. Highway.

In the late 1960s/early 1970s officials in Utah and Wyoming formed a plan have a single-numbered route between Moab and Yellowstone National Park. Initial agreements proposed using US 163 which was later signed in Utah, with initial proposals having US 163 replacing US 189 in Wyoming. In 1981 the AASHTO recommended rerouting US 191 by decommissioning the US 20 concurrency south of West Yellowstone, following US 187 from Yellowstone to Rock Springs, replacing WYO 373 to the Utah state line, and replacing a series of highways in Utah. This was formalized with US 187 and WYO 373 being decommissioned in 1982.

== Major intersections ==
County	Location	mi	km	Exit	Destinations	Notes
Sweetwater		0.000	0.000		US 191 south – Vernal	Continuation into Utah
Sweetwater	Purple Sage	51.388	82.701	99	I-80 west / US 30 west – Evanston	Southern end of I-80 / US 30 concurrency; exit numbers follow I-80
Sweetwater	Rock Springs	53.400	85.939	101	Interchange Road	
Sweetwater	Rock Springs	54.565	87.814	102	I-80 BL east / US 30 Bus. east (Dewar Drive)	
Sweetwater	Rock Springs	56.027	90.167	103	College Drive	
Sweetwater	Rock Springs	57.032	91.784	104	I-80 east / US 30 east to WYO 430 – Rawlins Elk Street (US 191 Spur south)	Southern end of I-80 / US 30 concurrency; US 191 officially follows Elk Street (US 191 Spur) but is unsigned in favor of the I-80 concurrency
Sweetwater	Farson	96.170	154.771		WYO 28 / California National Historic Trail / Mormon Pioneer National Historic Trail / Oregon National Historic Trail / Pony Express National Historic Trail – Kemmerer, Lander	
Sublette		132.456	213.167		WYO 351 west – Big Piney	
Sublette	Boulder	143.495	230.933		WYO 353 east	
Sublette	Pinedale	155.084	249.584		Fermont Lake Road (CR 154 north) / Wyoming Centennial Scenic Byway begins	Southern end of Wyoming Centennial Scenic Byway concurrency
Sublette		161.214	259.449		WYO 352 north – Cora, Bridger Wilderness Green River Entrance	
Sublette	Daniel	166.162	267.412		US 189 south – Kemmerer	Southern end of US 189 concurrency
Sublette	Daniel	166.444	267.866		WYO 354 west	
Teton	Hoback	219.141	352.673		US 26 west / US 89 south – Alpine Junction	Southern end of US 26 / US 89 concurrency
Teton	Hoback	223.091	359.030		WYO 391 east (East Evans Road)	
Teton	Jackson	230.886	371.575		WYO 22 west – Wilson, Teton Village	
Teton	Jackson	232.711	374.512		Broadway Avenue / Cache Street (US 189 ends)	Northern end of US 189 concurrency; US 189 northern terminus
Teton	Grand Teton National Park	236.659	380.866		Grand Teton National Park boundary	
Teton	Grand Teton National Park	244.632	393.697		Teton Park Road – Visitor Center	To Moose–Wilson Road
Teton	Grand Teton National Park	262.422	422.327		US 26 east / US 287 south / Wyoming Centennial Scenic Byway – Dubois	Northern end of US 26 / Wyoming Centennial Scenic Byway concurrency; southern end of US 287 concurrency
Teton	Grand Teton National Park	266.434	428.784		Moran Entrance Station	
Teton	Grand Teton National Park	282.630	454.849		Grand Teton National Park boundary	
Teton	John D. Rockefeller Jr. Memorial Parkway	No major junctions				
Teton	Yellowstone National Park	289.402	465.747		US 89 ends / US 287 ends	US 89 / US 191 / US 287 northern terminus; north end of US 89 / US 287 concurrency
Teton	Yellowstone National Park	289.402	465.747	Yellowstone National Park boundary (South Entrance)		
Teton	Yellowstone National Park	289.402	465.747		South Entrance Road (to US 89 north / US 191 north / US 287 north)	Continuation into Yellowstone National Park; US 89 resumes in Montana at the park's north entrance; US 191 / US 287 resume in Montana at the park's west entrance
Gap in route
Park	Yellowstone National Park	0.000	0.000		US 191 south – West Yellowstone	Continuation into Montana; section maintained by MDT
Park	Yellowstone National Park	No major junctions				
Park	Yellowstone National Park	5.456	8.781		US 191 north – Bozeman	Continuation into Montana
1.000 mi = 1.609 km; 1.000 km = 0.621 mi: Closed/former; Concurrency terminus; Tolled

== Rock Springs spur route ==
U.S. Highway 191 Spur
- Elk Street
- Location: Rock Springs
- Length: 1.315 mi (2.116 km)
- Existed: 1981–present

U.S. Route 191 Spur (US 191 Spur) is a 1.3-mile (2.1 km) unsigned spur route in Rock Springs. It runs along Elk Street from I-80 Business/US 30 Business to US 191 where it leaves its concurrency with I-80/US 30.

Officially, the WYDOT lists US 191 beginning at I-80 Business/US 30 Business, reflective of the former southern terminus of US 187; however, the section is unsigned in favor of it being concurrent I-80.

Major intersections

The entire route is in Rock Springs, Sweetwater County.

mi	km	Destinations	Notes
0.000	0.000	I-80 BL / US 30 Bus. (Center Street / Bridger Avenue) / Elk Street – Salt Lake, Rawlings	
1.315	2.116	I-80 / US 30 / US 191 south to WYO 430 – Rawlings, Green River US 191 north (Elk Street) – Pinedale	I-80 exit 104; continues as US 191
1.000 mi = 1.609 km; 1.000 km = 0.621 mi

== See also ==
U.S. Route 191
Previous state: Utah	Wyoming	Next state: Montana
