= Wyoming Highway 372 =

State highway in Lincoln and Sweetwater counties in Wyoming, United States

Wyoming Highway 372
- La Barge Road
- WYO 372 highlighted in red

Route information
- Maintained by WYDOT
- Length: 48.59 mi (78.20 km)
- Existed: June 1971–present
- Tourist routes: California National Historic Trail; Mormon Pioneer National Historic Trail; Oregon National Historic Trail; Pony Express National Historic Trail

Major junctions
- South end: WYO 374 west of James Town
- WYO 28 southeast of Fontenelle
- North end: US 189 west of Fontenelle

Location
- Country: United States
- State: Wyoming
- Counties: Sweetwater, Lincoln

Highway system
- Wyoming State Highway System; Interstate; US; State
← WYO 371	→ WYO 373

Wyoming Highway 372 (WYO 372), La Barge Road, is a 48.59-mile (78.20 km) state highway in Sweetwater and Lincoln counties in Wyoming, United States, that connects Wyoming Highway 374 (WYO 374), west of James Town, with U.S Route 189 (US 189), west of Fontenelle.

== Route description ==
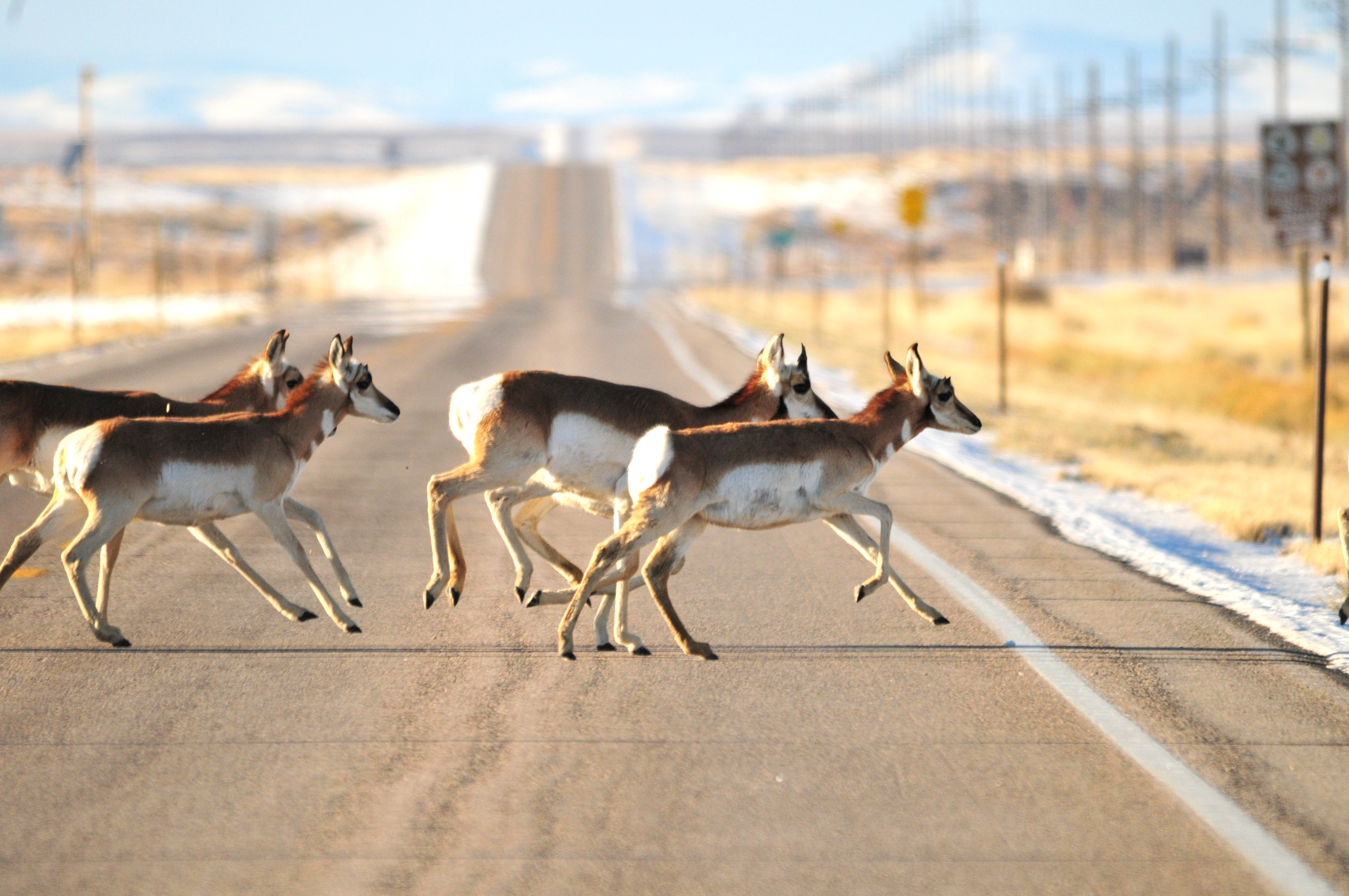
Pronghorn crossing WYO 372 in the Seedskadee National Wildlife Refuge, December 2015

WYO 372 begins at T intersection with Wyoming Highway 374 (WYO 374) in Sweetwater County, west of James Town. (WYO 374 heads west toward Little America and south, where it immediately has a diamond interchange with Interstate 80 / U.S. Route 30 [exit 83], before turning east toward James Town and Green River). From its southern terminus WYO 372 travels northwesterly, roughly paralleling the Green River, although from a considerable distance. Nearing 21 miles (34 km), WYO 374 passes through the western side of the Seedskadee National Wildlife Refuge. Shortly thereafter WYO 372 connects with the western end of Wyoming Highway 28 (WYO 28), which serves as the main route to Riverton and Lander. At the junction with WYO 28, WYO 372 joins four Auto Tour Routes, which head east on WYO 28 and west on WYO 372. (The Auto Tour routes are the California National Historic Trail, the Mormon Pioneer National Historic Trail, the Oregon National Historic Trail, and the Pony Express National Historic Trail.)

Beyond its junction with WYO 28, WYO 372 continues northeasterly for approximately 12 miles (19 km) before leaving Sweetwater County and entering Lincoln County. WYO 372 then north for a short stretch to reach the census-designated place of Fontenelle. On the southern border of Fontenelle WYO 37 intersects with County Road 316 (CR 116 / Fontenelle-North Road) and County Road 311 (CR 311 / Lincoln-Sweetwater Road). CR 116 heads north through Fontenelle toward the Fontenelle Reservoir and CR 311 heads east to cross the Green River. From that intersection WYO 372 heads southwest for about 2.4 miles (3.9 km), initially along the southern border of Fontenelle, before turning west. After roughly 5.5 miles (8.9 km), WYO 372 turns northwest and promptly arrives at its northern terminus and a T intersection with US 189. (The Auto Tour routes continued south on US 189 toward Kemmerer and Diamondville. US 189 heads north toward La Barge, Big Piney, and Jackson.

== History ==
In 1994, WYO 372 was reconstructed and widened to accommodate additional traffic due to the mining and oil exploration operations north of Green River.

== Major intersections ==
County	Location	mi	km	Destinations	Notes
Sweetwater		0.00	0.00	WYO 374 east – I‑80 / US 30, Green River, Rock Springs	Continuation south, then east from southern terminus
Sweetwater		0.00	0.00	WYO 374 west / California National Historic Trail / Oregon National Historic Trail west – Little America, Kemmerer, Evanston	Southern terminus; T intersection
Sweetwater		26.81	43.15	WYO 28 east / California National Historic Trail / Mormon Pioneer National Historic Trail / Oregon National Historic Trail / Pony Express National Historic Trail east – Farson	Western end of WYO 28; T intersection
Lincoln		48.59	78.20	US 189 north – La Barge, Big Piney, Jackson US 189 south / California National Historic Trail / Mormon Pioneer National Historic Trail / Oregon National Historic Trail / Pony Express National Historic Trail west – Kemmerer, Diamondville	Northern terminus; T intersection
1.000 mi = 1.609 km; 1.000 km = 0.621 mi

== See also ==
- List of state highways in Wyoming
