= Wyoming Highway 28 =

State highway in Sweetwater, Sublette, and Fremont counties in Wyoming, United States

Wyoming Highway 28
- South Pass Highway
- WYO 28 highlighted in red

Route information
- Maintained by WYDOT
- Length: 96.416 mi (155.167 km)
- History: 1986: Extended south from US 191 to WYO 372

Major junctions
- West end: WYO 372 southeast of Fontenelle
- US 191 in Farson
- East end: US 287 / WYO 789 south-southeast of Lander

Location
- Country: United States
- State: Wyoming
- Counties: Sweetwater, Sublette, Fremont

Highway system
- Wyoming State Highway System; Interstate; US; State
← WYO 26	→ US 30

Wyoming Highway 28 (WYO 28), also known as the South Pass Highway, is a 96.46-mile (155.24 km) state highway in Sweetwater, Sublette, and Fremont counties in Wyoming, United States, that connects Wyoming Highway 372 (WYO 372), southeast of Fontenelle, with U.S. Route 287 / Wyoming Highway 789 (US 287 / WYO 789), south-southeast of Lander.

== Route description ==
=== Sweetwater County ===
WYO 28 begins at a T intersection with WYO 372 (La Barge Road) in Sweetwater County, just north of a western arm of the Seedskadee National Wildlife Refuge (Seedskadee NWR) and roughly 14 miles (23 km) southeast of the census-designated place (CDP) of Fontenelle. (WYO 372 heads north toward Kemmerer and La Barge and south through the arm of the Seedskade NWR and then on toward Green River and Rock Springs.)

From its western terminus WYO 28 proceeds northeasterly as a two lane road for its entire length. After approximately 2.8 miles (4.5 km), WYO 28 enters the Seedskadee NWR, crosses the Green River, and then leaves the Seedskadee NWR. At about 28.82 miles (46.38 km) along its route, and just after crossing the Big Sandy River, WY0 28 has its junction with U.S. Route 191 (US 191) on the southern border of the CDP of Farson in Eden Valley. (US 191 heads north toward Pinedale and Jackson and south toward Eden and Rock Springs.)

East of its junction with US 191, WYO 28 very briefly passes through the southern edge of Farson before continuing roughly 2.4 miles (3.9 km) along the southern border of the CDP, with the meanders of Little Sandy Creek to the south. As WYO 28 crosses the Little Sandy Creek, it leaves Farson CR 108 and continues for about 14.5 miles (23.3 km) before leaving Sweetwater County.

=== Sublette County ===
Upon leaving Sweetwater County, WWO 28 enters Sublette County. With the exception of a single paved turnoff, there are only a few unnamed dirt side roads along the 3.75 miles (6.04 km) section of WYO 28 that are within Sublette County. The nearly 1,900-foot (580 m) turnoff includes a historical marker and gravestone. Upon leaving Sublette County, WYO 28 enters Fremont County.

=== Fremont County ===
After 5 miles (8.0 km), it spurs north to Farson Little Sandy Road, leading to Big Sandy. It continues northeast out of Sweetwater County, cuts through a small corner of Sublette County and enters Fremont County. It crosses the Continental Divide at South Pass, one of the lowest passes on the continental divide, at 7,550 feet (2,300 m). South Pass was used by settlers on the Oregon Trail. From there, there are spurs to the south leading to the South Pass Historic Site and Atlantic City. From there it curves north, travelling about 17 miles (27 km) until its merge with US 287, near Lander.

== History ==
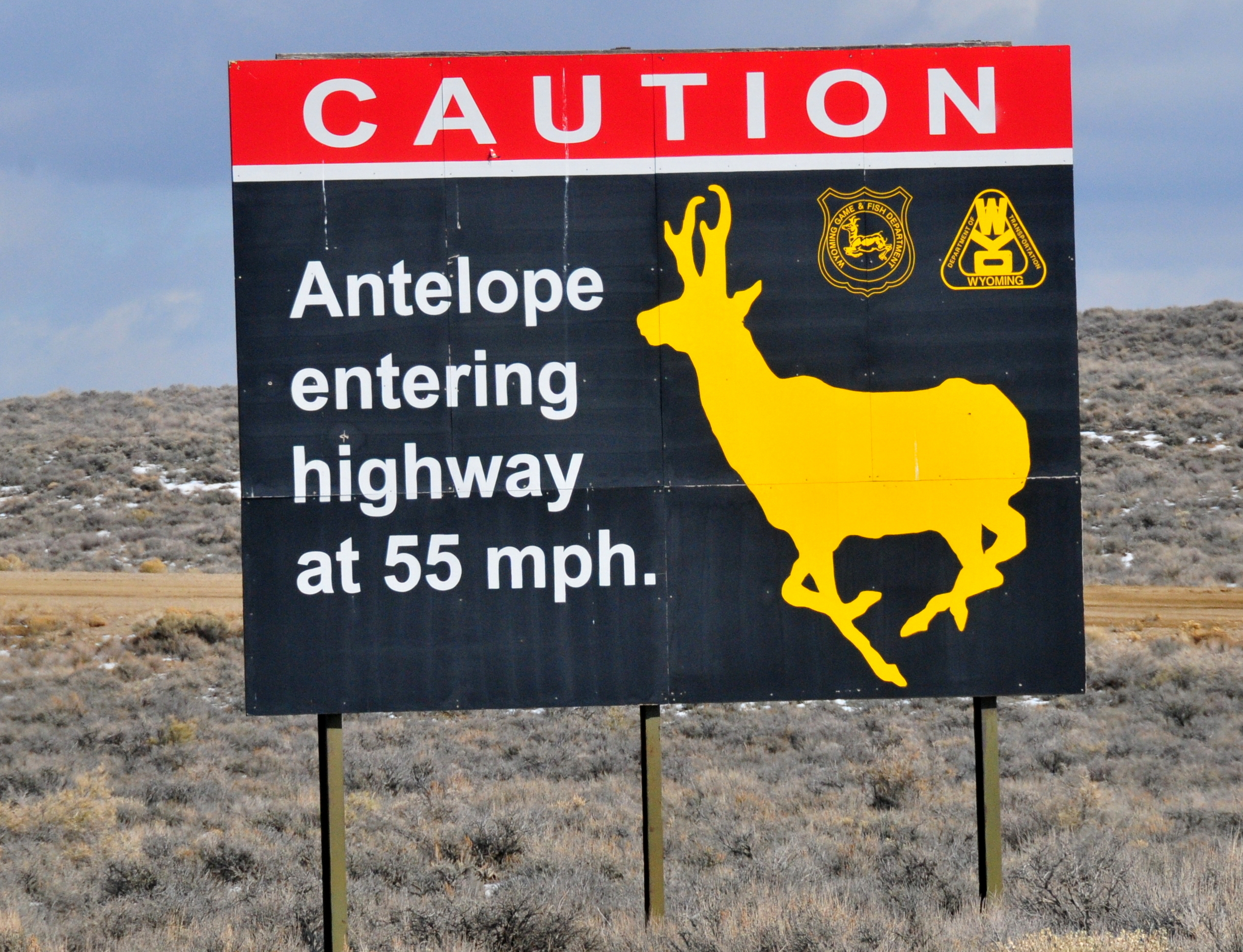
Wildlife warning signs on WYO 28 between the Seedskadee National Wildlife Refuge and Farson, October 2013

WYO 28 generally follows the route followed by settlers on the Oregon Trail. A section of the highway 17 miles (27 km) due south of Lander and just north of the unincorporated community of Atlantic City was realigned around a new U.S. Steel mine in 1962. (The mine was known as the Columbia-Geneva Mines.) The realignment created sharp and narrow turns. Although the mine closed in 1983, the section was not removed until the original alignment was restored in 2005.

The western end of WYO 28 was originally at the former U.S. Route 287 (now US 191) in Farson, but was extended southwest to the Fontenelle area in 1986 in response to increased soda ash shipments by truck, which required a paved road. The project was led by the Federal Highway Administration, which was granted the necessary right-of-way by the Bureau of Land Management (BLM); the agreement between the two federal agencies required that any future wildlife fence on the corridor be approved by the BLM. A 15-mile (24 km) was proposed in 1991 to redirect herds of Sublette antelopes as well as livestock which had caused vehicular accidents since the extension opened. The BLM initially approved a plan with the Wyoming Department of Transportation (WYDOT) to fence the corridor, but WYDOT later retracted the plan following public opposition and pushback from the Wyoming Department of Game and Fish. A series of eight warning signs was installed as an alternative to the fencing plan.

== Major intersections ==
Actual mileposts begin at 100 at WYO 372 and increase heading northeast to Farson, where they reset to 0 and increase continuing northeast toward Lander.

County	Location	mi	km	Destinations	Notes
Sweetwater		0.000	0.000	WYO 372 north (La Barge Rd) / California National Historic Trail / Mormon Pioneer National Historic Trail / Oregon National Historic Trail / Pony Express National Historic Trail north – Kemmerer, La Barge WYO 372 south (La Barge Rd) / California National Historic Trail / Mormon Pioneer National Historic Trail / Oregon National Historic Trail / Pony Express National Historic Trail south – Seedskade NWR, Green River, Rock Springs	Western terminus; T intersection
Sweetwater		2.805	4.514	Bridge over the Green River	
Sweetwater				CR 8 west (Lower Farson Cutoff Rd) – Fontenelle	T intersection
Sweetwater				CR 8 east (Lower Farson Cutoff Rd) – WYO 28	T intersection
Sweetwater				CR 8 west (Lower Farson Cutoff Rd) – WYO 28	T intersection
Sweetwater				CR 8 east (Lower Farson Cutoff Rd) – Farson	T intersection
Sweetwater		28.970	46.623	Bridge over the Big Sandy River	
Sweetwater	Farson	28.217	45.411	US 191 north – Pinedale, Jackson US 191 south – Eden, Rock Springs	Former southern terminus (pre-1986)
Sweetwater	Farson			CR 109 north (Farson Station Rd) – CR 100	T intersection
Sweetwater	Farson			CR 105 north (Farson 1st East Rd) – CR 100, CR 101, CR 102	T intersection
Sweetwater	Farson			CR 106 north (Farson 2nd East Rd) – 101, CR 102, CR 103, CR 104, CR 108	T intersection
Sweetwater	Farson	31.448	50.611	Bridge over Little Sandy Creek	
Sweetwater		32.617	52.492	CR 108 north (Farson 4th East Rd / Farson Little Sandy Rd / Eden Reservor Rd) – Farson, CR 106, WYO 353	T intersection
Sweetwater				CR 102 west (Farson 3rd North Rd) – CR 108, CR 107, CR 106, CR 105	T intersection
Sweetwater		34.384	55.336	Bridge over Eden Canal	
Sweetwater				CR 21 east (Bar X Rd) – CR 83, CR 74, CR 15, CR 20, CR 82, I-80	T intersection
Sublette	No major junctions				
Fremont				Continental Divide at South Pass (elevation 7,550 feet [2,300 m])	
Fremont				CR 446 north (Lander Cutoff Rd) – Boulder CR 445 south (Oregon Buttes Rd) – Sweetwater County CR 74	
Fremont		62.322	100.298	Bridge over the Sweetwater River	
Fremont		62.527	100.627	Sweetwater Rest Area	
Fremont		66.317	106.727	Unnamed dirt road north CR 479 east (South Pass Rd) – South Pass City, WYO 28	
Fremont				FR 313 north – FR 300 CR 479 west (South Pass Rd) – South Pass City, WYO 28	
Fremont				FR 300 north – FR 313, WYO 131, Lander	T intersection
Fremont		72.917	117.349	CR 315 east (West Atlantic City Rd / Winter Rd)	T intersection
Fremont		75.137	120.921	Skyline Rd north Dickinson Ave / WYO 28 Loop east – WYDOT maintenance facility & CR 237, Atlantic City, WYO 28	Dickinson Ave is former routing of WYO 28
Fremont		75.137	120.921	Dickinson Ave / WYO 28 Loop west – WYDOT maintenance facility & CR 237, Atlantic City, WYO 28	T intersection Dickinson Ave is former routing of WYO 28
Fremont		80.316	129.256	Bridge over the Beaver Creek	
Fremont		87.717	141.167	CR 235 north (Red Canyon Rd) – WYO 28	T intersection
Fremont		95.434	153.586	Bridge over the Little Popo Agie River	
Fremont		95.887	154.315	CR 235 south (Red Canyon Rd) – WYO 28	T intersection
Fremont		96.416	155.167	US 287 north / WYO 789 north / California National Historic Trail / Mormon Pioneer National Historic Trail / Oregon National Historic Trail / Pony Express National Historic Trail – Muddy Gap, Rawlins; Calvert Ln west	Eastern terminus; southbound US 287 / WYO 789 heads east from the intersection
Fremont		96.416	155.167	US 287 south / WYO 789 south / California National Historic Trail / Mormon Pioneer National Historic Trail / Oregon National Historic Trail / Pony Express National Historic Trail – Lander, Yellowstone National Park	Continuation north from eastern terminus
Fremont	1.000 mi = 1.609 km; 1.000 km = 0.621 mi				

== See also ==
- List of state highways in Wyoming
