= Wyoming Highway 240 =

State highway in Wyoming, United States

Wyoming Highway 240
- Opal Road
- WYO 240 highlighted in red

Route information
- Maintained by WYDOT
- Length: 12.28 mi (19.76 km)

Major junctions
- South end: US 30 in Opal
- North end: US 189

Location
- Country: United States
- State: Wyoming
- Counties: Lincoln

Highway system
- Wyoming State Highway System; Interstate; US; State
← WYO 239	→ WYO 241

Wyoming Highway 240 (WYO 240) is a 12.28-mile-long (19.76 km) state road that in Lincoln County, Wyoming that connects U.S. Route 30 (US 30) and US 189 in the southeastern end of the county.

== Route description ==
Wyoming Highway 240 is a north–south highway that runs from US 30 in Opal north 12.28 miles (19.76 km) to a north end at US 189 located approximately 21 miles (34 km) northeast of Kemmerer. WYO 240 Acts as a bypass for travelers connecting from US 30 west to US 189 north.

== Major intersections ==
The entire route is in Lincoln County.

Location	mi	km	Destinations	Notes
Opal	0.00	0.00	US 30	Southern Terminus of WYO 240
	12.28	19.76	US 189	Northern Terminus of WYO 240
1.000 mi = 1.609 km; 1.000 km = 0.621 mi
