= Wyoming Highway 352 =

State highway in Wyoming, United States

Wyoming Highway 352
- WYO 352 highlighted in red

Route information
- Maintained by WYDOT
- Length: 25.31 mi (40.73 km)

Major junctions
- South end: US 191
- North end: Forest Service Road 10091 at Bridger National Forest

Location
- Country: United States
- State: Wyoming
- Counties: Sublette

Highway system
- Wyoming State Highway System; Interstate; US; State
← WYO 351	→ WYO 353

Wyoming Highway 352 (WYO 352) is a 25.31-mile-long (40.73 km) north-south Wyoming state road located in northern Sublette County. Highway 352 provides access Cora and Bridger National Forest.

== Route description ==
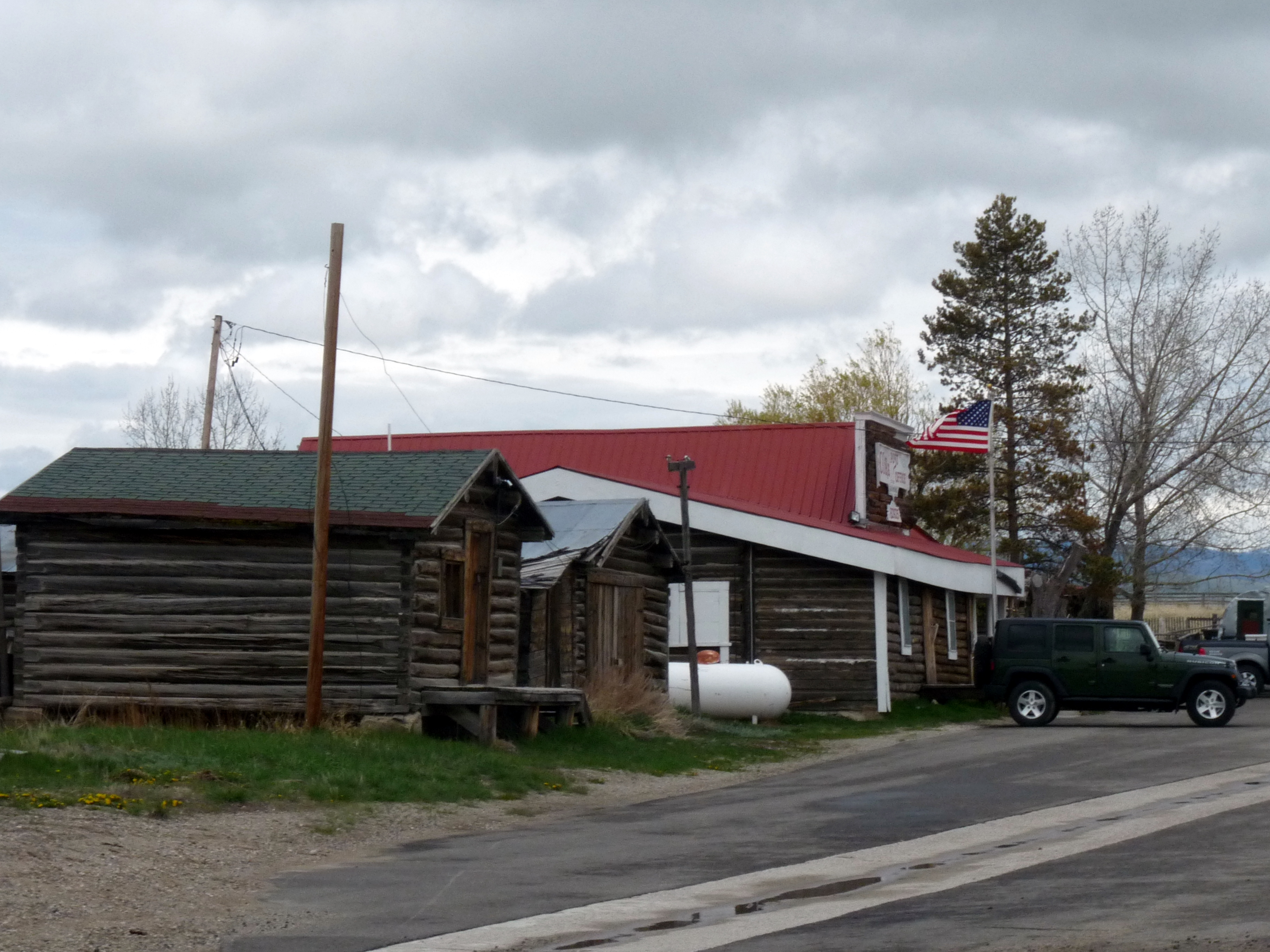
Cora, just off Highway 352

Wyoming Highway 352 begins its southern end at U.S. Route 191, 5 miles west of Pinedale. Highway 352 travels north, reaching the community (CDP) of Cora at just over 4 miles. Past Cora, WYO 352 begins to parallel the New Fork River, and will do so for approximately 7 miles. Just north of Cora, Forty Rod Road (CR 149) is intersected at 7.79 miles (12.5 km). CR 149 travels west to US 189/US 191. WYO 352 continues northward as the New Fork River leaves east to the New Fork Lakes, meanwhile the Green River closes in from the west and will be paralleled to the northern terminus. Highway 352 reaches its northern terminus at the entrance Bridger National Forest at 25.31 miles. The roadway continues as Forest Service Road 10091.

== Major intersections ==
The entire route is in Sublette County.

Location	mi	km	Destinations	Notes
	0.00	0.00	US 191	
	7.79	12.54	CR 149 (Forty Rod Road)	West to U.S. Route 189/U.S. Route 191
	25.31	40.73	Forest Service Road 10091	Continuation beyond northern terminus
1.000 mi = 1.609 km; 1.000 km = 0.621 mi
