= Wyoming Highway 351 =

State highway in Wyoming, United States

Wyoming Highway 351
- WYO 351 highlighted in red

Route information
- Maintained by WYDOT
- Length: 24.18 mi (38.91 km)

Major junctions
- West end: US 189 near Marbleton
- East end: US 191

Location
- Country: United States
- State: Wyoming
- Counties: Sublette

Highway system
- Wyoming State Highway System; Interstate; US; State
← WYO 350	→ WYO 352

Wyoming Highway 351 (WYO 351) is a 24.18-mile-long (38.91 km) east-west Wyoming state road located in central Sublette County. It connects U.S. Route 189 (US 189) with US 191 and mainly serves the Big Piney-Rock Springs corridor.

== Route description ==
Wyoming Highway 351 begins at its western end at U.S. Route 189 east of the Big Piney-Marbleton Airport, 2 miles north of Marbleton and 3 miles north of Big Piney. Highway 351 travels east and crosses the Green River at 7.30 miles (11.7 km) and shortly after intersects Sublette CR 110 and 175. Now WYO 351 runs along the north side of the New Fork River, a tributary of the Green River, and parallels it for a few miles before crossing it at approximately 12.90 miles (20.8 km). WYO 351 reaches its eastern terminus at US 191 at just over 24 miles, 11 miles south of Boulder.

== Major intersections ==
The entire route is in Sublette County.

Location	mi	km	Destinations	Notes
	0.00	0.00	US 189	
	24.18	38.91	US 191	
1.000 mi = 1.609 km; 1.000 km = 0.621 mi
