= Wyoming Highway 391 =

Highway in Wyoming, United States

Wyoming Highway 391
- Evans Road
- WYO 391 highlighted in red

Route information
- Maintained by WYDOT
- Length: 0.30 mi (480 m)

Major junctions
- East end: US 26 / US 89 / US 191 / US 189
- West end: WYDOT Maintenance Shop

Location
- Country: United States
- State: Wyoming
- Counties: Teton

Highway system
- Wyoming State Highway System; Interstate; US; State
← WYO 390	→ WYO 410

Wyoming Highway 391 (WYO 391) is a 0.30-mile (0.48 km) Wyoming State Road for the Wyoming Department of Transportation (WYDOT) Maintenance Shop for the Jackson Area.

== Route description ==
Wyoming Highway 391 travels from US 26/US 89/US 189/US 191 west to the Jackson Area WYDOT Maintenance Shop where it ends. The roadway continues past the maintenance shop as Evans Road.

== See also ==
- Wyoming Highway 224 – State highway in Wyoming, United States
