= Wyoming Highway 375 =

State highway in Granger, Wyoming, United States

Wyoming Highway 375
- Granger Road
- WYO 375 highlighted in red

Route information
- Maintained by Wyoming Department of Transportation
- Length: 0.99 mi (1,590 m)

Major junctions
- West end: 3rd Street in Granger
- East end: US 30 in Granger

Location
- Country: United States
- State: Wyoming
- Counties: Sweetwater

Highway system
- Wyoming State Highway System; Interstate; US; State
← WYO 374	→ WYO 376

Wyoming Highway 375 (WYO 375), also known as Granger Road, is a short 0.99-mile (1.59 km) state highway in Granger, Wyoming, United States, that connects the main part of town with U.S. Route 30 (US 30).

== Route description ==
WYO 375 begins at an intersection with Walter Banks Drive, 3rd Street, and Pine Street, near the northeast edge of the main part of town. (Walter Banks Drive heads very briefly southeast before turning southwest for several blocks to end at Sweetwater County Road 16, near the north bank of Blacks Fork and southeast of the Granger Stage Station State Historic Site. Pine Street heads northwest for several blocks, passing by the post office, before ending 1st Street, just short of the several sets of tracks of the Union Pacific Railroad. 3rd Street heads southwest for one block to end at Cedar Street.) From its western terminus, WYO 375 heads northeast for its length as a two-lane road (running between the Union Pacific tracks and Blacks Fork) until it reaches its eastern terminus at a T intersection with US 30 in the northeastern part of Granger. (US 30 heads west toward Kemmerer and east toward Interstate 80 and Green River.)

== Major intersections ==
The entire route is in Granger, Sweetwater County.

mi	km	Destinations	Notes
0.00	0.00	3rd Street southwest	Continuation southwest from western terminus
0.00	0.00	Pine Street northwest Walter Banks Drive southeast	Western terminus
0.95	1.53	US 30 east – I-80, Green River US 30 west – Kemmerer	Eastern terminus
1.000 mi = 1.609 km; 1.000 km = 0.621 mi

== See also ==
- List of state highways in Wyoming
