= Wyoming Highway 76 =

State highway in Wyoming, United States

Wyoming Highway 76
- WYO 76 highlighted in red

Route information
- Maintained by WYDOT
- Length: 6.54 mi (10.53 km)

Major junctions
- West end: I-80 / US 30 / US 287 / I-80 BL / US 30 Bus. in Rawlins
- East end: I-80 / US 30 / US 287 in Sinclair

Location
- Country: United States
- State: Wyoming
- Counties: Carbon

Highway system
- Wyoming State Highway System; Interstate; US; State
← WYO 74	→ WYO 77

Wyoming Highway 76 (WYO 76) is a state highway in Carbon County, Wyoming, United States, that connects the settlements of Rawlins to Sinclair. It follows the former route of U.S. Route 30 (US 30) and parallels Interstate 80 (I-80), the main east–west freeway in the state. The highway was designated in the 1960s after the freeway was completed and transferred to local control, but later reverted to state maintenance.

== Route description ==
The western end of WYO 76 is at an interchange with I-80 in the eastern outskirts of Rawlins; the highway is a continuation of East Cedar Street, which carries US 287, I-80 Business, and US 30 Business into Rawlins. The highway travels east from Rawlins alongside I-80, a major freeway which also carries US 30 and US 287, to the north and the Union Pacific Railroad's Laramie Subdivision to the south. WYO 76 crosses under the freeway as it enters Sinclair and turns north for a block on South 9th Street and east onto Lincoln Avenue. The highway passes through the town and the Parco Historic District, which includes several historic buildings in the Spanish Colonial Revival style. WYO 76 then leaves the town and its namesake oil refinery and turns southeast to cross over the railroad and reach its east end, an interchange with I-80, US 30, and US 287.

== History ==
In 1938, Highway 76 started out as the designation for Battle Mountain Road, which is the present-day routing of Highway 70 between Baggs and Riverside. At that time, the Highway 70 designation was applied to the current routing of Highway from Walcott Junction south into Saratoga, then south through Riverside into Colorado, then northeast into Laramie via Woods Landing.

The modern-day route of Highway 76 is the former alignment of US 30 / US 287 prior to the construction of I-80. The old highway was initially transferred to Carbon County, who approved an ordinance to return it to local landowners in 1968; the formal relinquishment was never filed, so it remained under county ownership despite being a state highway. In August 1985, the town of Sinclair voted 58–19 in favor of rerouting Highway 76 off South 8th Street and onto South 9th Street.

== Major intersections ==
The entire route is in Carbon County.

Location	mi	km	Destinations	Notes
Rawlins	0.00	0.00	I-80 BL west / US 30 Bus. west	Continuation beyond I-80; eastern terminus of I-80 Bus. and US 30 Bus.
Rawlins	0.00	0.00	I-80 / US 30 / US 287 – Laramie, Rock Springs	Western terminus; I-80 exit 215
Sinclair	4.20	6.76	Lincoln Avenue to I-80 / US 30 / US 287	
Sinclair	6.54	10.53	I-80 / US 30 / US 287 – Laramie, Rock Springs	Eastern terminus; I-80 exit 221
1.000 mi = 1.609 km; 1.000 km = 0.621 mi
