= U.S. Route 189 =

Highway in the United States

U.S. Route 189
- US 189 highlighted in red

Route information
- Auxiliary route of US 89
- Length: 322 mi (518 km)
- Existed: 1939–present

Major junctions
- South end: I-15 in Provo, UT
- US 89 in Provo, UT; US 40 in Heber City, UT; I-80 near Park City, UT; I-84 in Echo, UT; I-80 near Evanston, WY; US 30 in Kemmerer, WY; US 191 near Daniel, WY; US 26 / US 89 in Hoback, WY
- North end: US 26 / US 89 / US 191 at Jackson, WY

Location
- Country: United States
- States: Utah, Wyoming
- Counties: UT: Utah, Wasatch, Summit; WY: Uinta, Lincoln, Sublette, Teton

Highway system
- United States Numbered Highway System; List; Special; Divided

U.S. Route 189 is a spur of U.S. Route 89. It currently runs for 322 miles (518 km) from Provo, Utah at Interstate 15 to Jackson, Wyoming. The highway was not part of the original 1926 U.S. Highway system. The highway was created in the 1930s, absorbing former U.S. Route 530 and a portion of U.S. Route 30S. The portion through Provo Canyon (between Provo and Heber City, Utah) has been designated the Provo Canyon Scenic Byway by the state of Utah.

== Route description ==
=== Utah ===
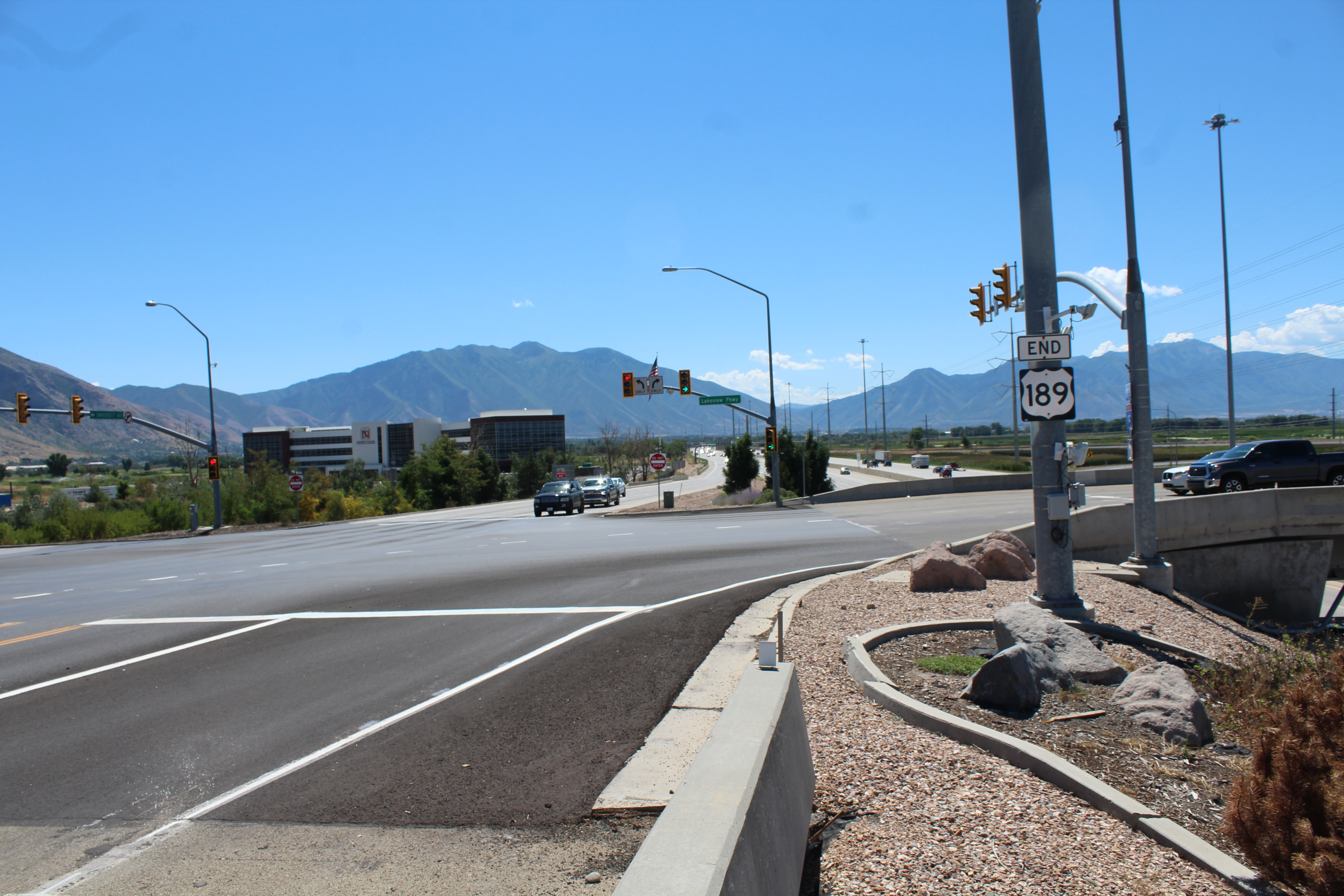
Southern terminus in Provo, UT

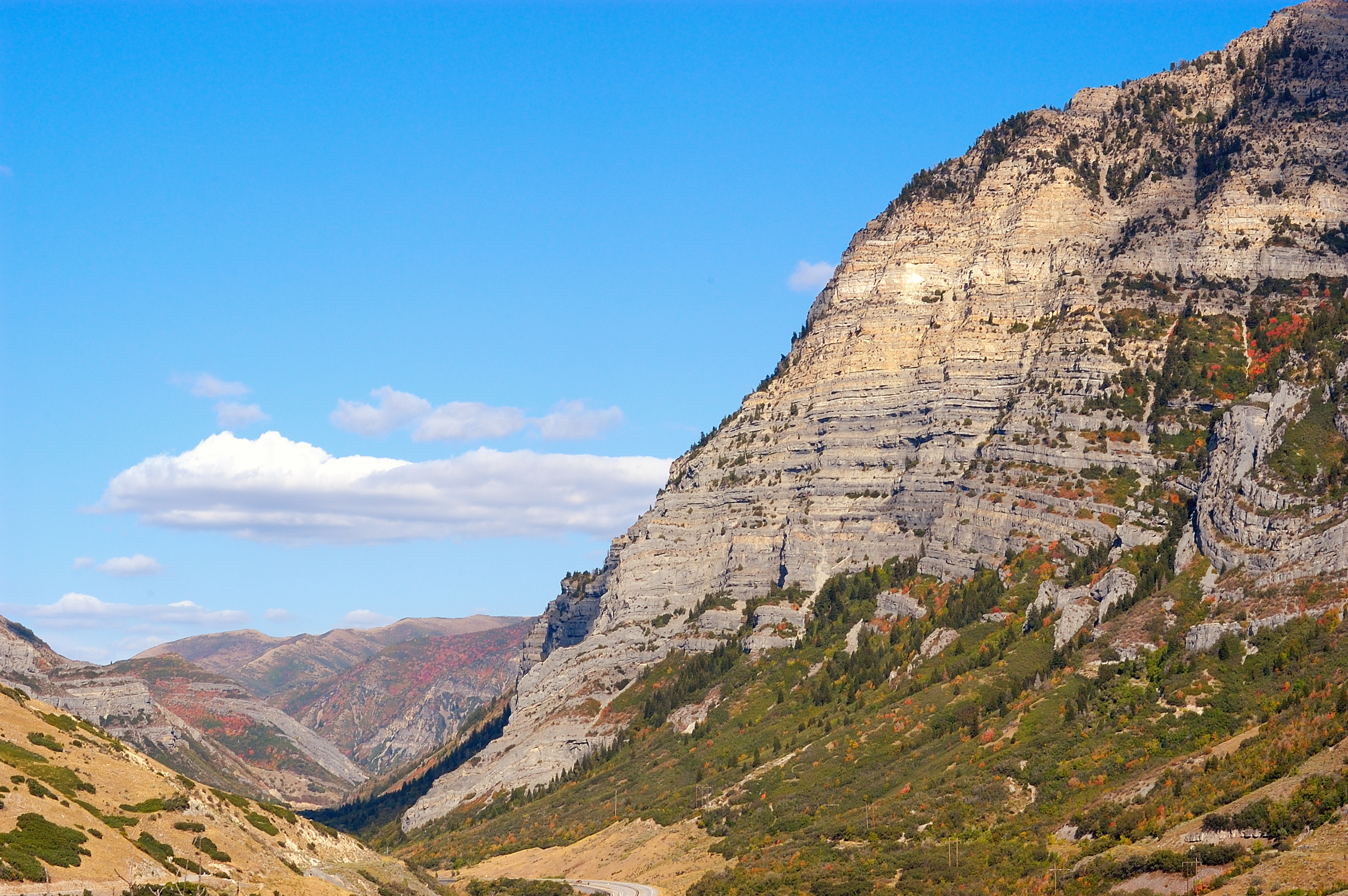
Provo Canyon, US-189 is visible in the bottom of the photo

US-189 begins in Provo where it is known as University Avenue, referring to Brigham Young University. The highway then winds up Provo Canyon passing by Deer Creek Reservoir and paralleling the route of the Heber Creeper (now known as the Heber Valley Railroad). The portion in Provo Canyon is designated the Provo Canyon Scenic Byway by the state legislature. The highway exits Provo Canyon near Heber City, Utah.

At Heber City US-189 meets U.S. Route 40 and is co-signed with Route 40 all the way to its junction with I-80.

Prior to the construction of the Jordanelle Reservoir, the highway continued north concurrent with the former alignment of US-40 that is now under water. US-40 and 189 separated at Hailstone, also now under the lake. US-189 emerged from the lake shore along the route now signed State Route 32. SR-32 and former US-189 join I-80 in Wanship. Prior to the completion of Interstate 80 in eastern Utah US-189 formed the main streets of Coalville and other communities now bypassed by I-80.

The Utah section of US-189 is defined in Utah Code Annotated § 72-4-124(2). The Utah Code does not contain the concurrent alignment along US-40 and I-80, but the concurrent portion is included in Utah Department of Transportation maps of the area.

=== Wyoming ===
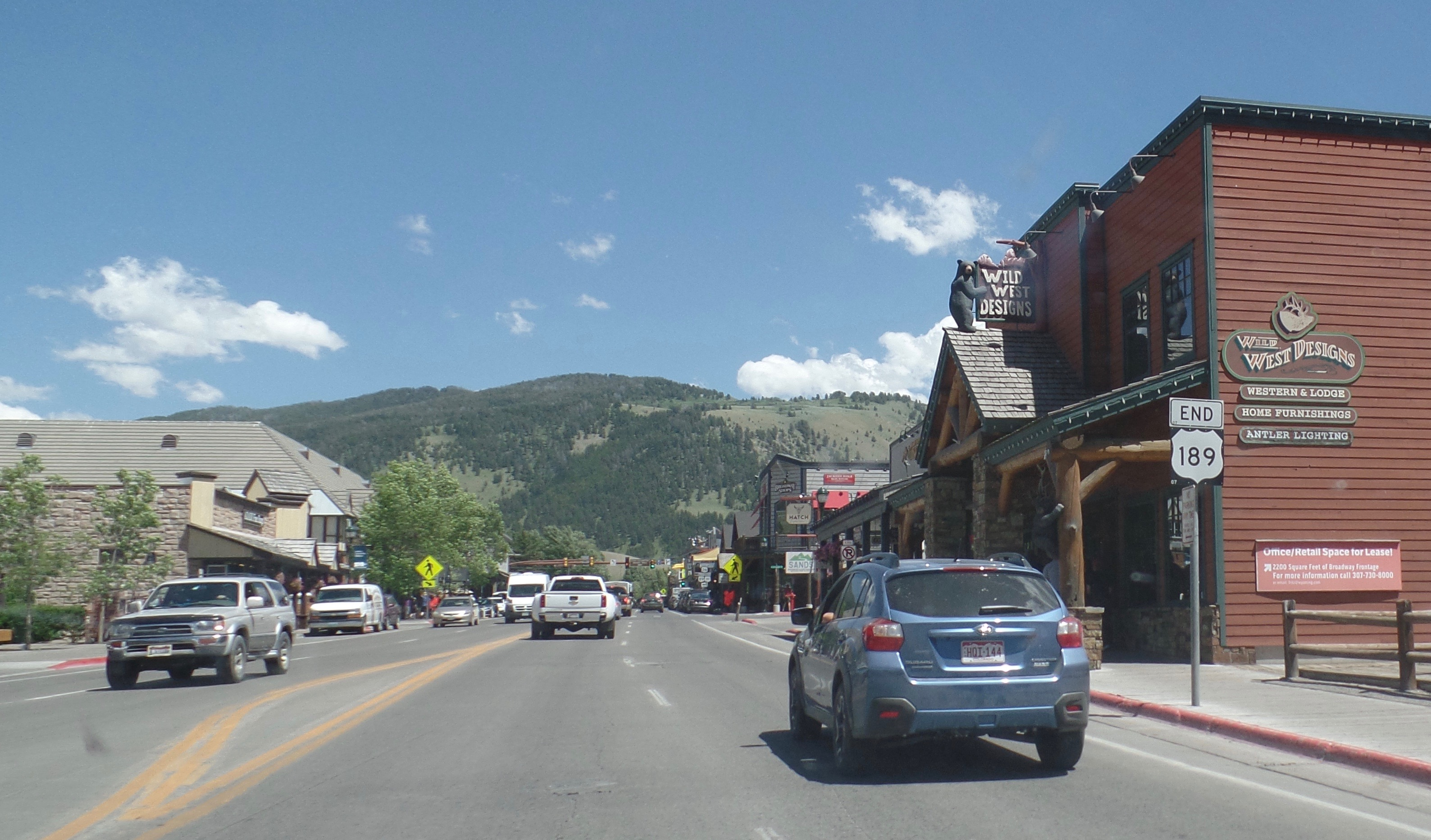
Northern terminus in Jackson, WY

US 189 enters Wyoming from the west co-routed with Interstate 80. The routes separate east of Evanston, at exit 18, where US 189 proceeds north through the town of Kemmerer, home of the JC Penney Mother Store which is located along the route. US 189 continues north, eventually following the western shore of Fontenelle Reservoir and passing Names Hill before entering La Barge, passing what is left of the Moondance Diner, which was moved to the town from New York City in 2007, and is famous from many movies and television shows. The route then continues north along the Green River towards the neighboring towns of Big Piney and Marbleton. This area is heavily developed by the Oil and Natural Gas industries. The route then cuts across the northern part of the Green River Basin through the town of Daniel and intersects with US 191 at Daniel Junction and runs concurrently to the north. Continuing north, the road traverses increasingly mountainous terrain, entering the Bridger-Teton National Forest and passing through the small community of Bondurant before descending through the narrow Hoback River Canyon to an intersection with US 26 and rejoining its parents route, US 89 at Hoback Junction.

== History ==
U.S. Route 530
- Location: Silver Creek Junction–Echo
- Existed: 1926–1939

There was a US-189 in the initial 1926 plan for U.S. Highways, which ran from Nephi to Pigeon Hollow Junction. This route is currently the eastern half of State Route 132.

In 1938, a second iteration of US 189 was created using several state routes. The portion from Provo to Heber City in Utah was numbered State Route 7. Although signed US-189 starting in 1938 this road retained the SR-7 designation until 1977.

US-189 replaced US-530, designated in 1926, between the modern junctions of I-80 with US-40 at Silver Creek Junction and I-84 at Echo. Between Echo and Evanston, Wyoming US-189 was originally concurrent with US-30S. As portions of I-80 were complete, US-189 was moved from the old US-30S alignment to the freeway alignment.

Prior to the construction of the Jordanelle Reservoir, the US-189 designation alternated between two routes between Hailstone and Wanship. For most of this era, US-189 was routed along what is now State Route 32 via Kamas. However, there are some years the official Utah Highway Map shows the road through Kamas designated as US-189 Alternate, with the main route of US-189 concurrent with the routes of US-40 and what is now I-80.

In 1985 the Utah Department of Transportation (UDOT) began plans to relocate US-40 and US-189 to prepare for the construction of the Jordanelle Reservoir. As late as 1989, UDOT still intended move US-189 to an alignment on the northern shore of the proposed reservoir. On January 18, 1990 the Federal Highway Administration sent a letter to UDOT recommending that US-189 not be moved to this new alignment. The stated reason was this new routing would result in traveling 15 miles (24 km) "out-of-direction". AASHTO agreed, and authorized a change of plan for the route of US-189 to run concurrent with US-40. UDOT agreed, and this new road was instead signed as extension of State Route 248. The portion of the former route of US-189 not submerged by the new lake was designated State Route 32 after months of negotiations with county officials.

However, although US-189 was now officially concurrent with US-40 between Heber City and Silver Creek Junction, this segment was signed only as US-40, and an "END US-189" sign was posted in Heber City. This lasted until late 2017, when the end signs were removed and US-189 signs were added to the US-40 concurrency. US-189 remains unsigned on the I-80 concurrency between Silver Creek Junction and the Wyoming state line.

== Major intersections ==
State	County	Location	mi	km	Exit	Destinations	Notes
Utah	Utah	Provo	0.000	0.000		I-15 / Lakeview Parkway / University Avenue to 1860 South – Salt Lake City, Las Vegas	US 189 southern terminus; I-15 exit 263
Utah	Utah	Provo	1.633	2.628		US 89 (300 South) – Springville, Orem	
Utah	Utah	Provo	3.434	5.526		SR-265 west / University Parkway – Brigham Young University	
Utah	Utah	Provo–Orem line	7.425	11.949		SR-52 west (Canyon Parkway) to I-15 – Orem	Partial interchange
Utah	Utah		10.657	17.151		View area	Nunns View; southbound exit and entrance only
Utah	Utah		14.300	23.014		SR-92 north (Alpine Loop Scenic Byway) – Sundance	
Utah	Wasatch		19.423	31.258		SR-314 north – Deer Creek Reservoir	
Utah	Wasatch		24.887	40.052		SR-113 north – Charleston, Midway	
Utah	Wasatch	Heber City	28.890	46.494		US 40 east – Duchesne, Vernal	Southern end of US 40 overlap
Utah	Wasatch	Heber City	29.829	48.005		SR-113 (100 South)	
Utah	Summit		33.587	54.053		SR-32 north – Francis, Kamas	Former US 189 north
Utah	Summit		33.802	54.399	South end of freeway		
Utah	Summit		38.589	62.103	8	Mayflower (SR-319)	Exit numbers follow US 40
Utah	Summit		42.837	68.939	4	SR-248 – Park City, Kamas	Exit numbers follow US 40
Utah	Summit		45.526	73.267	2	Silver Summit	Exit numbers follow US 40
Utah	Summit	Silver Creek Junction	46.835	75.374	1 146	I-80 west / US 40 ends / Silver Creek Road – Salt Lake City	Through traffic exits to I-80 west; US 40 western terminus; western end of I-80 overlap; exit numbers follow I-80
Utah	Summit		50.683	81.566	150	Tollgate Promontory	
Utah	Summit	Wanship	54.931	88.403	155	SR-32 south – Wanship, Kamas	SR-32 is former route of US-189
Utah	Summit	Coalville	62.551	100.666	162	Coalville (SR-280)	
Utah	Summit	Echo Junction	67.283	108.281	168	I-84 west – Ogden	Exits 120A-B on I-84
Utah	Summit		67.640	108.856	169	Echo	
Utah	Summit		78.662	126.594	178	Emory	Westbound exit and eastbound entrance
Utah	Summit		84.085	135.322	185	Castle Rock	
Utah	Summit		87.726	141.181	187	Ranch Exit	
Utah	Summit		91.649	147.495	191	Wahsatch	
			96.639 0.000	155.525 0.000	Utah–Wyoming line		
Wyoming	Uinta	Evanston	3.453	5.557	3	I-80 BL east / US 189 Bus. north (Harrison Drive) to WYO 89	
Wyoming	Uinta	Evanston	5.263	8.470	5	WYO 89 north (Front Street) / WYO 150 south	
Wyoming	Uinta	Evanston	6.257	10.070	6	I-80 BL west / US 189 Bus. south (Bear River Drive) to WYO 89	
Wyoming	Uinta		18.293	29.440	18	I-80 east – Lyman	North end of I-80 overlap
Wyoming	Lincoln		21.410	34.456		WYO 412 south / California National Historic Trail / Oregon National Historic Trail – Carter	
Wyoming	Lincoln	Kemmerer	34.510	55.538		US 30 east / US 30 Byp. west / California National Historic Trail / Oregon National Historic Trail – Rock Springs, Port of Entry, Cokeville	Interchange; southern end of overlap with US 30; exit 54 on US 30 Byp.
Wyoming	Lincoln	Kemmerer	37.280	59.996		US 30 west – Bear Lake, Montpelier, Idaho	Northern end of overlap with US 30
Wyoming	Lincoln	Kemmerer	38.071	61.269		WYO 233 north – Lake Viva Naughton	
Wyoming	Lincoln		57.490	92.521		WYO 240 south – Granger	
Wyoming	Lincoln		61.390	98.798		WYO 372 east – Fontenelle	
Wyoming	Lincoln	La Barge	84.874	136.591		WYO 235	
Wyoming	Sublette	Big Piney	105.943	170.499		WYO 350 west	
Wyoming	Sublette	Marbleton	109.384	176.036		WYO 351 east – Boulder	
Wyoming	Sublette	Daniel	131.448	211.545		US 191 south – Rock Springs	Southern end of overlap with US 191
Wyoming	Sublette	Daniel	131.730	211.999		WYO 354 west	
Wyoming	Teton	Hoback Junction	184.656	297.175		US 26 west / US 89 south – Alpine Junction	Southern end of overlap with US 26 / US 89
Wyoming	Teton		188.596	303.516		WYO 391 west	
Wyoming	Teton	Jackson	196.391	316.061		WYO 22 west – Wilson, Teton Village	
Wyoming	Teton	Jackson	197.806	318.338		US 26 east / US 89 north / US 191 north (Cache Street) / Broadway Avenue – Teton National Park, Yellowstone National Park	US 189 northern terminus; north end of US 26 / US 89 / US 191 overlap; road continues east as Broadway Avenue
1.000 mi = 1.609 km; 1.000 km = 0.621 mi: Concurrency terminus

Browse numbered routes
← SR-186	UT	→ SR-190
← US 187	WY	→ WYO 190
