= Granger Junction, Wyoming =

Granger Junction
- Unincorporated community
- Location within the state of Wyoming Granger Junction (the United States)
- Coordinates: 41°32′47″N 109°54′51″W
- Country: United States
- State: Wyoming
- County: Sweetwater
- Elevation: 6,382 ft (1,945 m)
- Time zone: UTC-7 (Mountain (MST))
  - Summer (DST): UTC-6 (MDT)
- GNIS feature ID: 1597519

Granger Junction is an unincorporated community in Sweetwater County, in the U.S. state of Wyoming. It is located 5.5 miles (8.9 km) southeast of the town of Granger at the intersection of I-80 and US 30.
