= Cokeville Meadows National Wildlife Refuge =

National Wildlife Refuge in Wyoming, US

- IUCN category IV (habitat/species management area)
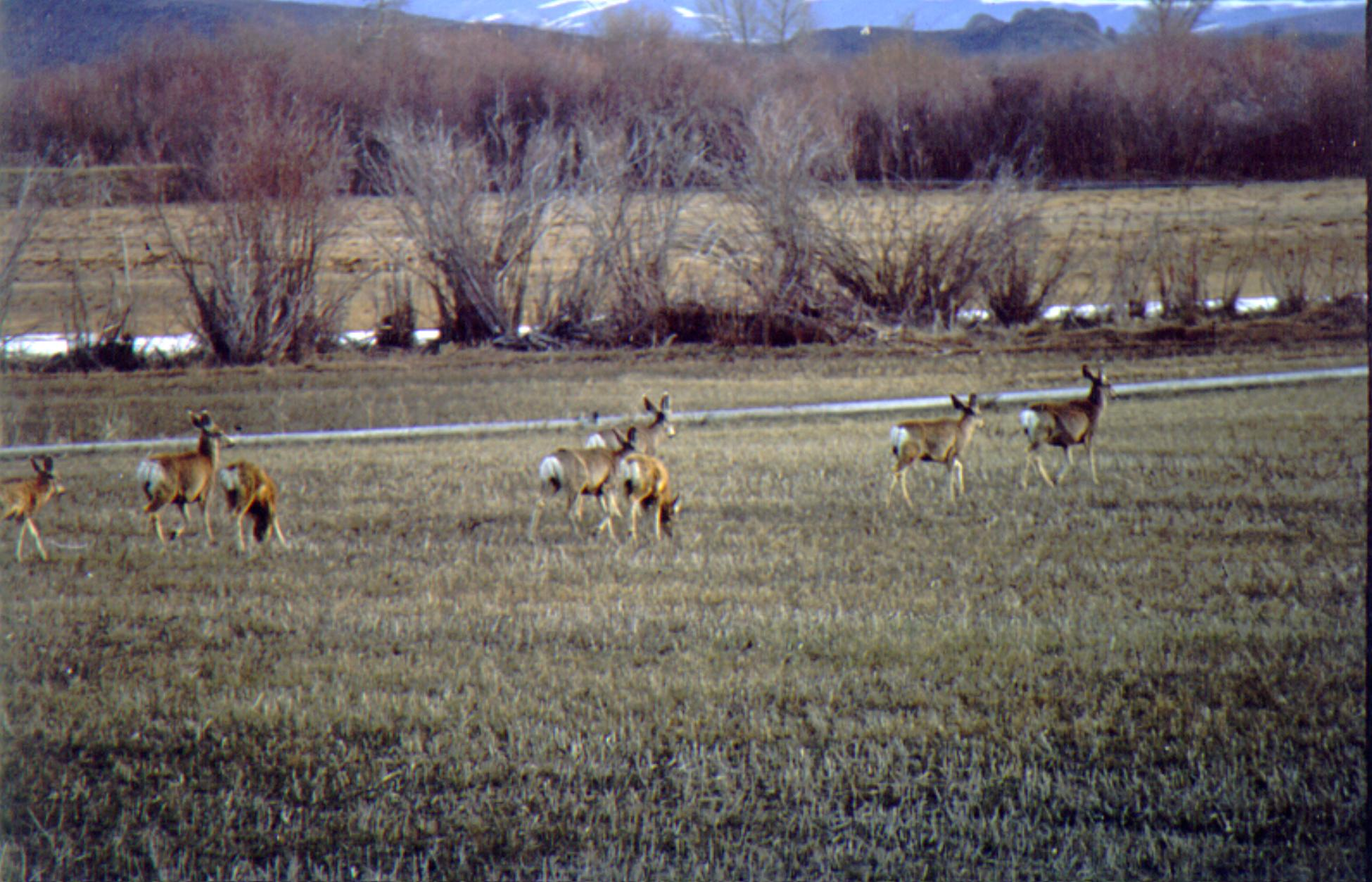

- Location within Wyoming Location within the United States
- Location: Lincoln County, Wyoming, United States
- Nearest city: Cokeville, Wyoming
- Coordinates: 41°57′N 110°59′W
- Area: 26,657 acres (10,788 ha)
- Established: 1993
- Governing body: U.S. Fish and Wildlife Service
- Website: Cokeville Meadows National Wildlife Refuge

Cokeville Meadows National Wildlife Refuge is a National Wildlife Refuge of the United States located in Wyoming. It is managed by the U.S. Fish and Wildlife Service, an agency within the U.S. Department of the Interior.

The refuge occupies 26,657 acres (106 km^{2}) of wetlands along a 20 mile (32 km) stretch of the Bear River that is regarded as the finest redhead duck habitat in the region, and one of the best migratory bird sanctuaries in Wyoming. Other bird species known to inhabit the refuge include white-faced ibis, snowy egret, long-billed curlew, great blue heron, American bittern, and black-crowned night heron. bald and golden eagles as well as peregrine falcons nest on the refuge in spring and fall.

Cokeville Meadows is currently closed to the public except for a wildlife viewing station, because it is new and has no visitor services. Less than a third of the designated refuge lands are under U.S. Government administration, and the rest will be purchased from private landowners who agree to sell. The refuge is managed from the Seedskadee National Wildlife Refuge.

The refuge is located adjacent to U.S. Route 30, 1 mile (1.6 km) south of Cokeville, Wyoming.
