= Special routes of U.S. Route 30 =

Highway system

Special routes of U.S. Route 30

Highway system
- United States Numbered Highway System; List; Special; Divided

Several special routes of U.S. Route 30 exist. In order from west to east, they are as follows.

== Oregon ==
=== St. Helens business loop ===
U.S. Highway 30 Business
- Location: St. Helens, Oregon
- Existed: 2012–present

U.S. Route 30 Business (US 30 Bus.) in St. Helens, Oregon uniquely uses "Interstate Business Loop" shields. This route was designated and is maintained by the local government and does not appear in the official state highways list unlike other business routes.

=== Portland bypass ===
U.S. Highway 30 Bypass
- Location: Portland, Oregon

U.S. Route 30 Bypass serves as a bypass of Portland, Oregon, following several streets through the city's northern neighborhoods. It is designated as the Northeast Portland Highway No. 123 by the Oregon state government.

The bypass route terminates to the west at US 30 in northwest Portland and crosses the Willamette River on the St. Johns Bridge. It travels northeast through Cathedral Park on Philadelphia Avenue, Ivanhoe Street, and Richmond Avenue before turning east onto Lombard Street. The route follows Lombard Street across Portland's northern residential neighborhoods, intersecting Oregon Route 99W, I-5, and Oregon Route 99E. Near Portland International Airport, it dips southeast past the eastern terminus of Columbia Blvd. before an interchange with I-205. The route then leaves Portland on Sandy Boulevard and continues through Fairview before reaching its eastern terminus at an interchange with I-84 and US 30 in Wood Village.

US 30 Bypass was established in the 1930s and designated as a state highway in 1937. The bypass route originally ended at the intersection of Killingsworth Street and Sandy Boulevard in eastern Portland, as the latter carried US 30. In 1955, US 30 was relocated to the new Banfield Expressway (now I-84) and US 30 Bypass was extended along its former alignment to Wood Village. Portions of the bypass on Lombard Street were widened to four lanes in 1965 by eliminating on-street parking.

=== Ontario business loop ===
U.S. Highway 30 Business
- Location: Ontario, Oregon

U.S. Route 30 Business is a business route signed in the Ontario, Oregon area. This road is part of the Olds Ferry-Ontario Highway No. 455.

== Wyoming ==
=== Kemmerer–Diamondville bypass ===
U.S. Highway 30 Bypass
- Location: Kemmerer–Diamondville, Wyoming

U.S. Route 30 Bypass serves as a bypass of Kemmerer and Diamondville Wyoming.

=== Green River business loop ===
U.S. Highway 30 Business
- Location: Green River, Wyoming

Interstate 80 Business
- Location: Green River, Wyoming

U.S. Route 30 Business is a business route signed in the Green River, Wyoming area. This road is entirely overlapped with Interstate 80 Business Loop.

Major intersections

The entire route is in Green River, Sweetwater County.

mi	km	Destinations	Notes
0.000	0.000	I-80 / US 30 – Evanston, Rock Springs	Western terminus of I-80 BL/US 30 Bus.; I-80 exit 89
0.243	0.391	WYO 374 (Service Road) – Jamestown	Eastern terminus of WYO 374
1.770	2.849	WYO 530 – Flaming Gorge National Recreation Area	Northern terminus of WYO 530
2.513	4.044	I-80 / US 30 – Evanston, Rock Springs	Eastern terminus of I-80 BL/US 30 Bus.; I-80 exit 91
1.000 mi = 1.609 km; 1.000 km = 0.621 mi

=== Rock Springs business loop ===
U.S. Highway 30 Business
- Location: Rock Springs, Wyoming

Interstate 80 Business
- Location: Rock Springs, Wyoming

U.S. Route 30 Business is a business route signed in the Rock Springs, Wyoming area. Like the one in Green River, the road is entirely overlapped with the Interstate 80 Business Loop.

=== Rawlins business loop ===
U.S. Highway 30 Business
- Location: Carbon County
- Length: 3.888 mi (6.257 km)

Interstate 80 Business
- Location: Carbon County
- Length: 3.888 mi (6.257 km)

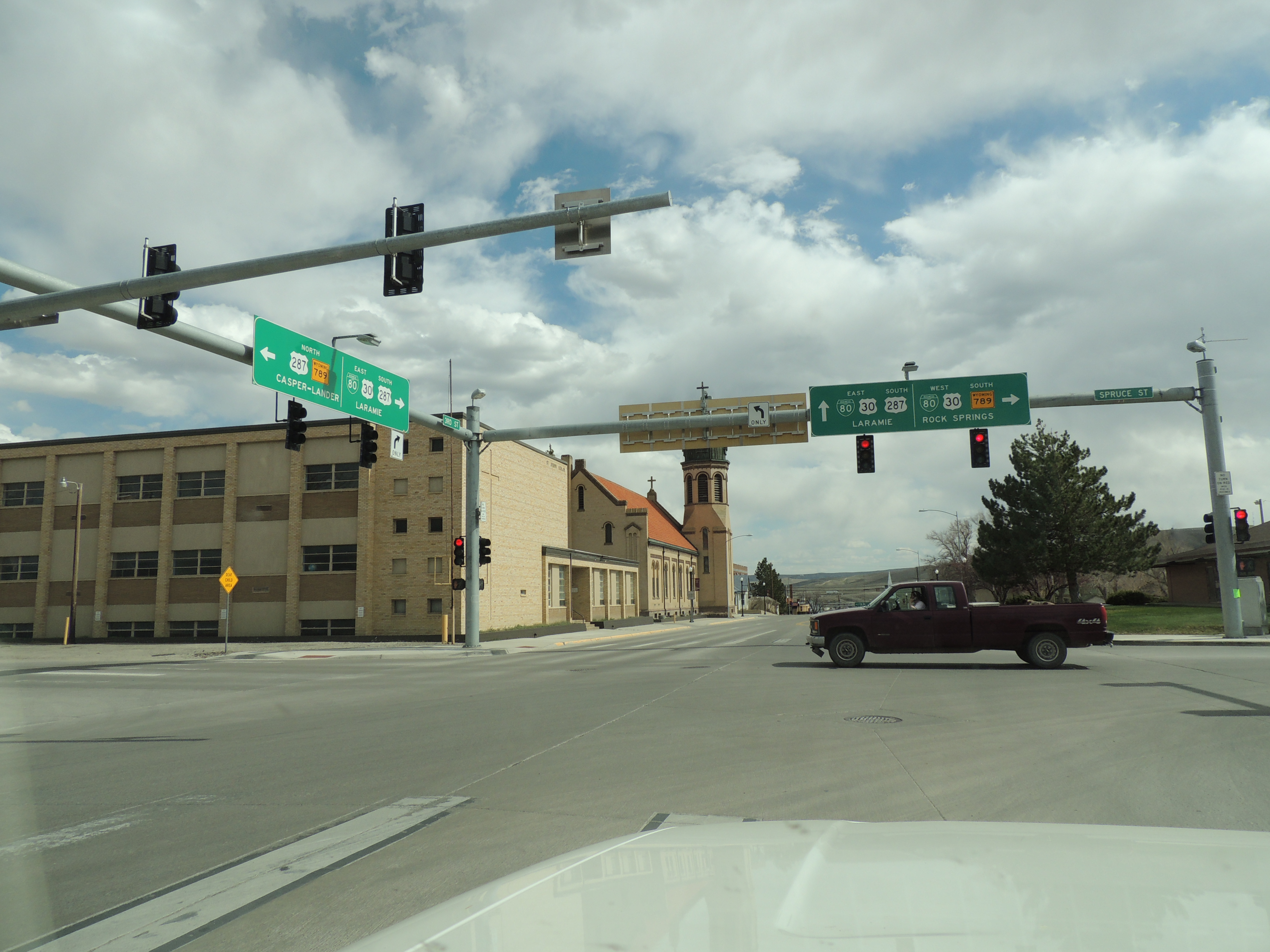
I‑90 BL US 30 Bus. at the intersection of West Spruce and 3rd in streets in Rawlins, May 2014

U.S. Route 30 Business is a business route signed in the Rawlins, Wyoming area. Like the ones in Green River and Rock Springs, the road is entirely overlapped with the Interstate 80 Business Loop.

Description

I-80 BL / US 30 Bus. begins at a diamond interchange on I-80 / US 30 (exit 211) immediately west of the city. From its western terminus it heads east concurrently with WYO 789 along West Spruce Street. In downtown Rawlins, at the intersection of Spruce Street and 3rd Street, the business routes turn south onto 3rd Street, WY 789 turns north onto 3rd Street (also U.S. Route 287 [US 287]), and the business routes begin to run concurrently with US 287.

Three blocks to the south, I-80 BL / US 30 Bus. / US 287 turns east onto Cedar Street and parallels the Union Pacific Railroad along its Rawlins railyard, which serves as the boundary between the Rawlins Subdivision to the west and the Laramie Subdivision to the east. The highway meets the southern end of US 287 Bypass (US 287 Byp; Higley Boulevard) shortly before reaching its eastern terminus at I-80 / US 30 / US 287 (exit 215). Within the trumpet interchange on the south side of I-80 / US 20, the interchange ramps meet the western end of Wyoming Highway 76, which heads east toward Sinclair.

Major intersections

The entire route is in Carbon County.

Location	mi	km	Destinations	Notes
	0.000	0.000	South Wagon Circle Rd west	Continution west beyond western terminus
	0.000	0.000	I-80 east / US 30 east – I‑80 BL / US 30 Bus. I-80 west / US 30 west / WYO 789 south – Wamsutter, Rock Springs	Western terminus; diamond interchange; I‑80 exit 211; western end of US 30 Bus. / WYO 789 concurrency
Rawlins	1.637	2.634	US 287 north / WYO 789 north (3rd St) – Casper, Lander; West Spruce St east	Eastern end of WYO 789 concurrency; western end of US 287 concurrency
Rawlins	3.120	5.021	US 287 Byp. north (Hingley Blvd) – US 287, Casper, Lander	T intersection; southern end of US 287 Byp.
	3.888	6.257	WYO 76 east – Sinclair	Eastbound exit and westbound entrance
	3.888	6.257	I-80 east / US 30 east / US 287 south – Sinclair, Laramie I-80 west / US 30 west – I‑80 BL / US 30 Bus.	Eastern terminus; trumpet interchange; I-80 exit 215; eastern end of US 287 / US 30 Bus. concurrency
1.000 mi = 1.609 km; 1.000 km = 0.621 mi: Concurrency terminus; Incomplete access

== Nebraska ==
=== Columbus alternate route ===
U.S. Highway 30 Alternate
- Location: Columbus, Nebraska
- Length: 8.9 mi (14.3 km)

U.S. Route 30 Alternate is an alternate route in the Columbus, Nebraska area. The route begins in central Columbus where US 30 and US 81 meet, then heads eastbound in a concurrency with US 81 north. The route departs from US 81 heading onto Lost Creek Parkway, which loops around the north side of Columbus. Then it curves south, becoming East 6th Avenue, where it ends at its eastern terminus at the intersection with US 30 in east Columbus. The entire highway serves as a truck route for US 30 travelers.

Major intersections

The entire route is in Platte County.

Location	mi	km	Destinations	Notes
Columbus	0.00	0.00	US 30 east (23rd Street east) US 30 west / US 81 south (33rd Avenue)	Western terminus; west end of US 81 concurrency; highway continues east on 23rd St. as US 30
Columbus Township	2.8	4.5	US 81 north	East end of US 81 concurrency
Columbus	8.9	14.3	23rd Street (US 30)	Eastern terminus; road continues south as East 6th Avenue
1.000 mi = 1.609 km; 1.000 km = 0.621 mi: Concurrency terminus

== Iowa ==
=== Marshalltown business loop ===
U.S. Highway 30 Business
- Location: Marshalltown, Iowa
- Existed: 1997–present

U.S. Route 30 Business is a business route that runs along Iowa Avenue in Marshalltown, Iowa. The route runs on the former alignment of US 30 through the town, a 1950s-era bypass of Marshalltown that was bypassed in 1997 by a freeway 3/4 mile (1.2 km) south of the original bypass.

=== Toledo–Tama business loop ===
U.S. Highway 30 Business
- Location: Toledo–Tama, Iowa
- Existed: 2011–present

U.S. Route 30 Business (US 30) is a business route located in Toledo and Tama. In the early 2010s, a new freeway was built for US 30 between the two cities. When the freeway opened, the business route was designated along the old route.

=== Cedar Rapids emergency route ===
U.S. Highway 30 Emergency
- Location: Cedar Rapids, Iowa
- Existed: 1985–present

U.S. Route 30 Emergency ( US 30 Emerg) is an emergency bypass of a segment of the US 30 freeway bypass of Cedar Rapids, Iowa. Since the Cedar Rapids bypass of US 30 was completed in 1985, on occasion, traffic has had to be rerouted off the road. The bypass's proximity to the Union Pacific Railroad mainline resulted in an elevated roadway between Edgewood Road and Sixth Street SW. When strong winds come from the south, fog produced by an Archer Daniels Midland plant adjacent to the highway billows over the road making driving dangerous. The Iowa DOT set up an emergency detour from Edgewood Road SW north to 16th Avenue SW east to 6th Street SW back to US 30. The frequency of fog-related detours has decreased in recent years due to improved technology and the plant's expansion and relocation of cooling towers away from the highway.

== Ohio ==
=== Van Wert business loop ===
U.S. Route 30 Business
- Location: Van Wert, Ohio

U.S. Route 30 Business is a locally-designated business loop that follows the original route of US 30 and the Lincoln Highway through downtown Van Wert, Ohio.

=== Dalton alternate route ===
U.S. Route 30 Alternate
- Location: Dalton, Ohio
- Existed: 1963–present

U.S. Route 30 Alternate is a 3-mile (4.8 km) alternate route through downtown Dalton, Ohio. It follows the original route of US 30 through town, while the mainline designation follows a 4-lane bypass.

== Pennsylvania ==
=== Bedford business loop ===
U.S. Route 30 Business
- Location: Bedford, Pennsylvania
- Existed: 1970–present

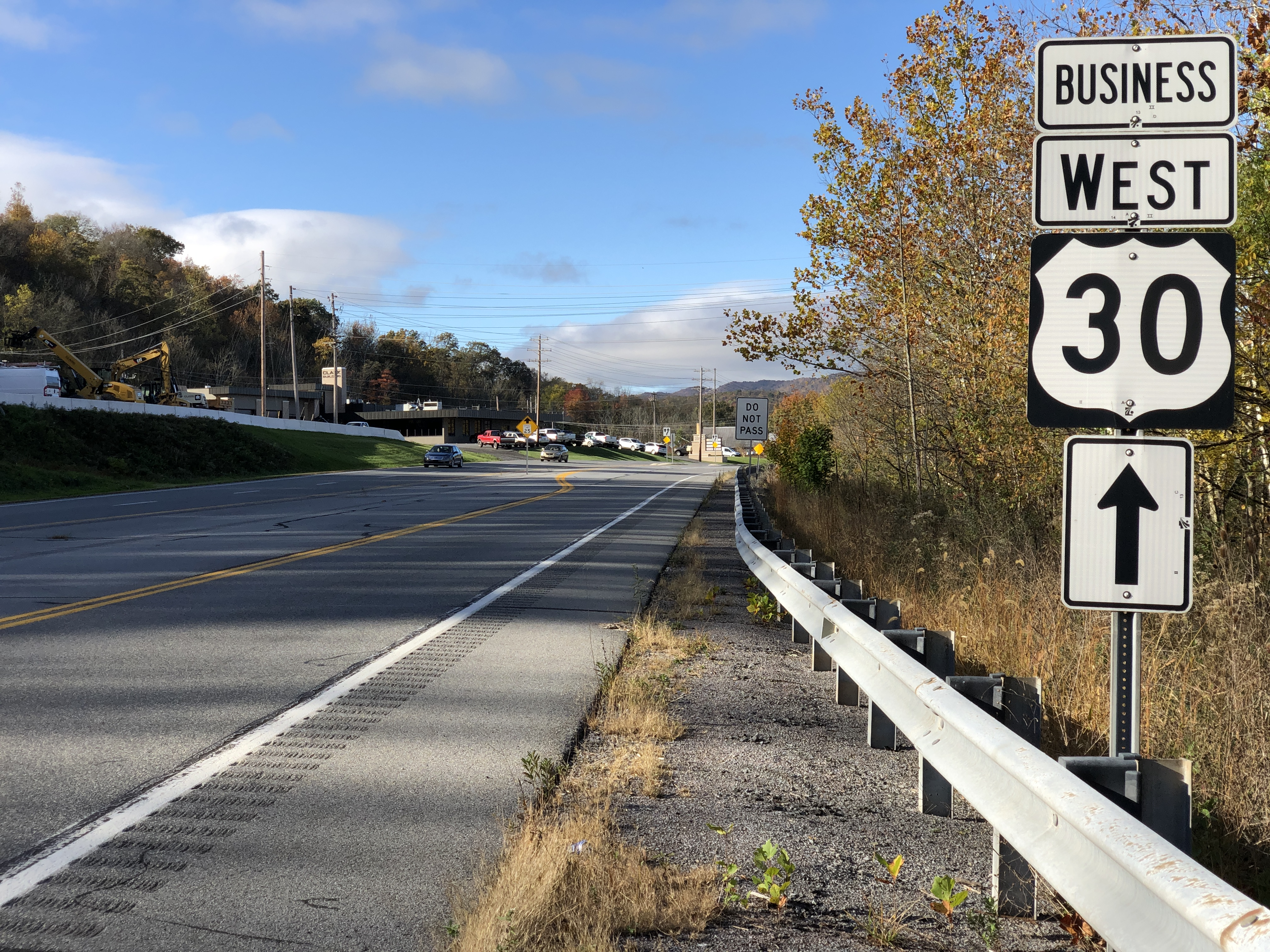
US 30 Bus. westbound past US 30 near Bedford

U.S. Route 30 Business is a 3-mile (4.8 km) business loop through the borough of Bedford, Pennsylvania. In 1970, US 30 became a freeway around the town, to avoid congestion for travellers along the Pennsylvania Turnpike or U.S. Route 220 (today also Interstate 99), a pair of area freeways from which Bedford was a major travel stop. After the creation of the bypass, the original path of US 30 along Pitt Street became a business route, travelling as a narrow two-lane stretch through the town, with a four-lane segment near some light industrial development before its eastern terminus.

=== Everett business loop ===
U.S. Route 30 Business
- Location: Everett, Pennsylvania
- Existed: 1982–present

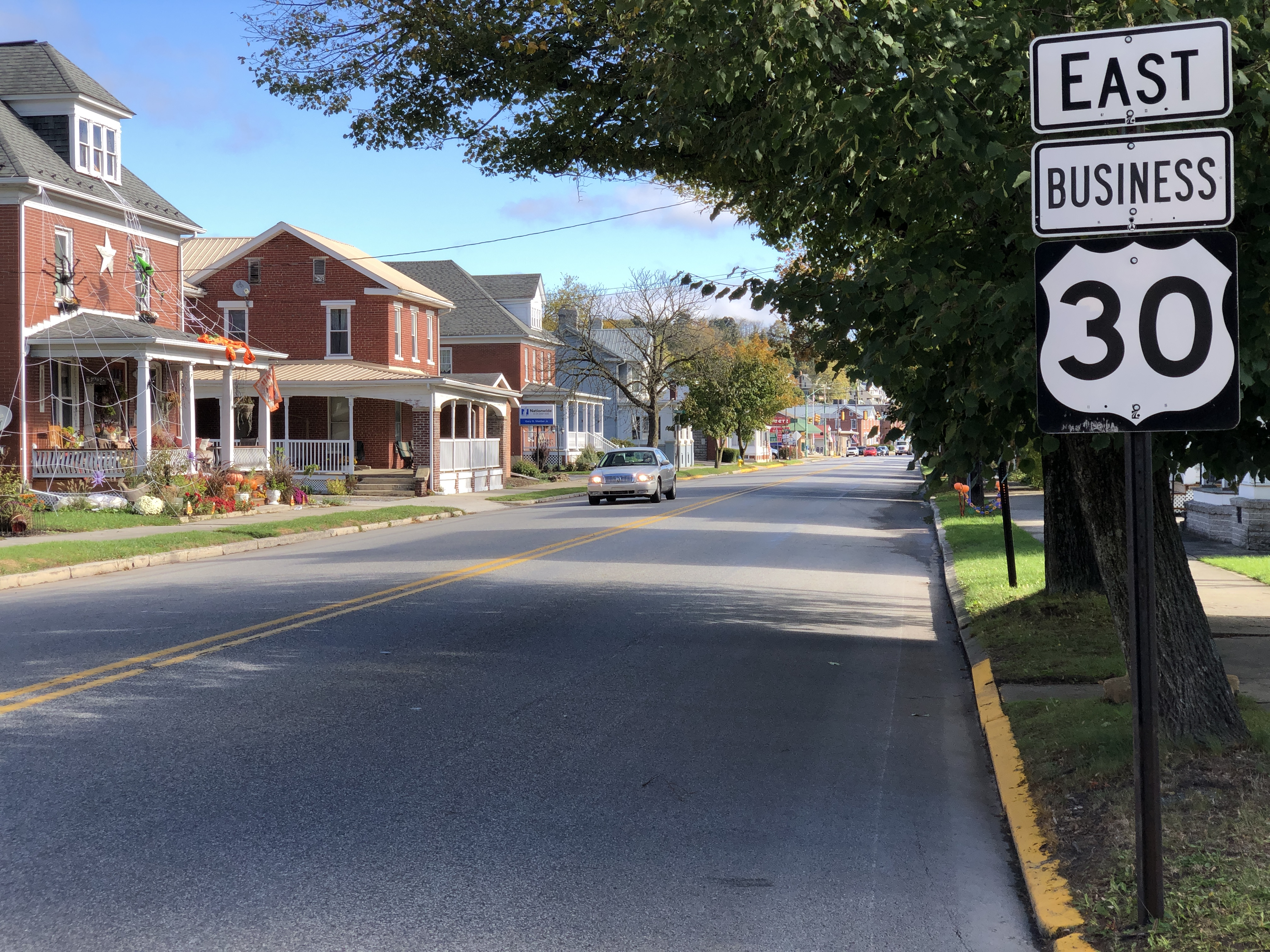
US 30 Bus. eastbound in Everett

U.S. Route 30 Business is a 2-mile (3.2 km) business loop through the borough of Everett, Pennsylvania. In 1982, a freeway bypass was constructed around the town because of its low-speed limits and lack of opportunities for highway widening. As a result, the original alignment of US 30 became a business route. It is two lanes through the small, crowded town. Near the eastern edge of the routing, alternate third passing lines are provided, as the road traverses a county park and a golf course.

=== Chester County business loop ===
U.S. Route 30 Business
- Location: Chester County, Pennsylvania
- Length: 18.79 mi (30.24 km)
- Existed: 1963–present

U.S. Route 30 Business (US 30 Bus.) is a 19-mile (31 km) business route of US 30 in Chester County, Pennsylvania. The route follows the former alignment of US 30 between Sadsbury Township and East Whiteland Township, passing through Coatesville, Downingtown, and Exton. US 30 follows a freeway bypass between these two points. The present alignment of US 30 Bus. was originally part of a turnpike called the Philadelphia and Lancaster Turnpike that was completed in 1794. The state took over the turnpike in the beginning of the 20th century. In 1913, present-day US 30 Bus. was incorporated into the Lincoln Highway, an auto trail that ran from San Francisco to New York City. The Lincoln Highway through Pennsylvania became Pennsylvania Route 1 (PA 1) in 1924. US 30 was designated concurrent with PA 1 west of Philadelphia in 1926, with the PA 1 designation removed two years later. US 30 was widened into a multilane road through Chester County in the 1930s. In the 1960s, US 30 was moved to a freeway bypass around Coatesville and Downingtown, with US 30 Bus. designated onto the former alignment of US 30. In 1995, US 30 Bus. was extended east when US 30 was extended to bypass Exton.

=== Coatesville business loop alternate truck route ===
U.S. Route 30 Business Alternate Truck
- Location: Coatesville, Pennsylvania
- Existed: 2013–present

U.S. Route 30 Business Alternate Truck (US 30 Bus. Alt. Truck) is a truck route of US 30 Bus. around a weight-restricted bridge over the West Branch Brandywine Creek in Coatesville, on which trucks over 30 tons are prohibited. The route follows Airport Road, US 30, and PA 82. Signs were posted in 2025.

=== Downingtown business loop alternate truck route ===
U.S. Route 30 Business Alternate Truck
- Location: Downingtown, Pennsylvania
- Existed: 2013–present

U.S. Route 30 Business Alternate Truck (US 30 Bus. Alt. Truck) is a truck route of US 30 Bus. around a weight-restricted bridge over the East Branch Brandywine Creek in Downingtown, Pennsylvania, on which trucks over 36 tons and combination loads over 40 tons are prohibited. The route follows US 322, the US 30 freeway, and PA 113. US 30 Bus. Alt. Truck runs concurrent with US 322 Alt. Truck along US 30 and PA 113.

Major intersections

The entire route is in Chester County.

Location	mi	km	Destinations	Notes
Downingtown			US 30 Bus. / US 322 east (Lancaster Avenue)	Western terminus; western end of US 322 overlap
Caln Township			Western end of freeway	
Caln Township			US 30 west (Coatesville Downingtown Bypass) – Coatesville, Lancaster US 322 west (Manor Avenue) – Honey Brook	Eastern end of US 322 overlap; western end of US 30 overlap
Downingtown			PA 282 (Wallace Avenue)	Westbound exit and eastbound entrance; access via Norwood Road
East Caln Township			US 30 east (Coatesville Downingtown Bypass) – Exton PA 113 north (West Uwchlan Avenue) to PA 100 – Lionville	Western end of US 30 overlap; western end of PA 113 overlap; eastbound exit and westbound entrance
East Caln Township			Eastern end of freeway	
Downingtown			US 30 Bus. (Lancaster Avenue) – Exton, Downingtown	Eastern end of PA 113 overlap; eastern terminus; southern terminus of PA 113
1.000 mi = 1.609 km; 1.000 km = 0.621 mi: Concurrency terminus; Incomplete access

== Former ==
=== Portland business loop ===
U.S. Highway 30 Business
- Location: Portland, Oregon
- Length: 5.56 mi (8.95 km)
- Existed: 2007

U.S. Route 30 Business was a 5.56-mile-long (8.95 km) business route for U.S. Route 30 in eastern Portland, Oregon, running along Burnside Street and Sandy Boulevard. Unlike a standard business route, neither end was at US 30 - the west end was at Oregon Route 99E (Martin Luther King Boulevard and Grand Avenue; Pacific Highway East) at the east end of the Burnside Bridge, and the east end was at U.S. Route 30 Bypass (Northeast Portland Highway) at the Interstate 205 interchange. It crossed US 30, which is concurrent with Interstate 84, at around its midpoint. The whole route was the Sandy Boulevard Highway No. 59 (see Oregon highways and routes) until July 10, 2003, when it was given to the city (along with an adjacent part of Route 99E a month later). The US 30 Business designation was removed from what had become a city street on July 5, 2007.

Though the west end was just south of an interchange with US 30/I-84, there are no ramps pointing in the correct direction. The reason for this strange end is that US 30 originally exited I-84 there and ran south on Route 99E, and then turned west onto the Burnside Bridge through downtown. (It continued along Burnside Street, 18th Avenue/19th Avenue, Vaughn Street, Wardway Street and St. Helens Road.) When US 30 was realigned to use Interstate 5 and Interstate 405 around the north side of downtown, US 30 Business remained the same (except for a one-block extension west from Route 99E northbound, resulting in a milepost of -0.05 for the west end at Route 99E southbound).

Major intersections

The entire route was in Portland, Multnomah County.

mi	km	Destinations	Notes
−0.05	−0.080	To I-5 south / Burnside Bridge to Naito Parkway – Salem	Continuation beyond OR 99E
−0.05	−0.080	OR 99E south (Southeast Martin Luther King Jr. Boulevard)	
0.00	0.00	OR 99E north (Northeast Grand Avenue) to I-5 north / I-84 east / US 30 east – Oregon City, Salem	
0.36	0.58	East Burnside Street	
1.89	3.04	I-84 / US 30 (Banfield Expressway) to I-5 – Portland City Center	
4.52	7.27	OR 213 (Northeast 82nd Avenue)	
5.51	8.87	US 30 Byp. (Columbia Boulevard, Sandy Boulevard) to I-205	
1.000 mi = 1.609 km; 1.000 km = 0.621 mi

=== Portland alternate route ===
U.S. Highway 30 Alternate
- Location: Portland – Troutdale
- Existed: 1930s–1960s

U.S. Route 30 Alternate was an alternate of U.S. Route 30. The route began at U.S. 30 at the intersection of Bunside and Sandy, and ran along Burnside Street, Gilham Avenue, Thorburn Street, Washington Street and Stark Street (alternately known as Baseline Road due to being the baseline of the Willamette Stone), before rejoining U.S. 30 at the intersection of Stark and Crown Point Highway. It stemmed from the desire by the city of Gresham, Oregon to be connected to U.S. 30. The route existed in maps from the 1920s, 1930s and 1940s, but has long since been deleted.

=== Idaho-Utah-Wyoming southern route ===
U.S. Route 30S
- Location: Burley, Idaho–Granger, Wyoming
- Existed: 1926–1970s

U.S. Route 30 South (US 30S) was initially a split route, and later an alternate route, of US 30 between Burley, Idaho and Granger, Wyoming. US 30S followed the general route of today's Interstate 84 across Idaho and western Utah, and Interstate 80 across eastern Utah and Wyoming. The route was decommissioned in the 1970s.

In the initial proposals for the U.S. Numbered Highway System, all of US Route 30 was to follow the Lincoln Highway, with the western terminus at Salt Lake City, Utah. The Lincoln Highway Association was upset as refinements to the initial proposal modified the route of US 30 to break from the Lincoln Highway in Wyoming and proceed to the Pacific Northwest, as they were assured that the Lincoln Highway would have a single numerical designation. Utah was upset at these modifications, as they would completely remove the US 30 routing in that state. Wyoming, Nevada, Idaho and Utah all made conflicting proposals for the route. As a compromise, a split route was approved. In the approved U.S. Numbered Highway System numbering plan in 1926, US 30 split between Idaho and Wyoming. US 30N, the northern route, passed directly from Wyoming to Idaho, while a southern route entered Utah. Eventually the northern route became mainline US 30, leaving US 30S as an alternate route.

In the state of Utah's route logs, US Route 30S is acknowledged as late as 1970 in numerous highway transfer resolutions as segments of interstates 80 and 80N were completed. However, all references to US 30S are gone from the state's highway resolutions by the time the state requested a designation change of I-80N to its modern designation of I-84 in 1977.

In all three states, the freeway replacements used shorter, straighter alignments compared to the former US 30S; some small towns were bypassed when the two-lane roads were replaced with freeways. A significant case is at the Idaho state line, where I-84 runs roughly 18 miles (29 km) to the east of the former US 30S. Portions of the former alignment of US 30S in this area are now designated Idaho State Highway 81, Utah State Route 42 and Utah State Route 30. Another significant deviation is at the eastern terminus of US 30S, where Interstate 80 was routed several miles south of Granger, bypassing the town.

=== Nebraska–Iowa alternate route ===
U.S. Highway 30A
- Location: Near Clarks, Nebraska–Missouri Valley, Iowa
- Existed: 1930s–1960s

U.S. Highway 30 Alternate (US 30A) was an alternate route of US 30 that ran between Clarks and Omaha in Nebraska, then across the Missouri River into Iowa, where it ran between Council Bluffs and Missouri Valley. The route was created on the former US 30 alignment by the mid-1930s when US 30 was routed west of Missouri Valley on old Iowa Highway 130. By the end of the 1960s, US 30A in Iowa became Iowa Highway 183.

=== Central Iowa alternate route ===
U.S. Highway 30 Alternate
- Location: Ogden–Marshalltown, Iowa
- Existed: 1973–1981

U.S. Highway 30 Alternate (US 30 Alternate) was a former mainline routing of US 30 through central Iowa that was bypassed by a four-lane highway in 1973. The alternate route began in Ogden, where the bypass began, and passed through Boone, Ames, Nevada, Colo, and State Center. The route ended between State Center and Marshalltown. It was in service for eight years before it became Iowa 930, which was an unsigned highway.

=== Clinton alternate route ===
U.S. Highway 30 Alternate
- Location: Clinton, Iowa
- Existed: 1957–1967

U.S. Route 30 Alternate was an alternate route of US 30 that ran through Clinton, Iowa. In 1957, US 30 was rerouted over the Gateway Bridge across the Mississippi River, and Iowa Highway 136 was designated to cross the Lyons-Fulton Bridge. However, by 1957, the old alignment through Clinton and across the Lyons-Fulton Bridge was numbered U.S. Route 30 Alternate. By 1967, US 30 Alternate was reverted to Iowa Highway 136.

=== Sterling–Chicago alternate route ===
U.S. Route 30 Alternate
- Location: Sterling–Lynwood, Illinois
- Existed: 1942–1971

U.S. Route 30 Alternate (US 30 Alt.) was an alternate route of US 30 after US 330 was decommissioned in 1942. It traveled from Sterling through Chicago to Lynwood near the Indiana state line. By the early 1970s, the alternate route was removed and partly replaced by Illinois Route 38.

=== Aurora business loop ===
U.S. Route 30 Business
- Location: Aurora, Illinois
- Existed: 1959–1970

U.S. Route 30 City (later named U.S. Route 30 Business) was a business route for US 30. By 1959, US 30 was rerouted south of Sugar Grove after the southern bypass was completed. The old route that ran through Aurora was designated as a business route. It followed Galena Boulevard and Hill Avenue. In 1970, the business route was decommissioned entirely.

=== Illinois toll route ===
Toll U.S. Route 30
- Location: Ford Heights-Aurora, Illinois
- Existed: 1958–1966

U.S. Route 30 Toll was a toll route of US 30. In 1958, Toll US 30 was formed after the East-West Tollway and the Tri-State Tollway were finished. The toll route followed the original route of the East-West Tollway, a southern portion of the Tri-State Tollway, and present-day Illinois Route 394 before reaching US 30 in East Chicago Heights (now Ford Heights). In 1966, Toll US 30 was decommissioned and was partly replaced with Illinois Route 190.

=== US 30S in Ohio ===
U.S. Route 30S
- Location: Delphos-Mansfield, Ohio
- Existed: 1920s–1973

Between Van Wert and Mansfield, Ohio, US 30 split into a more direct route as US 30 N and a less direct route, US-30S. U.S. Route 30S, a divided U.S. route of US 30 until November 1973 when what was US 30N became the mainline of US 30. US 30S was numbered in the 1920s to avoid conflict from local business owners worried about the diversion of traffic from their shops along the southern route.

The whole of old US 30S in Ohio is now Ohio State Route 309.

=== Allegheny County truck route ===
U.S. Route 30 Truck
- Location: Allegheny County, Pennsylvania
- Existed: 2013–early 2017

U.S. Route 30 Truck was a truck route around a weight-restricted bridge over the South Fork Montour Run in North Fayette Township near Pittsburgh, Pennsylvania, on which trucks over 29 tons and combination loads over 40 tons are prohibited. The route followed Clinton Road and Interstate 376.

=== Philadelphia bypass ===
U.S. Route 30 Bypass
- Location: Bryn Mawr-Philadelphia, Pennsylvania

U.S. Route 30 Bypass (US 30 Byp.) was a bypass route of a section of US 30 between Bryn Mawr and Philadelphia in Pennsylvania. It was also known as U.S. Route 30 Alternate (US 30 Alt.) in Philadelphia. The route began at US 30 in Bryn Mawr and headed southeast on County Line Road, forming the border between Delaware County to the southwest and Montgomery County to the northeast. US 30 Byp. fully entered Delaware County and continued through suburban areas as Haverford Road. The road curved into Montgomery County, where it passed through Penn Wynne, before it crossed into Philadelphia at the US 1/US 13 Byp. (City Avenue) intersection, where it became Haverford Avenue. The bypass route continued east along Haverford Avenue and Lansdowne Avenue, reaching its eastern terminus at another intersection with US 30. PA 201 was originally designated along Haverford Road and Haverford Avenue by 1928, running between US 30 (Lancaster Pike) in Bryn Mawr and US 30 (Lancaster Avenue) in Philadelphia. US 30 Byp. was cosigned with PA 201 by 1940, continuing east from PA 201's eastern terminus along Lancaster Avenue, then becoming concurrent with US 1/US 13 on Powelton Avenue, 31st/32nd Streets, and Spring Garden Street before rejoining US 30 across the Schuylkill River at Eakins Oval. By 1950, PA 201 was decommissioned. In the 1950s, the eastern terminus of US 30 Byp. was rerouted along Lansdowne Avenue to end at US 30. US 30 Byp. was decommissioned in the 1960s.

Major intersections

County	Location	mi	km	Destinations	Notes
Delaware–Montgomery county line	Radnor Township–Lower Merion Township line			US 30 (Lancaster Avenue)	Western terminus
Montgomery–Philadelphia county line	Lower Merion Township–Philadelphia line			US 1 / US 13 Byp. (City Avenue)	
Philadelphia	Philadelphia			US 30 (Lancaster Avenue)	Eastern terminus
1.000 mi = 1.609 km; 1.000 km = 0.621 mi

== See also ==
- List of special routes of the United States Numbered Highway System
