= Wyoming Highway 353 =

State highway in Wyoming, United States

Wyoming Highway 353
- WYO 353 highlighted in red

Route information
- Maintained by WYDOT
- Length: 15.51 mi (24.96 km)

Major junctions
- West end: US 191 in Boulder
- East end: CR 118 / CR 133 near Big Sandy

Location
- Country: United States
- State: Wyoming
- Counties: Sublette

Highway system
- Wyoming State Highway System; Interstate; US; State
← WYO 352	→ WYO 354

Wyoming Highway 353 (WYO 353) is a 15.51-mile-long (24.96 km) east-west Wyoming state road located in east-central Sublette County. WYO 353 provides travel between U.S. Route 191 (US 191) at Boulder to Big Sandy and eastern Sublette County.

== Route description ==
Wyoming Highway 353 begins its western end at U.S. Route 191 in Boulder. Highway 353 travels eastward from Boulder, and meets the East Fork River which it roughly parallels it for most of its length. WYO 353 turns southeasterly and will remain on that routing till its end. At 14.4 miles, the East Fork River is crossed and WYO 353 ends at Milepost 15.51 at an intersection with Sublette CR 118 and CR 133. CR 118 continues to Big Sandy.

== Major intersections ==
The entire route is in Sublette County.

Location	mi	km	Destinations	Notes
Boulder	0.00	0.00	US 191	
	15.51	24.96	CR 118 (Big Sandy-Elkhorn Road) / CR 133 (Eastfork Big Sandy Road)	Continuation beyond eastern terminus
1.000 mi = 1.609 km; 1.000 km = 0.621 mi

== See also ==
- List of state highways in Wyoming
- List of highways numbered 353
