= Seedskadee National Wildlife Refuge =

Wildlife refuge in Wyoming, United States

- IUCN category IV (habitat/species management area)
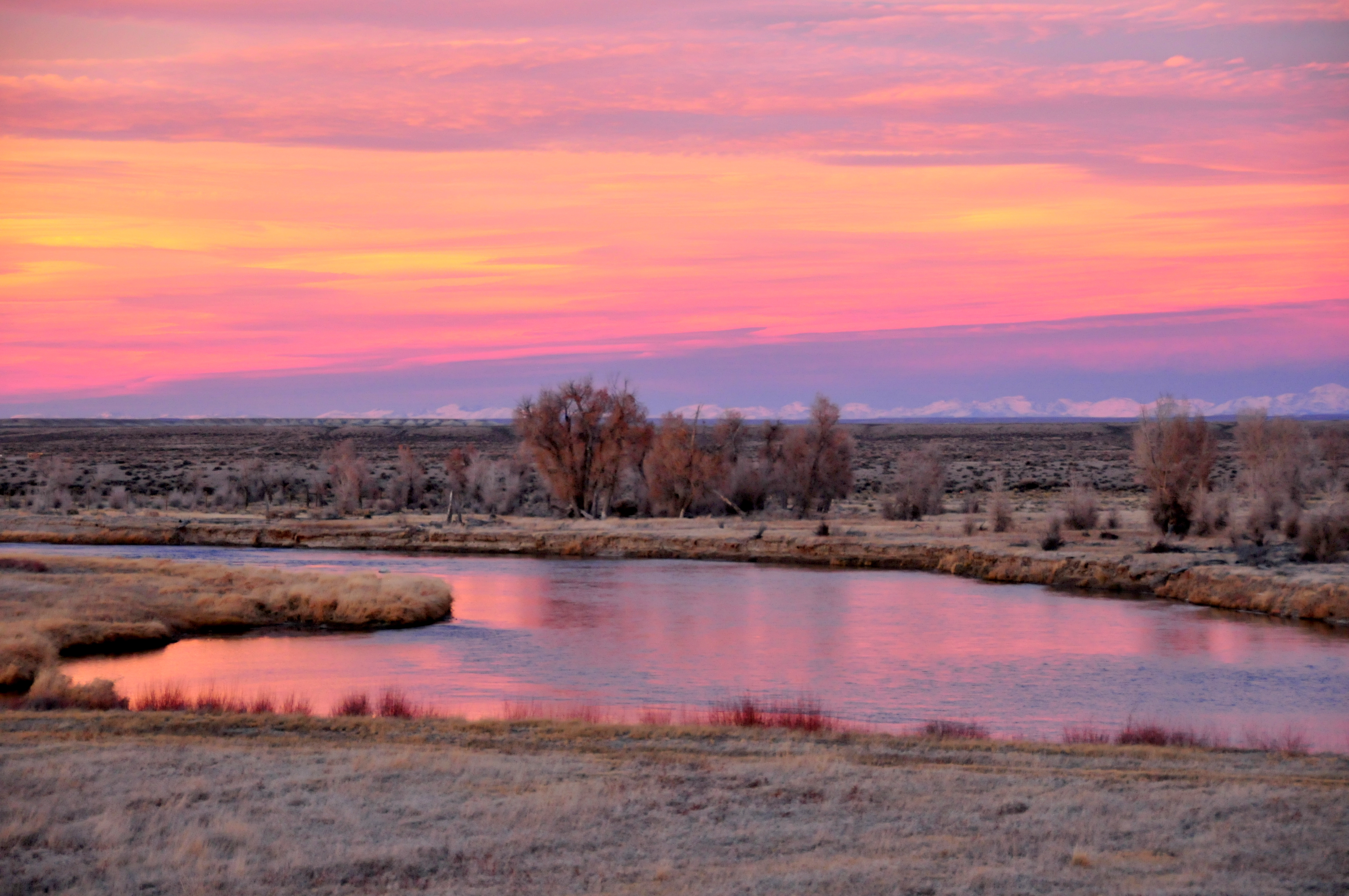

- Location within Wyoming Location within the United States
- Location: Sweetwater County, Wyoming, United States
- Nearest city: Green River, WY
- Coordinates: 41°51′25″N 109°50′14″W
- Area: 26,400 acres (10,700 ha)
- Established: January 1, 1965
- Governing body: U.S. Fish and Wildlife Service
- Website: Seedskadee National Wildlife Refuge

Seedskadee National Wildlife Refuge is a National Wildlife Refuge of the United States located in western Sweetwater County in the state of Wyoming. It covers 26,400 acres (106 km^{2}) managed by the U.S. Fish and Wildlife Service, an agency within the U.S. Department of the Interior.

The Shoshone people inhabited the region since the year 1300. The name Seedskadee is derived from the Shoshone language word sisk-a-dee-agie, which means "river of the prairie hen". The area was first visited by white explorers in 1811 and was later a crossroads for the Oregon and Mormon Trails; many of the original wagon tracks left by early pioneers can still be seen.

The refuge includes 36 miles (56 km) of the Green River, which is a water source for shrubs and cottonwoods in an otherwise arid region. The refuge was established in 1965 to mitigate wildlife habitat loss resulting from the construction of Fontenelle Dam upstream and Flaming Gorge Dam downstream on the Green River.

220 species of birds have been identified on the refuge including migratory bird species that use the refuge for nesting. Trumpeter swans, bald eagles, sage grouse, and numerous species of ducks can be found. Dozens of species of mammals including coyote, porcupine, pronghorn, mule deer, bobcat, and moose are indigenous to the region and are protected under law. The Green River hosts Snake River fine-spotted and Bonneville cutthroat trout, and brown and rainbow trout. Visitors access the refuge by taking Interstate 80 west from Green River, Wyoming, for 6 miles (9.6 km) to Wyoming Highway 372. The entrance is 27 miles (43 km) to the north.

== See also ==
- Cokeville Meadows National Wildlife Refuge, operated as a satellite of Seedskadee NWR
