= Opal, Wyoming =

- Town
- Location of Opal in Lincoln County, Wyoming.
- Coordinates: 41°46′05″N 110°19′27″W
- Country: United States
- State: Wyoming
- County: Lincoln

Government
  - Type: Municipal

Area
  - Total: 0.39 sq mi (1.02 km^{2})
  - Land: 0.39 sq mi (1.02 km^{2})
  - Water: 0 sq mi (0.00 km^{2})
- Elevation: 6,670 ft (2,030 m)

Population (2020)
  - Total: 64
  - Density: 276.6/sq mi (106.79/km^{2})
- Time zone: UTC-7 (Mountain (MST))
  - Summer (DST): UTC-6 (MDT)
- ZIP code: 83124
- Area code: 307
- FIPS code: 56-57810
- GNIS feature ID: 2413082

Opal is a town in Lincoln County, Wyoming, United States. The population was 64 at the 2020 census.

== Geography ==
According to the United States Census Bureau, the town has a total area of 0.39 square miles (1.01 km^{2}), all land.

== Demographics ==
Historical population
Census	Pop.	Note	%±
1940	78		—
1950	67		−14.1%
1960	55		−17.9%
1970	34		−38.2%
1990	95		—
2000	102		7.4%
2010	96		−5.9%
2020	64		−33.3%
U.S. Decennial Census

=== 2010 census ===
As of the census of 2010, there were 96 people, 38 households, and 28 families living in the town. The population density was 246.2 inhabitants per square mile (95.1/km^{2}). There were 51 housing units at an average density of 130.8 per square mile (50.5/km^{2}). The racial makeup of the town was 92.7% White, 1.0% Native American, 1.0% Asian, 3.1% from other races, and 2.1% from two or more races. Hispanic or Latino of any race were 7.3% of the population.

There were 38 households, of which 26.3% had children under the age of 18 living with them, 60.5% were married couples living together, 5.3% had a female householder with no husband present, 7.9% had a male householder with no wife present, and 26.3% were non-families. 10.5% of all households were made up of individuals, and 2.6% had someone living alone who was 65 years of age or older. The average household size was 2.53 and the average family size was 2.82.

The median age in the town was 44.5 years. 24% of residents were under the age of 18; 8.3% were between the ages of 18 and 24; 18.9% were from 25 to 44; 43.8% were from 45 to 64; and 5.2% were 65 years of age or older. The gender makeup of the town was 58.3% male and 41.7% female.

== Education ==
It is within Lincoln County School District 1.
