= James Town, Wyoming =

Census-designated place in Sweetwater County, Wyoming, United States

- Census-designated place
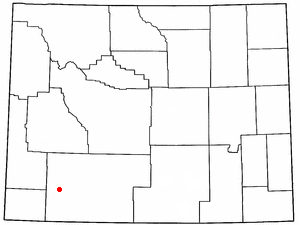
- Location of James Town, Wyoming
- Coordinates: 41°33′35″N 109°30′53″W
- Country: United States
- State: Wyoming
- County: Sweetwater

Area
  - Total: 3.38 sq mi (8.8 km^{2})
  - Land: 3.16 sq mi (8.2 km^{2})
  - Water: 0.22 sq mi (0.57 km^{2})
- Elevation: 6,165 ft (1,879 m)

Population (2020)
  - Total: 455
  - Density: 144/sq mi (55.6/km^{2})
- Time zone: UTC-7 (Mountain (MST))
  - Summer (DST): UTC-6 (MDT)
- Area code: 307
- FIPS code: 56-40265
- GNIS feature ID: 2408436

James Town is a census-designated place (CDP) in Sweetwater County, Wyoming, United States. The population was 536 at the 2010 census.

== Geography ==
According to the United States Census Bureau, the CDP has a total area of 3.38 square miles (8.8 km^{2}), of which 3.16 square miles (8.2 km^{2}) is land and 0.2 square mile (0.6 km^{2}) (6.6%) is water.

== Demographics ==
As of the census of 2000, there were 552 people, 211 households, and 162 families residing in the CDP. The population density was 66.0 people per square mile (25.5/km^{2}). There were 221 housing units at an average density of 26.4/sq mi (10.2/km^{2}). The racial makeup of the CDP was 95.29% White, 0.36% African American, 0.36% Native American, 1.09% from other races, and 2.90% from two or more races. Hispanic or Latino of any race were 6.52% of the population.

There were 211 households, out of which 31.8% had children under the age of 18 living with them, 65.9% were married couples living together, 5.2% had a female householder with no husband present, and 23.2% were non-families. 19.4% of all households were made up of individuals, and 4.3% had someone living alone who was 65 years of age or older. The average household size was 2.62 and the average family size was 2.98.

In the CDP, the population was spread out, with 25.2% under the age of 18, 8.7% from 18 to 24, 25.9% from 25 to 44, 31.7% from 45 to 64, and 8.5% who were 65 years of age or older. The median age was 40 years. For every 100 females, there were 109.1 males. For every 100 females age 18 and over, there were 106.5 males.

The median income for a household in the CDP was $52,083, and the median income for a family was $53,295. Males had a median income of $38,618 versus $30,083 for females. The per capita income for the CDP was $18,708. About 4.5% of families and 8.0% of the population were below the poverty line, including 4.8% of those under age 18 and none of those age 65 or over.

== Education ==
Public education in the community of James Town is provided by Sweetwater County School District #2.

== See also ==
- List of census-designated places in Wyoming
