= Interstate 80 in Wyoming =

Interstate Highway in Wyoming

Interstate 80
- Dwight D. Eisenhower Highway; Purple Heart Trail
- I-80 highlighted in red

Route information
- Maintained by WYDOT
- Length: 402.76 mi (648.18 km)
- Existed: June 29, 1956–present
- Tourist routes: Lincoln Highway
- NHS: Entire route

Major junctions
- West end: I-80 / US 189 at the Utah state line in Evanston
- US 189 near Evanston; US 30 near Granger; US 191 in Rock Springs; US 287 in Rawlins; US 287 in Laramie; I-25 / US 87 near Cheyenne; I-180 / US 85 in Cheyenne
- East end: I-80 at the Nebraska state line in Pine Bluffs

Location
- Country: United States
- State: Wyoming
- Counties: Uinta, Sweetwater, Carbon, Albany, Laramie

Highway system
- Interstate Highway System; Main; Auxiliary; Suffixed; Business; Future; Wyoming State Highway System; Interstate; US; State
← WYO 78	→ US 85

Interstate 80 (I-80) is a part of the Interstate Highway System that runs from San Francisco, California, to Teaneck, New Jersey. In Wyoming, the Interstate Highway runs 402.76 miles (648.18 km) from the Utah state line near Evanston east to the Nebraska state line in Pine Bluffs. I-80 connects Cheyenne, Wyoming's capital and largest city, with several smaller cities along the southern tier of Wyoming, including Evanston, Green River, Rock Springs, Rawlins, and Laramie. The highway also connects those cities with Salt Lake City to the west and Omaha to the east. In Cheyenne, I-80 intersects I-25 and has Wyoming's only auxiliary Interstate, I-180. The Interstate runs concurrently with US Highway 30 (US 30) for most of their courses in Wyoming. I-80 also has shorter concurrencies with US 189 near Evanston, US 191 near Rock Springs, and US 287 and Wyoming Highway 789 (WYO 789) near Rawlins. The Interstate has business loops through all six cities along its course as well as a loop serving Fort Bridger and Lyman east of Evanston.

== Route description ==
=== Evanston to Rock Springs ===
I-80 enters Uinta County concurrent with US 189 from Summit County, Utah, west of Evanston, the county seat of Uinta County. The Interstate parallels the Union Pacific Railroad's Evanston Subdivision rail line to Yellow Creek, east of which the railroad parallels the creek northeast, and the highway heads east into the city of Evanston. I-80 Business (I-80 Bus.) and US 189 Bus. split northeast onto Harrison Drive. I-80 has an interchange with WYO 150 (Front Street) just south of downtown Evanston and crosses over the railroad line and the Bear River shortly before the business routes (which use Bear River Drive) rejoin the Interstate on the eastern edge of the city. I-80 and US 189 continue east through interchanges with Painter Road and Divide Road before the US Highway splits northeast toward Kemmerer.

I-80 continues east through interchanges with Coal and Bar Hat roads and crosses over the Union Pacific Railroad rail line just west of the Leroy Road interchange. The highway has more minor junctions with French, Bigelow, and Union roads before I-80 Bus. splits southeast toward Fort Bridger. The stretch of I-80 between mile markers 6 - 28 is known as the Three Sisters, which some refer to as the "Highway to Heaven" because of an optical illusion that makes it seem that the road is reaching toward the sky. I-80 parallels Blacks Fork of the Green River through interchanges with WYO 412 and WYO 414 north of Mountain View and WYO 413 north of Lyman before crossing over the river. The Interstate crosses over Smiths Fork, a tributary of Blacks Fork, before I-80 Bus. rejoins the mainline. I-80 has a junction with Church Butte Road before entering Sweetwater County. The highway meets the western end of WYO 374 south of Granger and has a trumpet interchange with US 30, which joins the Interstate in the first of several concurrencies east to Nebraska. A second segment of WYO 374 begins at the first interchange east of US 30 that serves Little America.

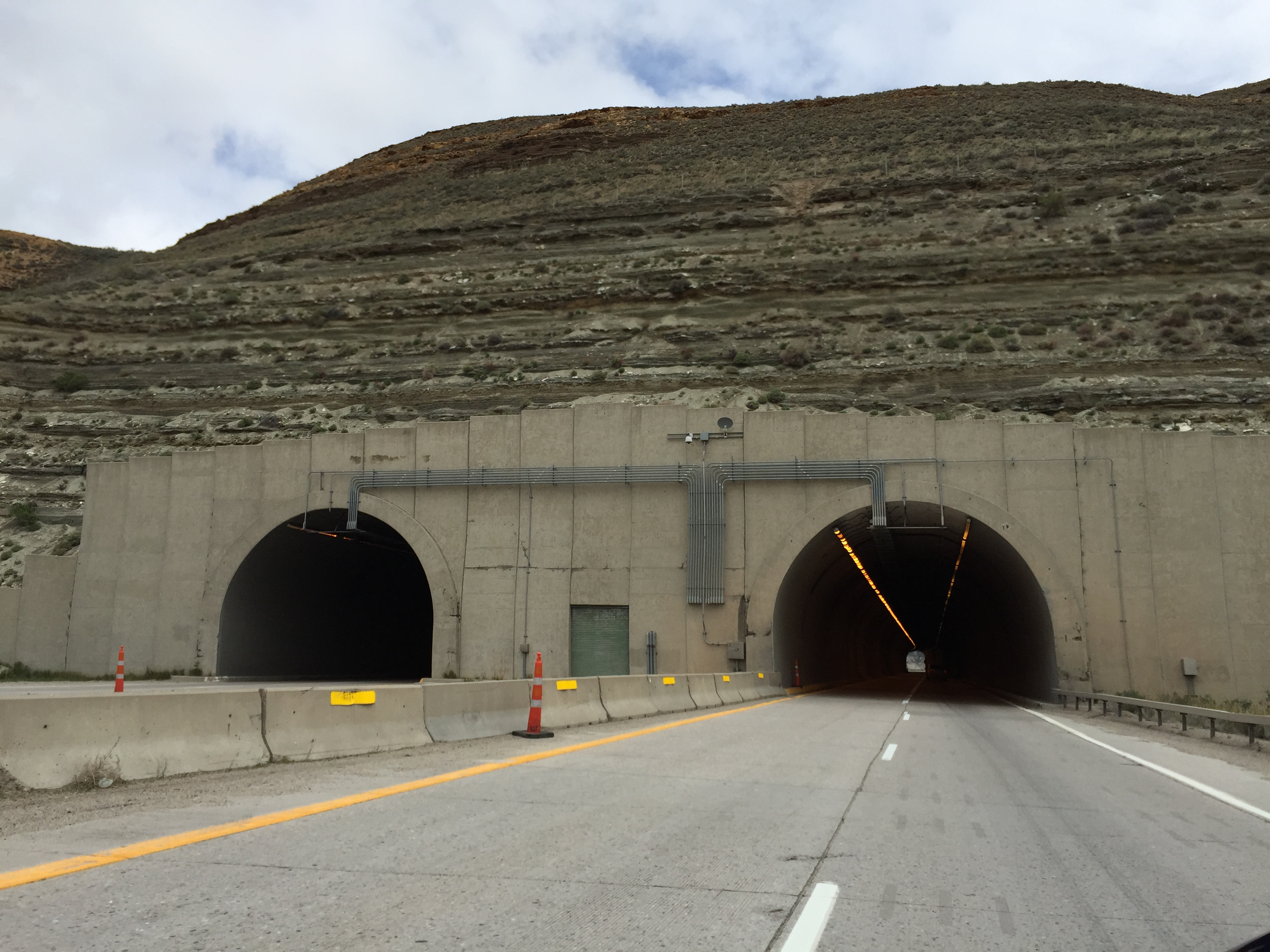
Green River Tunnel in Green River, one of three sets of tunnels along the Interstate from California to New Jersey

I-80 and US 30 parallel WYO 374 through a junction with Westvaco Road, across Blacks Fork again, and across the railroad before an interchange with WYO 374 and WYO 372. The Interstate has an interchange with Covered Wagon Road just west of its crossing of the Green River at James Town. I-80 and US 30 parallel the river and WYO 374 to the city of Green River, the county seat of Sweetwater County. The highway has trumpet interchanges with I-80 Bus. and US 30 Bus. on either side of the city; between the interchanges, the Interstate passes through the dual Green River Tunnel. The business route connects I-80 with WYO 530 (Uinta Drive). East of town, the highways follow Bitter Creek along the southern flank of White Mountain. US 191 joins I-80 and US 30 at Purple Sage; the three highways continue into the city of Rock Springs. I-80 Bus. and US 30 Bus. split east onto Dewar Drive. The mainline Interstate has partial cloverleaf interchanges with College Drive, which serves Western Wyoming Community College, and Elk Street, which US 191 joins to head north. The business routes, here named Pilot Butte Avenue, rejoin I-80 and US 30 on the east side of the city.

=== Rock Springs to Laramie ===
I-80 and US 30 continue east from Rock Springs parallel to the Union Pacific Railroad's Rawlins Subdivision and Bitter Creek. The Interstate has interchanges with WYO 370, which leads south to Southwest Wyoming Regional Airport; WYO 371, which heads north toward Superior; and WYO 372 at Point of Rocks. At Point of Rocks, I-80 and US 30 veer away from the railroad and Bitter Creek and cross the Red Desert. Within the desert, the Interstate has interchanges with a string of minor roads: Black Butte Road, Red Hill Road, Bitter Creek Road, Patrick Draw Road, Table Rock Road, Bar X Road, BLM Road, GL Road, Tipton Road, an exit simply labelled Red Desert, and Rasmussen Road. The only place of significance within this stretch is Table Rock, where the highway rejoins the railroad and enters the Great Divide Basin, an endorheic basin between two branches of the Continental Divide. I-80 and US 30 pass by the only town in the basin, Wamsutter, which is accessed by an interchange with Kelly Street. The freeway has a junction with Continental Divide Road and an interchange with WYO 789, which joins the Interstate eastbound.

I-80, US 30, and WYO 789 intersect Riner Road before entering Carbon County. The freeway continues through minor interchanges with Daley, Knobs, Hadsell, and Johnson roads; the freeway leaves the Great Divide Basin and enters the Mississippi River watershed west of Hadsell Road. WYO 789, I-80 Bus., and US 30 Bus. split from I-80 and US 30 at the west end of the city of Rawlins, the county seat of Carbon County. The Interstate crosses over the Rawlins Subdivision rail line and has an interchange with WYO 71 (Higley Boulevard). I-80 and US 30 cross back to the north side of the railroad and have a trumpet interchange with the two business routes and US 287, which joins the freeway heading east from Rawlins; WYO 76 splits east from the eastbound loop of the interchange. The Interstate has a trumpet interchange with Lincoln Avenue at the west end of Sinclair, then crosses over the railroad and WYO 76. I-80 and the two US Highways meet the eastern end of WYO 76 east of Sinclair. The three highways cross the North Platte River just east of the Fort Steele interchange.

US 30 and US 287 diverge from I-80 southwest of Hanna; WYO 130 heads south from the same interchange. I-80 continue east along the northern edge of the Medicine Bow Mountains and has junctions with Peterson Road and WYO 72, then crosses the Medicine Bow River. The Interstate continues through interchanges with Elk Mountain Medicine Bow Road, Wagonhound Road, and WYO 13 at Arlington, where the freeway crosses Rock Creek. I-80 intersects Cooper Cove Road before entering Albany County. The Interstate has interchanges with Quealy Dome Road and WYO 12 (Herrick Lane) around its crossing of the Little Laramie River. I-80 passes along the southern edge of Bamforth National Wildlife Refuge before entering Laramie, the county seat of Albany County. The freeway enters the city from the north, and I-80 Bus. splits east along Curtis Street. I-80 has interchanges with WYO 130 and WYO 230 (Snowy Range Road) and with US 287 (3rd Street) and crossings of the Laramie River and the Union Pacific Railroad's Laramie Subdivision as it curves east. The Interstate receives its business route and US 30 at a trumpet interchange on the eastern edge of the city.

A book, Snow Chi Minh Trail: The History of Interstate 80 between Laramie and Walcott Junction, was published by the Wyoming State Historical Society in 2017 describing the dangerous history of winter travel on the 77-mile (124 km) stretch of I-80 between exit 235 (near Rawlins and Hanna) and Laramie. Due to the numerous winter closures along this stretch, the Wyoming Department of Transportation (WYDOT) has proposed rerouting the highway to the north along US 30.

=== Laramie to Pine Bluffs ===
East of Laramie, I-80 and US 30 head southeast and cross the Laramie Mountains. The two highways reach their national high point at Sherman Summit, where they have an interchange with WYO 210 (Happy Jack Road). I-80 and US 30 have interchanges with Vedauwoo and Buford roads, the latter at the settlement of Buford just before the freeway enters Laramie County. The Interstate and US Highways rejoin the railroad and pass through minor junctions with Remount, Harriman, and Warren roads. I-80 and US 30 meet the western end of WYO 225 (Otto Road), which they parallel east to Cheyenne. The two highways have an interchange with WYO 222 (Roundtop Road) just west of a three-ramp partial cloverleaf interchange with the eastern end of WYO 225 (Otto Road) and the western end of I-80 Bus. (Lincolnway), onto which US 30 exits. The missing movement from the surface highway to eastbound I-80 is made via the business route's nearby interchange with I-25 and US 87.

I-80 continues east across the Union Pacific Railroad to a full cloverleaf interchange with I-25 and US 87, where the highway enters the city of Cheyenne, the county seat and state capital. The Interstate crosses over a BNSF Railway line and has a diamond interchange with US 85 and the southern end of I-180, a non-freeway spur into downtown Cheyenne. East of I-180, I-80 receives the eastern end of its business route at its junction with WYO 212 (College Drive). East of its interchange with Campstool Road, the freeway leaves the city of Cheyenne and collects the eastern end of US 30 (Archer Boulevard). I-80 and US 30 have interchanges serving Hillsdale and Egbert around a junction with WYO 213 and WYO 214, which serve Burns and Carpenter, respectively. I-80 and US 30 reapproach the Union Pacific Railroad's Sidney Subdivision east of Burns and parallel it to Pine Bluffs, the easternmost town in Wyoming. There, US 30 splits north and immediately meets the southern terminus of WYO 215. At the eastern town limit of Pine Bluffs, I-80 enters Kimball County, Nebraska.

== History ==
The last major section of I-80 in Wyoming was completed on Saturday, October 3, 1970. Just four days later, a snowstorm shut down the highway. As a result, the 77-mile (124 km) stretch of I-80 between Rawlins and Laramie was nicknamed the Snow Chi Minh Trail, as its harsh conditions evoked the North Vietnamese trail system used for infiltration into South Vietnam.

== Exit list ==
County	Location	mi	km	Exit	Destinations	Notes
Uinta		0.000	0.000		I-80 west (US 189 south) – Salt Lake City	Continuation into Utah
Uinta	Evanston	3.453	5.557	3	I-80 BL east / US 189 Bus. north to WYO 89 (Harrison Drive)	Access to Evanston-Uinta County Airport via Wasatch Road
Uinta	Evanston	5.263	8.470	5	WYO 89 north (Front Street) / WYO 150	
Uinta	Evanston	6.257	10.070	6	I-80 BL / US 189 Bus. (Bear River Drive) to WYO 89	Access to Rest Area at Bear River State Park
Uinta		10.683	17.193	10	Painter Road	
Uinta		13.862	22.309	13	Divide Road	
Uinta		18.293	29.440	18	US 189 north – Kemmerer	East end of US 189 overlap
Uinta		21.751	35.005	21	Coal Road	
Uinta		23.120	37.208	23	Bar Hat Road	
Uinta		23.906	38.473	24	Leroy Road	
Uinta		28.713	46.209	28	French Road	
Uinta		30.398	48.921	30	Bigelow Road	
Uinta		33.182	53.401	33	Union Road	
Uinta		34.741	55.910	34	I-80 BL east – Fort Bridger	
Uinta		39.896	64.206	39	WYO 412 north / WYO 414 south – Carter, Mountain View	
Uinta		41.987	67.572	41	WYO 413 south – Lyman, Rest Area	
Uinta		48.303	77.736	48	I-80 BL west – Lyman, Fort Bridger	
Uinta		53.306	85.788	53	Church Butte Road	
Sweetwater		61.591	99.121	61	Cedar Mountain Road (WYO 374) – Granger	Western terminus of unsigned segment of WYO 374
Sweetwater	Granger Junction	66.120	106.410	66	US 30 west – Kemmerer, Pocatello	West end of US 30 overlap
Sweetwater	Little America	68.972	111.000	68	WYO 374 east – Little America	Western terminus of WYO 374
Sweetwater		72.296	116.349	72	Westvaco Road	
Sweetwater	James Town	83.007	133.587	83	WYO 372 (La Barge Road) / WYO 374	
Sweetwater	James Town	85.697	137.916	85	Covered Wagon Road	
Sweetwater	Green River	89.445	143.948	89	I-80 BL east / US 30 Bus. east to WYO 530 – Green River	
Sweetwater	Green River	90.106– 90.322	145.012– 145.359	Green River Tunnel		
Sweetwater	Green River	91.532	147.306	91	I-80 BL west / US 30 Bus. west to WYO 530 – Green River	
Sweetwater	Purple Sage	99.138	159.547	99	US 191 south (East Flaming Gorge Road)	West end of US 191 overlap
Sweetwater	Rock Springs	101	163	101	Interchange Road	New diamond interchange opened in 2023
Sweetwater	Rock Springs	102.358	164.729	102	I-80 BL (Dewar Drive) / US 30 Bus. east	
Sweetwater	Rock Springs	103.819	167.080	103	College Drive	
Sweetwater	Rock Springs	104.825	168.699	104	US 191 north (Elk Street)	East end of US 191 overlap
Sweetwater	Rock Springs	107.056	172.290	107	I-80 BL / US 30 Bus. (Pilot Butte Avenue) to WYO 430	
Sweetwater		111.161	178.896	111	Baxter Road (WYO 370 south) / Airport Road	Serves Rock Springs–Sweetwater County Airport
Sweetwater		122.272	196.778	122	WYO 371 north – Superior	
Sweetwater	Point of Rocks	130.840	210.567	130	Point of Rocks	Former WYO 377
Sweetwater		136.958	220.413	136	Black Butte Road	
Sweetwater		139.509	224.518	139	Red Hill Road	
Sweetwater		142.170	228.800	142	Bitter Creek Road	
Sweetwater		146.848	236.329	146	Patrick Draw Road	
Sweetwater	Table Rock	150.807	242.700	150	Table Rock Road	
Sweetwater	Table Rock	152.455	245.353	152	Bar X Road	
Sweetwater	Table Rock	154.055	247.927	154	BLM Road	Closed in 2011
Sweetwater	Table Rock	156.025	251.098	156	GL Road	
Sweetwater	Table Rock	158.545	255.153	158	Tipton Road	
Sweetwater		165.582	266.478	165	Red Desert	
Sweetwater		166.920	268.632	166	Booster Road	Closed in 2010
Sweetwater		168.940	271.883	168	Frewen Road	Closed in 2010
Sweetwater		170.676	274.676	170	Rasmussen Road	
Sweetwater	Wamsutter	173.413	279.081	173	Kelly Street – Wamsutter	
Sweetwater		184.288	296.583	184	Continental Divide Road	
Sweetwater		187.204	301.276	187	WYO 789 south – Creston Junction, Baggs	West end of WYO 789 overlap
Sweetwater		196.157	315.684	196	Riner Road	
Carbon		201.164	323.742	201	Daley Road	
Carbon		204.175	328.588	204	Knobs Road	
Carbon		206.182	331.818	206	Hadsell Road	
Carbon		209.459	337.092	209	Johnson Road	
Carbon	Rawlins	211.780	340.827	211	I-80 BL / US 30 Bus. east / WYO 789 north to US 287 – Rawlins	East end of WYO 789 overlap
Carbon	Rawlins	214.111	344.578	214	WYO 71 south (Higley Boulevard)	
Carbon	Rawlins	215.570	346.926	215	I-80 BL / US 30 Bus. west / US 287 north to WYO 789 – Rawlins	West end of US 287 overlap
Carbon	Sinclair	219.594	353.402	219	Lincoln Avenue – Sinclair	
Carbon	Sinclair	221.926	357.155	221	WYO 76 west – Sinclair	
Carbon		228.341	367.479	228	Fort Steele	
Carbon	Walcott Junction	235.280	378.646	235	US 30 east / US 287 south / WYO 130 east – Walcott, Saratoga	East end of US 30 / US 287 overlap
Carbon		238.150	383.265	238	Peterson Road	
Carbon		255.602	411.352	255	WYO 72 – Hanna, Elk Mountain	
Carbon		260.232	418.803	260	County Road 402	
Carbon		267.186	429.994	267	Wagonhound Road	
Carbon	Arlington	272.056	437.832	272	WYO 13 north – Arlington	
Carbon		279.859	450.389	279	Cooper Cove Road	
Albany		290.438	467.415	290	Quealy Dome Road	
Albany		297.663	479.042	297	WYO 12 (Herrick Lane)	
Albany	Laramie	310.452	499.624	310	I-80 BL east (Curtis Street)	
Albany	Laramie	311.756	501.723	311	WYO 130 / WYO 230 (Snowy Range Road)	
Albany	Laramie	313.191	504.032	313	US 287 (Third Street) – Fort Collins	
Albany	Laramie	316.702	509.682	316	I-80 BL / US 30 west (Grand Avenue)	West end of US 30 overlap
Albany	Sherman Summit	323.049	519.897	323	WYO 210 east (Happy Jack Road)	Highest point on I-80
Albany		329.316	529.983	329	Vedauwoo Road	
Albany	Buford	335.106	539.301	335	Buford Road – Buford	
Laramie		339.317	546.078	339	Remount Road	
Laramie		342.560	551.297	342	Harriman Road (former WYO 218)	
Laramie		345.501	556.030	345	Warren Road	
Laramie		348.363	560.636	348	WYO 225 east (Otto Road)	Former US 30 east
Laramie		357.680	575.630	357	WYO 222 (Roundtop Road)	
Laramie		358.076	576.267	358	I-80 BL / US 30 east (W. Lincolnway) / WYO 225 west	East end of US 30 overlap; no eastbound entrance; WYO 225 (Otto Road) is former US 30 west
Laramie		359.599	578.718	359	I-25 / US 87 – Casper, Fort Collins	Signed as exits 359A (south) and 359C (north); I-25 exits 8B&D
Laramie	Cheyenne	362.037	582.642	362	I-180 north / US 85 (Central Avenue / I-25 BL / US 87 Bus.) – Greeley	Signalized interchange; southern terminus of I-180
Laramie	Cheyenne	364.000	585.801	364	I-80 BL west / WYO 212 (College Drive) to E. Lincolnway (US 30)	
Laramie	Cheyenne	367.424	591.312	367	Campstool Road	
Laramie		370.394	596.091	370	US 30 west – Archer	West end of US 30 overlap
Laramie		377.353	607.291	377	Hillsdale	
Laramie		386.389	621.833	386	WYO 213 north / WYO 214 south – Burns, Carpenter	
Laramie		391.385	629.873	391	Egbert	
Laramie	Pine Bluffs	401.456	646.081	401	US 30 east (I-80 BL east) to WYO 215 – Pine Bluffs	East end of US 30 overlap; access to Pine Bluffs Rest Area
Laramie	Pine Bluffs	402.780	648.212		I-80 east – Sidney	Continuation into Nebraska
1.000 mi = 1.609 km; 1.000 km = 0.621 mi: Closed/former; Concurrency terminus

== Related routes ==
I-80 has eight Interstate business routes in Wyoming. In addition, there is also one auxiliary Interstate in the state, I-180 in Cheyenne.

== See also ==
- I-80 History
- Interstate Highway History

Interstate 80
Previous state: Utah	Wyoming	Next state: Nebraska
