= Table Rock, Wyoming =

Ghost town in Sweetwater County, Wyoming, United States

- Ghost town
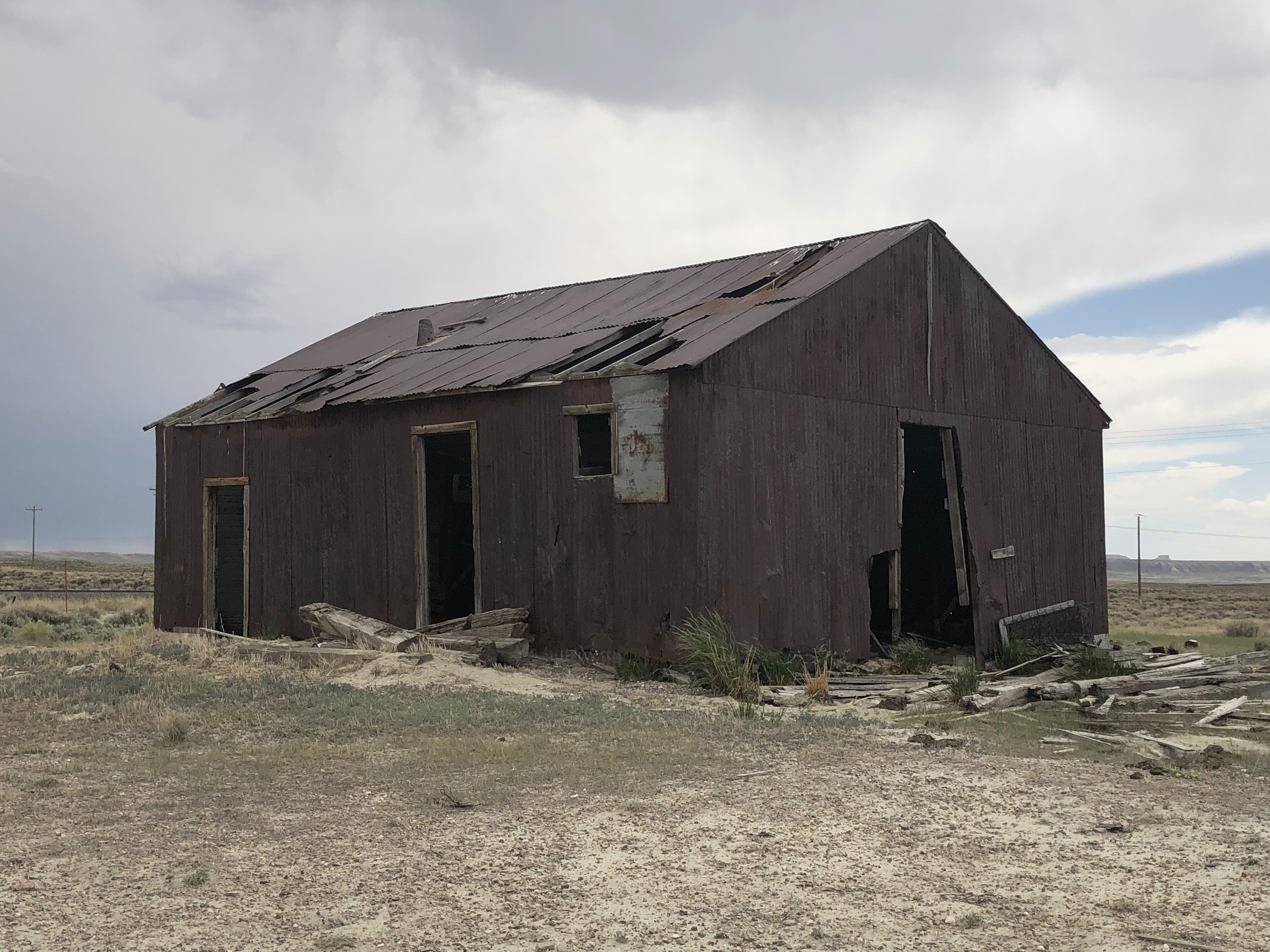
- Abandoned building in Table Rock, Wyoming, June 2021

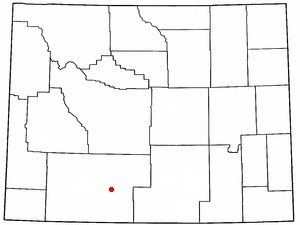
- Location of Table Rock, Wyoming
- Coordinates: 41°37′34″N 108°24′08″W
- Country: United States
- State: Wyoming
- County: Sweetwater
- Closed: July 2003

Area
  - Total: 6.8 sq mi (17.6 km^{2})
  - Land: 6.8 sq mi (17.6 km^{2})
  - Water: 0 sq mi (0.0 km^{2})
- Elevation: 6,847 ft (2,087 m)

Population (2010)
  - Total: 0
- Time zone: UTC-7 (Mountain (MST))
  - Summer (DST): UTC-6 (MDT)
- Area code: 307
- FIPS code: 56-75355
- GNIS feature ID: 2410045

Table Rock is a ghost town in Sweetwater County, Wyoming, United States. The former town is part of a census-designated place. In the 2000 census, it had a population of 82, but the 2010 census reported a population of 0.

== Geography ==
Table Rock lies along Interstate 80 in the Red Desert Basin, between Rock Springs and Wamsutter.

According to the United States Census Bureau, Table Rock has a total area of 6.8 square miles (17.6 km^{2}), all land.

== History ==
Table Rock was built in the late 1970s by Colorado Interstate Gas (CIG) as a company town, to house workers during an area boom and housing shortage. It was built just north of the company's natural gas processing plant. CIG provided employees three- or four-bedroom homes free of charge and built a community center. The village began to decline after El Paso Corp. acquired CIG in 2001. In 2003, the plant and town were bought by Anadarko Petroleum, which then decided not to operate the village. Table Rock was closed in July 2003. The housing units were sold to real estate developers, and some of the houses were moved to Rock Springs.

The remaining homes were demolished in late August 2011, leaving the community center as the only structure standing on the village site, and it was scheduled to be moved.

== Demographics ==
The census of 2000 did not separate the town from the larger CDP, but there were 82 people, 32 households, and 23 families residing in the entire CDP. The population density was 12.0 people per square mile (4.6/km^{2}). There were 55 housing units at an average density of 8.1/sq mi (3.1/km^{2}). The racial makeup of the CDP was 86.59% White, 1.22% Native American, 1.22% Asian, 3.66% from other races, and 7.32% from two or more races. Hispanic or Latino of any race were 10.98% of the population.

There were 32 households, out of which 43.8% had children under the age of 18 living with them, 65.6% were married couples living together, 3.1% had a female householder with no husband present, and 28.1% were non-families. 28.1% of all households were made up of individuals, and none had someone living alone who was 65 years of age or older. The average household size was 2.56 and the average family size was 3.17.

In the CDP the population was spread out, with 32.9% under the age of 18, 12.2% from 18 to 24, 30.5% from 25 to 44, 24.4% from 45 to 64. The median age was 29 years. For every 100 females, there were 121.6 males. For every 100 females age 18 and over, there were 150.0 males.

The median income for a household in the CDP was $48,750, and the median income for a family was $48,750. Males had a median income of $41,000 versus $11,250 for females. The per capita income for the CDP was $12,775. None of the population or the families were below the poverty line.

== Education ==
The CDP is within the Sweetwater County School District Number One.

== See also ==
- List of ghost towns in Wyoming
