= Wyoming Highway 370 =

State highway in Wyoming, United States

Wyoming Highway 370
- Baxter Road; Airport Road
- WYO 370 highlighted in red

Route information
- Maintained by WYDOT
- Length: 4.63 mi (7.45 km)

Major junctions
- West end: I-80 / US 30; CR 43 / near Rock Springs
- East end: Rock Springs - Sweetwater County Airport

Location
- Country: United States
- State: Wyoming
- Counties: Sweetwater

Highway system
- Wyoming State Highway System; Interstate; US; State
← WYO 354	→ WYO 371

Wyoming Highway 370 (WYO 370) is a 4.63-mile-long (7.45 km) unmarked state highway that runs east of Rock Springs, Wyoming from exit 111 of Interstate 80 (I-80) and U.S. Route 30 (US 30) to the Rock Springs - Sweetwater County Airport.

== Route description ==
Wyoming Highway 370 runs from an interchange with Interstate 80/U.S. Route 30 at Exit 111 that it shares with the south end of Sweetwater County Route 43 (Baxter Road), that travels north from there. Exit 111 is signed only as "Airport Road" from the Interstate, with one sign indicating "Baxter Road" along the interstate. There are no WYO 370 shields along the Interstate. WYO 370 travels east to the Rock Springs Regional Airport.

The airport sits on top of a large bluff, and Highway 370 travels in wide arcs up to the top of the hill. The location of the airport on a bluff makes this one of the most interesting airport approaches by airplane. Milepost 0.00 is at I-80/US 30, there is a Union Pacific Railroad Separation at Milepost 0.66. The airport is located at the end of the highway at Milepost 4.66.

== Major intersections ==
The entire route is in Rock Springs, Sweetwater County.

mi	km	Destinations	Notes
0.00	0.00	I-80 / US 30 CR 43 north (Baxter Road)	Western terminus of WYO 370; Exit 111 (I-80/US 30)
4.63	7.45	Rock Springs–Sweetwater County Airport	Eastern terminus of WYO 370
1.000 mi = 1.609 km; 1.000 km = 0.621 mi
