= Wyoming Highway 371 =

State highway in Wyoming, United States

Wyoming Highway 371
- Superior Road
- WYO 371 highlighted in red

Route information
- Maintained by WYDOT
- Length: 7.30 mi (11.75 km)
- Existed: June 1971–present

Major junctions
- South end: I-80 / US 30
- North end: Upper Superior Road in Superior

Location
- Country: United States
- State: Wyoming
- Counties: Sweetwater

Highway system
- Wyoming State Highway System; Interstate; US; State
← WYO 370	→ WYO 372

Wyoming Highway 371 (WYO 371) is a 7.3-mile-long (11.7 km) north-south Wyoming State Road in Sweetwater County that provides travel to the old coal mining town of Superior.

== Route description ==
Wyoming Highway 371 begins its southern end at exit 122 of Interstate 80/U.S. Route 30 south of Superior. From there, WYO 371 travels north and passes through the town of Superior between Mileposts 6.78 and 7.16. Not long after, Wyoming Highway 371 ends after 7.3 miles at Upper Superior Road.

== Major intersections ==
The entire route is in Sweetwater County.

Location	mi	km	Destinations	Notes
	0.00	0.00	I-80 / US 30	Southern terminus of WYO 371; Exit 122 (I-80/US 30)
Superior	7.30	11.75	Upper Superior Road	Northern terminus of WYO 371
1.000 mi = 1.609 km; 1.000 km = 0.621 mi
