= Wyoming Highway 377 =

Former state highway in Wyoming, United States

Wyoming Highway 377
- Point of Rocks Road
- WYO 377 highlighted in red

Route information
- Maintained by WYDOT
- Length: 1.96 mi (3.15 km)

Major junctions
- West end: I-80 / US 30 in Point of Rocks
- East end: 9 Mile Road near Jim Bridger Power Plant

Location
- Country: United States
- State: Wyoming
- Counties: Sweetwater

Highway system
- Wyoming State Highway System; Interstate; US; State
← WYO 376	→ WYO 387
← WYO 28	→ WYO 30

Wyoming Highway 377 (WYO 377) was a short 1.96-mile-long (3.2 km) Wyoming state road in central Sweetwater County that served the community of Point of Rocks and the Jim Bridger Power Plant. It was decommissioned in 2017.

== Route description ==
Wyoming Highway 377 began at exit 130 of Interstate 80/US 30 in Point of Rocks, a Census-designated place located east of Rock Springs. WYO 377 traveled eastward along the north side of Interstate 80/US Route 30, which it paralleled. At just under 2 miles, Highway 377 ended, though the roadway continued north, as 9 Mile Road, providing access to and from the Jim Bridger Power Station.

== History ==
Highway 377 was the former alignment of US 30 (Lincoln Highway) through this area and paralleled Interstate 80 which carries the present day routing of US 30.

== Major intersections ==
The entire route was in Sweetwater County.

Location	mi	km	Destinations	Notes
Point of Rocks	0.00	0.00	I-80 / US 30	Exit 130 on I-80
	1.96	3.15	9 Mile Road	Continuation beyond eastern terminus
1.000 mi = 1.609 km; 1.000 km = 0.621 mi
