= Wyoming Highway 225 =

State highway in Wyoming, United States

Wyoming Highway 225
- Otto Road
- WYO 225 highlighted in red

Route information
- Maintained by WYDOT
- Length: 11.21 mi (18.04 km)

Major junctions
- West end: I-80 / US 30
- East end: I-80 BL / I-80 / US 30 west of Cheyenne

Location
- Country: United States
- State: Wyoming
- Counties: Laramie

Highway system
- Wyoming State Highway System; Interstate; US; State
← WYO 224	→ WYO 226
← WYO 28	→ WYO 30

Wyoming Highway 225 (WYO 225) is a 11.21-mile-long (18.04 km) state highway, named Otto Road, located in southwestern Laramie County west of Cheyenne, in the U.S. state of Wyoming.

== Route description ==
Wyoming Highway 225 begins its western end at exit 348 of Interstate 80/US 30 east of Granite Canon. WYO 225 heads east toward Cheyenne, roughly paralleling I-80/US 30 to the south, as it was the former routing of the latter. Reaching the western outskirts of Cheyenne, the southern terminus of Wyoming Highway 222 (Roundtop Road) is intersected, which heads north to F.E. Warren AFB and also provides access to exit 357 of the interstate. Shortly thereafter, WYO 225 reaches its eastern end at exit 358 of I-80/US 30; however no access to the interstate is provided from westbound WYO 225. WYO 225 turns into I-80 Business and US 30 as US 30 leaves I-80 and joins the I-80 Business Loop west into Cheyenne, named West Lincolnway.

== History ==
Highway 225 is the original routing of U.S. Route 30 before Interstate 80 was built and the US 30 designation transferred to the Interstate. WYDOT defines the route internally as Main Line Route 56B.

== Major intersections ==
The entire route is in Laramie County.

Location	mi	km	Destinations	Notes
	0.00	0.00	I-80 / US 30 – Laramie, Cheyenne	Western terminus; exit 348 on I-80
	9.65	15.53	WYO 222 to I-80	Southern terminus of WYO 222
	11.21	18.04	I-80 BL east (Lincolnway) / I-80 west / US 30	Eastern terminus; exit 358 on I-80; no access to I-80 east; highway continues as I-80 Bus./US 30 east (Lincolnway)
1.000 mi = 1.609 km; 1.000 km = 0.621 mi
