= North Rock Springs, Wyoming =

- CDP
- Location within the state of Wyoming
- Coordinates: 41°40′14″N 109°15′22″W
- Country: United States
- State: Wyoming
- County: Sweetwater

Area
  - Total: 14.78 sq mi (38.3 km^{2})
  - Land: 14.75 sq mi (38.2 km^{2})
  - Water: 0.02 sq mi (0.052 km^{2})
- Elevation: 6,487 ft (1,977 m)

Population (2020)
  - Total: 2,439
- Time zone: UTC-7 (Mountain (MST))
  - Summer (DST): UTC-6 (MDT)
- Area code: 307
- FIPS code: 56-56700
- GNIS feature ID: 2408946

North Rock Springs is a census-designated place (CDP) in Sweetwater County, Wyoming, United States. The population was 2,439 at the 2020 census.

== Geography ==
According to the United States Census Bureau, the CDP has a total area of 14.78 square miles (38.3 km^{2}), of which 14.75 square miles (38.2 km^{2}) is land and 0.02 square mile (0.06 km^{2}) (0.16%) is water.

== Demographics ==
Historical population
Census	Pop.	Note	%±
2000	1,974		—
2010	2,207		11.8%
2020	2,439		10.5%

=== 2020 census ===
As of the 2020 census, North Rock Springs had a population of 2,439. The median age was 39.0 years. 23.9% of residents were under the age of 18 and 13.7% of residents were 65 years of age or older. For every 100 females there were 107.6 males, and for every 100 females age 18 and over there were 103.4 males age 18 and over.

75.3% of residents lived in urban areas, while 24.7% lived in rural areas.

There were 910 households in North Rock Springs, of which 33.8% had children under the age of 18 living in them. Of all households, 61.9% were married-couple households, 16.5% were households with a male householder and no spouse or partner present, and 14.0% were households with a female householder and no spouse or partner present. About 19.6% of all households were made up of individuals and 6.9% had someone living alone who was 65 years of age or older.

There were 990 housing units, of which 8.1% were vacant. The homeowner vacancy rate was 1.5% and the rental vacancy rate was 20.8%.

Racial composition as of the 2020 census
Race	Number	Percent
White	2,122	87.0%
Black or African American	6	0.2%
American Indian and Alaska Native	27	1.1%
Asian	1	0.0%
Native Hawaiian and Other Pacific Islander	0	0.0%
Some other race	96	3.9%
Two or more races	187	7.7%
Hispanic or Latino (of any race)	312	12.8%

=== 2000 census ===
As of the census of 2000, there were 1,974 people, at 698 households, and 552 families residing in the CDP. The population density was 77.5 people per square mile (29.9/km^{2}). There were 739 housing units at an average density of 29.0/sq mi (11.2/km^{2}). The racial makeup of the CDP was 92.86% White, 0.51% African American, 1.06% Native American, 0.10% Asian, 2.38% from other races, and 3.09% from two or more races. Hispanic or Latino of any race were 7.19% of the population.

There were 698 households, out of which 44.4% had children under the age of 18 living with them, 64.9% were married couples living together, 6.7% had a female householder with no husband present, and 20.8% were non-families. 16.5% of all households were made up of individuals, and 2.7% had someone living alone who was 65 years of age or older. The average household size was 2.83 and the average family size was 3.18.

In the CDP, the population was spread out, with 30.6% under the age of 18, 9.7% from 18 to 24, 30.2% from 25 to 44, 25.5% from 45 to 64, and 3.9% who were 65 years of age or older. The median age was 33 years. For every 100 females, there were 113.4 males. For every 100 females age 18 and over, there were 110.0 males.

The median income for a household in the CDP was $53,651, and the median income for a family was $55,819. Males had a median income of $45,923 versus $22,450 for females. The per capita income for the CDP was $20,029. About 5.5% of families and 8.0% of the population were below the poverty line, including 9.1% of those under age 18 and none of those age 65 or over.

== Education ==
Public education in the community of North Rock Springs is provided by Sweetwater County School District #1.
