= Sweetwater County School District Number 1 =

School district in Wyoming, United States

Address
- 3550 Foothill Blvd Rock Springs, Sweetwater, Wyoming, 82901; United States
- Coordinates: 41°59′00″N 109°25′29″W

District information
- Type: Public Coed
- Grades: K–12
- Superintendent: Dr. Joseph A. Libby
- Asst. superintendent(s): Nicole Bolton
- NCES District ID: 5605302

Students and staff
- Students: 2025–26; ~4840-4950 District

Other information
- Website: http://www.sweetwater1.org/

Sweetwater County School District #1 is a public school district based in Rock Springs, Wyoming, United States.

== Geography ==
Sweetwater County School District #1 serves the northeastern portion of Sweetwater County, including the following communities:

- Incorporated places
  - City of Rock Springs
  - Town of Superior
  - Town of Wamsutter though high school students attend Rawlins High School which is much closer.
- Census-designated places (Note: All census-designated places are unincorporated.)
  - Arrowhead Springs
  - Clearview Acres
  - Eden
  - Farson
  - North Rock Springs
  - Point of Rocks
  - Purple Sage
    - There is an area that was, of the 2000 U.S. census, defined as part of the Purple Sage CDP, but not as such in the 2010 U.S. census and beyond. Part of that area lies in Sweetwater County School District Two.
  - Reliance
  - Sweeney Ranch (former CDP, partial)
  - Table Rock
- Unincorporated places
  - Blairtown

== Schools ==
- Grades 9–12
  - Rock Springs High School
  - Black Butte High School
  - Lowell Alternative School
- Grades 7–8
  - Rock Springs Junior High School
- Grades 4–6
  - Pilot Butte Elementary School
  - Eastside Elementary School
- Grades K-3
  - Desert View Elementary School
  - Northpark Elementary School
  - Sage Elementary School
  - Walnut Elementary School
- '"Pre-K/Early Education'"
  - Overland Elementary Early Childhood Education Center
- Grades K-8
  - Desert School (Wamsutter, WY)
    - Middle School (7–8)
    - Elementary School (K-6)
- Grades K-12
  - Farson-Eden School
    - High School (9–12)
    - Middle School (6–8)

== School Closures ==
  - Lowell Elementary School - Closed in 2001; currently being used for alternative school
  - Roosevelt Elementary School - Closed in 2001; currently winterized
  - Yellowstone Elementary School - Closed in 2002; currently occupied by Boys and Girls Club of Sweetwater County
  - East Junior High School - Closed in 2012; demolished, land being used for Eastside Elementary School
  - Lincoln Elementary School - Closed in 2017; demolished
  - Westridge Elementary School - Closed in 2021; currently being used as Northpark Elementary School campus
  - Overland Elementary School - Closed in 2021; currently being used as Overland Elementary Early Education Center
  - Washington Elementary School - Closed in 2021; vacant

== Student demographics ==
The following figures are as of October 1, 2008.

- Total District Enrollment: 4,957
- Student enrollment by gender
  - Male: 2,579 (52.03%)
  - Female: 2,378 (47.97%)
- Student enrollment by ethnicity
  - White (not Hispanic): 3,867 (78.01%)
  - Hispanic: 898 (18.12%)
  - Black (not Hispanic): 84 (1.69%)
  - American Indian or Alaskan Native: 57 (1.15%)
  - Asian or Pacific Islander: 51 (1.03%)

== See also ==
- List of school districts in Wyoming
