= Clearview Acres, Wyoming =

- Census-designated place
- Location within the state of Wyoming
- Coordinates: 41°35′03″N 109°16′48″W
- Country: United States
- State: Wyoming
- County: Sweetwater

Area
  - Total: 1.2 sq mi (3.1 km^{2})
  - Land: 1.2 sq mi (3.1 km^{2})
  - Water: 0 sq mi (0.0 km^{2})
- Elevation: 6,329 ft (1,929 m)

Population (2010)
  - Total: 795
  - Density: 660/sq mi (260/km^{2})
- Time zone: UTC-7 (Mountain (MST))
  - Summer (DST): UTC-6 (MDT)
- Area code: 307
- FIPS code: 56-15400
- GNIS feature ID: 2407632

Clearview Acres is a census-designated place (CDP) in Sweetwater County, Wyoming, United States. The population was 795 at the 2010 census.

== Geography ==
According to the United States Census Bureau, the CDP has a total area of 1.2 square miles (3.1 km^{2}), all land.

== Demographics ==
As of the census of 2000, there were 850 people, 295 households, and 228 families residing in the CDP. The population density was 713.4 people per square mile (275.8/km^{2}). There were 314 housing units at an average density of 263.6/sq mi (101.9/km^{2}). The racial makeup of the CDP was 84.35% White, 0.94% African American, 1.53% Native American, 0.12% Asian, 0.12% Pacific Islander, 7.53% from other races, and 5.41% from two or more races. Hispanic or Latino of any race were 13.88% of the population.

There were 295 households, out of which 36.6% had children under the age of 18 living with them, 65.8% were married couples living together, 5.1% had a female householder with no husband present, and 22.4% were non-families. 16.6% of all households were made up of individuals, and 3.7% had someone living alone who was 65 years of age or older. The average household size was 2.82 and the average family size was 3.17.

In the CDP, the population was spread out, with 31.9% under the age of 18, 7.1% from 18 to 24, 30.6% from 25 to 44, 26.5% from 45 to 64, and 4.0% who were 65 years of age or older. The median age was 33 years. For every 100 females, there were 103.8 males. For every 100 females age 18 and over, there were 106.8 males.

The median income for a household in the CDP was $42,120, and the median income for a family was $45,750. Males had a median income of $31,579 versus $17,250 for females. The per capita income for the CDP was $17,507. About 5.7% of families and 11.0% of the population were below the poverty line, including 19.3% of those under age 18 and 10.0% of those age 65 or over.

== Education ==
Public education in the community of Clearview Acres is provided by Sweetwater County School District #1.
