= Green River Tunnel =

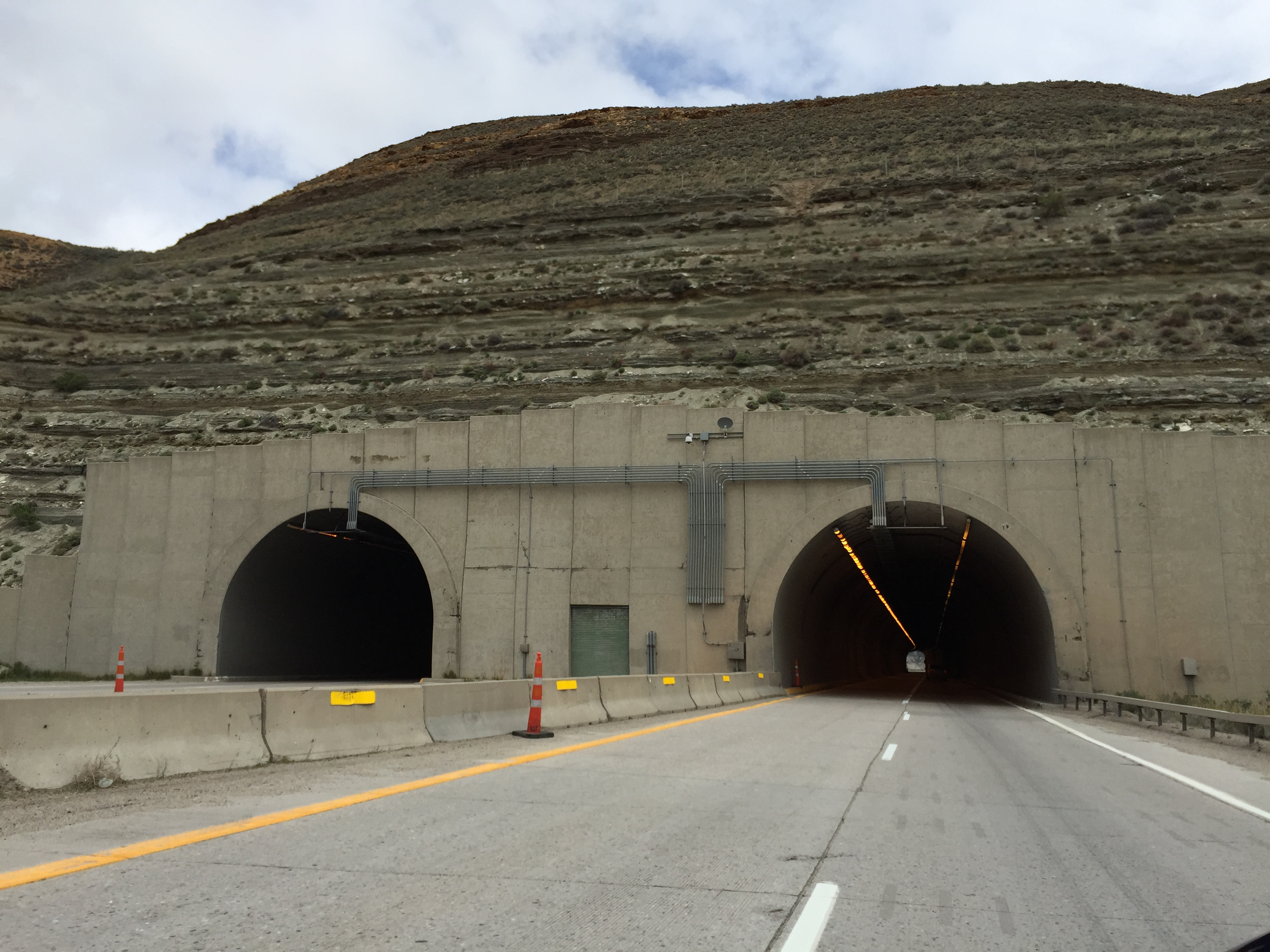
- Entrance to the Green River Tunnel from eastbound Interstate 80/U.S. Route 30, May 2015
- Interactive map of Green River Tunnel

Overview
- Location: Green River, Wyoming; United States
- Coordinates: 41°32′02″N 109°27′53″W
- Status: open
- Route: I-80 (Dwight D. Eisenhower Highway) / US 30

Operation
- Opened: October 28, 1966
- Owner: Wyoming Department of Transportation
- Traffic: Automotive
- Character: Limited access
- Toll: None

Technical
- Length: 1,138.2 ft (346.92 m)
- No. of lanes: 4 (2 each direction)
- Operating speed: 65 mph (105 km/h) (variable; temporarily reduced to 50 mph (80 km/h) westbound pending completion of repairs to the westbound bore)
- Tunnel clearance: 16 feet 4 inches (4.98 m) eastbound 16 feet 9 inches (5.11 m) westbound

The Green River Tunnel is a pair of 1,138.2-foot (346.9 m) vehicular tunnels that carry Interstate 80 (Dwight D. Eisenhower Highway)/U.S. Route 30 through Castle Rock, a sandstone ridge in Green River in Sweetwater County, Wyoming, United States. The two tunnels, one for eastbound and one for westbound traffic, opened on October 28, 1966. The tunnels run approximately from mile points 90.1 to 90.3 along the interstate.

== Rock ridge ==
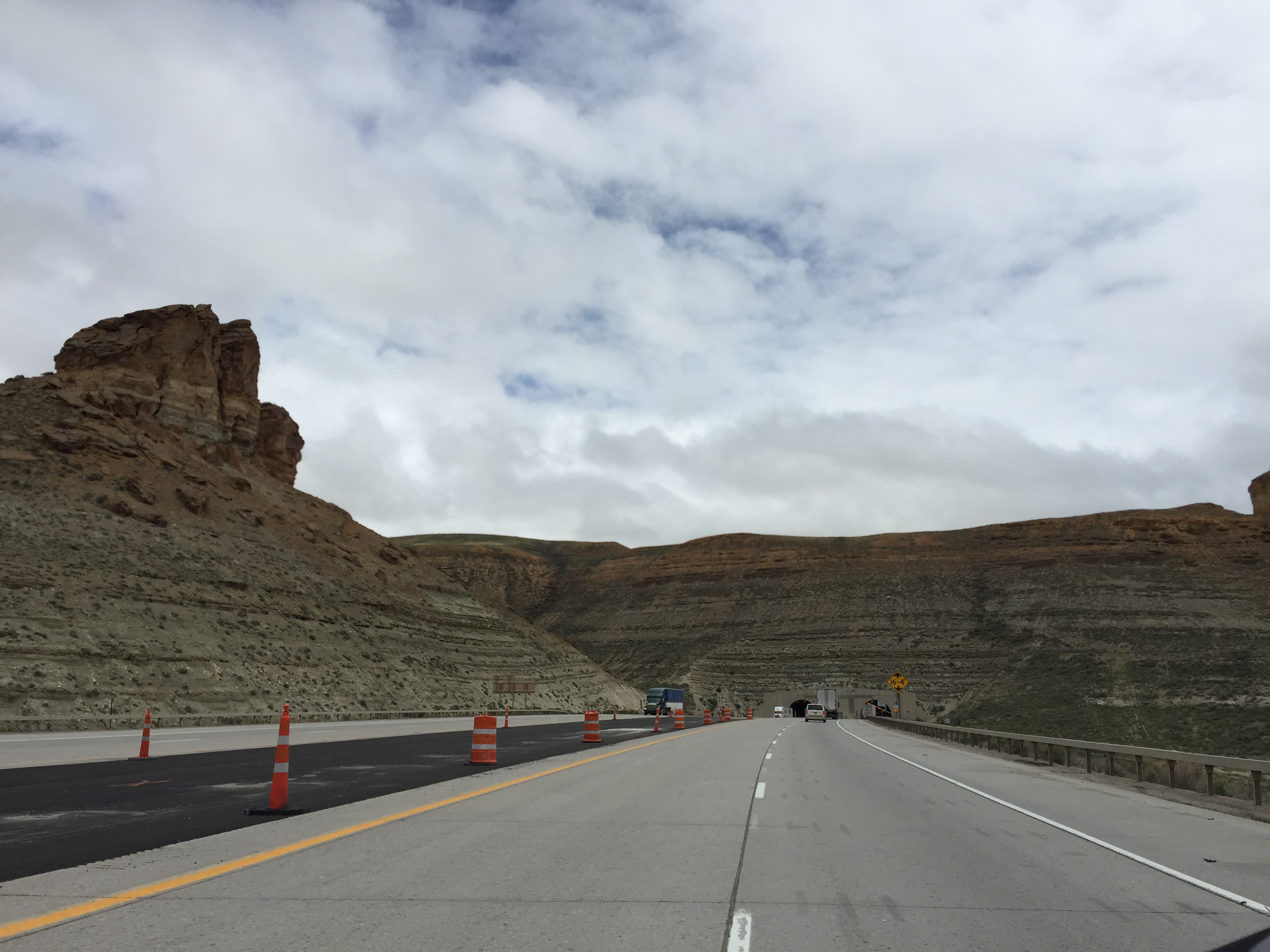
View of the rock ridge at Green River from the east, 2015

The tunnels pass through Castle Rock, a sandstone ridge formation in the Rocky Mountains. Due to the steepness of the ridge, it was not possible to build Interstate 80 across the ridge while maintaining an acceptable grade as required by Interstate Highway Standards. The Continental Divide passes through Sweetwater County.

== 2025 accident ==
On the afternoon of February 14, 2025, at least three people were killed and five others injured in a multi-vehicle crash in the tunnel. The crash resulted in the closure of the westbound bore of the tunnel, which investigators said was severely damaged. The Wyoming Department of Transportation said the crash started outside of the tunnel, where two of the fatalities occurred.

The crash was primarily concentrated around 400 feet from the eastern entrance of the westbound tunnel. In total, 26 vehicles were involved. The NTSB and WYDOT began investigating the cause of the crash. Traffic was diverted through Green River on Wyoming Highway 374. The eastbound tunnel was reconfigured to carry bidirectional traffic and reopened on February 20.

The three victims identified in the crash were 20-year-old Christopher Johnson and 22-year-old Quentin Romero of Rawlins, and 30-year-old Harmanjeet Singh of Nova Scotia, Canada.
