= Wyoming Highway 72 =

State highway in Wyoming, United States

Wyoming Highway 72
- WYO 72 highlighted in red

Route information
- Maintained by WYDOT
- Length: 15.45 mi (24.86 km)

Major junctions
- South end: CR 402 in Elk Mountain
- I-80 near Elk Mountain; US 30 / US 287 in Hanna
- North end: Adams Street in Hanna

Location
- Country: United States
- State: Wyoming
- Counties: Carbon

Highway system
- Wyoming State Highway System; Interstate; US; State
← WYO 71	→ WYO 73

Wyoming Highway 72 (WYO 72) is a 15.45-mile-long (24.86 km) Wyoming state highway in eastern-central Carbon County that travels from Elk Mountain northwest to Hanna.

== Route description ==
Highway 72 begins its south end at Carbon County Route 402 (East Main Street) in Elk Mountain. WYO 72 heads northwest out of Elk Mountain as Bridge Street and then loses the name when it leaves the town. At approximately 4 miles (6.4 km) north of Elk Mountain, Highway 72 intersects Interstate 80 at Exit 255. Highway 72 continues heading northwest towards Hanna, Wyoming, hence the road's name Hanna Road. 14.3 miles (23.0 km) north of Carbon County Route 402, Highway 72 intersects U.S. Routes 30 and 287. Highway 72 then continues north from this intersection for around 1 mile (1.6 km) as Adams Street to its northern terminus in Hanna.

Highway 72 uses two inventory control numbers. ML 412 is used for the section from Hanna to US 30 while ML 404 is used for the section from US 30 to Elk Mountain. This results in an unusual situation where mileposts overlap. ML 412 starts at milepost zero at US-30 and continues through Hanna to milepost 3.02, while ML 404 starts at milepost 1.55 from US 30 and continues to milepost 15.98 in Elk Mountain. This means that there are two mileposts for every interval between 1.55 and 3.02.

== Major intersections ==
The entire route is in Carbon County.

Location	mi	km	Destinations	Notes
Elk Mountain	0.00	0.00	CR 402	Southern terminus; to I-80
	3.71	5.97	I-80 – Laramie, Rawlins	Exit 255 on I-80
Hanna	14.30	23.01	US 30 / US 287	
Hanna	15.45	24.86	Adams Street	Northern terminus
1.000 mi = 1.609 km; 1.000 km = 0.621 mi
