= Purple Sage, Wyoming =

- Census-designated place
- Location within the state of Wyoming
- Coordinates: 41°33′05″N 109°19′13″W
- Country: United States
- State: Wyoming
- County: Sweetwater

Area
  - Total: 0.33 sq mi (0.85 km^{2})
  - Land: 0.33 sq mi (0.85 km^{2})
  - Water: 0.0 sq mi (0 km^{2})
- Elevation: 6,227 ft (1,898 m)

Population (2010)
  - Total: 535
  - Density: 1,600/sq mi (630/km^{2})
- Time zone: UTC-7 (Mountain (MST))
  - Summer (DST): UTC-6 (MDT)
- Area code: 307
- FIPS code: 56-62812
- GNIS feature ID: 2409111

Purple Sage is a census-designated place (CDP) in Sweetwater County, Wyoming, United States. The population was 535 at the 2010 census.

== Geography ==
According to the United States Census Bureau, the CDP has a total area of 0.3 square miles (0.8 km^{2}), all land.

== Demographics ==
As of the census of 2000, there were 413 people, 131 households, and 99 families residing in the CDP. The population density was 445.8 people per square mile (171.5/km^{2}). There were 160 housing units at an average density of 172.7/sq mi (66.4/km^{2}). The racial makeup of the CDP was 70.22% White, 3.15% African American, 0.73% Native American, 0.24% Asian, 11.14% from other races, and 14.53% from two or more races. Hispanic or Latino of any race were 18.40% of the population.

There were 131 households, out of which 50.4% had children under the age of 18 living with them, 55.7% were married couples living together, 13.0% had a female householder with no husband present, and 23.7% were non-families. 14.5% of all households were made up of individuals, and 1.5% had someone living alone who was 65 years of age or older. The average household size was 3.15 and the average family size was 3.56.

In the CDP, the population was spread out, with 36.3% under the age of 18, 13.1% from 18 to 24, 36.8% from 25 to 44, 10.4% from 45 to 64, and 3.4% who were 65 years of age or older. The median age was 25 years. For every 100 females, there were 123.2 males. For every 100 females age 18 and over, there were 108.7 males.

The median income for a household in the CDP was $32,303, and the median income for a family was $45,156. Males had a median income of $27,014 versus $20,357 for females. The per capita income for the CDP was $16,394. About 6.1% of families and 8.8% of the population were below the poverty line, including none of those under the age of eighteen or sixty-five or over.

== Education ==
The Purple Sage census-designated place (the shape as of the 2020 U.S. census) is within Sweetwater County School District #1.

There was an area to the west that was defined as the Purple Sage CDP in the 2000 U.S. census, but not as such in the 2010 U.S. census and beyond. Part of that area lies in Sweetwater County School District Two.

== See also ==
- Interstate 80 in Wyoming
- Rock Springs, Wyoming
