= Wyoming Highway 78 =

Highway in Wyoming

Wyoming Highway 78
- South Higley Boulevard
- WYO 78 highlighted in red

Route information
- Maintained by WYDOT
- Length: 1.23 mi (1.98 km)

Major junctions
- South end: Wyoming State Penitentiary in Rawlins
- I-80 / US 30 in Rawlins
- North end: WYO 71 in Rawlins

Location
- Country: United States
- State: Wyoming
- Counties: Carbon

Highway system
- Wyoming State Highway System; Interstate; US; State
| ← WYO 77 | → I-80 |

Wyoming Highway 78 (WYO 78) is a 1.23-mile (1.98 km) long Wyoming state highway located in Carbon County in the city of Rawlins. The highway runs along a portion of South Higley Boulevard.

== Route description ==
Wyoming Highway 78, albeit short in length, serves as a connection between Highway 71, Interstate 80, and U.S. Route 30 at exit 214, and the Wyoming State Penitentiary to the south. Highway 78 begins at the Wyoming State Penitentiary south of Rawlins, and heads north along South Higley Boulevard. Highway 78 intersects I-80 / US 30 at exit 214, and just 0.15 miles (0.24 km) later terminates at Highway 71.

Mileposts increase from north to south along Highway 78.

== Major intersections ==
The entire route is in Rawlins, Carbon County.

| mi | km | Destinations | Notes |
|---|---|---|---|
| 0.00 | 0.00 | Wyoming State Penitentiary | Southern terminus |
| 1.08 | 1.74 | I-80 / US 30 – Rock Springs, Laramie | Exit 214 on I-80 / US 30 |
| 1.23 | 1.98 | WYO 71 south / South Higley Boulevard north | Northern terminus; northern terminus of WYO 71 |
1.000 mi = 1.609 km; 1.000 km = 0.621 mi

== See also ==
- U.S. Route 287, which carries the name North Higley Boulevard in Rawlins
