= Wyoming Highway 71 =

State highway in Wyoming, United States

Wyoming Highway 71
- Sage Creek Road
- WYO 71 highlighted in red

Route information
- Maintained by WYDOT
- Length: 10.83 mi (17.43 km)

Major junctions
- South end: CR 401 near the Teton Reservoir
- North end: WYO 78 in Rawlins

Location
- Country: United States
- State: Wyoming
- Counties: Carbon

Highway system
- Wyoming State Highway System; Interstate; US; State
← WYO 70	→ WYO 72

Wyoming Highway 71 (WYO 71) is a 10.83-mile-long (17.43 km) north–south Wyoming state highway known as Sage Creek Road in Carbon County that travels from near the Teton Reservoir north into the southern part of Rawlins.

== Route description ==
Highway 71, predominantly south of Rawlins, travels from Carbon County Route 401 near the Teton Reservoir area north to Rawlins. Upon entering the Rawlins city limits, and after passing under Interstate 80/U.S. Route 30, WYO 71 heads in a more east–west direction paralleling the interstate. Downtown Rawlins can be accessed via Jackson and Washington Streets Highway 71 comes to its northern end at Wyoming Highway 78 just 0.15 miles (790 ft) from exit 214 of I-80/US 30.

Carbon County Route 401 continues south from WYO 71 to the Medicine Bow National Forest boundary where the designation for the roadway changes to Forest Service Road 801 till its end at Wyoming Highway 70. The road is dirt and gravel for the entire county and forest service portion.

== Major intersections ==
The entire route is in Carbon County.

Location	mi	km	Destinations	Notes
	0.00	0.00	CR 401	Southern terminus
Rawlins	10.03	16.14	Jackson Street to I-80 Bus. / US 30 Bus. / WYO 789	
Rawlins	10.47	16.85	Washington Street to I-80 Bus. / US 30 Bus. / US 287	
Rawlins	10.83	17.43	WYO 78 south to I-80 / US 30	Northern terminus; northern terminus of WYO 78
1.000 mi = 1.609 km; 1.000 km = 0.621 mi
