= Wyoming Highway 222 =

State highway in Wyoming, United States

Wyoming Highway 222
- Fort Access Road
- WYO 222 highlighted in red

Route information
- Maintained by WYDOT
- Length: 1.81 mi (2.91 km)

Major junctions
- South end: WYO 225 west of Cheyenne.
- I-80 / US 30 west of Cheyenne
- North end: WYO 210 west of Cheyenne

Location
- Country: United States
- State: Wyoming
- Counties: Laramie

Highway system
- Wyoming State Highway System; Interstate; US; State
← WYO 221	→ WYO 223

Wyoming Highway 222 (WYO 222) is a 1.81-mile-long (2.91 km) Wyoming State Road known as Fort Access Road located in Laramie County, on the western edge of Cheyenne.

== Route description ==
Wyoming Highway 222 travels from its south end at Wyoming Highway 225 (Otto Road) and travels north intersecting Interstate 80 and US 30 (exit 357) at 0.79 miles (1.27 km). At 1.81 miles (2.91 km) WYO 222 intersects Wyoming Highway 210 (Happy Jack Road), its northern terminus at the southwest corner of F.E. Warren Air Force Base.

== History ==
Highway 222 was originally 8.29 miles long and traveled from WYO 225 north to WYO 211. The segment of WYO 222 north of Highway 210 to Highway 211 has since been decommissioned.

== Major intersections ==
The entire route is in Laramie County.

Location	mi	km	Destinations	Notes
	0.00	0.00	WYO 225 (Otto Road)	Southern terminus
	0.79	1.27	I-80 / US 30 – Laramie, Cheyenne	I-80 exit 357;
	1.81	2.91	WYO 210 (Happy Jack Road)	Northern terminus; road continues as Roundtop Road
1.000 mi = 1.609 km; 1.000 km = 0.621 mi: Concurrency terminus; Proposed; Incomplete access; Route transition

== See also ==
- List of state highways in Wyoming
- List of highways numbered 222
