= Wamsutter, Wyoming =

Town in Sweetwater County, Wyoming, United States

- Town
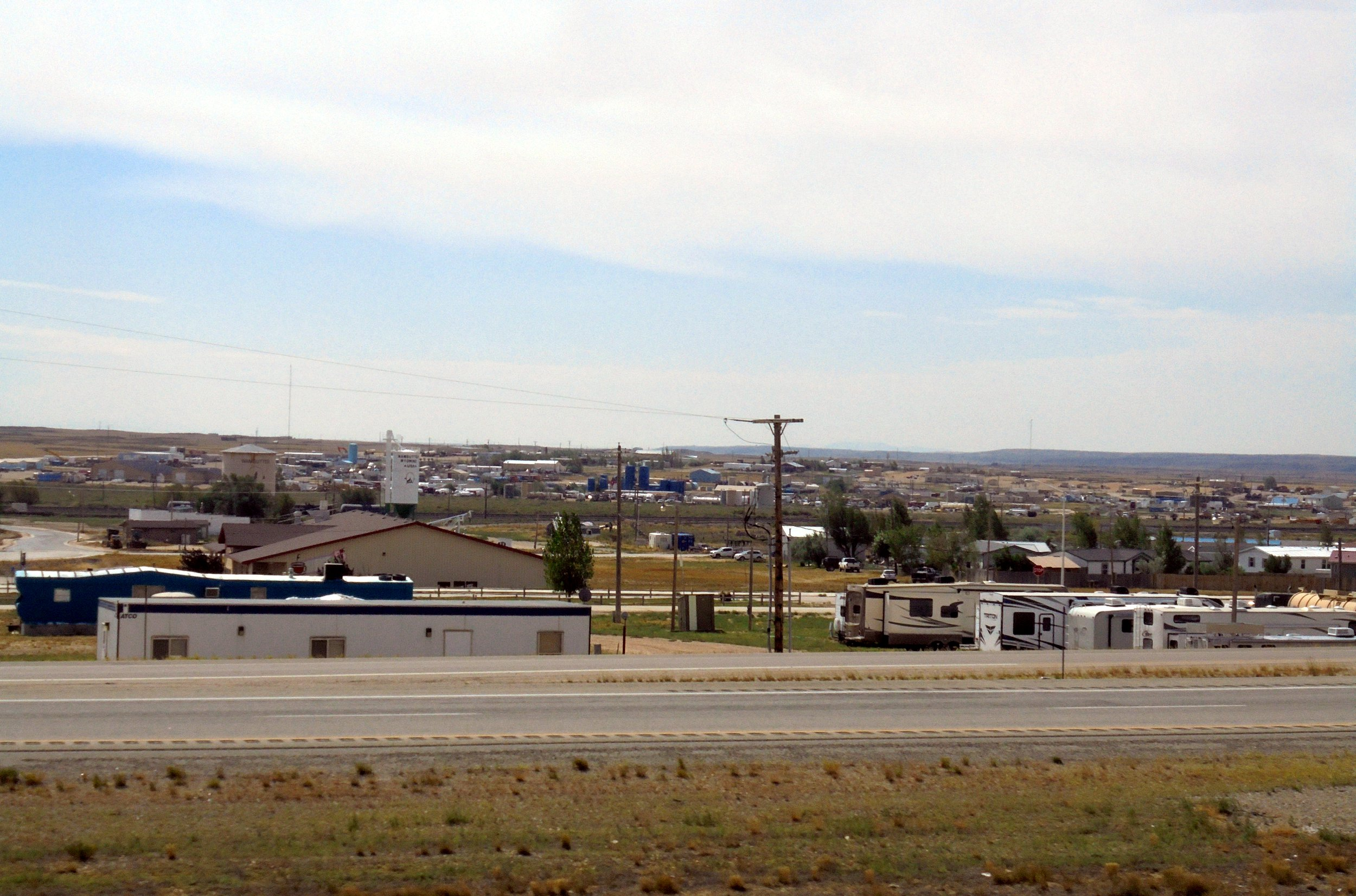
- Panorama of Wamsutter, looking south from I‑80 / US 30, August 2019

- Location of Wamsutter in Sweetwater County, Wyoming
- Coordinates: 41°40′05″N 107°58′45″W
- Country: United States
- State: Wyoming
- County: Sweetwater

Area
  - Total: 1.63 sq mi (4.21 km^{2})
  - Land: 1.63 sq mi (4.21 km^{2})
  - Water: 0 sq mi (0.00 km^{2})
- Elevation: 6,746 ft (2,056 m)

Population (2020)
  - Total: 203
  - Density: 287.0/sq mi (110.82/km^{2})
- Time zone: UTC-7 (Mountain (MST))
  - Summer (DST): UTC-6 (MDT)
- ZIP code: 82336
- Area code: 307
- FIPS code: 56-81300
- GNIS feature ID: 2413445
- Website: www.wamsutter-wy.org

Wamsutter is a town in Sweetwater County, Wyoming, United States. The population was 203 at the 2020 census.

== Description ==
The original inhabitants of the area were the Shoshone and Ute tribes. Westerners only began to settle in the county with the coming of the railroad in the 1860s. Originally, the town was known as Washakie. Confusion with nearby Fort Washakie prompted an 1884 name change to Wamsutter, after a Union Pacific bridge engineer.

The town, which bills itself as "The Gateway to the Red Desert" is located along Interstate 80 between Rawlins and Rock Springs, on the easternmost border of Sweetwater County. The natural gas industry has exerted great influence on Wamsutter in recent years, through employment opportunities in the area, and by contributing to the community directly.

Wamsutter is the largest settlement, and the only incorporated town in the Great Divide Basin.

== History ==
The town was founded in 1868 as a vital service stop for the Union Pacific Railroad. During the construction of the Transcontinental railroad, steam locomotives required regular stops for water and coal, and Wamsutter provided an essential oasis in the water-scarce Red Desert. Initially, the settlement was named Washakie, in honor of the prominent Shoshone Chief Washakie. However, this caused significant logistical confusion for the railroad and the government, as freight intended for the nearby Fort Washakie was often misdirected to the rail stop. To resolve this, the town was renamed Wamsutter in 1884. Wamsutter was incorporated in 1914. In the latter half of the 20th century, Wamsutter’s economy shifted toward resource extraction. Natural gas was discovered in the Wamsutter Arch in 1946, with major reserves found at Desert Springs in 1958. This sparked several boom-and-bust cycles. By the early 2000s, the "Wamsutter Field" became one of the largest tight gas reservoirs in Wyoming, attracting major energy companies and causing the population to peak at 451 in 2010 before declining again during industry downturns.

The town was a stop on the Lincoln highway, U.S. Route 30, largely superseded by Interstate 80.

== Demographics ==
Historical population
| Census | Pop. | Note | %± |
|---|---|---|---|
| 1940 | 169 | | — |
| 1950 | 103 | | −39.1% |
| 1960 | 110 | | 6.8% |
| 1970 | 139 | | 26.4% |
| 1980 | 681 | | 389.9% |
| 1990 | 240 | | −64.8% |
| 2000 | 261 | | 8.8% |
| 2010 | 451 | | 72.8% |
| 2020 | 203 | | −55.0% |
U.S. Decennial Census

=== 2010 census ===
As of the census of 2010, there were 451 people, 189 households, and 112 families residing in the town. The population density was 311.0 inhabitants per square mile (120.1/km^{2}). There were 286 housing units at an average density of 197.2 per square mile (76.1/km^{2}). The racial makeup of the town was 82.7% White, 0.7% African American, 2.9% Native American, 11.1% from other races, and 2.7% from two or more races. Hispanic or Latino of any race were 19.7% of the population.

There were 189 households, of which 32.3% had children under the age of 18 living with them, 45.5% were married couples living together, 8.5% had a female householder with no husband present, 5.3% had a male householder with no wife present, and 40.7% were non-families. 29.6% of all households were made up of individuals, and 3.2% had someone living alone who was 65 years of age or older. The average household size was 2.39 and the average family size was 2.96.

The median age in the town was 38.3 years. 25.7% of residents were under the age of 18; 6.7% were between the ages of 18 and 24; 27.9% were from 25 to 44; 33.6% were from 45 to 64; and 6% were 65 years of age or older. The gender makeup of the town was 58.1% male and 41.9% female.

=== 2000 census ===
As of the census of 2000, there were 261 people, 100 households, and 65 families residing in the town. The population density was 198.7 people per square mile (76.9/km^{2}). There were 148 housing units at an average density of 112.6 per square mile (43.6/km^{2}). The racial makeup of the town was 93.87% White, 0.77% Native American, 3.07% from other races, and 2.30% from two or more races. Hispanic or Latino of any race were 13.03% of the population.

There were 100 households, out of which 38.0% had children under the age of 18 living with them, 54.0% were married couples living together, 8.0% had a female householder with no husband present, and 35.0% were non-families. 29.0% of all households were made up of individuals, and 5.0% had someone living alone who was 65 years of age or older. The average household size was 2.54 and the average family size was 3.25.

In the town, the population was spread out, with 31.4% under the age of 18, 6.9% from 18 to 24, 34.9% from 25 to 44, 23.8% from 45 to 64, and 3.1% who were 65 years of age or older. The median age was 33 years. For every 100 females, there were 119.3 males. For every 100 females age 18 and over, there were 126.6 males.

The median income for a household in the town was $35,625, and the median income for a family was $46,250. Males had a median income of $34,643 versus $20,000 for females. The per capita income for the town was $18,943. About 11.4% of families and 10.6% of the population were below the poverty line, including 20.6% of those under the age of eighteen and none of those 65 or over.

== Geography ==
According to the United States Census Bureau, the town has a total area of 1.45 square miles (3.76 km^{2}), all land.

=== Climate ===
According to the Köppen Climate Classification system, Wamsutter has a cold semi-arid climate, abbreviated "BSk" on climate maps. The hottest temperature recorded in Wamsutter was 105 °F (41 °C) on July 28, 1897, while the coldest temperature recorded was −40 °F (−40 °C) on January 1, 1979, and February 2, 2011.

Climate data for Wamsutter, Wyoming, 1991–2020 normals, extremes 1897–present
| Month | Jan | Feb | Mar | Apr | May | Jun | Jul | Aug | Sep | Oct | Nov | Dec | Year |
|---|---|---|---|---|---|---|---|---|---|---|---|---|---|
| Record high °F (°C) | 52 (11) | 59 (15) | 79 (26) | 78 (26) | 90 (32) | 104 (40) | 105 (41) | 100 (38) | 91 (33) | 87 (31) | 71 (22) | 79 (26) | 105 (41) |
| Mean maximum °F (°C) | 41.0 (5.0) | 46.7 (8.2) | 60.8 (16.0) | 71.5 (21.9) | 79.4 (26.3) | 88.0 (31.1) | 92.5 (33.6) | 90.3 (32.4) | 85.3 (29.6) | 74.5 (23.6) | 58.3 (14.6) | 44.4 (6.9) | 91.0 (32.8) |
| Mean daily maximum °F (°C) | 29.6 (−1.3) | 33.4 (0.8) | 45.3 (7.4) | 54.6 (12.6) | 65.1 (18.4) | 76.9 (24.9) | 85.1 (29.5) | 82.7 (28.2) | 72.6 (22.6) | 58.1 (14.5) | 42.2 (5.7) | 29.9 (−1.2) | 56.3 (13.5) |
| Daily mean °F (°C) | 19.0 (−7.2) | 22.3 (−5.4) | 33.1 (0.6) | 40.6 (4.8) | 49.9 (9.9) | 59.9 (15.5) | 67.6 (19.8) | 65.3 (18.5) | 56.0 (13.3) | 43.6 (6.4) | 30.3 (−0.9) | 19.5 (−6.9) | 42.3 (5.7) |
| Mean daily minimum °F (°C) | 8.5 (−13.1) | 11.3 (−11.5) | 20.8 (−6.2) | 26.6 (−3.0) | 34.8 (1.6) | 42.9 (6.1) | 50.1 (10.1) | 48.0 (8.9) | 39.3 (4.1) | 29.2 (−1.6) | 18.4 (−7.6) | 9.1 (−12.7) | 28.3 (−2.1) |
| Mean minimum °F (°C) | −14.8 (−26.0) | −10.9 (−23.8) | 1.4 (−17.0) | 11.6 (−11.3) | 21.4 (−5.9) | 31.5 (−0.3) | 39.0 (3.9) | 36.0 (2.2) | 24.5 (−4.2) | 9.7 (−12.4) | −3.2 (−19.6) | −13.5 (−25.3) | −19.9 (−28.8) |
| Record low °F (°C) | −40 (−40) | −40 (−40) | −26 (−32) | −8 (−22) | 10 (−12) | 19 (−7) | 24 (−4) | 23 (−5) | 5 (−15) | −21 (−29) | −27 (−33) | −33 (−36) | −40 (−40) |
| Average precipitation inches (mm) | 0.43 (11) | 0.40 (10) | 0.48 (12) | 0.76 (19) | 1.35 (34) | 0.81 (21) | 0.67 (17) | 0.72 (18) | 0.90 (23) | 0.76 (19) | 0.64 (16) | 0.53 (13) | 8.45 (213) |
| Average snowfall inches (cm) | 7.8 (20) | 7.6 (19) | 7.2 (18) | 6.1 (15) | 2.5 (6.4) | 0.1 (0.25) | 0.0 (0.0) | 0.0 (0.0) | 0.7 (1.8) | 3.0 (7.6) | 7.0 (18) | 8.8 (22) | 50.8 (128.05) |
| Average precipitation days (≥ 0.01 in) | 4.5 | 4.7 | 4.9 | 6.6 | 7.3 | 4.5 | 4.3 | 4.9 | 5.2 | 4.3 | 4.6 | 5.0 | 60.8 |
| Average snowy days (≥ 0.1 in) | 4.0 | 3.6 | 3.3 | 3.1 | 0.9 | 0.0 | 0.0 | 0.0 | 0.3 | 1.2 | 3.0 | 4.3 | 23.7 |
Source 1: NOAA
Source 2: National Weather Service

== Education ==
Public education in the town of Wamsutter is provided by Sweetwater County School District #1. Students in grades K–8 attend Desert School in Wamsutter, which is divided into elementary (grades K–6) and middle school (grades 7–8) campuses. Upon the completion of 8th grade, students attend Rawlins High School (grades 9–12; part of Carbon County School District #1) by agreement of the respective boards of trustees.

Wamsutter has a public library, a branch of the Sweetwater County Library System.

== See also ==
- List of municipalities in Wyoming
