= Red Desert (Wyoming) =

Arid region of south-central Wyoming, United States

Coordinates: 41°49′29″N 108°17′12″W

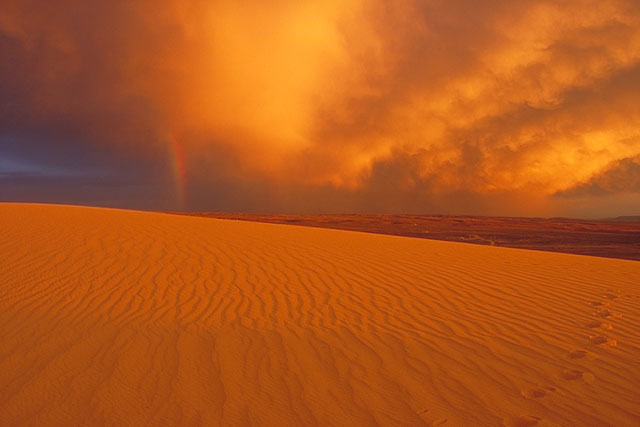
The Killpecker Sand Dunes of the Red Desert support a wide range of wildlife and vegetation, ranging from elk who use the adjoining sagebrush steppe for shelter to aquatic organisms that thrive in snowmelt ponds. Photo by the Bureau of Land Management.

The Red Desert is a high-altitude desert and sagebrush steppe located in the south-central portion of the U.S. state of Wyoming, comprising approximately 9,320 square miles (24,100 square kilometers). Among the natural features in the Red Desert region are the Great Divide Basin, a unique endorheic drainage basin formed by a division in the Continental Divide, and the Killpecker Sand Dunes, the largest living dune system in the United States. In the 19th century, the Oregon, California, and Mormon Trails crossed the Continental Divide at South Pass, just north of the Red Desert. Today, busy Interstate 80 bisects the desert's southern region while gas field roads cross the desert.

The majority of the Red Desert is public land managed by the Rock Springs and Rawlins field offices of the U.S. Bureau of Land Management (BLM). The region is rich in oil, natural gas, uranium, and coal. An estimated 84% of the Red Desert has been "industrialized" by oil and gas drilling or by mining operations and associated roads.

The Red Desert supports an abundance of wildlife, despite its scarcity of water and vegetation. The largest migratory herd of pronghorn in the lower 48 states and a rare desert elk herd, said to be the world's largest, live in the desert. Ponds fed by summer snowmelt attract a wide range of migratory birds such as ducks, trumpeter swans, and white pelicans. Herds of wild, free-roaming horses protected under the Wild Free-Roaming Horses and Burros Act of 1971 roam the area, despite roundups and population control efforts by the BLM. Bison were once common as well and their skulls and horns can occasionally be found there.

== Geography ==
=== Climate ===
The Red Desert has a cold semi-arid climate (in the Köppen climate classification, BSk) with low humidity and precipitation, frequent winds, mild summers, and cold winters. Frosts can occur even in fall and spring. There are large swings between daytime and nighttime temperatures.

=== Water ===
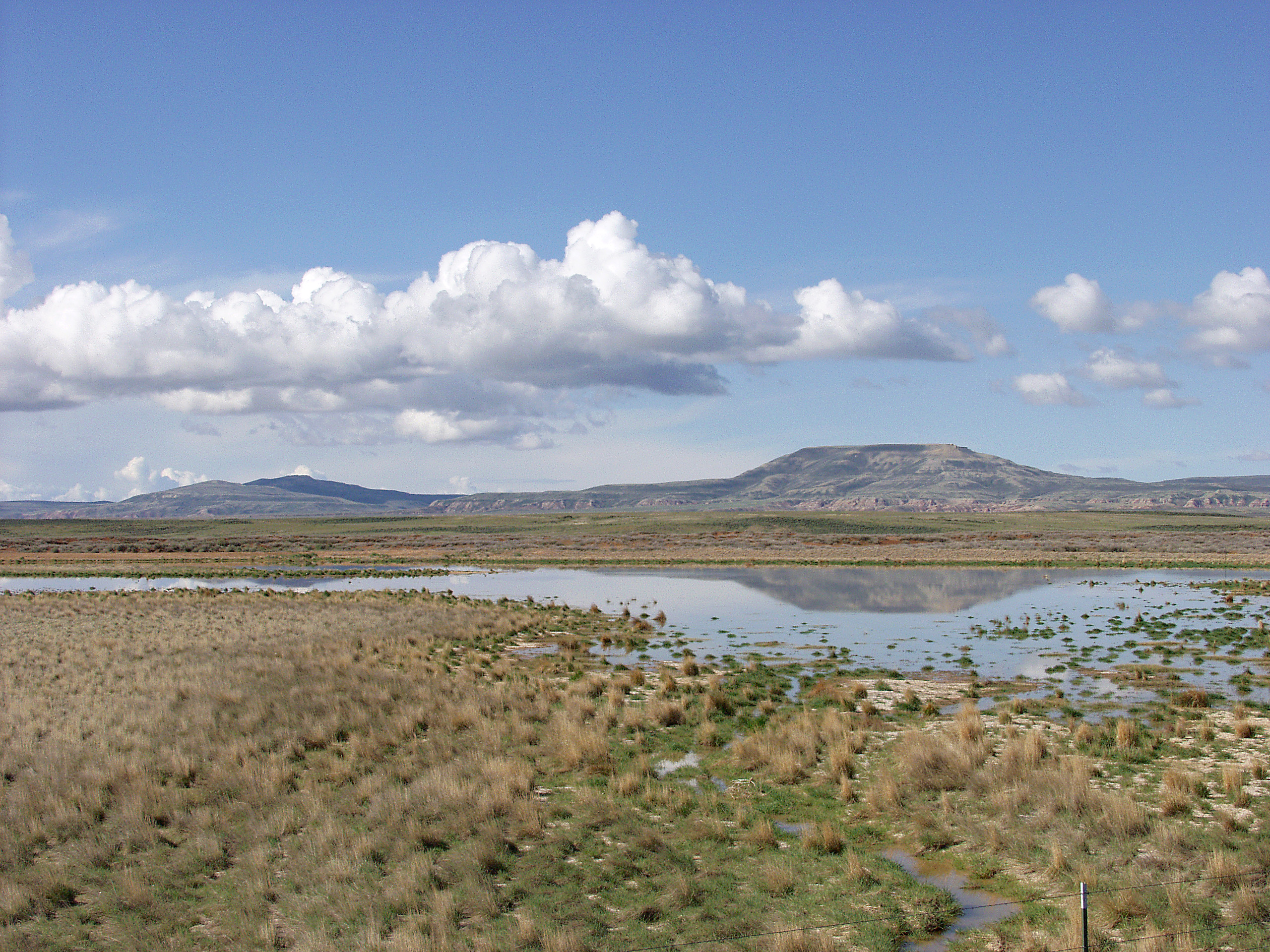
Melting snowpack is the primary source of surface water in Wyoming, such as this temporary wetland in the Muddy Creek Watershed of the Red Desert.

In a land known for its scarcity of precipitation, water has been a powerful force in shaping the Red Desert. Former rivers from the Paleocene and later epochs and the ancient Lake Gosiute deposited between 10,000 feet (3,000 m) and 20,000 feet (6,100 m) of sediment in the Red Desert's geographic basin.

Lake Gosiute began to fill the Red Desert for the first time in the early Eocene Epoch. Subsequent climate and tectonic activities during the lake's lifespan (four million years) saw repeated patterns of rising and falling water levels. Gosiute reached its maximum surface area of 15,000 square miles (39,000 km^{2}) with its shoreline stretching into Utah. During other times the lake evaporated completely.

Lake Gosiute left behind a high concentration of saline materials and a deep primal ooze of organic matter. The former produced today's highly valued mineral trona, while the latter created coal-bed methane gas, coal, and the world's largest known oil-shale deposit. Energy sources have made the region the center of today's natural gas boom in Wyoming.

The contemporary Red Desert watershed includes saline lakes and ponds that feature mud flats during wet years and dry lakes in droughts. Intermittent streams, dependent primarily upon snow melt but accelerated by summer thundershowers, cut arroyos throughout the basin. Such small earth moving events, repeated over the eons, combined with the sculpting forces of wind have created the rugged landscape of buttes, pinnacles, gulches, and flats that characterize the Red Desert.

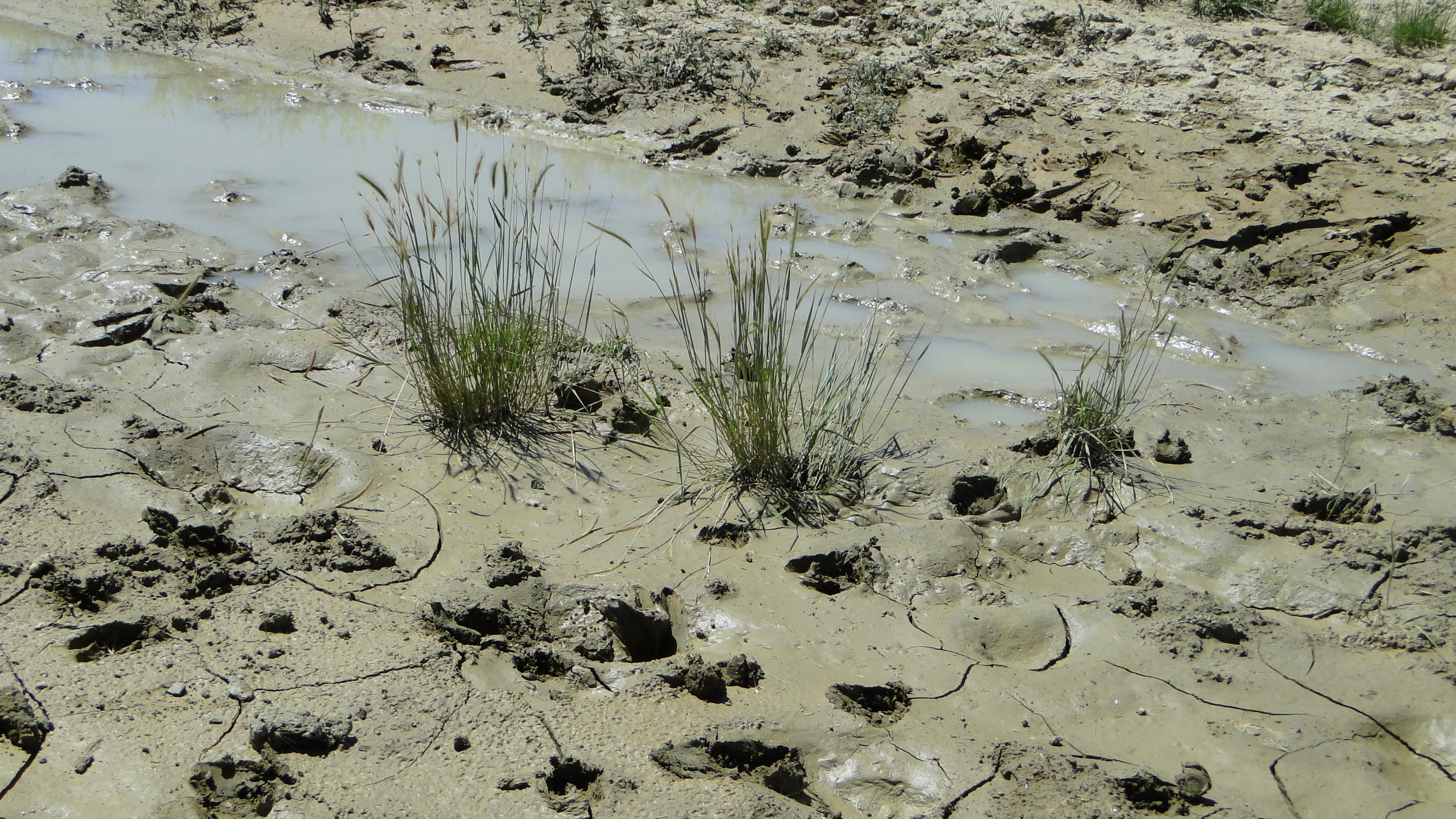
Summer rains produce standing water in the desert, which supports wildlife, such as pronghorn, deer, and birds.

The Continental Divide branches to the desert's northwest and rejoins in the southeast, creating the Great Divide Basin, from which no surface water drains. Steamboat Mountain and other desert mesas or buttes provide seeps and springs that serve as water sources for small streams, such as Jack Morrow Creek. While the basin's interior waters are intermittent, the desert is bounded to the west by the Green River and to the east by the North Platte River.

In 2009, the U.S. Army Corps of Engineers was poised to launch an environmental impact statement regarding a proposed 560 miles (900 km) pipeline to divert water from the Green River to population centers near Denver, Colorado. The $4 billion project targeted a route east from Flaming Gorge Reservoir across the Red Desert to Laramie, Wyoming, and then south to the Colorado Front Range.

=== Killpecker Sand Dunes ===
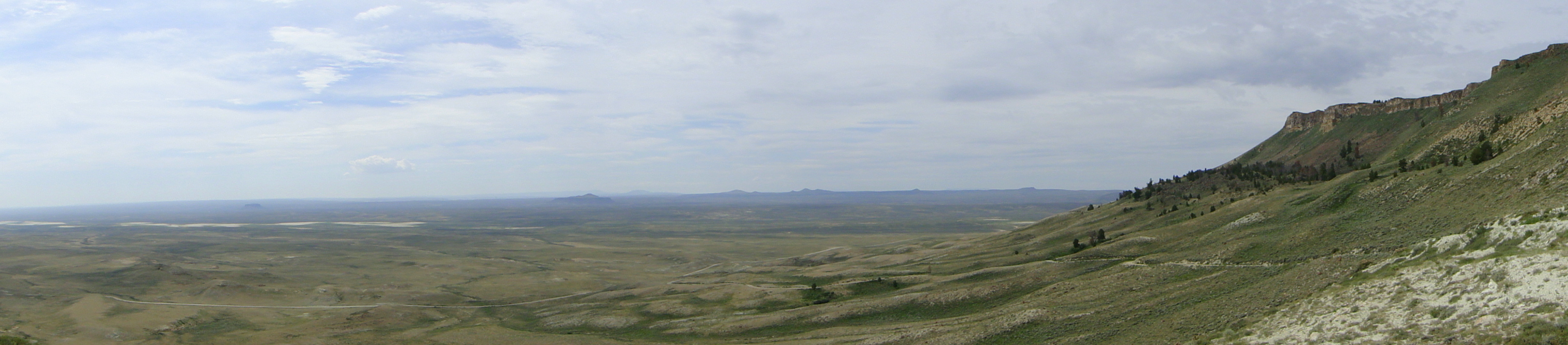
Steamboat Mountain, overlooking the Killpecker Sand Dunes, provides habitat for desert elk.

The Killpecker Sand Dunes stretch 55 miles (89 km) east from the Green River Basin across the Continental Divide into the Great Divide Basin and encompass approximately 109,000 acres (440 km^{2}). These living dunes, one of North America's largest fields, owe their presence to two key factors:

- The Big Sandy and Little Sandy Rivers northeast of Rock Springs, Wyoming, where large volumes of sand accumulated on their banks during glacial melting from the Wind River Mountains.
- Westerly winds that during the past 20,000 years have moved the sand eastward across the continental divide to its present location.

A vital function of the dune fields is storing snowmelt and rain which support vegetation and wildlife. Water percolates deep into sand where it is safe from evaporating winds and sun. Such water is stored for access by basin large sagebrush and other vegetation depending upon the dunes' degree of stabilization. The few plant species that can survive on the active dunes include:

- Blowout grass, Indian rice grass, needle-and-thread grass, prairie sandweed, rusty lupine, salina wildrye, sand lovegrass, sand muhly, sandhill muhly, and scurfpea.

Such plants help stabilize the sand by slightly reducing ground-level wind velocity. Stabilization is a cumulative process. Eventually the dunes may become stable as plant cover increases—assuming disruptive forces such as drought, fire, livestock and human traffic are not present.

Dune beetles and other insects in addition to small mammals such as shrews, white-footed mice and kangaroo rats inhabit the dunes. Their presence attracts owls, eagles, bobcats and other predators. Moreover, an oasis of short-lived summer ponds that occur in swales at the base of the dunes support migratory shore birds and waders, as well as large game animals such as elk. Cattle, sheep, and free roaming wild horses also frequent the ponds. The fresh water also provides a habitat for aquatic organism such as salamanders and freshwater shrimp.

Active sand dunes within the 10,500 acres (42 km^{2}) of the Killpecker Sand Dunes area are open to off-road vehicles. Motorists are required to avoid the fresh water ponds scattered throughout the dunes.

=== Plant and wildlife ===
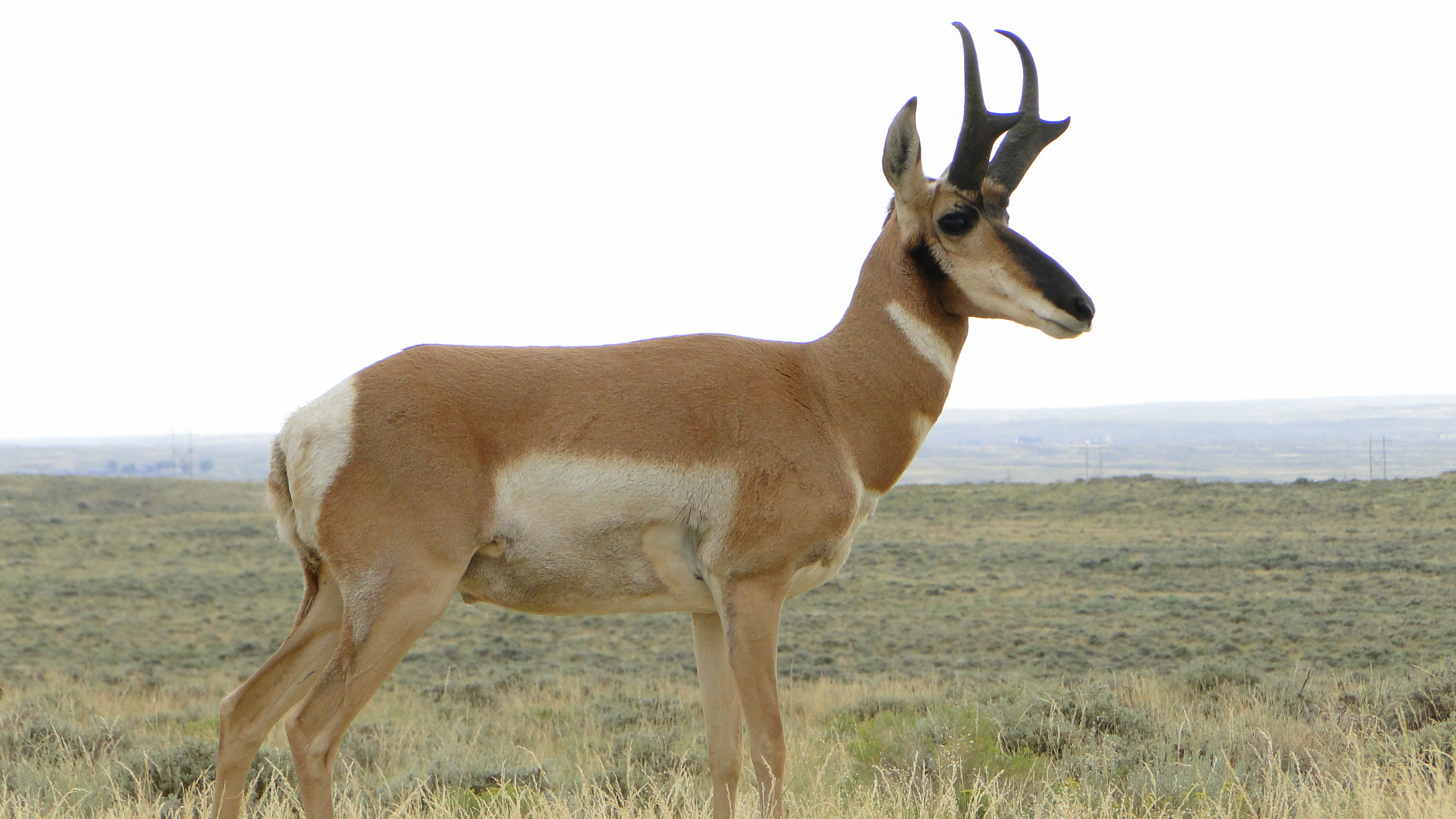
Proposed energy development will likely further reduce an already declining pronghorn population in an area that includes the Southern Red Desert, according to a study by National Wildlife Federation.

At first glance the Red Desert's largely dry, barren landscape seems an unlikely location for some 350 wildlife species and more than 1,000 plant species. The sagebrush steppe and bunchgrass habitat support 40,000 to 50,000 pronghorn antelope, the largest migratory herd in the lower forty-eight states, mule deer and the world's largest desert elk herd.

What the desert lacks in concentrated animal habitat, it makes up in expanse. The Red Desert is home to the largest unfenced area in the continental United States. Nearly three-quarters of the area is covered by sagebrush grassland.

Sagebrush is a critical habitat for a variety of wildlife ranging from pronghorn which browse it year round to small insects. However, habitat is constrained by oil and gas roads along with drilling and mining. Sagebrush also provides cover for animals such as elk and the pygmy rabbit. Elk depend upon tall brush near Steamboat Mountain for shelter during spring calving season and elsewhere for shade during the heat of summer. Yet the broader impact of sagebrush upon the ecology is its function as a living snow fence. Windblown snow builds up on the lee side of the brush during winter. This effectively stores moisture that is released into the soil in late spring and early summer.

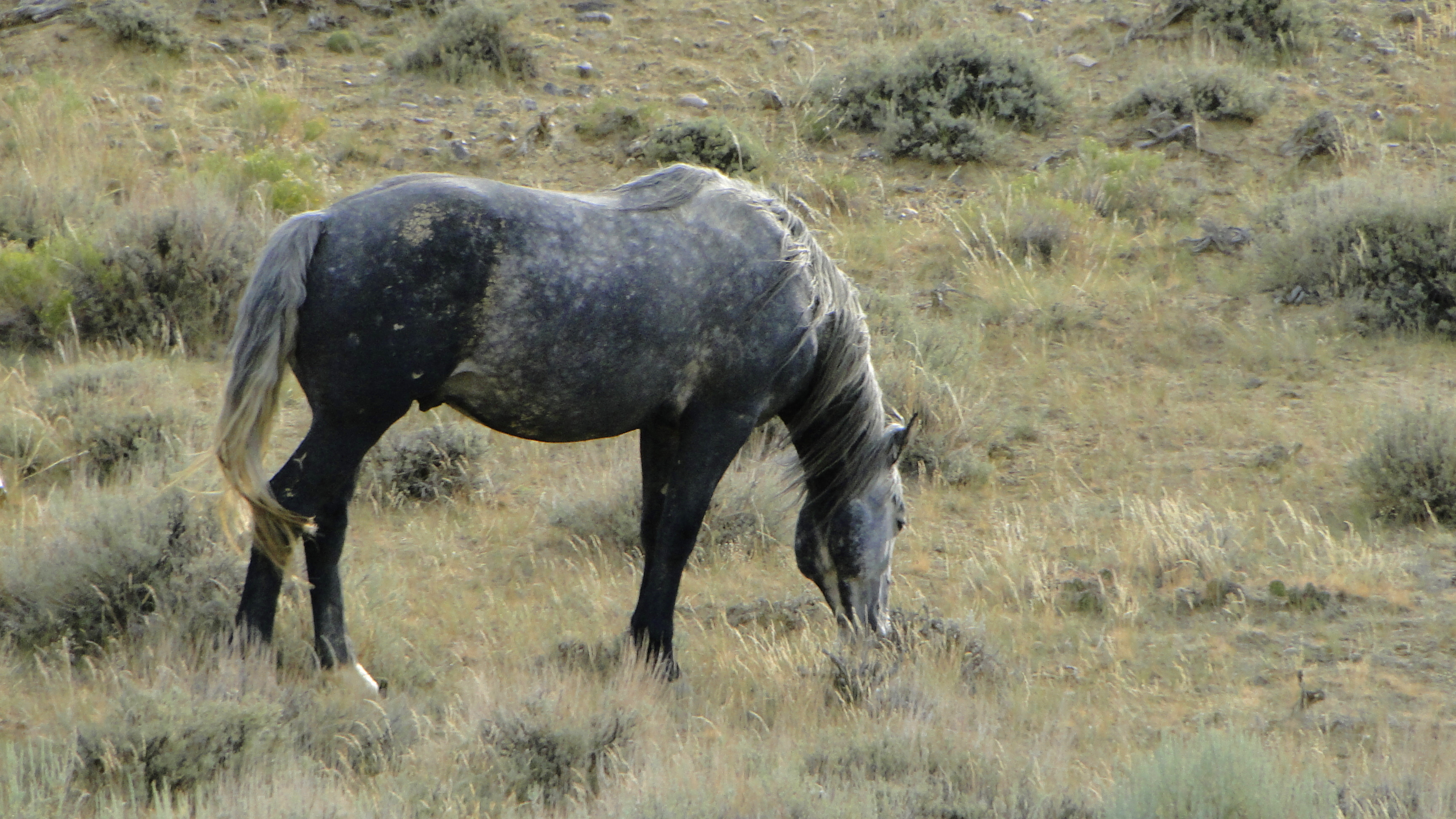
Unbranded and unclaimed horses on public lands in the Red Desert are protected by the Wild and Free-Roaming Horses and Burros Act of 1971.

The result of the Red Desert's unique ecology is that wildlife is varied. Predators such as coyotes and the occasional mountain lion, swift fox, and kit fox are attracted by the area's mammals for feed. Pocket gophers, badgers, sage grouse, sage sparrows, and the sage thrasher are associated with the sagebrush habitat. The Red Desert is home to a range of burrowing animals. The white-tailed prairie dog, Great Basin spadefoot toad, tiger salamander, pygmy rabbits, and sagebrush lizards all go underground for protection from the desert's extreme weather and predators. Similarly, the burrowing owl nests and roosts underground, typically in burrows dug by prairie dogs. Migratory summer birds such as the white-faced ibis and white pelican are found at snow-melt ponds on the desert floor and at temporal wetlands.

High above the desert floor, the Ferris Mountains and Green Mountains rim the Red Desert to the northeast. The mountains' boreal environment reaches as high as 10,037 feet (3,059 m), in the case of Ferris Peak, and supports snowshoe hares, red squirrels, and pockets of big horn sheep. The high elevation with its cooler summer range attracts elk and mule deer. Prairie falcons, northern harriers and other raptors soar along mountain ridges and canyon rims looking for feed such as migratory mountain plovers, a small ground bird.

The mountain plover is one of three species protected by the Endangered Species Act present in the Red Desert. The bald eagle and the black-footed ferret are also listed. However, the bald eagle is seldom seen in the desert because of the lack of streams or lakes with accompanying fish. Black-footed ferrets, which feed upon prairie dogs, are also rare.

=== Cultural and economic landscape ===
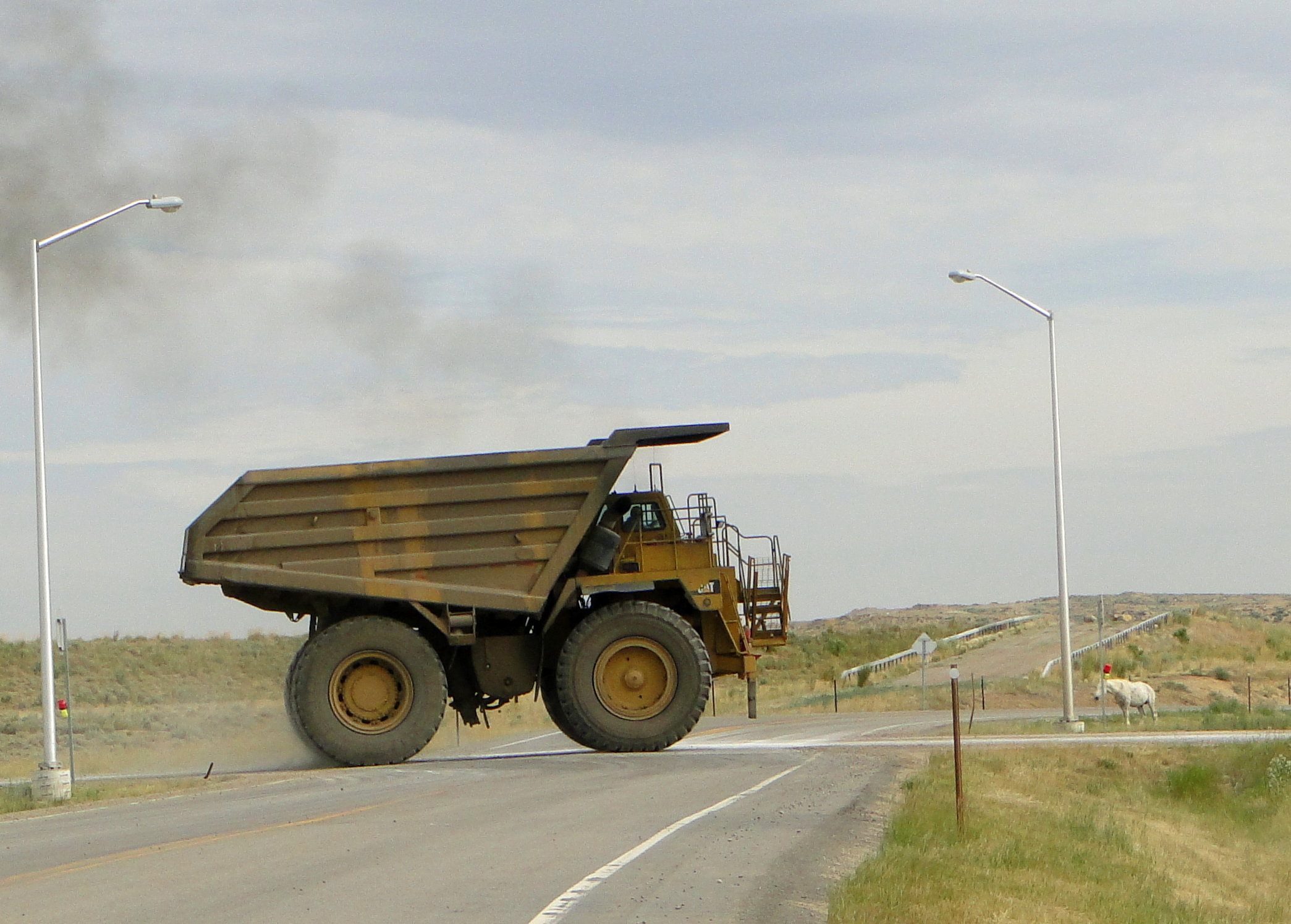
A truck hauling coal for the Jim Bridger Power Plant near Point of Rocks, Wyo., dwarfs a nearby wild horse.

Scientists trace the story of human presence in the Red Desert back 12,000 years. Striking evidence of early human inhabitants is seen in rock art found at the Boars Tusk, East Flaming Gorge, and Seedskadee areas. Researchers interpret the petroglyphs carved into rock at these sites as biographical, ceremonial, or spiritual expressions. The Red Desert's Black Art petrogylph is thought to date back 11,500 years, according to anthropologist and cultural historian Russell L. Tanner who says the rock art may be the continent's oldest.

Tanner refers to the Red Desert as a marketplace and crossroads during more recent times of interaction between nomadic Plains Indians, including Blackfeet, Crows, and Shoshone. He writes that rock art of the times, especially along the Green River, sprang from a melding of Indian cultures represented by imagery of the Plains Indian warrior tradition. Other pre-historic evidence include Native American artifacts estimated to be more than 10,000 years old found in the Killpecker Sand Dunes, often in company with bison bones.

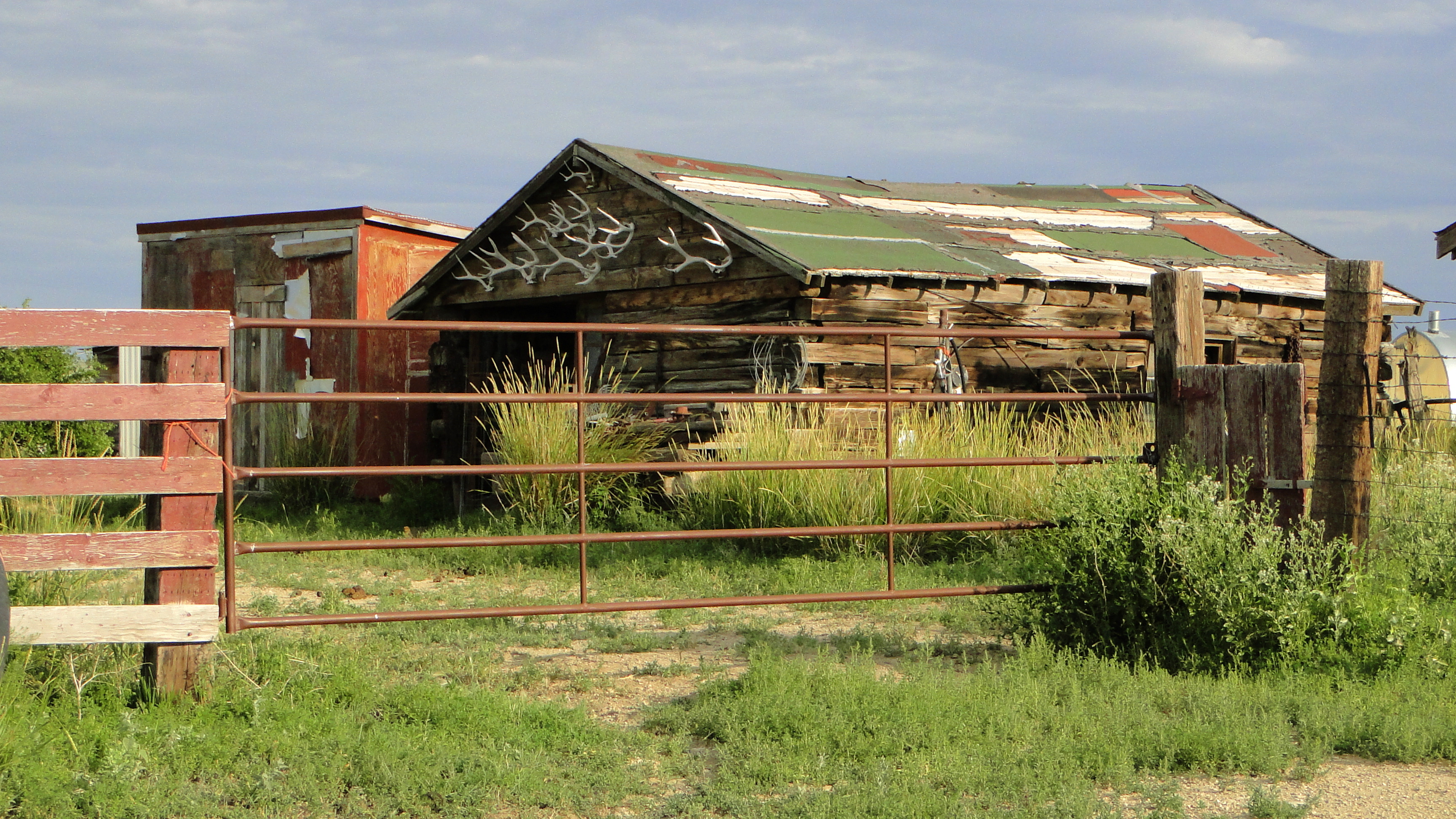
The Red Desert's ranching industry includes remote cattle and horse ranches.

Generations of American families, beginning in the 1840s, also left their mark upon the desert as they migrated westward along emigrant trails. The environmental impact of an estimated 350,000 pioneers and their wagon trains traveling through Wyoming between 1841 and 1868 is still visible today. In some cases, such as at Guernsey, wagon wheels wore ruts deep into solid limestone. However, most trail ruts are less dramatic but still evidence of a people's history worn into the earth.

Historic trails used by nineteenth century stagecoaches are also part of the Red Desert's legacy. Of particular note, the Overland Stage initially followed the Platte River and the Oregon Trail to South Pass, but later shifted to a route across southern Wyoming. Stagecoach ruts in the desert are still visible in a variety of locations including north of Baggs. A short-lived gold rush in the mountains north of the Red Desert beginning in 1867 led to stage and freight service from Point of Rocks on the Union Pacific Railroad north to South Pass City. There are segments of the Oregon, California, Mormon, and Pony Express trails, along with archeological and fossil artifacts.

A westward-looking nation in 1869 united its eastern and western shores with the First transcontinental railroad, whose route traversed the Red Desert. University of Wyoming historian Phil Roberts described the notion of building a transcontinental railroad as "today's equivalent of the mission to Mars: Big, expensive and impossible". The preliminary survey for the railroad produced the first map of the Great Basin and Southern Wyoming, according to author Stephen E. Ambrose. The Red Desert's lack of water presented a problem for steam locomotives of the time. The Union Pacific Company found reliable water by drilling deep artesian wells in the desert. Some of these railroad wells, such as at Wamsutter continue to supply much needed water today for residents and the influx of oil and gas field workers who live in temporary housing or "man camps".

Frontier expansion after the railroad's completion spurred new trade routes such as the New Fork Wagon Road that ran 80 miles (130 km) from Rock Springs, Wyoming, to New Fork. The New Fork Wagon Road connected isolated ranchers and settlements in northern Sweetwater and eastern Sublette Counties. The volume of cargo is evidenced by freighters of the time who were known to hitch as many as 17 horses to haul five freight wagons at once.

The Union Pacific Railroad helped launch western towns along its route, like Wamsutter. Beginning in 1913, the Lincoln Highway connected them. The Lincoln Highway's coast-to-coast route also cut across the Red Desert as it passed through Wyoming. Interstate 80, nearly a half century later in 1956, replaced the Lincoln Highway as America's premier continental roadway. Today, Interstate 80 carries an estimated 11,000 vehicles across the desert daily. The four-lane highway slices the desert into a north and south Red Desert in terms of wildlife migration.

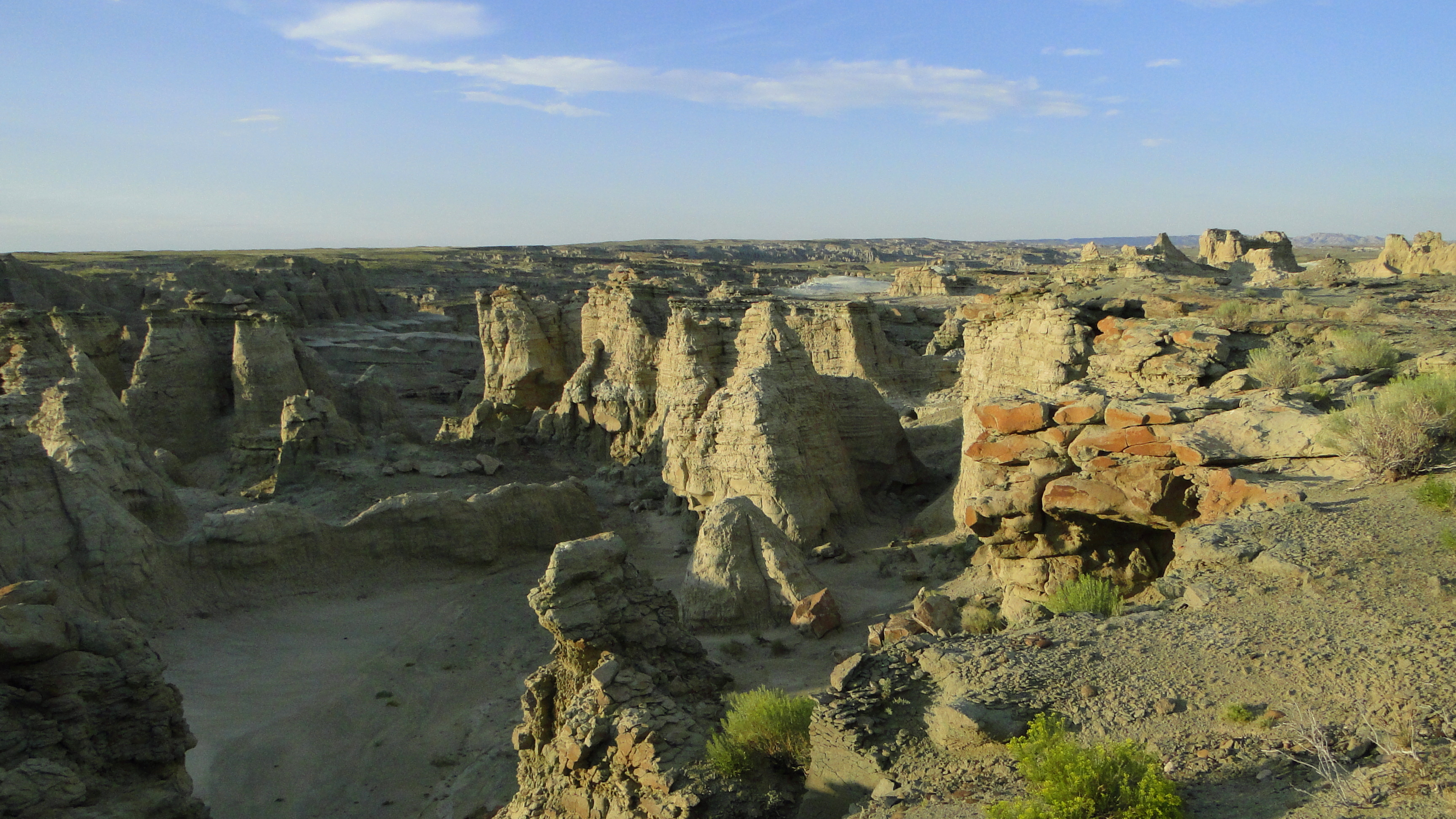
Adobe Town is at the center of conflict between conservationists who want to block the area from natural gas exploration and industry seeking to expand into the region.

Other Expansion Era roads branched off from Union Pacific railheads at Point of Rocks, Green River and Bryan. These trade routes linked remote mining, ranching, and military settlements. Signs of these early trade routes, such as stage stations and freighter camps, are still visible in areas such as Freighter's Gap.

Roadways used by modern-day freighters hauling oilfield supplies have created a spider web of dirt and gravel roads that crisscross the far reaches of the desert. BP, an energy company, reports service people associated with the Wamsutter gas field travel 800,000 miles (1,300,000 km) per month, down from 1,000,000 miles (1,600,000 km). The explosion of natural gas wells drilled during Wyoming's most recent energy industry boom continues with more than 2,000 projected wells in the Wamsutter gas field to be operational by 2020. The gas field encompasses an area in the Red Desert about 55 miles (89 km) long and 35 miles (56 km) wide. Advances in drilling technology now allow grouping of multiple wells on a single drilling pad, thus reducing the footprint upon the land. Meanwhile, BLM expects the expansion in energy development to continue in the Red Desert including the Jack Morrow Hills of 600,000 acres (2,400 km^{2}) near South Pass.

== See also ==
- Wyoming Basin shrub steppe
