= Wyoming Highway 210 =

State highway in Wyoming, United States

Wyoming Highway 210
- Happy Jack Road
- WYO 210 highlighted in red

Route information
- Maintained by WYDOT
- Length: 37.79 mi (60.82 km)

Major junctions
- West end: I-80 / US 30 in Sherman Hill
- WYO 222 west of Cheyenne
- East end: I-25 / US 87 in Cheyenne

Location
- Country: United States
- State: Wyoming
- Counties: Albany, Laramie

Highway system
- Wyoming State Highway System; Interstate; US; State
← WYO 196	→ WYO 211

Wyoming Highway 210 (WYO 210), also known as Happy Jack Road, is a 37.79-mile (60.82 km) state highway in Laramie and Albany counties in Wyoming, United States, that runs from Cheyenne to Interstate 80/U.S. Route 30 (I-80/US 30), 10 miles (16 km) east of Laramie.

== Route description ==
WYO 210 westbound between Cheyenne and Curt Gowdy State Park

WYO 210 begins at Exit 10 on Interstate 25/U.S. Route 87 (I-25/US 87) in Cheyenne. At that interchange, WYO 210 intersects Missile Drive (former Wyoming Highway 226) at 0.16 miles (0.26 km) which provides access to F. E. Warren Air Force Base. WYO 210 then continues west passing south of the airbase, and intersecting Wyoming Highway 222 (Fort Access Road) at 2.94 miles (4.73 km). The Laramie-Albany County Line is at milepost 25.82, and the boundary for Medicine Bow National Forest is at milepost 26.45. WYO 210 ends at 37.79 miles (60.82 km) at the I-80/US 30 interchange (Exit 323) near the State of Wyoming Information Center. WYO 210 passes through Vedauwoo, an area of rocky outcrops located in south-eastern Wyoming. At Curt Gowdy State Park, there are two visible reservoirs that supply water to Cheyenne. Both reside on the south side of Happy Jack Road, Crystal reservoir is the farthest east while Granite it farthest west and visible from the highway.

== Major intersections ==
County	Location	mi	km	Destinations	Notes
Albany		0.00	0.00	I-80 / US 30	Western terminus Exit 323 (I-80/US 30)
Laramie	Cheyenne	2.94	4.73	WYO 222	
Laramie	Cheyenne	37.79	60.82	I-25 / US 87	Eastern terminus Exit 10 (I-25/US 87)
1.000 mi = 1.609 km; 1.000 km = 0.621 mi

== See also ==
- List of state highways in Wyoming
