= Southwest Wyoming Regional Airport =

Airport in Wyoming, United States

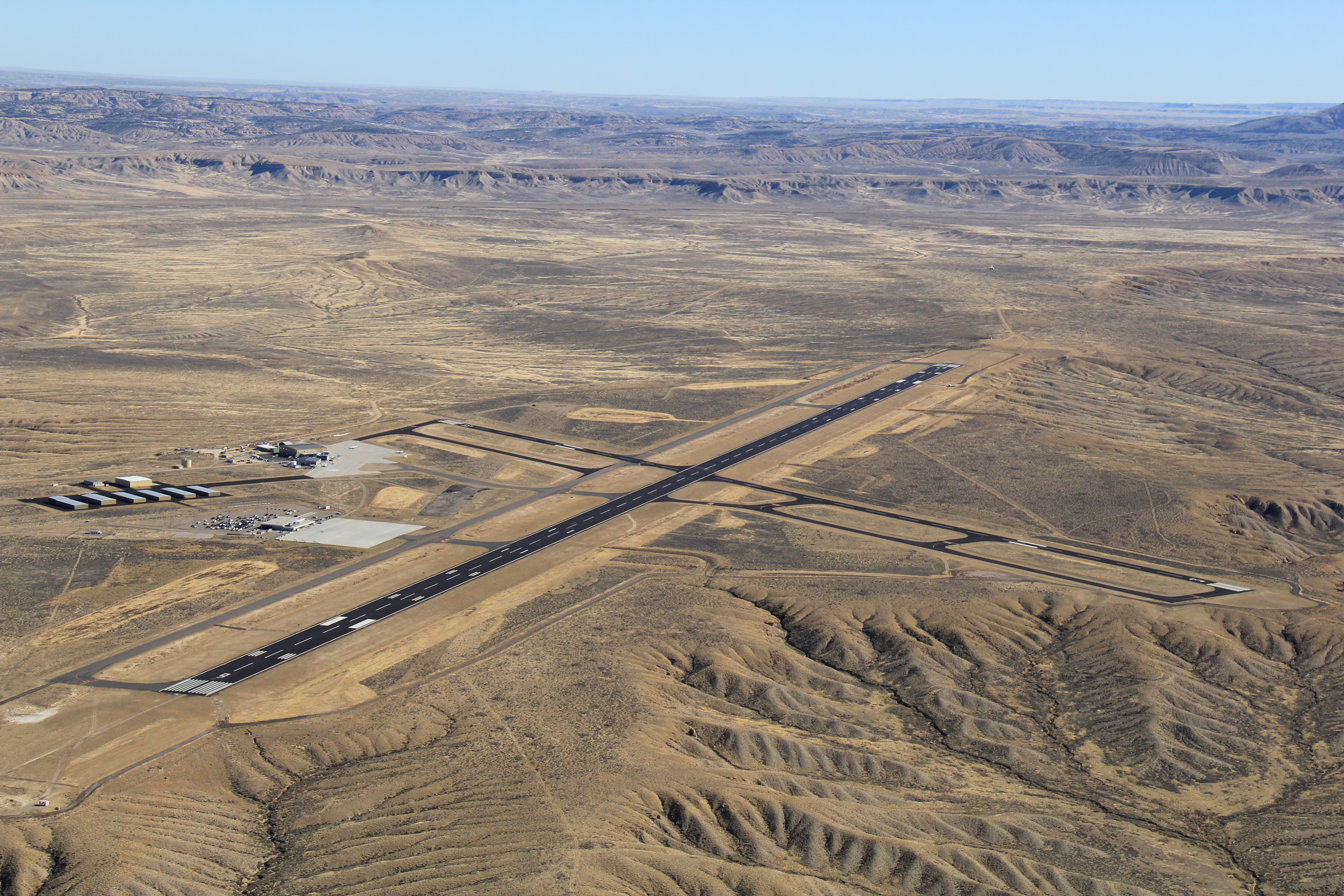
- IATA: RKS; ICAO: KRKS; FAA LID: RKS

Summary
- Airport type: Public
- Owner: City of Rock Springs
- Operator: Rock Spring-Sweetwater County Joint Powers Airport Board
- Serves: Rock Springs, Wyoming
- Elevation AMSL: 6,765 ft (2,062 m)
- Coordinates: 41°35′39″N 109°03′55″W
- Website: FlyRKS.com

Map
- Location within Wyoming Location within the United States

Runways
Direction	Length		Surface
Direction	ft	m	Surface
9/27	10,000	3,048	Asphalt
3/21	5,228	1,593	Asphalt

Statistics (2018)
- Aircraft operations: 16,674
- Based aircraft: 41
- Source: Federal Aviation Administration

Southwest Wyoming Regional Airport (IATA: RKS, ICAO: KRKS, FAA LID: RKS) is eight miles east of Rock Springs, in Sweetwater County, Wyoming, United States. It is operated by the Rock Springs-Sweetwater County Joint Powers Airport Board, with a total of five members, two appointed by the City of Rock Springs and three appointed by Sweetwater County. The airport has twice-daily United Express flights to Denver International Airport.

Sweetwater Aviation is the fixed-base operator, providing all general aviation services on the field.

The National Plan of Integrated Airport Systems for 2019-2023 categorized it as a primary commercial service airport (more than 10,000 enplanements per year).

== Facilities ==
The airport covers 1,242 acres (503 ha) at an elevation of 6,765 feet (2,062 m). It has two asphalt runways: 9/27 is 10,000 by 150 feet (3,048 x 46 m) and 3/21 is 5,228 by 75 feet (1,593 x 23 m). RWY 27 has an ILS and RNAV GPS approach while RWY 9 has a RNAV GPS approach.

The airport's commercial terminal opened in 1978; plans are underway to expand and renovate it.

RKS has over 7 acres of aircraft apron space and offers Aircraft Rescue Fire Fighting services up to Index C.

It has over 130,000 ft^{2} of hangar space including community hangar space large enough to support multiple large cabin corporate aircraft. All facilities are owned by the City of Rock Springs and operated by the Airport Board.

In December 2017, it became the first airport in Wyoming to use a renewable energy power source for part of its electrical demand. The 25 KW solar farm installed by Creative Energies offsets a portion of the electrical demand for the General Aviation Complex operated by Sweetwater Aviation.

== Operations & passenger statistics ==
In 2018 the airport had 16,674 aircraft operations, average 46 per day: 72.2% general aviation, 27.3% air taxi, and <1% military. 41 aircraft were then based at this airport: 85% single-engine, 12% multi-engine, and 2% helicopter, plus 3 ultralight aircraft.

== Airline and destination ==
Airlines	Destinations
United Express	Denver

The airport has one scheduled airline to Denver International Airport, and sees frequent Wendover Fun Casino charter flights.

== Statistics ==
Busiest domestic routes from RKS (March 2021 - February 2022)
Rank	Airport	Passengers	Carrier
1	Denver, Colorado	18,000	United Express

== Climate ==
Climate data for Rock Springs Airport, Wyoming, 1991–2020 normals, 1948-2020 records: 6741ft (2055m)
Month	Jan	Feb	Mar	Apr	May	Jun	Jul	Aug	Sep	Oct	Nov	Dec	Year
Record high °F (°C)	55 (13)	60 (16)	72 (22)	79 (26)	90 (32)	96 (36)	98 (37)	96 (36)	91 (33)	83 (28)	66 (19)	57 (14)	98 (37)
Mean maximum °F (°C)	43.6 (6.4)	47.1 (8.4)	61.1 (16.2)	71.2 (21.8)	79.8 (26.6)	87.9 (31.1)	92.5 (33.6)	90.5 (32.5)	84.4 (29.1)	73.9 (23.3)	58.6 (14.8)	45.9 (7.7)	93.1 (33.9)
Mean daily maximum °F (°C)	29.5 (−1.4)	32.9 (0.5)	43.9 (6.6)	52.8 (11.6)	63.2 (17.3)	75.0 (23.9)	84.1 (28.9)	81.5 (27.5)	70.7 (21.5)	56.0 (13.3)	40.5 (4.7)	29.5 (−1.4)	55.0 (12.7)
Daily mean °F (°C)	21.5 (−5.8)	24.3 (−4.3)	34.0 (1.1)	41.2 (5.1)	50.8 (10.4)	61.0 (16.1)	69.4 (20.8)	67.3 (19.6)	57.3 (14.1)	44.5 (6.9)	31.2 (−0.4)	21.4 (−5.9)	43.7 (6.5)
Mean daily minimum °F (°C)	13.6 (−10.2)	15.7 (−9.1)	24.1 (−4.4)	29.7 (−1.3)	38.4 (3.6)	47.0 (8.3)	54.8 (12.7)	53.1 (11.7)	43.9 (6.6)	32.9 (0.5)	21.8 (−5.7)	13.4 (−10.3)	32.4 (0.2)
Mean minimum °F (°C)	−7.9 (−22.2)	−5.4 (−20.8)	7.3 (−13.7)	16.0 (−8.9)	25.5 (−3.6)	34.3 (1.3)	45.5 (7.5)	42.8 (6.0)	29.6 (−1.3)	15.9 (−8.9)	2.7 (−16.3)	−6.6 (−21.4)	−14.3 (−25.7)
Record low °F (°C)	−37 (−38)	−29 (−34)	−12 (−24)	2 (−17)	14 (−10)	26 (−3)	35 (2)	33 (1)	5 (−15)	−10 (−23)	−13 (−25)	−29 (−34)	−37 (−38)
Average precipitation inches (mm)	0.38 (9.7)	0.37 (9.4)	0.58 (15)	0.91 (23)	1.27 (32)	0.70 (18)	0.47 (12)	0.56 (14)	0.79 (20)	0.81 (21)	0.40 (10)	0.31 (7.9)	7.55 (192)
Average snowfall inches (cm)	8.20 (20.8)	7.90 (20.1)	6.40 (16.3)	8.80 (22.4)	2.70 (6.9)	0.40 (1.0)	0.00 (0.00)	0.00 (0.00)	1.20 (3.0)	6.60 (16.8)	6.00 (15.2)	5.80 (14.7)	54 (137.2)
Source 1: NOAA
Source 2: XMACIS2 (records & monthly max/mins)

== See also ==
- List of airports in Wyoming

== Other sources ==
- Essential Air Service documents (Docket OST-1997-2959) from the U.S. Department of Transportation:
  - Order 2000-5-14 (May 11, 2000): tentatively reselecting Great Lakes Aviation to provide essential air service at Laramie, Rock Springs and Worland, Wyoming, for the two-year period from May 1, 2000 – April 30, 2002, at an annual subsidies of $297,633, for Laramie, $465,023, for Rock Springs, and $353,345 for Worland.
  - Order 2002-7-20 (July 11, 2002): extends the interim subsidy rates of Great Lakes Aviation, Ltd. at each of the communities listed (Page, AZ; Alamosa, CO; Pueblo, CO; Ironwood, MI/Ashland, WI; McCook, NE; Laramie, WY; Rock Springs, WY; Worland, WY; Moab, UT; Vernal, UT).
  - Order 2004-7-16 (July 20, 2004): selects Great Lakes Aviation, Ltd., to provide essential air service with 19-passenger B1900Ds at Laramie, Riverton, Rock Springs, and Worland, Wyoming, for two years for annual subsidy rates of $397,400, $394,046, $390,488, and $797,844, respectively.
  - Order 2006-9-9 (September 11, 2006): re-selecting Great Lakes Aviation, Ltd., operating as both a United Airlines and Frontier code-share partner, to provide subsidized essential air service (EAS) at Laramie and Worland, Wyoming, at an annual subsidy rate of $487,516 for Laramie and $972,757 for Worland, for the two-year period of October 1, 2006, through September 30, 2008. On June 14, 2006, Great Lakes notified the Department that it will continue its existing service at Rock Springs but subsidy-free as of October 1, 2006, the beginning of the new rate-term. On July 24, 2006 Great Lakes notified the Department that it will continue its existing service at Riverton subsidy-free beginning October 1, 2006.
