= Superior, Wyoming =

- Town
- Location of Superior in Sweetwater County, Wyoming
- Coordinates: 41°45′34″N 108°57′51″W
- Country: United States
- State: Wyoming
- County: Sweetwater

Area
  - Total: 1.12 sq mi (2.90 km^{2})
  - Land: 1.12 sq mi (2.90 km^{2})
  - Water: 0 sq mi (0.00 km^{2})
- Elevation: 7,070 ft (2,150 m)

Population (2020)
  - Total: 184
  - Density: 279.0/sq mi (107.74/km^{2})
- Time zone: UTC-7 (Mountain (MST))
  - Summer (DST): UTC-6 (MDT)
- ZIP code: 82945
- Area code: 307
- FIPS code: 56-74775
- GNIS feature ID: 2413355
- Website: superiorwyoming.net

Superior is a town in Sweetwater County, Wyoming, United States. The population was 184 at the 2020 census.

== Geography ==
According to the United States Census Bureau, the town has a total area of 1.10 square miles (2.85 km^{2}), all land.

== Demographics ==
Historical population
| Census | Pop. | Note | %± |
|---|---|---|---|
| 1920 | 1,034 | | — |
| 1930 | 1,156 | | 11.8% |
| 1940 | 1,240 | | 7.3% |
| 1950 | 1,580 | | 27.4% |
| 1960 | 241 | | −84.7% |
| 1970 | 197 | | −18.3% |
| 1980 | 586 | | 197.5% |
| 1990 | 273 | | −53.4% |
| 2000 | 244 | | −10.6% |
| 2010 | 336 | | 37.7% |
| 2020 | 184 | | −45.2% |
U.S. Decennial Census

=== 2010 census ===
As of the census of 2010, there were 336 people, 131 households, and 87 families living in the town. The population density was 305.5 inhabitants per square mile (118.0/km^{2}). There were 181 housing units at an average density of 164.5 per square mile (63.5/km^{2}). The racial makeup of the town was 91.4% White, 0.6% African American, 1.8% Native American, 0.6% Asian, 2.7% from other races, and 3.0% from two or more races. Hispanic or Latino of any race were 12.8% of the population.

There were 131 households, of which 37.4% had children under the age of 18 living with them, 50.4% were married couples living together, 10.7% had a female householder with no husband present, 5.3% had a male householder with no wife present, and 33.6% were non-families. 29.0% of all households were made up of individuals, and 10.6% had someone living alone who was 65 years of age or older. The average household size was 2.56 and the average family size was 3.16.

The median age in the town was 41.3 years. 28% of residents were under the age of 18; 6.6% were between the ages of 18 and 24; 20.3% were from 25 to 44; 34.5% were from 45 to 64; and 10.7% were 65 years of age or older. The gender makeup of the town was 53.6% male and 46.4% female.

=== 2000 census ===
As of the census of 2000, there were 244 people, 92 households, and 67 families living in the town. The population density was 222.1 people per square mile (85.6/km^{2}). There were 153 housing units at an average density of 139.3 per square mile (53.7/km^{2}). The racial makeup of the town was 83.20% White, 2.05% Native American, 0.41% Pacific Islander, 9.02% from other races, and 5.33% from two or more races. Hispanic or Latino of any race were 15.16% of the population.

There were 92 households, out of which 34.8% had children under the age of 18 living with them, 62.0% were married couples living together, 4.3% had a female householder with no husband present, and 26.1% were non-families. 20.7% of all households were made up of individuals, and 1.1% had someone living alone who was 65 years of age or older. The average household size was 2.65 and the average family size was 3.01.

In the town, the population was spread out, with 29.5% under the age of 18, 7.4% from 18 to 24, 29.9% from 25 to 44, 26.6% from 45 to 64, and 6.6% who were 65 years of age or older. The median age was 39 years. For every 100 females, there were 110.3 males. For every 100 females age 18 and over, there were 123.4 males.

The median income for a household in the town was $46,250, and the median income for a family was $50,625. Males had a median income of $56,250 versus $30,833 for females. The per capita income for the town was $17,157. About 6.6% of families and 11.7% of the population were below the poverty line, including 8.9% of those under the age of 18 and none of those 65 or over.

== Education ==
Public education in the town of Superior is provided by Sweetwater County School District #1.

Superior has a public library, a branch of the Sweetwater County Library System.

== Notable people ==
- Richard V. Thomas (1932–2010), Former Wyoming Supreme Court Justice, born in Superior
