= Point of Rocks, Wyoming =

- Unincorporated community
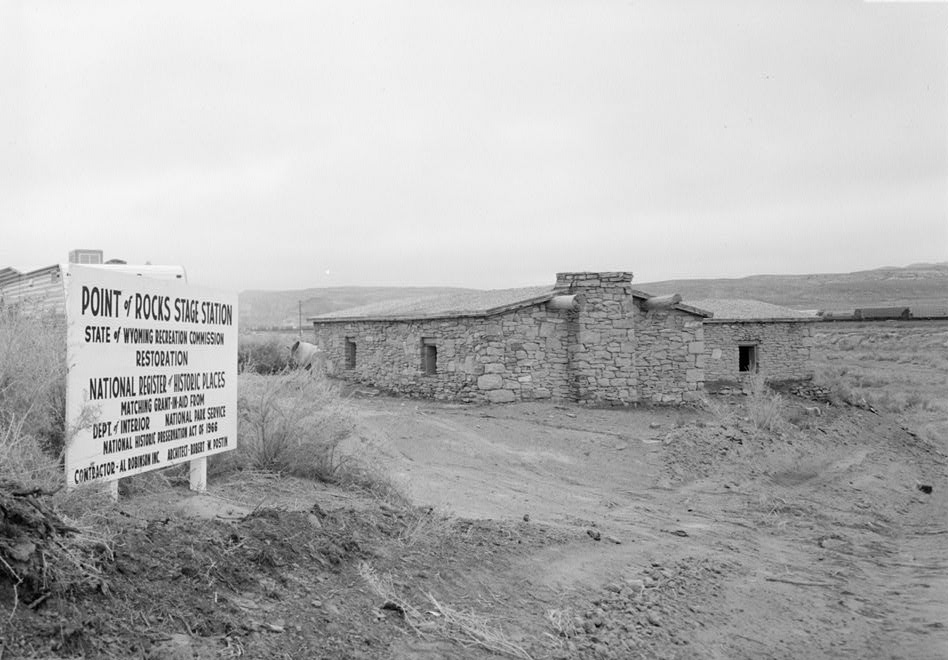
- Almond Stage Station at Point of Rocks, built in 1862

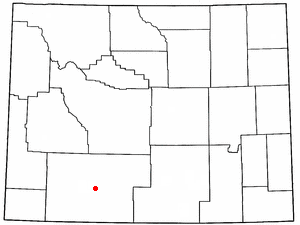
- Location of Point of Rocks, Wyoming
- Coordinates: 41°40′52″N 108°45′35″W
- Country: United States
- State: Wyoming
- County: Sweetwater

Area
  - Total: 1.8 sq mi (4.7 km^{2})
  - Land: 1.8 sq mi (4.7 km^{2})
  - Water: 0 sq mi (0.0 km^{2})
- Elevation: 6,529 ft (1,990 m)

Population (2000)
  - Total: 3
  - Density: 1.6/sq mi (0.6/km^{2})
- Time zone: UTC-7 (Mountain (MST))
  - Summer (DST): UTC-6 (MDT)
- ZIP code: 82942
- Area code: 307
- FIPS code: 56-62160
- GNIS feature ID: 2409083

Point of Rocks is an unincorporated community in Sweetwater County, Wyoming, United States. As of the 2000 census, Point of Rocks had a total population of three, when it was a census-designated place (CDP).

== Geography ==
According to the United States Census Bureau, in 2000 the CDP has a total area of 1.8 square miles (4.7 km^{2}), all land.

== Demographics ==
As of the census of 2000, there were three people, two households, and one family residing in the CDP. The population density was 1.6 people per square mile (0.6/km^{2}). There were two housing units at an average density of 1.1/sq mi (0.4/km^{2}). All residents were white and between forty-five and sixty-four. The median age was sixty-three years.

One household was a married couple living together, while the other was a male individual.

The median income for a household in the CDP was $41,250, and the median income for a family was $41,250. The per capita income for the CDP was $21,050.

== Education ==
Public education in Point of Rocks is provided by Sweetwater County School District #1.

== Jim Bridger Power Station ==
Point of Rocks is home to the Jim Bridger Power Station. The 2,110 megawatt facility jointly owned by PacifiCorp (2/3 owner and operator of the plant), and Idaho Power (1/3 owner), and is one of the largest coal-fired electric power generation facilities in the western United States.

This plant is connected to the grid by numerous 500kv transmission lines.

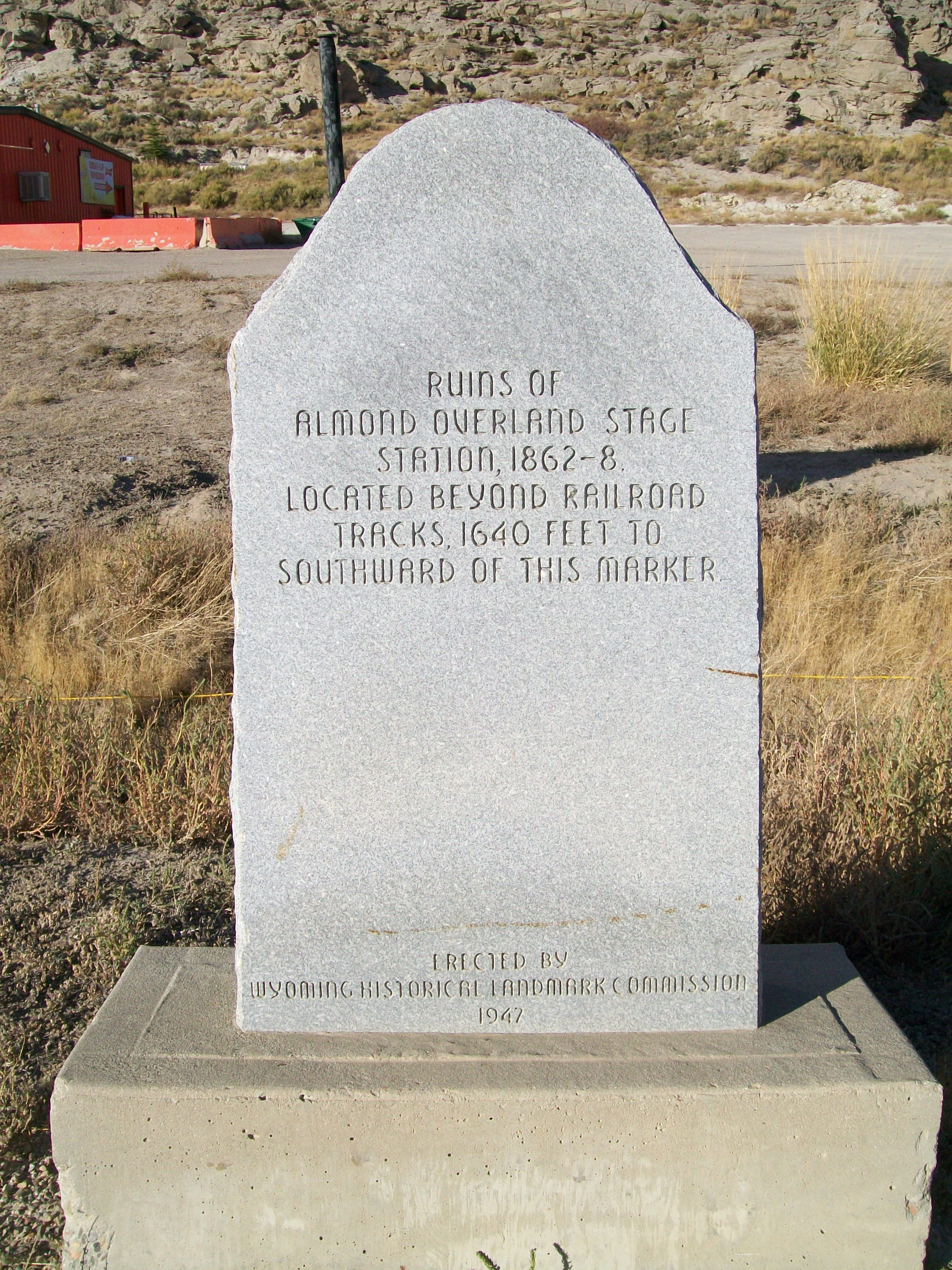
The Monument to the Almond Stage Station located in Point of Rocks, WY.

== Almond Stage Station ==
Also located in Point of Rocks are the remnants of the original Almond Stage Station, built in 1862 at the behest of Ben Holladay. Holladay wished to move his stage coach line further south because of repeated attacks by Indians. The station was constructed of local sandstone with a sod-covered roof, which allowed it to survive at least one attack and attempted burning. In 1868, the station was converted to a stop along the transcontinental railroad and the Overland Trail. When mining declined in the area the station was sold and used as a private home before being absorbed by the Wyoming State Parks and restored. The Point of Rocks Stage Station was never used as a Pony Express stop at any time and was not even on the route of the Pony Express.
