= National Register of Historic Places listings in Sublette County, Wyoming =

Location of Sublette County in Wyoming

This is a list of the National Register of Historic Places listings in Sublette County, Wyoming. It is intended to be a complete list of the properties and districts on the National Register of Historic Places in Sublette County, Wyoming, United States. The locations of National Register properties and districts for which the latitude and longitude coordinates are included below, may be seen in a map.

There are 25 properties and districts listed on the National Register in the county, one of which is a National Historic Landmark.

This National Park Service list is complete through NPS recent listings posted August 21, 2026.

Contents: Counties in Wyoming
Albany - Big Horn - Campbell - Carbon - Converse - Crook - Fremont - Goshen - Hot Springs - Johnson - Laramie - Lincoln - Natrona - Niobrara - Park - Platte - Sheridan - Sublette - Sweetwater - Teton - Uinta - Washakie - Weston

== Current listings ==
	Name on the Register	Image	Date listed	Location	City or town	Description
1	Archeological Site No. 48SU354		May 13, 1994 (#94000439)	Address restricted	Big Piney vicinity	Rock shelter (also known as the Calpet Rockshelter) and nine petroglyph panels, showing evidence of use by the Fremont culture, pre- and post-contact Shoshone, and Euro-Americans.
2	Big Sandy Lodge		November 13, 2023 (#100009516)	1050 Mud Lake Rd. 42°40′57″N 109°16′49″W	Boulder vicinity	Guest ranch established as a fishing camp in 1930 by mountaineer and area promoter Finis Mitchell (1901–1995); largely unchanged since a 1950s expansion.
3	Church of St. Hubert the Hunter and Library	Church of St. Hubert the Hunter and Library	January 24, 2002 (#01001525)	14254 U.S. Routes 189/191; 43°12′05″N 110°24′23″W	Bondurant	Log church (built 1940–41) and library (built 1943) serving as the primary meeting and social spaces in a community with no central commercial district, and an emergency shelter in an area often closed by blizzards.
4	Circle Ranch	Circle Ranch	May 14, 1987 (#87000778)	279 Miller Ln. 42°31′18″N 110°10′53″W	Big Piney	One of western Wyoming's earliest and most successful ranches, established in 1878, with 11 contributing properties including its original homestead cabins and a 1905 main house reflecting its rising fortunes.
5	Cora Townsite	Cora Townsite	April 24, 2017 (#100000925)	5 Noble Rd. 42°56′22″N 109°58′41″W	Cora	Largely unaltered village established in 1919 as the nucleus of a ranching community, with 10 contributing properties noted for their fine log architecture by tie hacks, including a long-serving U.S. post office.
6	Craig Cabin		September 19, 2016 (#16000648)	Forest Rd. 30650A; 43°14′26″N 110°16′13″W	Bondurant vicinity	Log cabin and outbuilding constructed c. 1898–1900 by fur trappers, occupied 1902–1939 by a placer miner, and used since the mid-20th century by outfitters—encapsulating three key economic activities in Wyoming settlement.
7	Daniel School	Daniel School	September 5, 1990 (#90001387)	18 School House Ln. 42°51′53″N 110°04′33″W	Daniel	1920 one-room school with its outhouses and hand pump; representing the upgraded facilities constructed in the early 20th century to replace ad hoc log buildings as the venues for education in Sublette County's sparsely populated ranching communities.
8	DDZ Bridge over New Fork River	DDZ Bridge over New Fork River	February 22, 1985 (#85000437)	County Road 136; 42°45′01″N 109°43′45″W	Boulder	Unique two-span king post truss bridge built in 1917, nominated as Wyoming's most sophisticated remaining wooden truss bridge. Replaced in 1989.
9	Dunham Place		August 10, 2026 (#100010712)	285 Dunham Rd. 42°40′27″N 110°01′29″W	Big Piney vicinity	Working ranch encapsulating the stages of local agriculture, evolving from a 1911 homestead into a family-owned ranch, then tenant and satellite ranch of larger operations, yet atypically continuing to use all log architecture in its 15 contributing properties up through 1974.
10	ENP Bridge over Green River	ENP Bridge over Green River	February 22, 1985 (#85000438)	County Road CN23-145; 42°46′46″N 109°58′10″W	Pinedale vicinity	Wyoming's last remaining example of a few unusual pin-connected Pratt truss bridges that included both a through span and a pony span; built circa 1905.
11	Emerson School		August 4, 2025 (#100012057)	342 East Fork Big Sandy Rd. 42°37′05″N 109°30′20″W	Boulder vicinity	Well-preserved example of a log one-room school, in service 1917–1943 and 1950–1959 as the primary venue for education and social events in a dispersed ranching community.
12	Father DeSmet's Prairie Mass Site	Father DeSmet's Prairie Mass Site	April 28, 1970 (#70000676)	DeSmet Rd. 42°52′03″N 110°02′36″W	Daniel vicinity	Site where Pierre-Jean De Smet (1801–1873) conducted Mass for an audience of 2,000 on July 5, 1840; one of the first Christian services held in the Rocky Mountains, and a symbol of the missionary movement in the American West and one of its leading figures.
13	Fort Bonneville	Fort Bonneville	April 28, 1970 (#70000677)	Wyoming Highway 354; 42°53′35″N 110°08′11″W	Daniel vicinity	Site of an 1832 fort where Benjamin Bonneville's expedition planned to spend the winter, but hastily abandoned due to heavy snows. Notable as the first fixed trading post in the region. Marked with a 1915 monument.
14	Green River Drift Trail Traditional Cultural Property		November 22, 2013 (#12001224)	Generally follows upper Green River; 42°52′52″N 109°59′21″W	Cora vicinity	58-mile (93 km) stock drift trail with 41 miles (66 km) of spur trails, used since the 1890s to move cattle between seasonal grazing allotments and private land. Significant in the development and operation of local ranches and their relations with federal land management agencies.
15	Jensen Ranch		May 5, 1988 (#88000552)	Martin Jensen Rd. 42°38′22″N 109°31′30″W	Boulder vicinity	Ranch founded in 1905, with 10 contributing properties exemplifying the early-20th-century pioneer ranches established on isolated, marginal rangeland once the more desirable areas had been claimed.
16	Lander Road-New Fork River Crossing		January 17, 2017 (#100000525)	1371 Paradise Rd. 42°36′49″N 109°51′02″W	Boulder vicinity	River crossing and camp site on the 1857 Lander Cutoff, with archaeological traces of the overland settlement of the American West. Preserved as a public park in 2010.
17	Log Cabin Motel	Log Cabin Motel	March 25, 1993 (#93000230)	49 E. Magnolia St. 42°52′04″N 109°51′37″W	Pinedale	One of Wyoming's few intact examples of a cabin camp, with seven contributing properties built in 1929 as automobile tourism to Yellowstone National Park began bringing visitors through Pinedale.
18	New Fork	New Fork	July 16, 1987 (#87000773)	3 miles south of Boulder on U.S. Route 191; 42°42′12″N 109°42′55″W	New Fork	Townsite with eight contributing properties built 1888–1910 in frontier style, representing a late-19th/early-20th-century rural commercial center patronized by overland emigrants, Native Americans, and ranchers.
19	Redick Lodge		March 18, 1983 (#83003364)	Fremont Lake; 42°59′32″N 109°48′11″W	Pinedale vicinity	Private summer estate built 1920–1924 in a wilderness setting, exemplifying the most privileged form of early tourism in the area, as well as fine Western Craftsman architecture.
20	Sommers Ranch Headquarters Historic District		June 18, 2009 (#09000454)	734 County Road 23-110; 42°46′45″N 109°57′46″W	Pinedale vicinity	Well-preserved example of the small ranches grown from homesteads established in the Green River Valley, with 18 contributing properties built 1908–1957. Became the Sommers Homestead Living History Museum in 2010.
21	Steele Homestead		April 25, 1985 (#85000870)	534 Wyoming Highway 353; 42°45′21″N 109°37′11″W	Boulder vicinity	One of Sublette County's best preserved early family-owned ranches, with 14 contributing properties built 1886–1908, exemplifying Wyoming's ranch-driven settlement pattern and architecture.
22	Trappers Point Site	Trappers Point Site	May 14, 2007 (#07000368)	6 miles (10 km) west of Pinedale; 42°52′34″N 109°56′45″W	Pinedale vicinity	Holocene-spanning archaeological site including the earliest known evidence for the mass killing and processing of pronghorns and a diverse projectile point assemblage, providing particularly significant insights into the early Archaic period.
23	Union Pass	Union Pass	April 16, 1969 (#69000367)	Union Pass Rd. 43°27′44″N 109°53′02″W	Dunoir vicinity	Mountain pass near a triple divide, providing easy routes among the drainage basins of three major rivers. Long used by Native Americans, followed by American explorers and fur traders such as the 1811 Astor Expedition. Extends into Fremont County.
24	Upper Green River Rendezvous Site	Upper Green River Rendezvous Site	October 15, 1966 (#66000763)	On the Green River above and below Daniel; 42°51′59″N 110°04′17″W	Daniel	1,200-acre (490 ha) expanse where eight of the 15 Rocky Mountain Rendezvous were held 1825–1840.
25	Wardell Buffalo Trap	Wardell Buffalo Trap	August 12, 1971 (#71000892)	Address restricted	Big Piney vicinity	Region's oldest known game drive system at which bows and arrows were used; employed in a box canyon over 500 years during the Late Prehistoric period.

== See also ==
- List of National Historic Landmarks in Wyoming
- National Register of Historic Places listings in Wyoming
