= New Fork =

New Fork can refer to either:

- New Fork River, a tributary of the Green River in Wyoming
- New Fork, Wyoming, a ghost town
