= Eliza Hart Spalding =

American missionary (1807–1851)

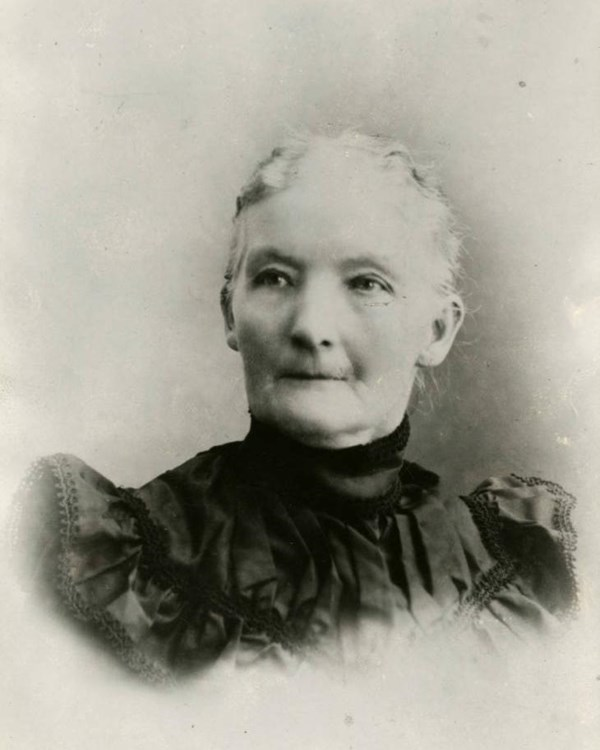
- Born: Eliza Hart; August 11, 1807; In what is now Berlin, Connecticut
- Died: January 7, 1851 (aged 43); Near Brownsville, Oregon
- Other name: Mrs. Henry Spalding
- Occupation: Missionary to the Nez Perce people - American pioneer
- Spouse: Henry H. Spalding

Eliza Hart Spalding (1807–1851) was an American missionary who joined an Oregon missionary party with her husband Henry H. Spalding and settled among the Nez Perce People called the nimiipuu in Lapwai, Idaho. She was a well-educated woman who was among the first missionaries to learn a Native American language. She developed a written version of the language and printed Bible story lessons and hymns in the Nez Perce language. Her hymnal was the first book written in the Nez Perce language. She taught hundreds of native people by first teaching a few people a lesson or a song, and after they memorized it, they taught it to groups to people.

== Early life ==
Eliza Hart was born in what is now the town of Berlin, Connecticut on August 11, 1807 to Captain Levi and Martha Hart. Her father was a farmer and may have been a captain in the local militia. The oldest of six children, she had three brothers and two sisters. Her family moved to Oneida County, New York in 1820 and lived on a farm near the village of Holland Patent. She learned to make cheese, butter, candles, and soap. She was able to spin thread and weave fabric. She also learned to draw and paint as a child.

She attended Chipman Female Academy. Located in Clinton, New York, it was about 20 miles from her family's farm. She is also said to have taught school. Deeply and nearly mystically religious, she joined the Presbyterian Church of Holland Patent on August 20, 1826.

== Marriage and children ==
A mutual friend connected Henry H. Spalding, who was seeking a pious woman, with Eliza Hart. A student at Franklin Academy in Prattsburgh, New York, Henry began corresponding with Eliza in 1830. One year later, he enrolled at Hamilton College in Clinton, but transferred to Western Reserve College in Hudson, Ohio, where other students receiving aid from the American Education Society felt more accord with the school. She married Henry in Hudson on October 13, 1833, becoming Eliza Hart Spalding.

After attended a women's seminary in New York and a year at a school in Hudson, Ohio. Spalding also studied Greek and Hebrew at Lane Theological Seminary during Henry's two years of study there. During Spalding's first pregnancy, her baby was delivered stillborn. She became ill after the birth which prevented the couple from taking a missionary appointment to work with the Osage Nation in the present state of Kansas. They had four more children born by 1846, Eliza, born in November 1837; Henry Hart; Martha Jane; and Amelia Lorene. Her daughter Eliza was the first white child born in Idaho. They also brought eight Nez Perce children into their family.

In the Spring of 1838, after she had become a mother, Spalding made a commitment with fellow missionary Narcissa Whitman to spend the hour between 9 and 10 a.m. "to seek divine assistance discharging the responsible duties of mothers and for the early conversion of our children." This practice helped her feel connected to Whitman, who lived in Washington, and maintained the cultural practices she learned as she grew up about motherhood. In September 1838, Spalding, Whitman, and the newly arrived women missionaries—Myra Eells, Mary Walker, Mary Gray, and Sarah Smith—formed the Columbia Maternal Association. (Note: Maternal associations were popular between the 1820s and 1840s. By the 1830s they were among the largest associations in America.)

== Missionary ==
=== Journey ===
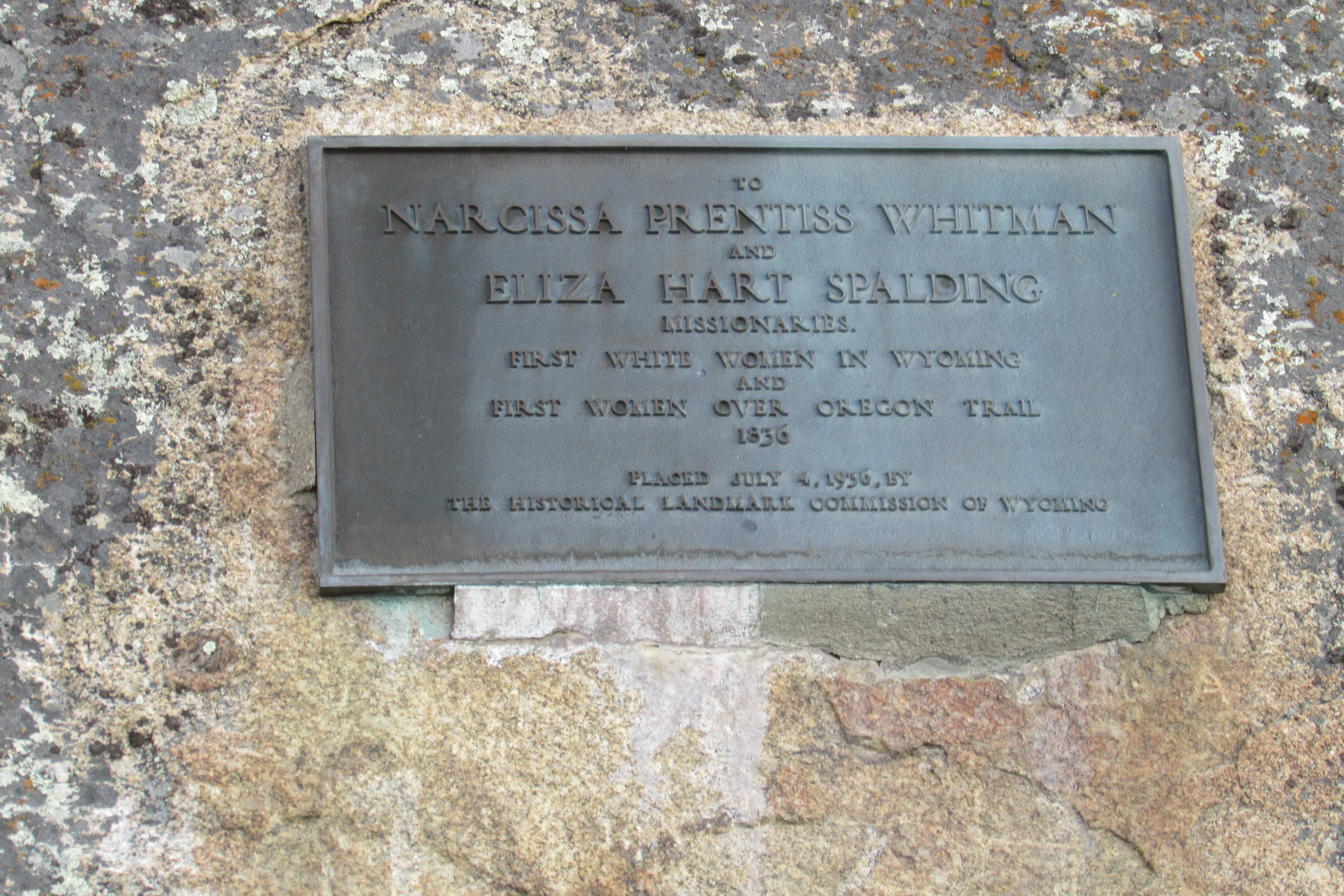
To Narcissa Prentiss Whitman and Eliza Hart Spalding, Missionaries. First White women in Wyoming and first women over Oregon trail, 1836. Placed July 4, 1956, by The Historical Landmark Commission of Wyoming.

The Spaldings joined a Presbyterian missionary party bound for Oregon Country (a large region of the Pacific Northwest) in the winter of 1835. They traveled by wagon train with fellow missionaries Narcissa and Marcus Whitman, who settled near the Walla Walla River, and William Henry Gray for the American Board of Commissioners for Foreign Missions (ABCFM). They were led and protected by fur traders from the Hudson's Bay Company and the American Fur Company. The Hudson's Bay Company forts sold supplies to the missionaries over the course of their journey. With Narcissa, the two were the first white women to cross the Continental Divide. (Note: There were some women and children who traveled to the Western United States earlier, but they traveled by ship around South America.) Two markers pay tribute to the women, one near Daniel, Wyoming at the site of the Green River Rendezvous, where they were the first white female attendees from July 6 to July 18, 1836, and another along the Oregon Trail at Independence Rock near Casper, Wyoming.

=== Establish mission ===
The Spaldings arrived at their mission site on November 29, 1836. Initially they settled along Lapwai Creek, where they first lived in tipis while their first house was built. It was the first mission in Idaho. In January 1837, Spalding began teaching and Henry began preaching to the Nez Perce People. Her husband introduced irrigation farming, making the area the first agricultural settlement in Idaho.

Spalding acclimated to a lifestyle that was remote and in many ways cut off from her family in the east. At that time, the Pacific Northwest was not part of the United States and it could take eight months to a year for a letter to be conveyed between their mission and relatives in the east. It generally took two years for Spalding to have sent on a letter and to have heard back from family in New York. Mail traveled either by a ship around South America or via fur traders or other caravans west of Liberty, Missouri. The Whitman's mission was 120 miles from the Spalding's mission, a trip of five or six days during good weather to visit their fellow missionaries. Missionary societies sent them barrels filled with books, clothing, school supplies, and other useful materials. They also received letters and packages from people who were aware of their mission, including poet Lydia Sigourney, which helped them feel supported by people in the east.

=== Educator ===
Spalding was the first of the missionaries to learn a Native language, the Nez Perce language, which allowed her to assimilate more quickly with the Nez Perce People and translate their language to English when needed. Until that point, it was only a spoken language. Spalding created a written version of the language and taught it to the Nez Perce people, along with English.

External image
- Pictorial ladder of Biblical History, Christian History Institute

She printed Bible story lessons and hymns in the Nez Perce language. Her hymnal was the first book written in the Nez Perce language. Hundreds of people—men, women and children— showed up for school and she was unable to teach them all, so she developed a system where she taught a Bible story, Bible verse, or a song to a few Nez Perce, who memorized it and then taught it to groups of people. Spalding and Henry developed a pictorial ladder with comments in English to help teach the stories of God and biblical figures.

She taught girls to knit, sew, and weave cloth, using the first weaving loom west of the Rocky Mountains. They knitted socks and sewed dresses. Spalding did not attempt to force the children to assimilate European habits of hair cuts, clothing, or grooming.

She is considered an artist on the western frontier for her skills of an illustrator, storyteller, knitter, letterwriter, and publisher, as stated in the Frontier Women and Their Art: A Chronological Encyclopedia.

=== Relationships ===
She asked for and accepted help from the nimiipuu, such as help with the delivery of her daughter, Eliza, in November 1837. She felt it was important to learn from the native people before asking them to change. She sought to understand the Nez Perce, while her husband sought for the Nez Perce to understand him and his strict rules about liquour, polygamy, and gambling. His punishments were to whip the native people or have them whip each other. While her husband could be "ridiculed and denounced", Spalding was appreciated by the Nez Perce, who saw that she tried to soothe her husband's temper. She was also calm and clear-headed during fearful and unsettling events.

Once, when she had been sick for a long time and we all feared that she would never recover, the Indians were most solicitous, and never a day passed that they did not ask about her condition. One of the old chiefs used to sit by her bedside and watch her quietly. He broke his stolid reserve at one time, and in his broken Indian manner said to her: 'Oh, that I might be taken in your place and you could be spared to teach my people!'

— Eliza Spalding Warren, daughter of Eliza Spalding

The Nez Perce women liked to shadow Spalding as she did her chores to see how a white woman cleaned, cooked, and dressed and cared for their children. They also helped care for her children as she did household chores. One time the Nez Perce threatened to kill one of their men who insulted her, but changed their minds when Spalding asked them to spare his life. She asked that he be allowed to repent of his sin and become a better person.

Eliza's greatest contribution to the Oregon Mission, to the Nez Perce people, and to her own society, was her unceasing efforts to break down the barriers between the races and to bring two unlike people closer together.

— Deborah Dawson Bonde

=== Growth of the mission ===
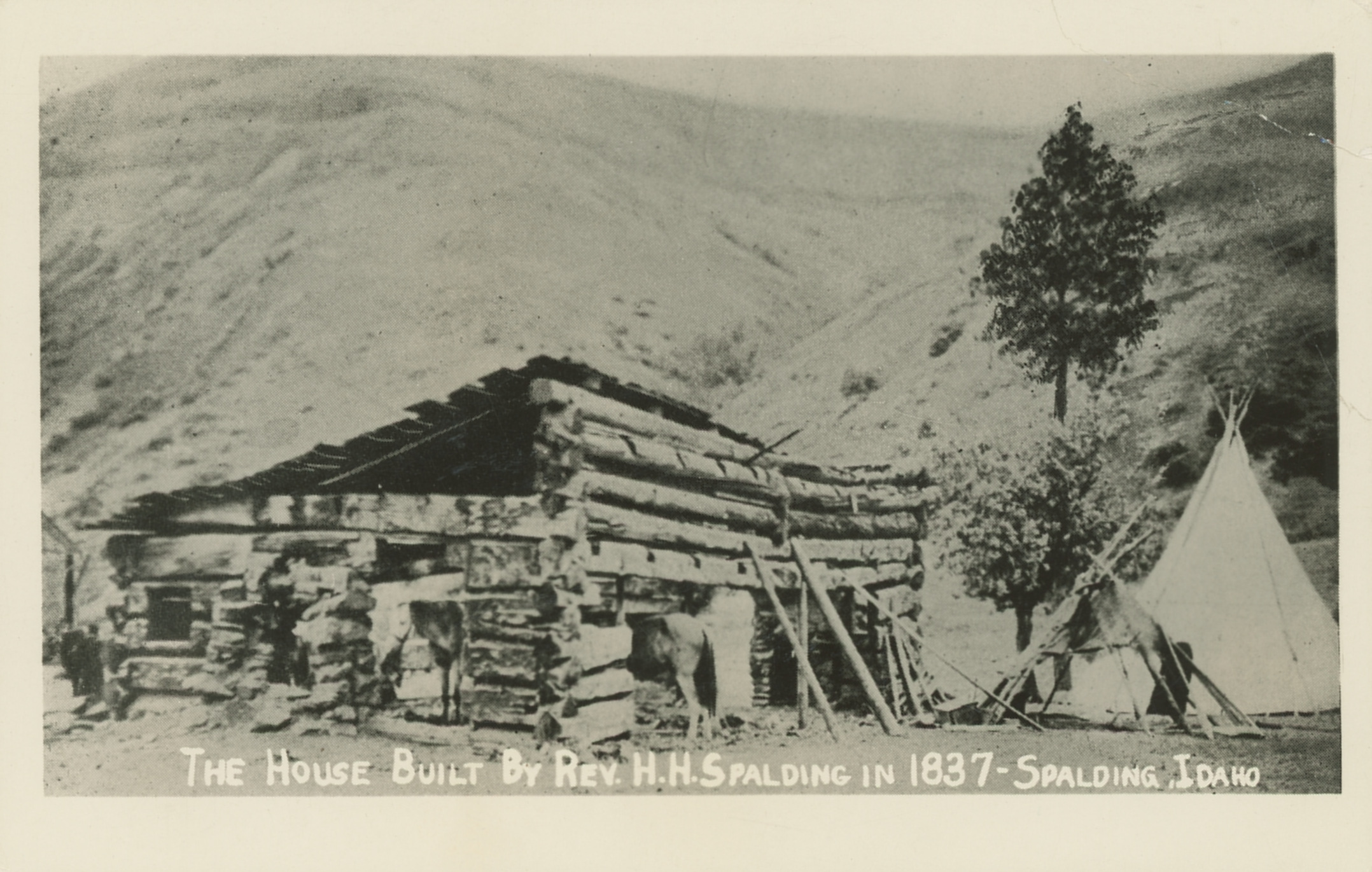
Spalding House

Within the first six months, Spalding adopted eight Nez Perce children into their family. The log mission building, part living quarters and part mission school and church, was completed on December 23, 1836, with the assistance of the Nez Perce people.

In 1838, the Spaldings decided to move five miles away to a cooler spot with fewer mosquitos. They settled amongst the nimiipuu, the Nez Perce People in Lapwai along the Clearwater River, in what is now the state of Idaho. The Nez Perce People helped the Spaldings build a log house that was expanded three times to provide additional space for mission and school activities. They also had a printing house to publish Nez Perce language primers and hymn books. They boarded children at the mission.

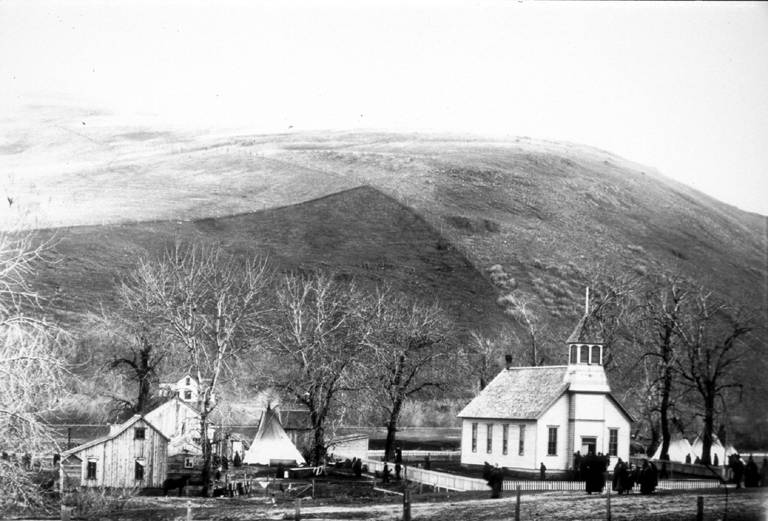
Spalding Mission, ca. 1880

The mission grew to become the first white settlement in Idaho, with a blacksmith shop, two schools, student dormitories, a meeting house, two print-shops, a spinning and weaving shop, a summer kitchen, other outbuildings. It had 44 acres of cultivated land with 146 horses, pigs and cows.

Missionaries William Henry and Mary Gray periodically lived at Lapwai, traveling back and forth from Waiilatpu in what is now the state of Washington. Annual meetings were conducted at the Whitman's or Spalding's mission, including subsequent missionaries who were stationed in Washington and Idaho.

=== Leave the mission ===
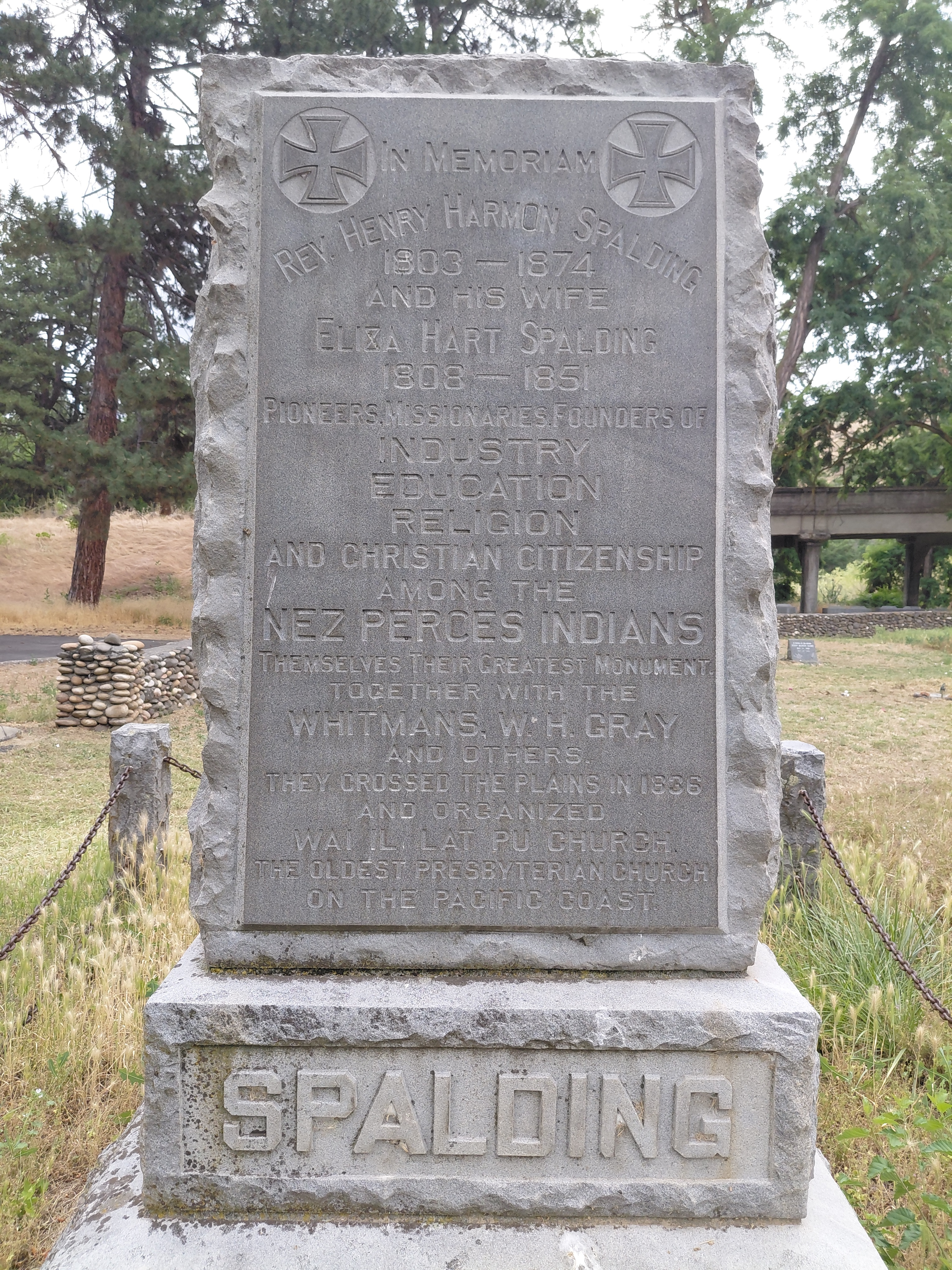
Eliza Spalding's grave at the Spalding Cemetery in Lapwai

In late November 1847, the weyíiletpuu mission station was attacked by the nimiipuu people. Native friends at Lapwai, including leaders Timothy and Thunder Eyes, helped protect the Spaldings. Marcus and Narcissa Whitman were killed in Walla Walla at the Whitman mission. The Spaldings stayed at the home of Mr. and Mrs. A.T. Smith until the summer or fall of 1848. In 1848, the Spaldings moved to Willamette Valley, in what is now Oregon. (Note: The Nez Perce County Museum states that the Spaldings left in 1847.) They settled on a claim near Brownsville along the Calapooia River. In 1848, Spalding was hired as the first teacher of Tualatin Academy.

== Death ==
Eliza Spalding died of tuberculosis near Brownsville, Oregon on January 7, 1851. Her tombstone, among other sentiments, was engraved with words from Henry: "Mrs. Spalding was respected and esteemed by all, and no one had greater or better influence over the Indians".

Henry returned to Lapwai in 1862 to teach. He was buried there after his death in 1874. Spalding's remains were moved and interred next to her husband at the Spalding Cemetery in Lapwai, located within the Nez Perce National Historical Park. The cemetery is also called the Lapwai Mission Cemetery and is located near the Spalding Mission.

== Spalding Mission site ==
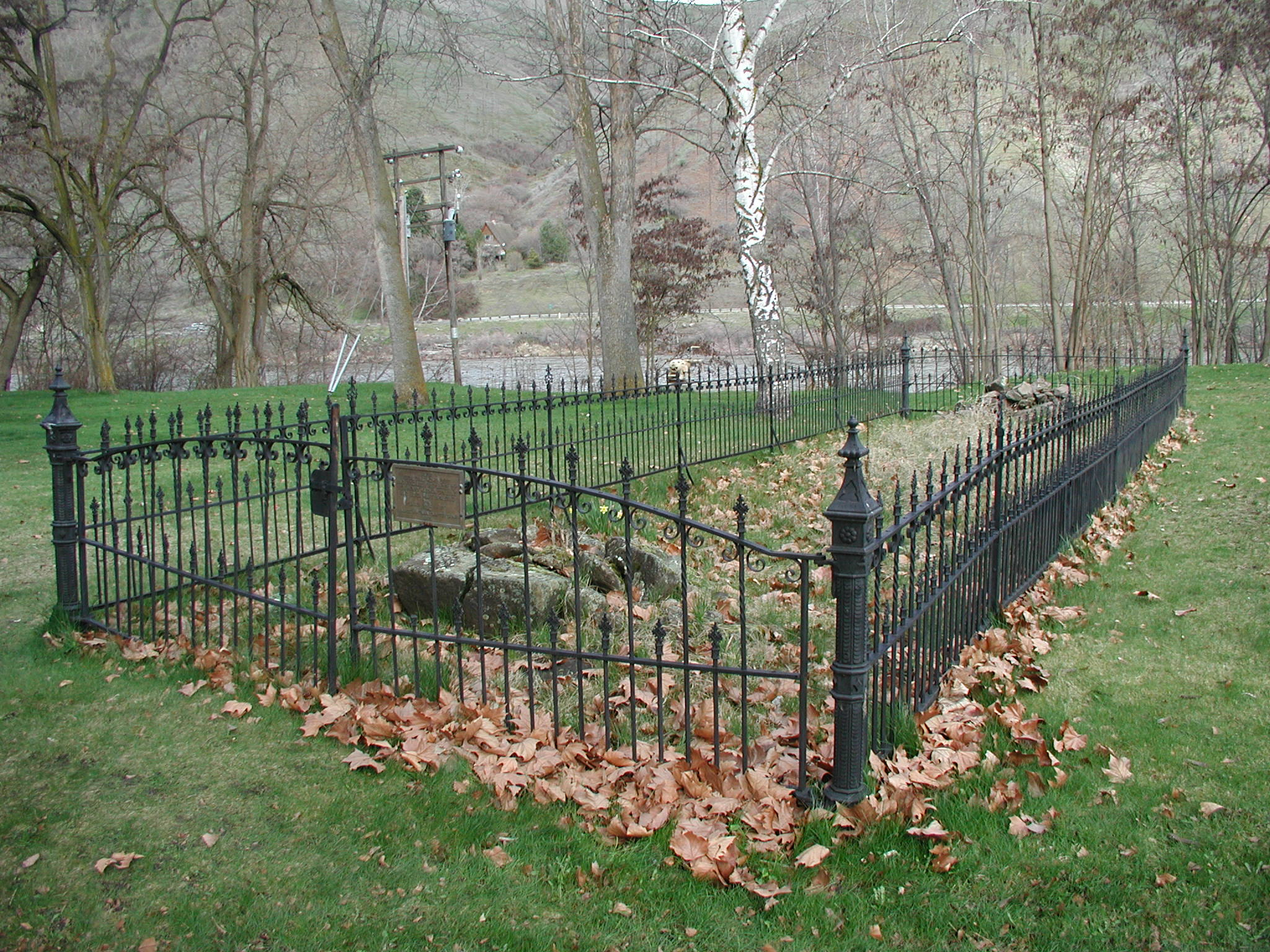
Spalding Mission Site. Only the foundations are preserved. The site is part of Nez Perce National Historical Park.

A tablet was installed by the Daughters of the American Revolution (DAR) in 1923 that commemorated the Spalding Mission, near Watson's Store Road and 403 Road in Spalding, Idaho (Coordinates 46°27′4″N 116°48′55″W). Spalding was named for Spalding's husband Henry. A marker was also placed at the nearby Spalding Home Site.

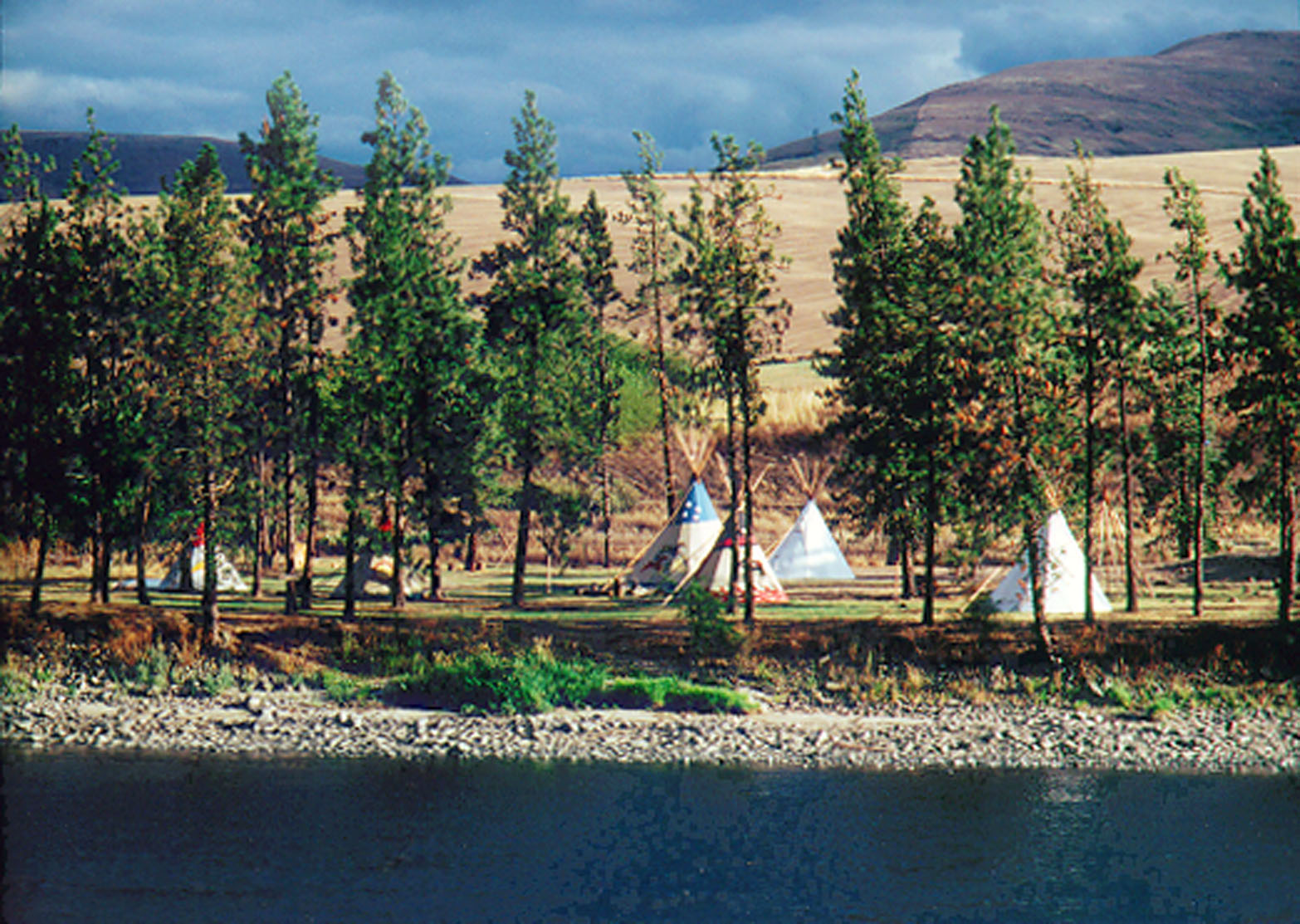
Tipis near Nez Perce National Historical Park in Spalding, Idaho. Traditional tipis dot the landscape of the Nez Perce Indian Reservation.

The DAR lobbied the state for the mission site to become a memorial park, which was established as Spalding Memorial State Park in 1936. A memorial grove of trees was designed by W.S. Thornber, the Idaho Bureau of Highways landscape engineer. Twenty-two species remain, including, pine, spruce, oak, and sequoia trees. Since 1965, it is now part of the Nez Perce National Historical Park. The site was excavated by University of Idaho archaeologiests in 1974.

== Sources ==
- Bonde, Deborah Dawson (1991). "Missionary Ways in the Wilderness: Eliza Hart Spalding, Maternal Associations, and the Nez Perce Indians". American Presbyterians. 69 (4): 271–282. ISSN 0886-5159. JSTOR 23332703.
- Drury, Clifford M. (1961). "The First White Women Over the Rockies". Journal of the Presbyterian Historical Society (1943–1961). 39 (1): 1–13. ISSN 0147-3735. JSTOR 23325270.
- Whitman, Narcissa Prentiss (1997). Where Wagons Could Go: Narcissa Whitman and Eliza Spalding. University of Nebraska Press. ISBN 978-0-8032-6606-3.
