= Fort Bonneville =

Historic site in Sublette County, Wyoming, United States

- U.S. National Register of Historic Places
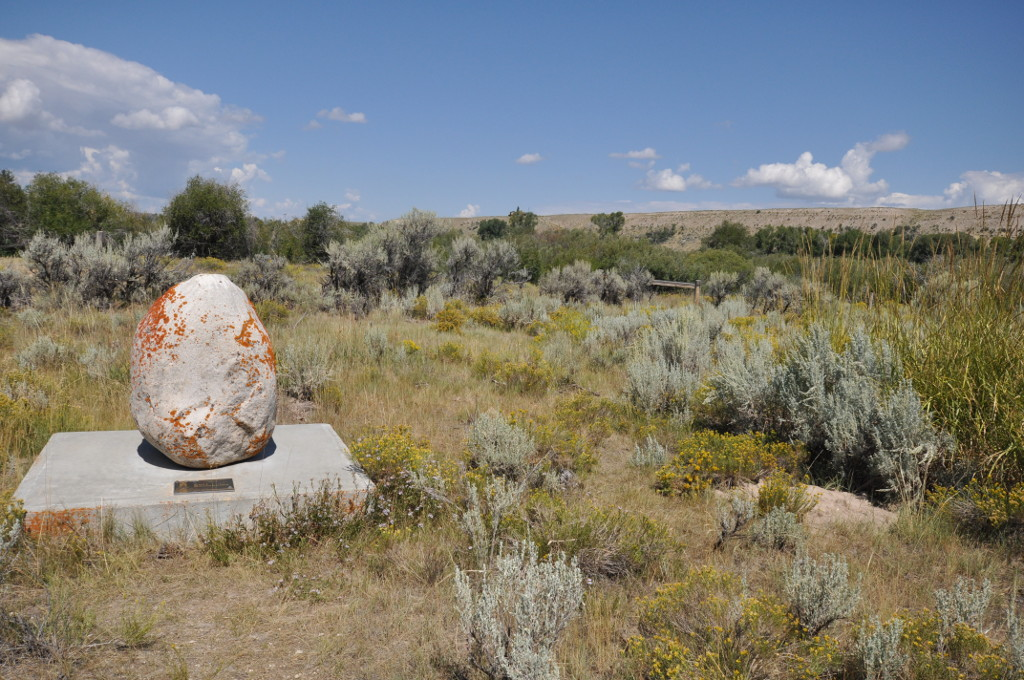

- Location within Wyoming Location within the United States
- Nearest city: Pinedale, Wyoming
- Coordinates: 42°53′40″N 110°8′3″W
- Area: less than one acre
- Built: 1832
- Architect: Bonneville party
- NRHP reference No.: 70000677
- Added to NRHP: April 28, 1970

Fort Bonneville is the site of a former fort along the Green River in Sublette County, Wyoming, United States, that is listed on the National Register of Historic Places.

== Description ==
The site is located along Wyoming Highway 354, immediately northwest of the census-designated place of Daniel. The former fort was a fortified winter camp and fur trading post near present-day Pinedale, Wyoming established in 1832 by Captain Benjamin Bonneville. Bonneville's party was engaged in the exploration of Wyoming, crossing the South Pass with 110 men and about 20 wagons. Bonneville completed the stockade on the Green River on August 9, 1832. Heavy fall snows caused Bonneville to reconsider the site, and the party abandoned it, leading the place to become known as Bonneville's Folly or Fort Nonsense. Bonneville moved on to the Salmon River in Idaho for the winter. The Green River site functioned as a rendezvous until the party returned east in 1835.

No structure remains at the site, which is marked by an inscribed boulder placed by the Daughters of the American Revolution. The stockade was described as 100-foot (30 m) square palisade of 12-inch (30 cm) cottonwood logs, 15 feet (4.6 m) high with blockhouses on opposite diagonal corners.

The site was placed on the National Register of Historic Places in 1970.

== See also ==
- National Register of Historic Places listings in Sublette County, Wyoming
- Wyoming Historical Landmarks
