= East Fork River =

River in Wyoming, US

Coordinates: 42°45′3.85″N 109°19′14.68″W

The East Fork River is a roughly 45-mile (72 km) tributary of the New Fork River in the U.S. state of Wyoming. It flows southwest from the Wind River Range to a confluence with the New Fork south of Boulder.

Fish commonly found in the river are Brook trout, Brown trout, Mountain whitefish, and Rainbow trout.

The Boulder Fish Rearing Station is situated along the river south of Pinedale. It began operations in 1952. There is also a public access area, East Fork Richie’s-Vible, is 14-mile (23 km) south of Pinedale.
