= Chambers Lodge =

Chambers Lodge may refer to:

- Chambers Lodge, California
- Redick Lodge, in Wyoming
