= New Fork River =

River in Wyoming, United States

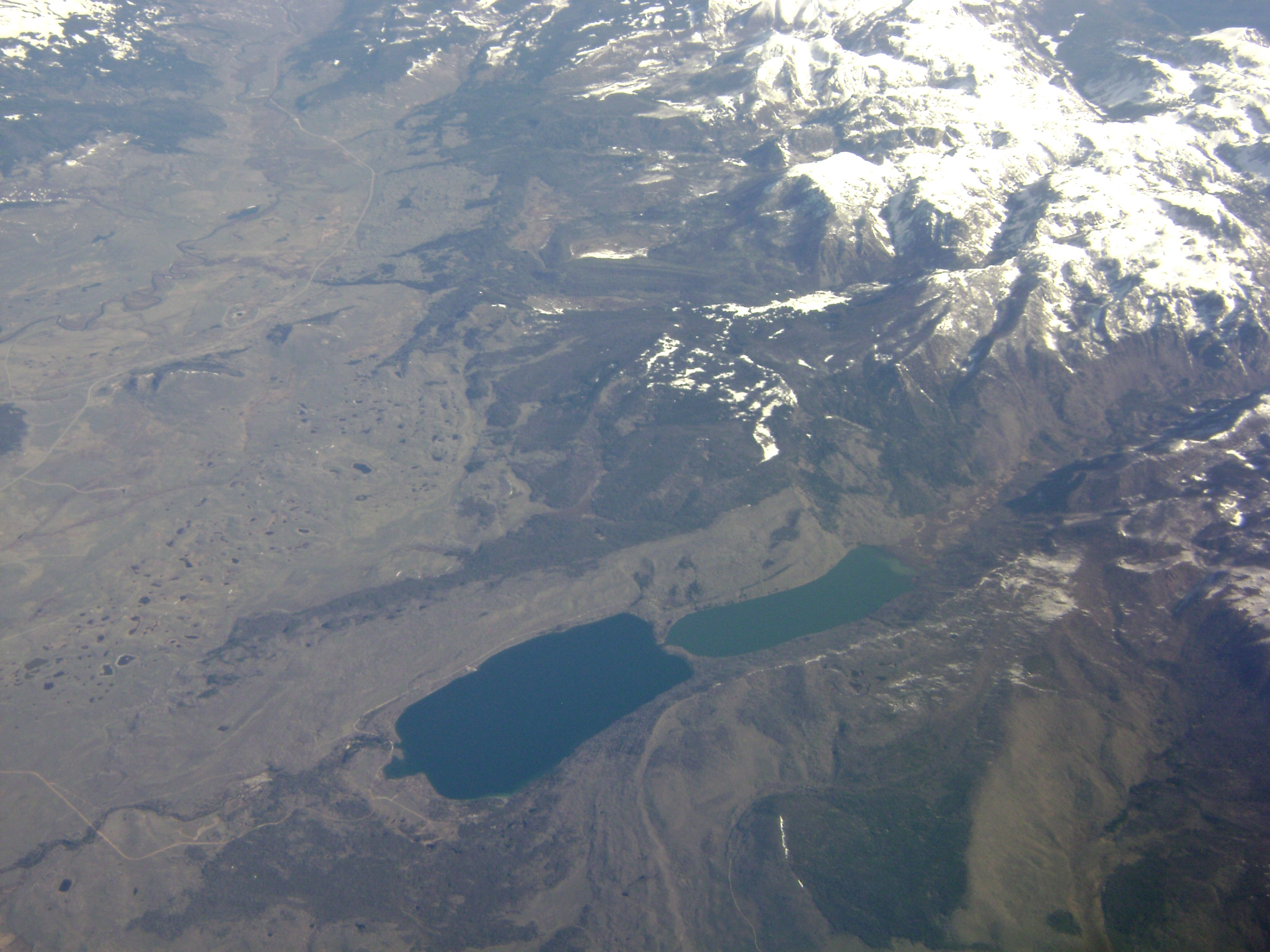
- New Fork River and New Fork Lakes at the base of the Wind River Range

Location
- Country: United States
- State: Wyoming

Physical characteristics
- Source: Wind River Range
  - location: Lozier Lake, Bridger National Forest
  - coordinates: 43°11′03″N 109°48′21″W
  - elevation: 9,850 ft (3,000 m)
- Mouth: Green River
  - location: About 5.5 mi (8.9 km) east of Big Piney
  - coordinates: 42°33′06″N 109°58′15″W
  - elevation: 6,788 ft (2,069 m)
- Length: 70 mi (110 km)
- Basin size: 1,230 mi^{2} (3,200 km^{2})
- Discharge
  - location: near Big Piney
  - average: 712 cu ft/s (20.2 m^{3}/s)
  - minimum: 90 cu ft/s (2.5 m^{3}/s)
  - maximum: 9,190 cu ft/s (260 m^{3}/s)

Basin features
- Tributaries
  - left: Pole Creek, Boulder Creek, East Fork River

The New Fork River is the uppermost major tributary of the Green River in Wyoming, flowing about 70 miles (110 km) entirely within Sublette County. It drains an arid farming region of southwestern Wyoming south of the Wind River Range.

== Course ==
It rises at Lozier Lake in the Wind River Range, nearly 10,000 feet (3,000 m) above sea level, in the Bridger National Forest. Flowing southwest through a steep and narrow glacial canyon, it comes out of the mountains about 10 miles (16 km) north of Cora, briefly widening into the New Fork Lakes. From there it swings south then southeast, past Cora and on to Pinedale, receiving Willow, Pine and Pole Creeks from the left. At Boulder it receives Boulder Creek and turns south again. The East Fork River joins a few miles south of there. From the confluence, the New Fork meanders generally southwest between low bluffs, and joins the Green River about 6 miles (9.7 km) east of Big Piney.

== Recreation ==
The New Fork is considered an excellent river for inner-tube floating and canoeing because of its width and strong but not dangerous current. The river and many of its tributaries also have good fishing especially in the upper reaches. However, most of the river course is isolated and aside from the three small towns along its course (Cora, Pinedale and Boulder) there are few significant settlements of any size nearby.

== See also ==
- List of rivers of Wyoming
