= Daniel School =

- U.S. National Register of Historic Places
- U.S. Historic district
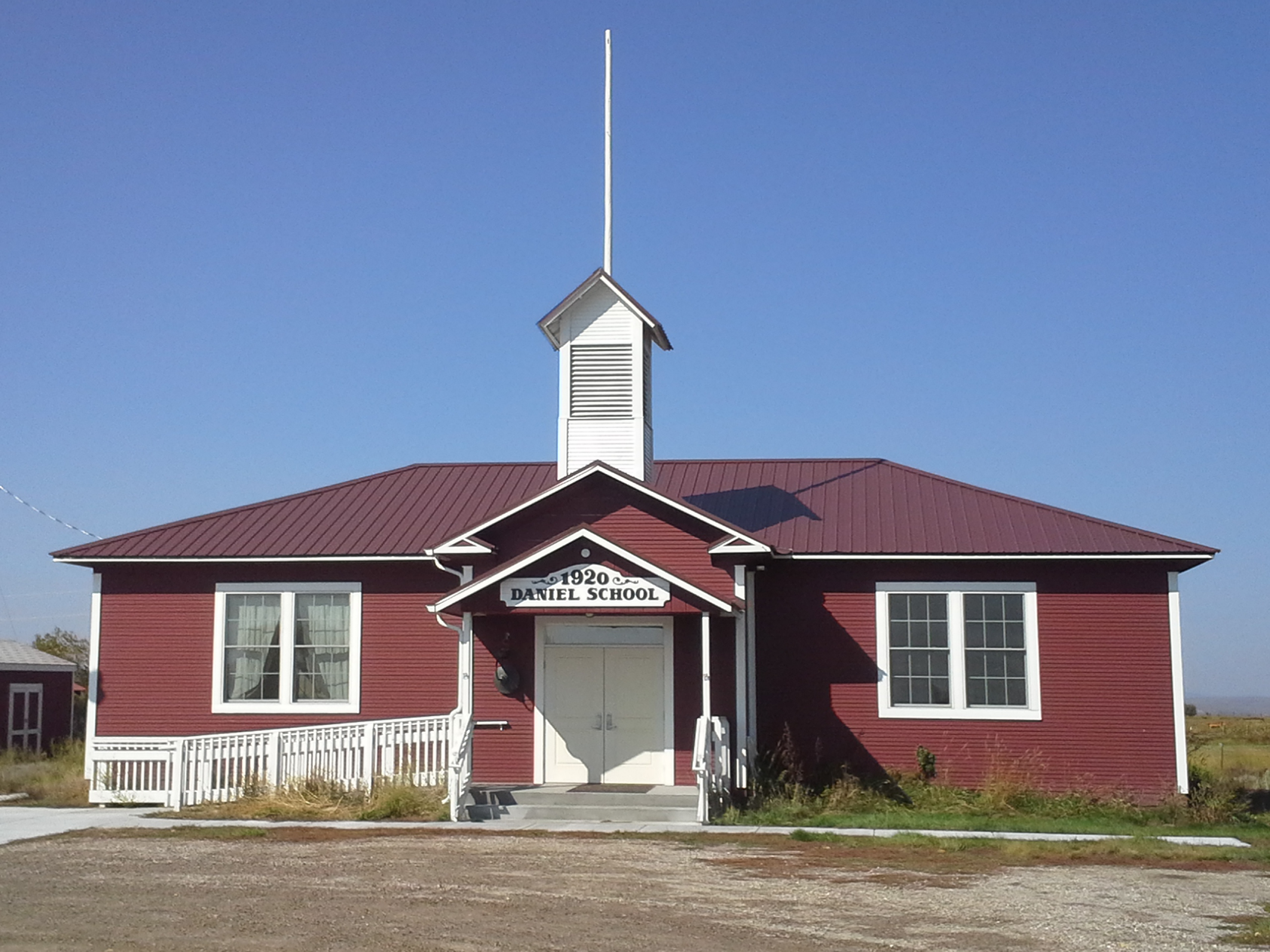

- Location within Wyoming Location within the United States
- Location: US 189, Daniel, Wyoming
- Coordinates: 42°51′53″N 110°4′29″W
- Area: 1.4 acres (0.57 ha)
- Architect: Atwood, A.F.
- NRHP reference No.: 90001387
- Added to NRHP: September 05, 1990

The Daniel School was built in Daniel, Wyoming by contractor A.F. Atwood in 1920. The rural school served Daniel and its surrounding area, replacing improvised school facilities. In 1939, the Daniel district was consolidated, and students were bused to Pinedale for classes. Following consolidation, the Daniel School stood empty until the Daniel Homemaker Club acquired and renovated the building. It is a representative of a typical one-room schoolhouse from the early 20th century, and it has been the object of field trips by classes seeking to experience the historical learning environment.

The school was built to a design from an architectural plan book with a single main room that could be divided by a movable partition. The one story building features a hipped roof and is entered from a closed porch that is topped by a bell tower. The original bell remains in place. The school housed about twenty students. The original privies remain, one each for boys and girls, about 15 feet (4.6 m) from the main building.

The Daniel School was placed on the National Register of Historic Places in 1990.
