= Church of St. Hubert the Hunter and Library =

Historic church in Wyoming, United States

- U.S. National Register of Historic Places
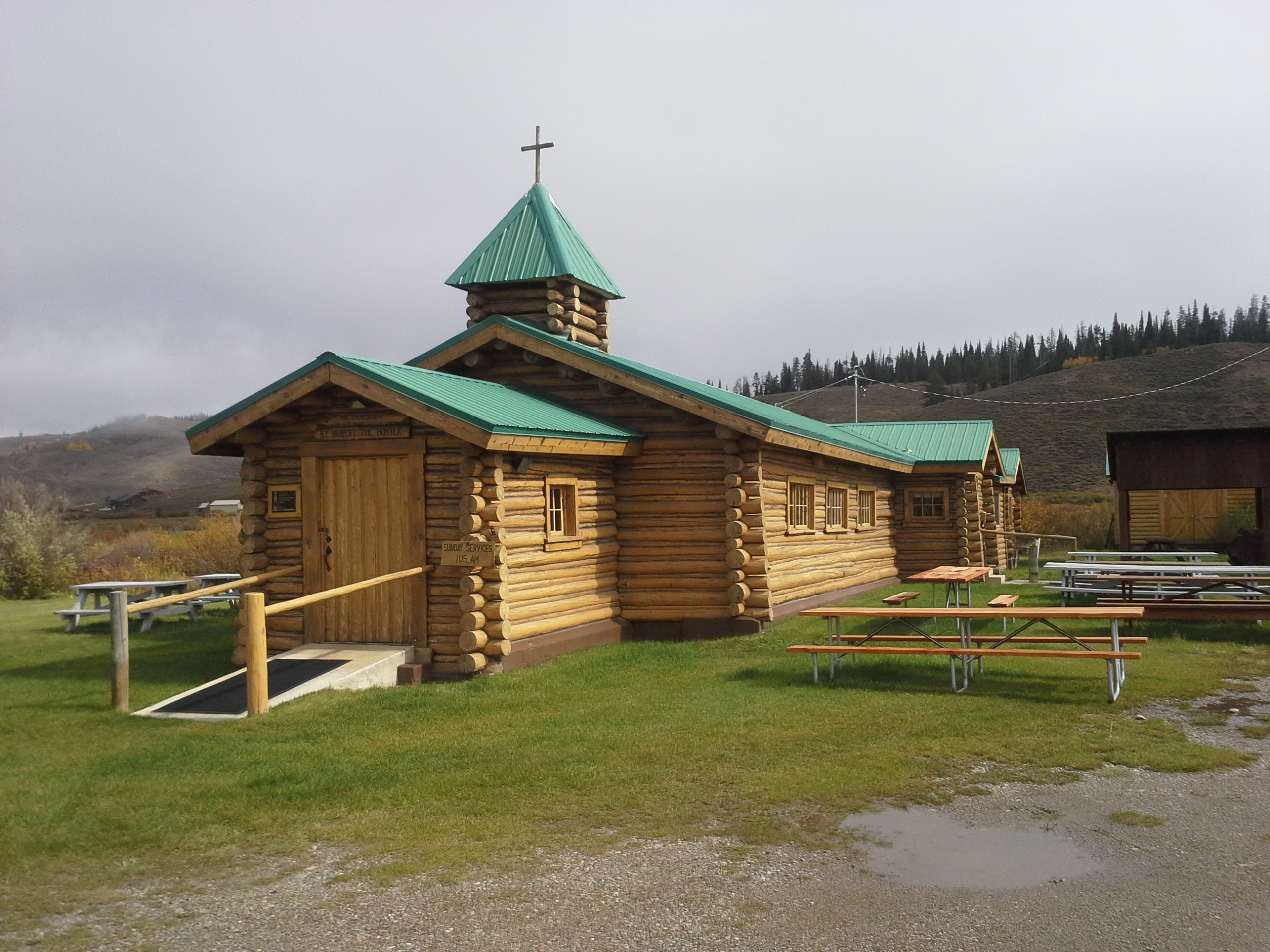

- Location within Wyoming Location within the United States
- Location: Bondurant, Wyoming
- Coordinates: 43°12′5″N 110°24′22″W
- Built: 1940
- Architect: Community of Bondurant
- NRHP reference No.: 01001525
- Added to NRHP: January 24, 2002

The Church of St. Hubert the Hunter and its associated library, also known as the Bondurant Protestant Episcopal Church were built in Bondurant, Wyoming, the church in 1940-41 and the library in 1943. The church was financed by the sale of a diamond bequeathed to the Episcopal Church by Mrs. John Markoe, which was to be sold to finance a memorial church. According to some versions, the church was to be built in the most remote part of the United States. Wyoming Bishop Winfred H. Zeigler suggested Bondurant, where he had been forced to take shelter from a blizzard while traveling in 1937. The diamond was sold for $1400, and Zeigler returned to Bondurant to organize the construction of the church by local volunteers.

The rustic log church and library function as a community center for Bondurant. The church is operated by St. John's Episcopal Church in Jackson.
