= Craig Cabin =

Historic house in Wyoming, United States

- U.S. National Register of Historic Places
- Location within Wyoming Location within the United States
- Nearest city: Bondurant, Wyoming
- Coordinates: 43°14′25.94″N 110°16′13.18″W
- NRHP reference No.: 16000648
- Added to NRHP: September 19, 2016

The Craig Cabin was built as a trapper's cabin near Bondurant, Wyoming between 1898 and 1900. Located in the Gros Ventre Range, the log cabin was occupied by Jack Craig from about 1902, who prospected for gold in the area. Despite claims that Craig had found gold, there was no evidence that he had found any significant amount. Craig advertised his operation on the radio and sold shares in the mine, but it was alleged that he had planted what gold he had on the site. Geological surveys indicated that what gold could be found had come from a higher country via stream drainage. Craig stayed at the cabin during the summer and returned home to Salt Lake City in the winter. Disputes over water made Craig unpopular among local ranchers. From 1940, the cabin was used by Arthur Bowlsby as a lodge for visiting hunters. From 1971, the cabin was used by a succession of outfitting businesses and continues in that use.

The main cabin is a 1 1/2-story log cabin, measuring about 29.5 feet (9.0 m) by 21.5 feet (6.6 m). There are two rooms downstairs with a loft above. A contemporaneous one-story log tack shed is nearby.

The site includes the cabin and mining apparatus used by Craig. A sluice box and water diversion ditches were used in placer mining.

The Craig Cabin was listed in the National Register of Historic Places on September 19, 2016.
