= Upper Green River Rendezvous Site =

- U.S. National Register of Historic Places
- U.S. National Historic Landmark
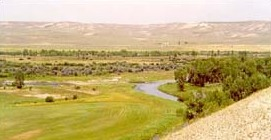
- Overview of the site

- Location within Wyoming Location within the United States
- Location: 42°52′21″N 110°2′20″W
- Nearest city: Daniel, Wyoming
- Area: 1,200 acres (490 ha)
- Built: 1825
- NRHP reference No.: 66000763

Significant dates
- Added to NRHP: October 15, 1966
- Designated NHL: November 5, 1961

The Upper Green River Rendezvous Site is a site on the Green River above and below Daniel, Wyoming, United States. On and near this location, roughly around the confluence of the river with Horse Creek, at least five of the 19th-century Rocky Mountain Rendezvous took place. A 1,200-acre (490 ha) area was declared a National Historic Landmark in 1961.

== Description and history ==
The Upper Green River Rendezvous Site is a largely undeveloped rectangular area, roughly centered on the confluence of the Green River and Horse Creek. The area is located south of United States Route 191 between Daniel and Pinedale, with the only vehicular access provided by a ranch road which crosses the river a short way east of the confluence. The site shows no evidence of the large meetings which took place here in the 19th century.

This area is typical of the sites at which the Rocky Mountain Rendezvous took place between 1825 and 1840. The rendezvous was an organized meeting point for fur trappers, their suppliers, and the buyers of their products to meet. The meetings were first organized by William Henry Ashley, and brought a sense of organization and structure to the otherwise dispersed fur trapping and trading business. Meetings were held annually, generally centered at some location on the Green River. Five were known to be held near the confluence with Horse Creek, but all of them were sprawling affairs, due to the large number of animals needing water and forage.

Although no traces of the rendezvous themselves survive on the site, there is a commemorative marker on a rise overlooking the Horse Creek site, and there are further markers near US 191 at another rendezvous site.

== See also ==
- Eliza Hart Spalding and Narcissa Whitman marker at this site. They were the first white women to cross the Rocky Mountains and the first to attend the Upper Green River Rendezvous
