= Steele Homestead =

- U.S. National Register of Historic Places
- Location within Wyoming Location within the United States
- Nearest city: Boulder, Wyoming
- Coordinates: 42°45′17″N 109°37′14″W
- Area: 47 acres (19 ha)
- Built: 1886
- Built by: Steele, Edward P.
- NRHP reference No.: 85000870
- Added to NRHP: April 25, 1985

The Steele Homestead is a historic homestead located along Wyoming Highway 191 northeast of Boulder, Wyoming. The homestead was established in 1886 by Ed P. Steele, who built a one-room cabin at the site; this cabin was expanded several times until it grew to eight rooms after a 1908 addition. Steele and his family operated and added land to the ranch until it reached a peak of 3,000 acres (1,200 ha); by this point, the Steeles owned 600 cattle and 100 horses. Meanwhile, the ranch continued to add buildings, including a main barn and several sheds; it now has seventeen buildings, fourteen of which are contributing buildings to its National Register listing. Steele's children all stayed in the ranching business, and the homestead is still owned by his descendants.

The homestead was added to the National Register of Historic Places on April 25, 1985.
