= Wyoming Highway 354 =

State highway in Wyoming, United States

Wyoming Highway 354
- Daniel-Merna Road
- WYO 354 highlighted in red

Route information
- Maintained by WYDOT
- Length: 6.17 mi (9.93 km)

Major junctions
- West end: CR 112 northwest of Daniel
- East end: US 189 / US 191 in Daniel Junction

Location
- Country: United States
- State: Wyoming
- Counties: Sublette

Highway system
- Wyoming State Highway System; Interstate; US; State
← WYO 353	→ WYO 370

Wyoming Highway 354 (WYO 354) is a 6.17-mile (9.93 km) east-west state highway in north-central Sublette County, Wyoming, United States, that connects Sublette County Road 112 (Danile Merna Road), northwest of Daniel with U.S. Route 189 / U.S. Route 191 (US 189 / US 191) in Daniel Junction.

== Route description ==
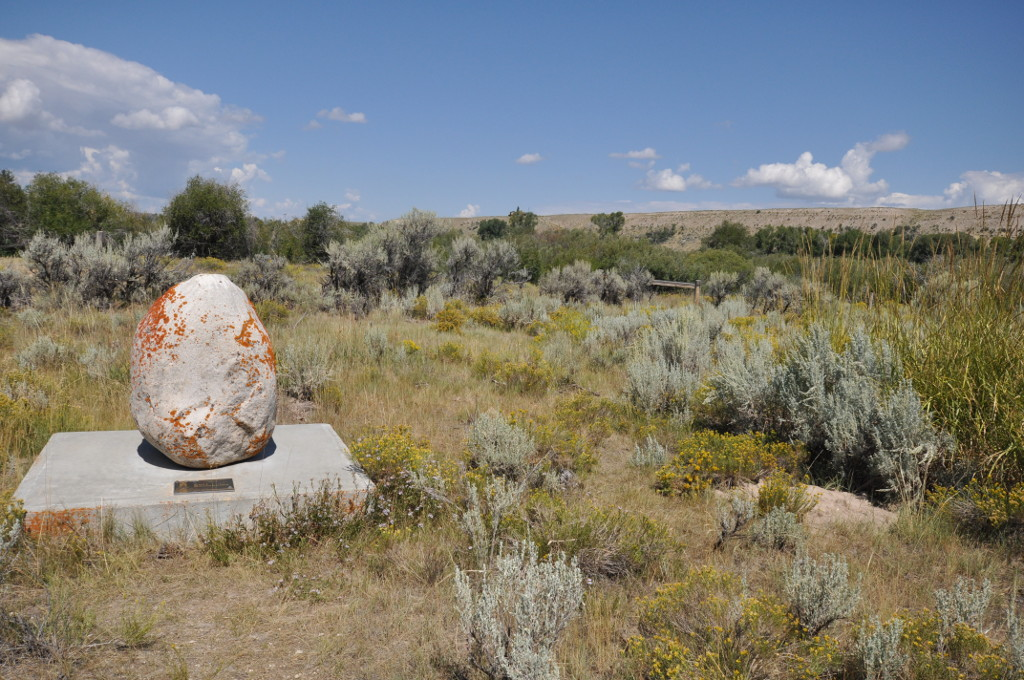
The marker for the former Fort Bonneville, located just off WYO 354, August 2017

WYO 354 begins at Sublette County Road 112 (Daniel-Merna Road) northwest of Daniel. From its western terminus WYO 354 turns southeasterly and follows the southern bank of the Green River. WYO 354 passes by the former site of Fort Bonneville, a fortified winter camp and fur trading post established in 1832, however no structure remains at the site today. Nearing 5 miles, WYO 354 crosses the Green River. At 6.17 miles (9.93 km) WYO 354 reaches its eastern terminus at a T intersection with US 189 / US 191 (roughly 1,500 feet [460 m] west of their southern junction) in Daniel Junction, north of Daniel.

== Major intersections ==
The entire route is in Sublette County.

Location	mi	km	Destinations	Notes
	0.00	0.00	CR 112 west (Daniel-Merna Road)	Western terminus; WYO 354 becomes CR 112
Daniel Junction	6.17	9.93	US 189 north / US 191 north – Jackson, Teton National Park, Yellowstone National Park US 189 south / US 191 south – Daniel, Pinedale, Big Piney, Kemmerer, Rock Springs	Eastern terminus; T intersection
1.000 mi = 1.609 km; 1.000 km = 0.621 mi: Route transition

== See also ==
- List of state highways in Wyoming
