= Father DeSmet's Prairie Mass Site =

- U.S. National Register of Historic Places
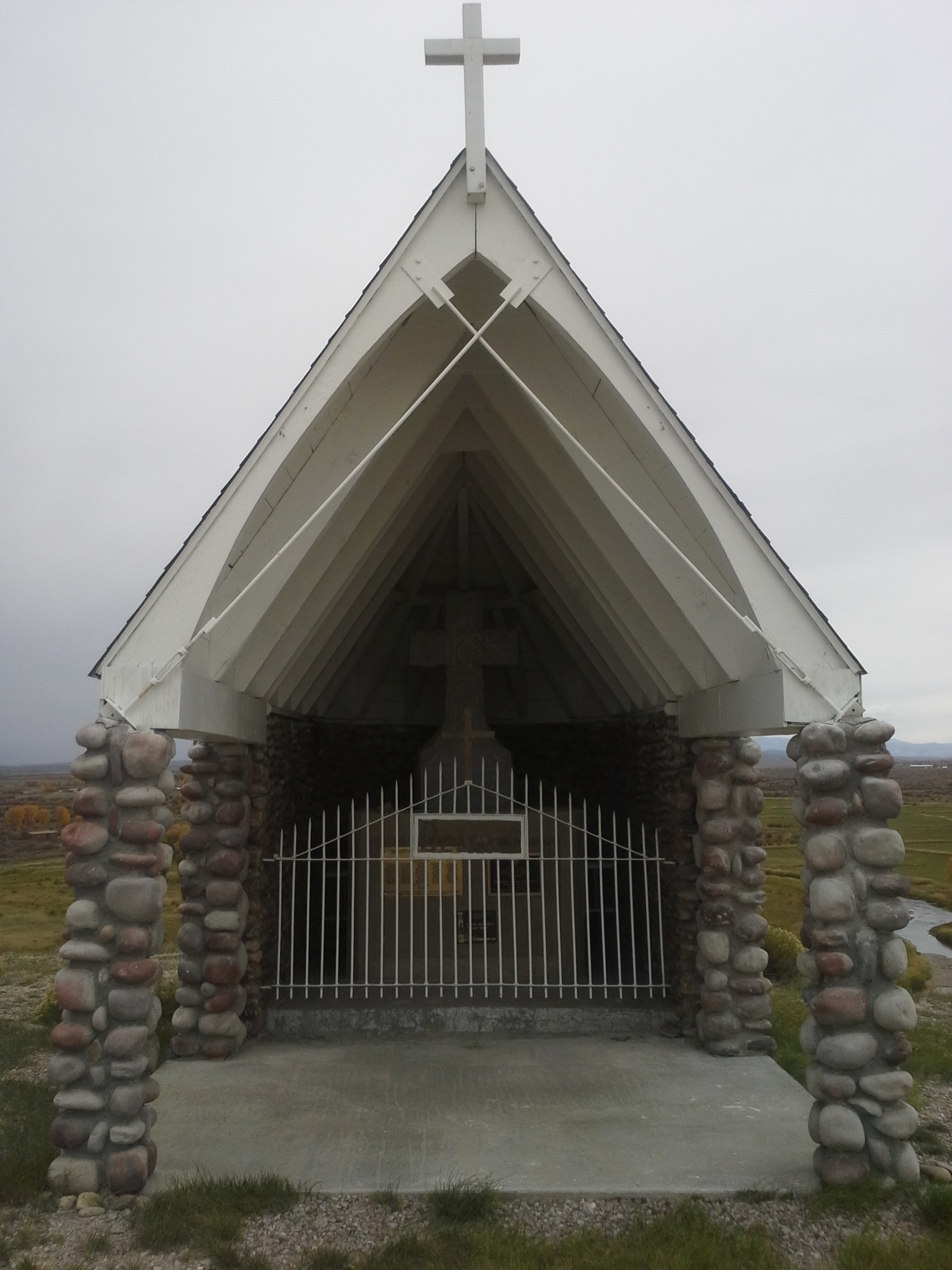

- Location within Wyoming Location within the United States
- Nearest city: Daniel, Wyoming
- Coordinates: 42°52′10″N 110°2′29″W
- Area: less than one acre
- NRHP reference No.: 70000676
- Added to NRHP: April 28, 1970

Father DeSmet's Prairie Mass Site, located about one mile east of Daniel, Wyoming, is the site of the first Catholic mass in Wyoming. The mass was conducted on July 5, 1840, by Jesuit missionary Pierre-Jean De Smet. A congregation of 2,000 people, composed of Native Americans, trappers, and traders from the region, attended the service. A stone altar was constructed for the mass and a granite cross enclosed by a small chapel was later added to the altar site. The service was one of the earliest Christian religious ceremonies conducted in the Rocky Mountain region. The Prairie Mass Site lies approximately at the confluence of the Green River and its tributary Horse Creek. A commemorative mass is celebrated on the 2nd Sunday after the 4th in July every year at 10:00 AM MST. Mass is facilitated by the parish Our Lady of Peace located in Pinedale, WY.

The site was added to the National Register of Historic Places on April 28, 1970.
