= New Fork, Wyoming =

- New Fork
- U.S. National Register of Historic Places
- U.S. Historic district
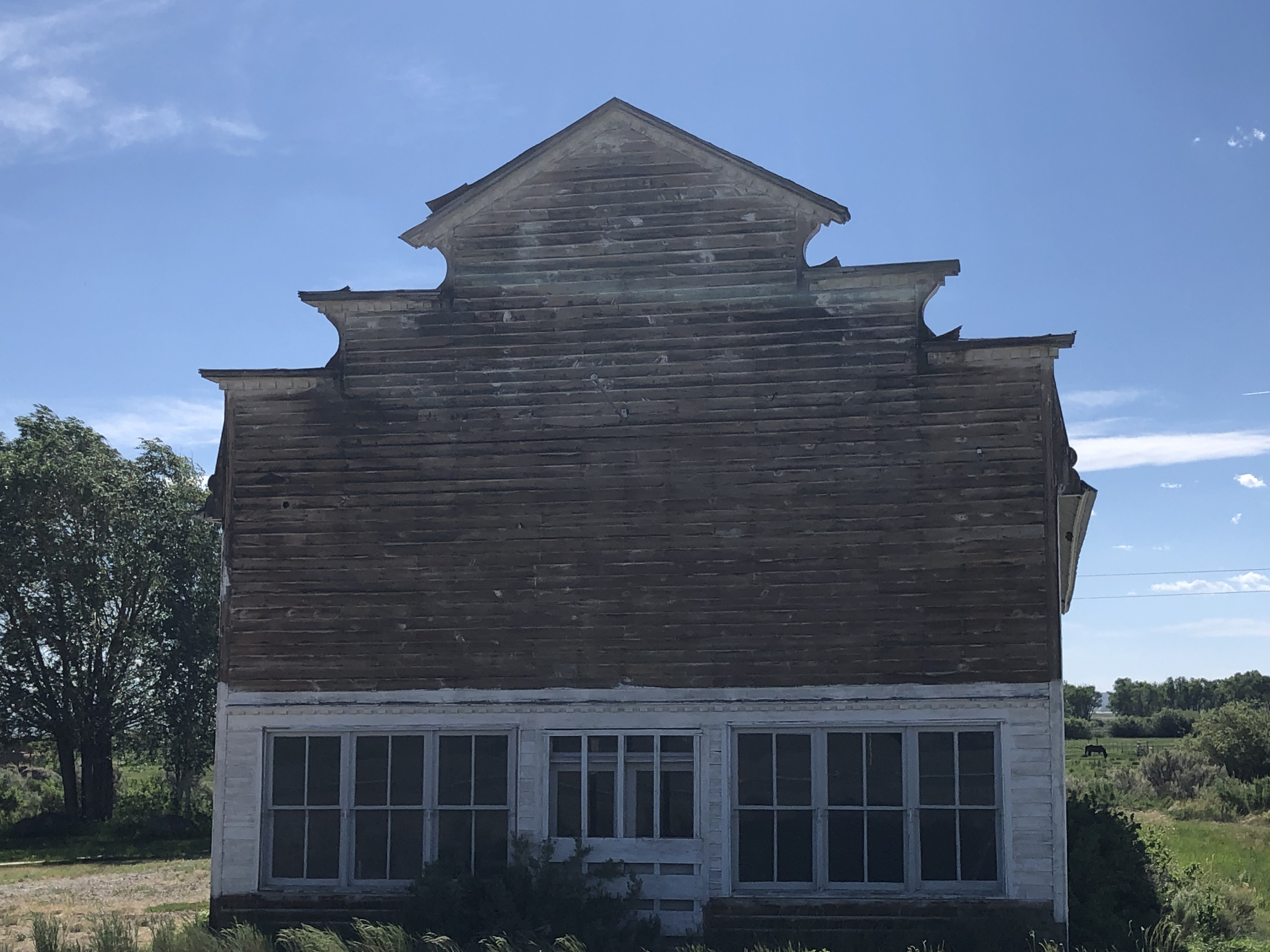
- Abandon building in New Fork, Wyoming

- Location within Wyoming Location within the United States
- Location: Sublette County, Wyoming
- Nearest city: Boulder, Wyoming
- Coordinates: 42°42′13″N 109°42′55″W
- Architect: Chris Brandt, John Vible
- NRHP reference No.: 87000773
- Added to NRHP: July 16, 1987

New Fork is a ghost town in Sublette County, Wyoming, United States, near Boulder. It was one of the earliest settlements in the upper Green River valley. New Fork was established in 1888 by John Vible and Louis Broderson, Danish immigrants who had arrived in the United States in 1884. They established a store along the Lander cut-off of the Oregon Trail. By 1908 a small town had grown around the store, and in 1910 Vible built a dance hall, called The Valhalla.

In the early years of the settlement, the local Bannock and Shoshoni Indians from the Wind River Indian Reservation accounted for much of the town's trade. Vible and Broderson's original store was a log cabin, selling supplies obtained in Evanston.

The death of Vible and members of his family from diphtheria and scarlet fever in 1915 started a decline, exacerbated by the abandonment of the Lander cut-off. Mail service stopped in 1918.

Several log and frame buildings remain in the townsite.
