= Sommers Ranch Headquarters Historic District =

Historic district in Wyoming, United States

- U.S. National Register of Historic Places
- U.S. Historic district
- Location within Wyoming Location within the United States
- Location: Sublette County, at 734 Co. Rd. 23-110, Pinedale, Wyoming
- Coordinates: 42°46′45″N 109°57′46″W
- Built: Albert P. Sommers
- NRHP reference No.: 09000454
- Added to NRHP: June 18, 2009

The Sommers Ranch Headquarters Historic District is a historic ranch complex located southwest of Pinedale, Wyoming. The district includes 11 wooden buildings, including a homestead house, a bunkhouse, a barn, and various other farm buildings and outbuildings. Albert P. "Prof" Sommers founded the ranch in 1908. Sommers married May McAlister in 1911; after the couple bought land from May's parents and her friend Nellie Yates, their ranch grew to 1,900 acres (770 ha). The ranch is still operational and serves as an example of the many ranches built in the upper Green River Valley.

The district was listed on the U.S. National Register of Historic Places on June 18, 2009. The listing was announced as the featured listing in the National Park Service's weekly list of June 26, 2009.
