= St. John's Episcopal Church and Rectory (Jackson, Wyoming) =

Historic church in Wyoming, United States

- U.S. National Register of Historic Places
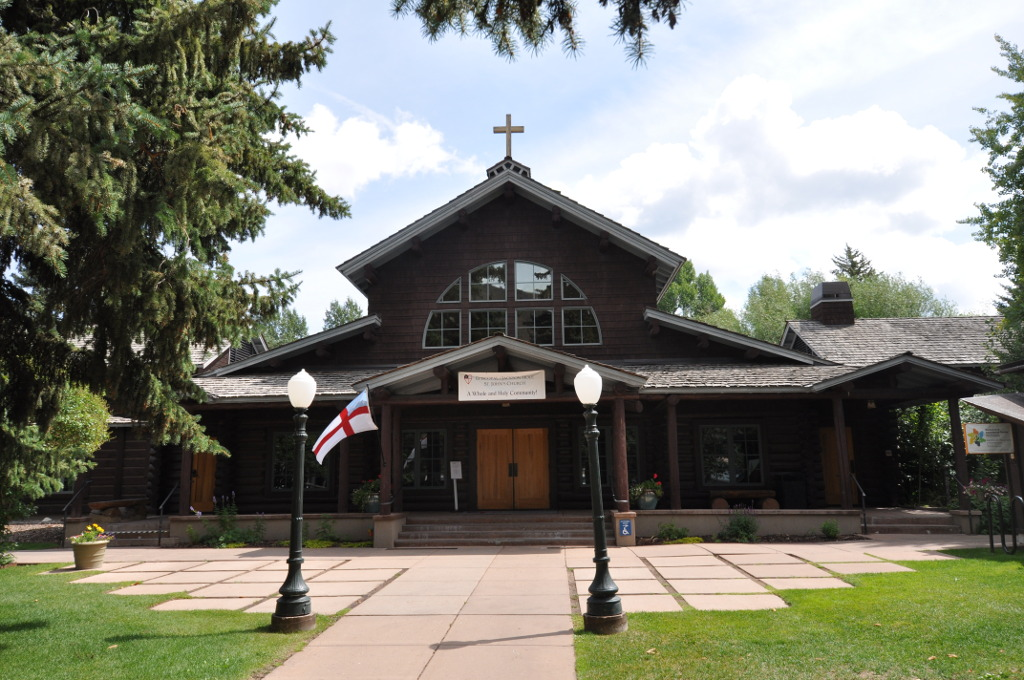

- Location within Wyoming Location within the United States
- Location: 132 N. Glenwood St., Jackson, Wyoming
- Coordinates: 43°28′54″N 110°45′50″W
- Built: 1911
- Architect: Butch & Ed Robinson
- NRHP reference No.: 78002834
- Added to NRHP: December 1, 1978

St. John's Episcopal Church and Rectory form a complex of log structures in Jackson, Wyoming. The rectory was built first: in 1911 it was a hostel and community center under the supervision of Episcopal Bishop Nathaniel Thomas. Church services were held there until 1916, when the church was built. The church and hostel are among the largest log structures in Jackson Hole.

The rectory was the first location in Jackson to hold regular Episcopal services, beginning in 1911. Services had been held intermittently since 1908. With the construction of the new church in 1916 the rectory was used as a hostel so that ranchers and lodgers at dude ranches more than a day's travel distant could stay overnight. The rectory was also used as a meeting place and social hall, and eventually as a community library with over 1000 volumes. The rectory is a 1-1/2 story building, featuring carefully built log dormers.

The 1916 church was built by Butch and Ed Robinson of Jackson, using logs cut and cured by George and Clarence Blain, with finish work by master carpenter Raul A. Imeson. The church and rectory were designed using the locally prevailing rustic style that was becoming popular for dude ranches and park structures. The church measures approximately 60 feet (18 m) by 24 feet (7.3 m), covered with an open log-trussed roof. This building is now referred to as a chapel, since a new, larger church was built in 1995.

The site also includes a 1950s rectory and a frame parish hall, both considered non-contributing structures.

St. John's Church operates the Chapel of the Transfiguration in Grand Teton National Park. The church was instrumental in organizing the hospital in Jackson, now named St. John's Medical Center.
