= Trappers Point Site =

- U.S. National Register of Historic Places
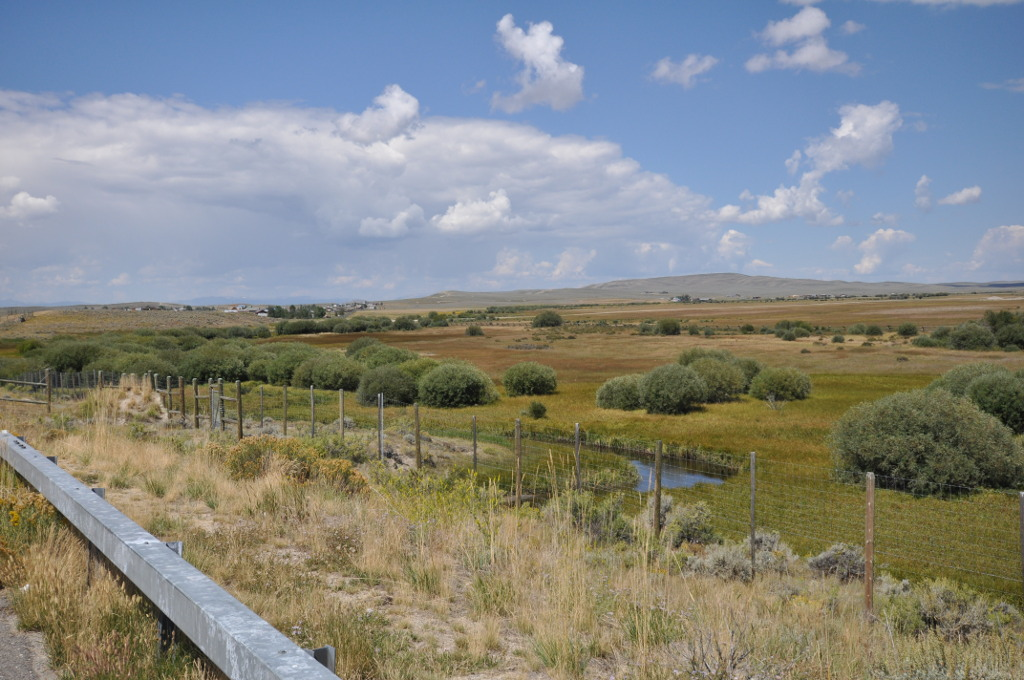

- Location within Wyoming Location within the United States
- Nearest city: Pinedale, Wyoming
- Coordinates: 42°52′34″N 109°56′45″W
- Area: 11 acres (4.5 ha)
- NRHP reference No.: 07000368
- Added to NRHP: May 14, 2007

The Trappers Point Site is an archaeological site located near Pinedale, Wyoming. The site, which dates to the Early Archaic period, is the oldest known location used for the mass culling of pronghorn antelope. In addition, a large number of projectile points have been found at the site; the variety of projectile point designs at the site have helped establish how these tools developed, and the presence of points from many parts of the Green River valley have aided in determining prehistoric migration patterns. The site has been called "a major discovery in Wyoming archaeology" and "one of the key sites in Wyoming".

The site was added to the National Register of Historic Places on May 14, 2007. A pulloff on United States Route 191 west of Pinedale overlooks the site, with interpretive panels.
