= Bondurant, Wyoming =

- CDP
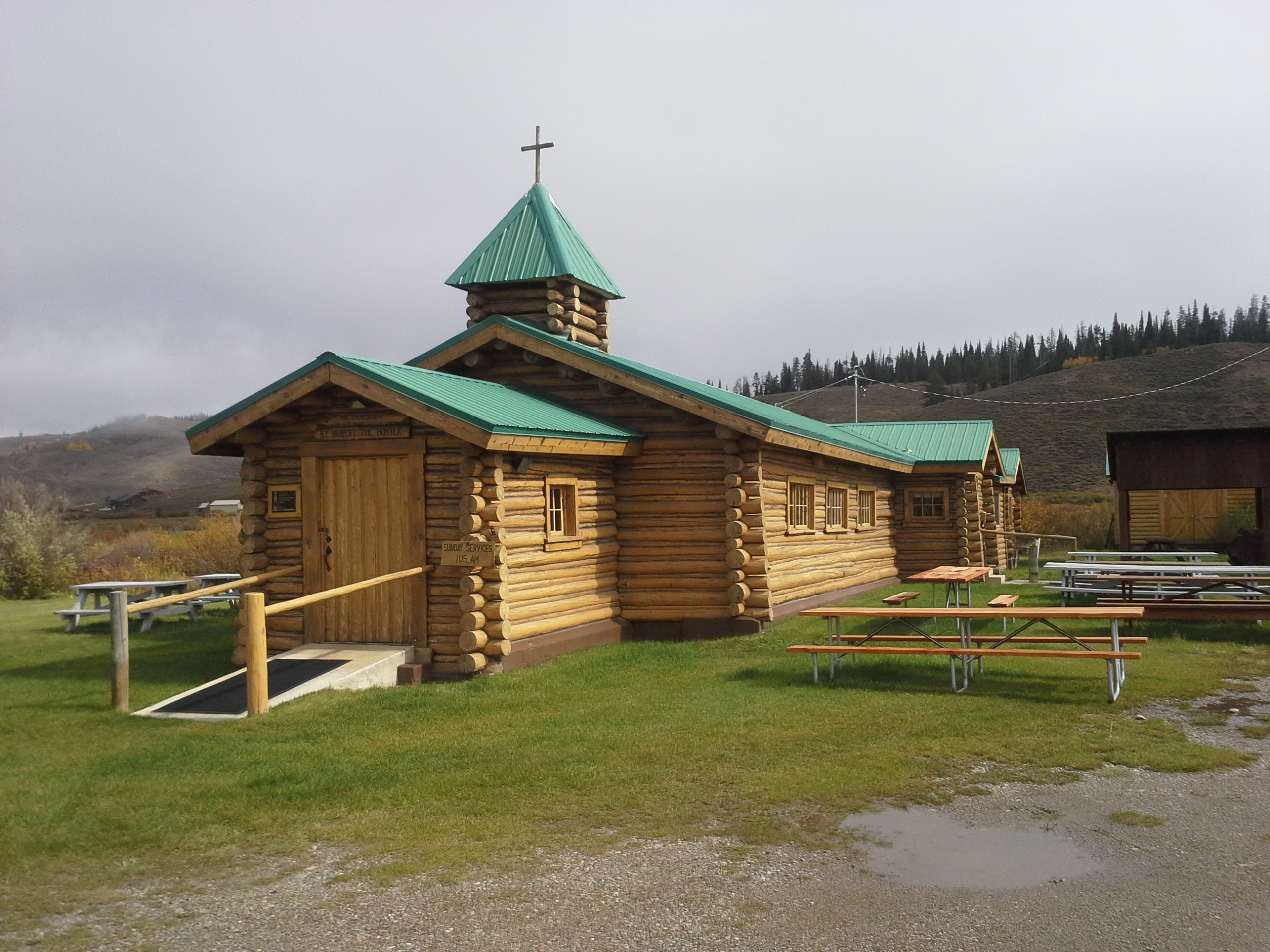
- Church of St. Hubert the Hunter and Library

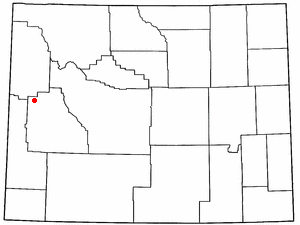
- Location of Bondurant, Wyoming
- Coordinates: 43°11′34″N 110°24′11″W
- Country: United States
- State: Wyoming
- County: Sublette

Area
  - Total: 52.8 sq mi (137 km^{2})
  - Land: 52.8 sq mi (137 km^{2})
  - Water: 0.0 sq mi (0 km^{2})
- Elevation: 6,611 ft (2,015 m)

Population (2010)
  - Total: 93
  - Density: 1.8/sq mi (0.68/km^{2})
- Time zone: UTC−7 (Mountain (MST))
  - Summer (DST): UTC−6 (MDT)
- ZIP code: 82922
- Area code: 307
- FIPS code: 56-08365
- GNIS feature ID: 2407880

Bondurant is a census-designated place (CDP) in Sublette County, Wyoming, United States. The population was 93 at the 2010 census. The town was named after B. F. Bondurant.

== Demographics ==
As of the census of 2000, there were 155 people, 75 households, and 45 families residing in the CDP. The population density was 2.0 people per square mile (0.8/km^{2}). There were 128 housing units at an average density of 1.6/sq mi (0.6/km^{2}). The racial makeup of the CDP was 98.06% White, 1.94% from other races. Hispanic or Latino of any race were 4.52% of the population.

There were 75 households, out of which 18.7% had children under the age of 18 living with them, 54.7% were married couples living together, and 38.7% were non-families. 32.0% of all households were made up of individuals, and 10.7% had someone living alone who was 65 years of age or older. The average household size was 2.07 and the average family size was 2.54.

In the CDP, the population was spread out, with 14.8% under the age of 18, 7.7% from 18 to 24, 28.4% from 25 to 44, 31.6% from 45 to 64, and 17.4% who were 65 years of age or older. The median age was 44 years. For every 100 females, there were 121.4 males. For every 100 females age 18 and over, there were 112.9 males.

The median income for a household in the CDP was $39,063, and the median income for a family was $41,250. Males had a median income of $26,563 versus $23,636 for females. The per capita income for the CDP was $19,432. About 9.5% of families and 19.2% of the population were below the poverty line, including 21.7% of those under the age of eighteen and 19.0% of those 65 or over.

Bondurant in 2026

== Geography ==
Bondurant is located in the Hoback Basin.

According to the United States Census Bureau, the CDP has a total area of 52.8 square miles (136.7 km^{2}), all land.

=== Climate ===
Due to its high elevation, Bondurant experiences a subarctic climate (Köppen Dfc). The hottest temperature recorded in Bondurant was 95 °F (35 °C) on July 14, 2002, while the coldest temperature recorded was −57 °F (−49 °C) on February 1, 1951.

Climate data for Bondurant, Wyoming, 1991–2020 normals, extremes 1948–present
Month	Jan	Feb	Mar	Apr	May	Jun	Jul	Aug	Sep	Oct	Nov	Dec	Year
Record high °F (°C)	47 (8)	54 (12)	70 (21)	77 (25)	85 (29)	90 (32)	96 (36)	94 (34)	93 (34)	80 (27)	66 (19)	56 (13)	96 (36)
Mean maximum °F (°C)	38.3 (3.5)	41.9 (5.5)	50.7 (10.4)	64.7 (18.2)	75.6 (24.2)	83.1 (28.4)	87.9 (31.1)	87.3 (30.7)	82.2 (27.9)	72.6 (22.6)	55.4 (13.0)	39.9 (4.4)	88.6 (31.4)
Mean daily maximum °F (°C)	24.5 (−4.2)	29.2 (−1.6)	39.2 (4.0)	49.8 (9.9)	62.2 (16.8)	71.5 (21.9)	80.4 (26.9)	79.7 (26.5)	70.6 (21.4)	55.6 (13.1)	39.1 (3.9)	24.3 (−4.3)	52.2 (11.2)
Daily mean °F (°C)	13.4 (−10.3)	16.1 (−8.8)	26.3 (−3.2)	37.8 (3.2)	47.6 (8.7)	54.8 (12.7)	60.9 (16.1)	59.6 (15.3)	51.7 (10.9)	40.3 (4.6)	27.4 (−2.6)	13.9 (−10.1)	37.5 (3.0)
Mean daily minimum °F (°C)	2.3 (−16.5)	3.0 (−16.1)	13.4 (−10.3)	25.8 (−3.4)	33.0 (0.6)	38.2 (3.4)	41.4 (5.2)	39.5 (4.2)	32.7 (0.4)	24.9 (−3.9)	15.7 (−9.1)	3.4 (−15.9)	22.8 (−5.1)
Mean minimum °F (°C)	−28.7 (−33.7)	−26.8 (−32.7)	−16.8 (−27.1)	5.0 (−15.0)	16.6 (−8.6)	22.7 (−5.2)	27.3 (−2.6)	23.4 (−4.8)	15.0 (−9.4)	4.4 (−15.3)	−12.4 (−24.7)	−26.5 (−32.5)	−34.6 (−37.0)
Record low °F (°C)	−56 (−49)	−57 (−49)	−39 (−39)	−23 (−31)	7 (−14)	13 (−11)	18 (−8)	12 (−11)	3 (−16)	−16 (−27)	−39 (−39)	−51 (−46)	−57 (−49)
Average precipitation inches (mm)	2.19 (56)	1.93 (49)	1.58 (40)	1.35 (34)	1.88 (48)	1.79 (45)	0.90 (23)	1.23 (31)	1.44 (37)	1.46 (37)	1.84 (47)	2.52 (64)	20.11 (511)
Average snowfall inches (cm)	32.1 (82)	27.2 (69)	18.0 (46)	8.1 (21)	1.5 (3.8)	0.4 (1.0)	0.0 (0.0)	0.0 (0.0)	0.2 (0.51)	4.5 (11)	15.6 (40)	33.5 (85)	141.1 (359.31)
Average precipitation days (≥ 0.01 in)	11.8	10.5	10.7	9.3	11.0	10.1	7.3	7.6	7.8	8.0	8.8	12.5	115.4
Average snowy days (≥ 0.1 in)	12.1	10.4	9.4	5.0	1.1	0.3	0.0	0.0	0.3	2.6	6.7	12.7	60.6
Source 1: NOAA
Source 2: National Weather Service

== Education ==
Public education in the community of Bondurant is provided by Sublette County School District #1. Schools serving the community include Bondurant Elementary School (grades K-4), Pinedale Middle School (grades 5–8), and Pinedale High School (grades 9–12).

== See also ==
- Church of St. Hubert the Hunter and Library, a pair of historic buildings located in the town
