= Redick Lodge =

Historic house in Wyoming, United States

- Redick - Chambers Lodge
- U.S. National Register of Historic Places
- U.S. Historic district
- Location within Wyoming Location within the United States
- Nearest city: Pinedale, Wyoming
- Coordinates: 42°59′34″N 109°48′8″W
- Built: 1918
- Architect: Otis Miller
- NRHP reference No.: 83003364
- Added to NRHP: March 18, 1983

The Redick Lodge, also known as the Chambers Lodge, is a private seasonal retreat on Fremont Lake near Pinedale, Wyoming, United States, in the Wind River Range at an elevation of 7,500 feet (2,300 m). The lodge was designed by architect Otis Miller of Miles City, Montana as a log cabin on a stone foundation for George M. Redick, a Nebraskan who had worked with the Union Pacific Railroad on potential locations for company hotels. The Redick family spent summers at the lodge from 1918 through 1931, when family fortunes declined. The property was purchased by Dr. Oliver Chambers of Rock Springs, Wyoming in 1938 and has remained in the Chambers family.

== History ==
George Redick had been taken with the site on Fremont Lake after assessing it in 1916 for its suitability for development by the Union Pacific with a destination hotel. While the hotel idea was rejected as prohibitively expensive, Redick returned with his family the next summer and camped for two months. Choosing a site on the northwest shore they contracted with the U.S. Forest Service for a lease and hired architect Otis Miller of Miles City, Montana to design a lodge. Construction began the next year, supervised by Miller, who stayed at the site that summer and the next. A sawmill was set up to process the timber, which was all standing dead wood found near the site. A shop was built first to house machinery for construction. The main lodge was built between 1920 and 1924. The other outbuildings were also built during this time.

Once the lodge was completed, the Redicks spent their summers there, entertaining visitors from Omaha, their hometown. Other visitors included King Gustav V of Sweden. The Redick family's fortunes declined during the Great Depression, and they spent their last summer at the lodge in 1931. George Redick died in 1936.

In 1938 the lodge was purchased by Dr. Oliver Chambers, who held the only other lease on Fremont Lake. Chambers bought the Redick lodge to protect it and as an investment, but in 1940 Chambers' lodge burned in an accidental fire, and the Chambers family elected to move to the Redick lodge.

== Description ==
The lodge and its matching outbuildings are examples of rustic architecture, also known as Western Craftsman style. The lodge's furnishings were mostly built on site in the same style as the house. The house's interior is dominated by a living room in the main block, with four small sleeping rooms directly off the main room. A hall leads to a kitchen in the main unit, then to a dining room located in the rear wing. The living room features exposed log trusses supporting the roof and a two-sided rubblestone fireplace designed by Omaha architect George. B. Prinze. The overscale fireplace faces into the living room and onto the porch just outside the living room.

The site includes a number of outbuildings, including a machine shop-storage shed, pumphouse, root cellar, three guest cabins, a barn and two privies. All are built of materials built on site. As of its nomination, the lodge did not have electricity, but did have hot and cold running water, and was essentially unchanged since the 1920s.

The Redick Lodge was listed in the National Register of Historic Places in 1983.
