= Boulder, Wyoming =

- CDP
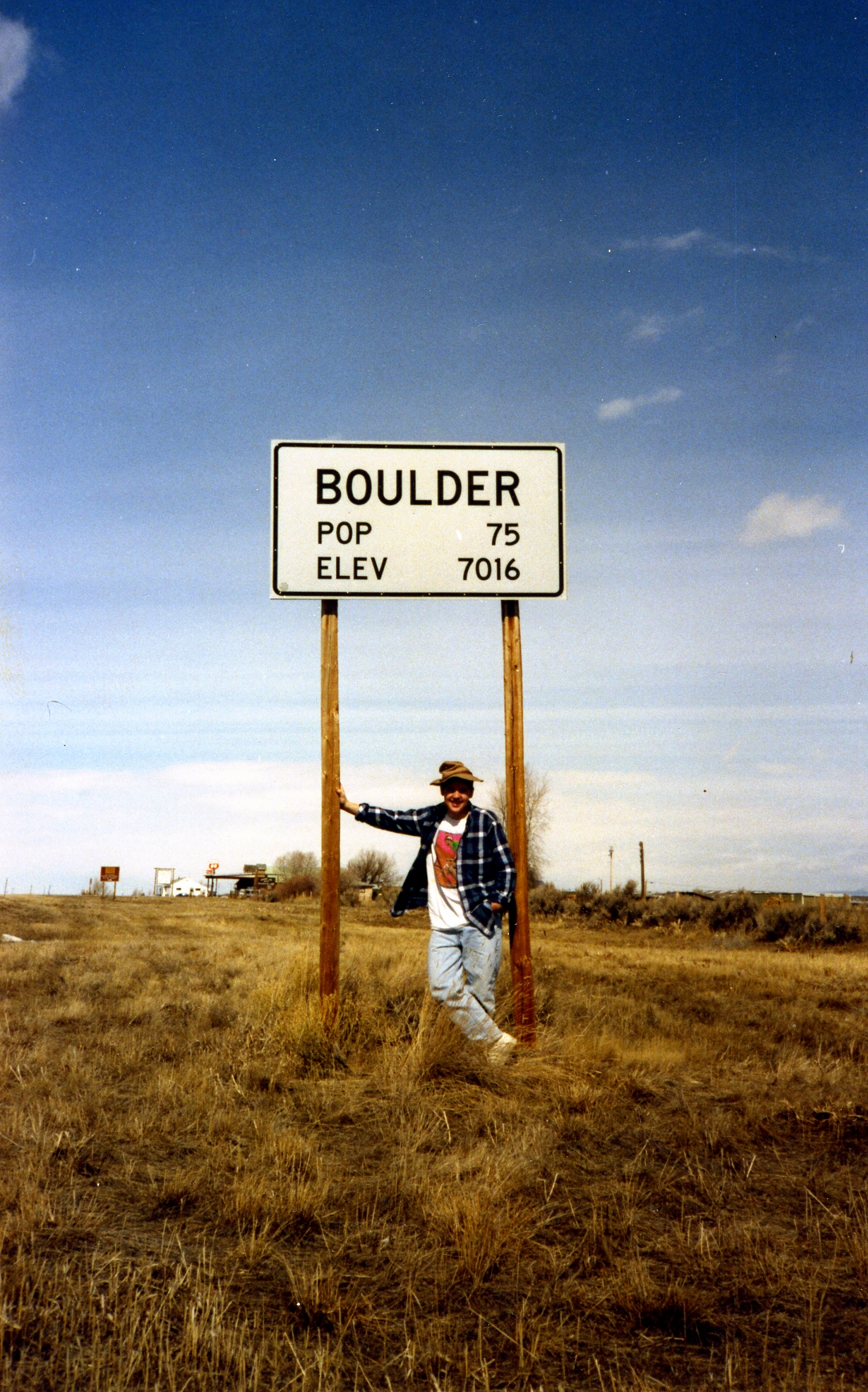
- Sign at the edge of the community

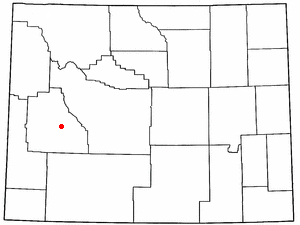
- Location of Boulder, Wyoming
- Coordinates: 42°45′02″N 109°42′36″W
- Country: United States
- State: Wyoming
- County: Sublette

Area
  - Total: 1.9 sq mi (4.9 km^{2})
  - Land: 1.9 sq mi (4.9 km^{2})
  - Water: 0.0 sq mi (0 km^{2})
- Elevation: 7,018 ft (2,139 m)

Population (2010)
  - Total: 170
  - Density: 89/sq mi (35/km^{2})
- Time zone: UTC-7 (Mountain (MST))
  - Summer (DST): UTC-6 (MDT)
- ZIP code: 82923
- Area code: 307
- FIPS code: 56-09235
- GNIS feature ID: 2407891

Boulder is a census-designated place (CDP) in Sublette County, Wyoming, United States. The population was 170 at the 2010 census.

== Geography ==
According to the United States Census Bureau, the CDP has a total area of 1.9 square miles (4.8 km^{2}), all land.

== Demographics ==
As at the census of 2000, there were 30 people, 15 households, and 7 families residing in the CDP. The population density was 23.1 people per square mile (8.9/km^{2}). There were 28 housing units at an average density of 21.5/sq mi (8.3/km^{2}). The racial makeup of the CDP was 100.00% White.

There were 15 households, out of which 13.3% had children under the age of 18 living with them, 40.0% were married couples living together, 6.7% had a female householder with no husband present, and 53.3% were non-families. 46.7% of all households were made up of individuals, and 13.3% had someone living alone who was 65 years of age or older. The average household size was 2.00 and the average family size was 2.71.

In the CDP, the population was spread out, with 10.0% under the age of 18, 6.7% from 18 to 24, 30.0% from 25 to 44, 36.7% from 45 to 64, and 16.7% who were 65 years of age or older. The median age was 46 years. For every 100 females there were 130.8 males. For every 100 females age 18 and over, there were 145.5 males.

The median income for a household in the CDP was $12,500, and the median income for a family was $23,750. Males had a median income of $0 versus $0 for females. The per capita income for the CDP was $7,908. There were no families and 33.3% of the population living below the poverty line, including no under eighteens and none of those over 64.

== Air pollution ==
Since January 2008, ground-level ozone in Boulder and the surrounding area has exceeded healthy levels 11 times. Natural gas drilling in nearby Jonah Field and the Pinedale Anticline is blamed for the reduced air quality.

== Education ==
Public education in the community of Boulder is provided by Sublette County School District #1.

== Climate ==
Boulder experiences a Continental climate (Köppen Dfb) with long, cold, dry winters and short, warm summers.

Climate data for Boulder, Wyoming, 1991–2020 normals, extremes 1989–present
Month	Jan	Feb	Mar	Apr	May	Jun	Jul	Aug	Sep	Oct	Nov	Dec	Year
Record high °F (°C)	49 (9)	53 (12)	75 (24)	77 (25)	78 (26)	94 (34)	97 (36)	93 (34)	91 (33)	81 (27)	67 (19)	56 (13)	97 (36)
Mean maximum °F (°C)	39.7 (4.3)	42.7 (5.9)	55.5 (13.1)	69.5 (20.8)	77.2 (25.1)	84.4 (29.1)	88.9 (31.6)	87.6 (30.9)	83.0 (28.3)	73.5 (23.1)	58.3 (14.6)	44.0 (6.7)	89.6 (32.0)
Mean daily maximum °F (°C)	27.2 (−2.7)	30.8 (−0.7)	41.7 (5.4)	53.1 (11.7)	62.8 (17.1)	72.9 (22.7)	81.5 (27.5)	80.5 (26.9)	71.2 (21.8)	57.9 (14.4)	41.5 (5.3)	29.2 (−1.6)	54.2 (12.3)
Daily mean °F (°C)	9.9 (−12.3)	13.1 (−10.5)	25.5 (−3.6)	36.5 (2.5)	45.6 (7.6)	54.3 (12.4)	61.1 (16.2)	59.5 (15.3)	50.8 (10.4)	38.8 (3.8)	24.7 (−4.1)	12.5 (−10.8)	36.0 (2.2)
Mean daily minimum °F (°C)	−7.4 (−21.9)	−4.6 (−20.3)	9.3 (−12.6)	19.9 (−6.7)	28.4 (−2.0)	35.7 (2.1)	40.8 (4.9)	38.6 (3.7)	30.3 (−0.9)	19.7 (−6.8)	7.9 (−13.4)	−4.1 (−20.1)	17.9 (−7.8)
Mean minimum °F (°C)	−27.1 (−32.8)	−24.2 (−31.2)	−11.5 (−24.2)	8.1 (−13.3)	16.6 (−8.6)	26.1 (−3.3)	33.1 (0.6)	29.1 (−1.6)	20.5 (−6.4)	6.0 (−14.4)	−11.2 (−24.0)	−22.7 (−30.4)	−31.3 (−35.2)
Record low °F (°C)	−44 (−42)	−38 (−39)	−29 (−34)	−8 (−22)	9 (−13)	18 (−8)	25 (−4)	23 (−5)	12 (−11)	−17 (−27)	−27 (−33)	−52 (−47)	−52 (−47)
Average precipitation inches (mm)	0.48 (12)	0.51 (13)	0.53 (13)	0.88 (22)	1.44 (37)	1.26 (32)	0.71 (18)	0.73 (19)	1.00 (25)	0.88 (22)	0.45 (11)	0.46 (12)	9.33 (236)
Average snowfall inches (cm)	6.8 (17)	7.3 (19)	5.3 (13)	4.9 (12)	1.9 (4.8)	0.2 (0.51)	0.0 (0.0)	0.0 (0.0)	0.3 (0.76)	3.6 (9.1)	4.9 (12)	6.9 (18)	42.1 (106.17)
Average extreme snow depth inches (cm)	8.6 (22)	10.7 (27)	9.7 (25)	3.1 (7.9)	0.9 (2.3)	0.1 (0.25)	0.0 (0.0)	0.0 (0.0)	0.1 (0.25)	2.3 (5.8)	3.1 (7.9)	6.0 (15)	11.7 (30)
Average precipitation days (≥ 0.01 in)	6.3	6.0	5.4	6.8	8.8	6.9	5.3	5.7	6.7	5.2	5.2	6.6	74.9
Average snowy days (≥ 0.1 in)	4.9	5.0	3.8	2.9	0.9	0.2	0.0	0.0	0.2	1.6	3.8	5.3	28.6
Source 1: NOAA
Source 2: National Weather Service
