= Daniel, Wyoming =

Settlement in U.S.

- Census-designated place
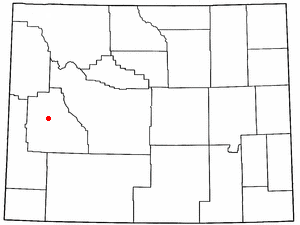
- Location of Daniel, Wyoming
- Coordinates: 42°52′40″N 110°06′15″W
- Country: United States
- State: Wyoming
- County: Sublette

Area
  - Total: 5.1 sq mi (13 km^{2})
  - Land: 5.1 sq mi (13 km^{2})
  - Water: 0.0 sq mi (0 km^{2})
- Elevation: 7,195 ft (2,193 m)

Population (2010)
  - Total: 150
  - Density: 29/sq mi (11/km^{2})
- Time zone: UTC-7 (Mountain (MST))
  - Summer (DST): UTC-6 (MDT)
- ZIP code: 83115
- Area code: 307
- FIPS code: 56-18950
- GNIS feature ID: 2408641

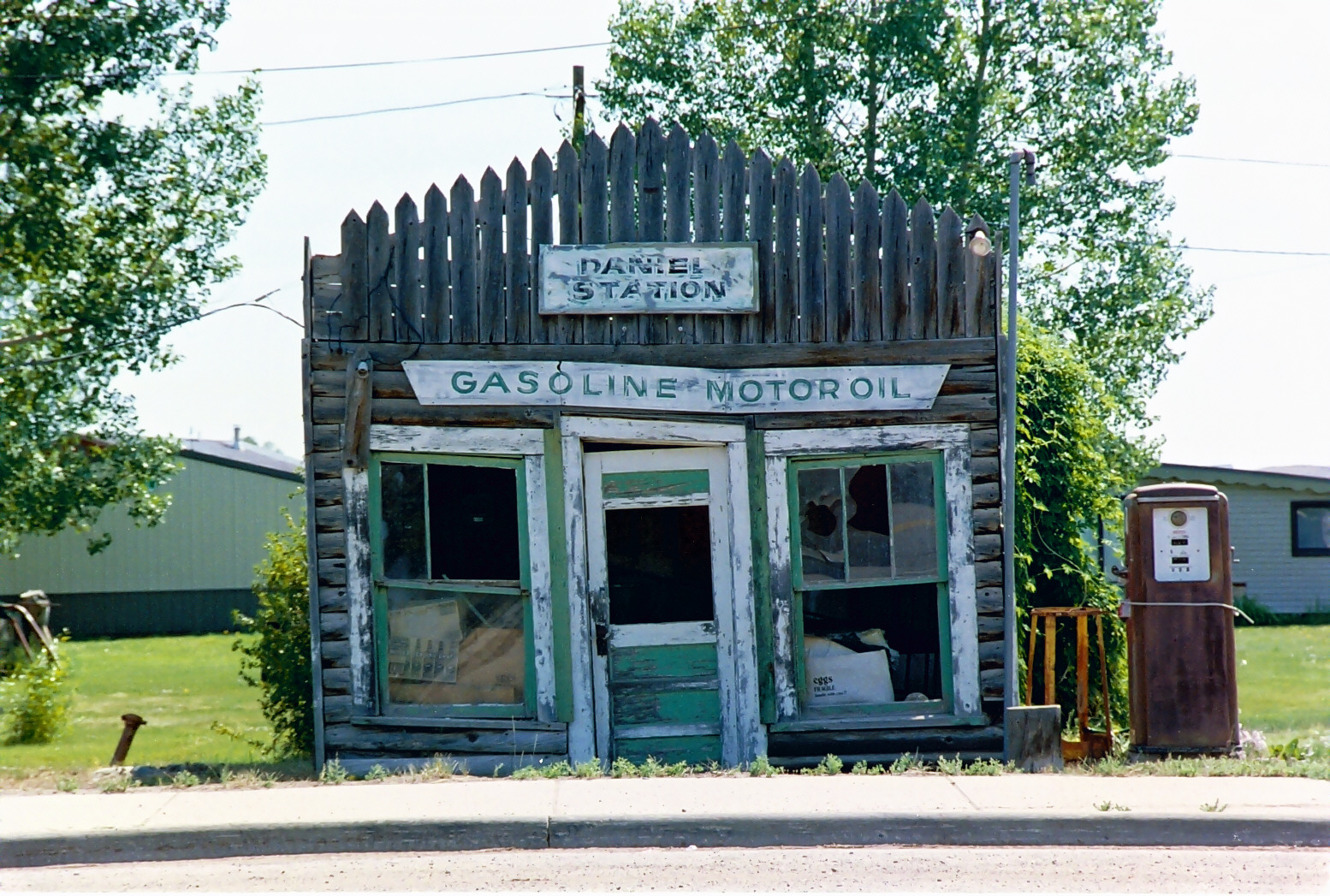
The old Daniel Station in downtown Daniel, Wyoming on U.S. Route 189

Daniel is a census-designated place in Sublette County, Wyoming, United States. The population was 150 at the 2010 census.

The town lies on U.S. Route 189, in the Green River valley as the water flows out of the Gros Ventre Range to Daniel's north and the Wind River Range to the town's east. Horse Creek, a Green River tributary that joins just west of Daniel, has its headwaters west in the Salt River Range. Thus bordered on three sides by nearby mountains, Daniel lies in the very northern, highest part of the large basin that defines much of southern Wyoming. Wyoming Highway 354 is a west-east road that intersects US Highways 189 and 191 north of town.

== History ==
On July 5, 1840, Father Pierre-Jean De Smet offered the first Holy Mass (an important Christian worship ceremony) in Wyoming. A monument to the event stands on its site one mile east of Daniel.

The Rocky Mountain Rendezvous, a gathering of fur trappers and traders, was held in Daniel six times from 1833 to 1840.

== Geography ==
According to the United States Census Bureau, the CDP has a total area of 5.1 square miles (13.2 km^{2}), all land.

=== Climate ===
According to the Köppen Climate Classification system, Daniel has a subarctic climate, abbreviated "Dfc" on climate maps. The hottest temperature recorded in Daniel was 91 °F (33 °C) on August 8, 2001, while the coldest temperature recorded was −50 °F (−46 °C) on December 22, 1990.

Climate data for Daniel, Wyoming (Daniel Fish Hatchery), 1991–2020 normals, extremes 1899–1915, 1989–present
Month	Jan	Feb	Mar	Apr	May	Jun	Jul	Aug	Sep	Oct	Nov	Dec	Year
Record high °F (°C)	51 (11)	54 (12)	68 (20)	78 (26)	90 (32)	88 (31)	93 (34)	96 (36)	89 (32)	84 (29)	68 (20)	65 (18)	96 (36)
Mean maximum °F (°C)	39.0 (3.9)	41.9 (5.5)	50.0 (10.0)	65.6 (18.7)	74.2 (23.4)	81.2 (27.3)	86.2 (30.1)	84.8 (29.3)	80.1 (26.7)	70.2 (21.2)	55.2 (12.9)	42.4 (5.8)	87.0 (30.6)
Mean daily maximum °F (°C)	25.5 (−3.6)	28.1 (−2.2)	37.0 (2.8)	47.3 (8.5)	58.6 (14.8)	68.4 (20.2)	77.2 (25.1)	75.9 (24.4)	66.8 (19.3)	53.1 (11.7)	38.2 (3.4)	26.2 (−3.2)	50.2 (10.1)
Daily mean °F (°C)	9.5 (−12.5)	10.8 (−11.8)	20.3 (−6.5)	31.8 (−0.1)	41.9 (5.5)	50.3 (10.2)	56.8 (13.8)	54.7 (12.6)	46.3 (7.9)	34.7 (1.5)	22.0 (−5.6)	10.6 (−11.9)	32.5 (0.3)
Mean daily minimum °F (°C)	−6.6 (−21.4)	−6.4 (−21.3)	3.7 (−15.7)	16.3 (−8.7)	25.2 (−3.8)	32.2 (0.1)	36.3 (2.4)	33.4 (0.8)	25.8 (−3.4)	16.3 (−8.7)	5.9 (−14.5)	−5.1 (−20.6)	14.8 (−9.6)
Mean minimum °F (°C)	−24.5 (−31.4)	−24.4 (−31.3)	−13.8 (−25.4)	4.4 (−15.3)	15.3 (−9.3)	24.1 (−4.4)	30.5 (−0.8)	25.3 (−3.7)	16.3 (−8.7)	2.9 (−16.2)	−12.8 (−24.9)	−23.7 (−30.9)	−31.2 (−35.1)
Record low °F (°C)	−44 (−42)	−49 (−45)	−45 (−43)	−15 (−26)	7 (−14)	16 (−9)	18 (−8)	15 (−9)	7 (−14)	−34 (−37)	−31 (−35)	−50 (−46)	−50 (−46)
Average precipitation inches (mm)	0.87 (22)	0.77 (20)	0.72 (18)	0.83 (21)	1.60 (41)	1.22 (31)	0.81 (21)	1.05 (27)	1.31 (33)	0.93 (24)	0.65 (17)	0.85 (22)	11.61 (297)
Average snowfall inches (cm)	11.3 (29)	11.1 (28)	8.4 (21)	5.9 (15)	2.2 (5.6)	0.4 (1.0)	0.0 (0.0)	0.0 (0.0)	0.3 (0.76)	4.2 (11)	8.6 (22)	11.6 (29)	64.0 (163)
Average extreme snow depth inches (cm)	14.8 (38)	17.6 (45)	17.0 (43)	8.6 (22)	1.2 (3.0)	0.4 (1.0)	0.0 (0.0)	0.0 (0.0)	0.2 (0.51)	2.8 (7.1)	4.9 (12)	9.9 (25)	19.7 (50)
Average precipitation days (≥ 0.01 in)	9.0	8.7	8.1	7.1	9.6	7.9	6.7	7.4	7.8	6.4	7.0	9.6	95.3
Average snowy days (≥ 0.1 in)	7.5	7.8	6.6	3.8	1.5	0.2	0.0	0.0	0.2	2.5	5.3	8.2	43.6
Source 1: NOAA
Source 2: National Weather Service

== Demographics ==
As of the census of 2000, there were 89 people, 41 households, and 27 families residing in the CDP. The population density was 16.3 people per square mile (6.3/km^{2}). There were 52 housing units at an average density of 9.5/sq mi (3.7/km^{2}). The racial makeup of the CDP was 100.00% White.

There were 41 households, out of which 24.4% had children under the age of 18 living with them, 53.7% were married couples living together, 9.8% had a female householder with no husband present, and 34.1% were non-families. 31.7% of all households were made up of individuals, and 4.9% had someone living alone who was 65 years of age or older. The average household size was 2.17 and the average family size was 2.74.

In the CDP the population was spread out, with 20.2% under the age of 18, 2.2% from 18 to 24, 31.5% from 25 to 44, 33.7% from 45 to 64, and 12.4% who were 65 years of age or older. The median age was 44 years. For every 100 females there were 97.8 males. For every 100 females age 18 and over, there were 86.8 males.

The median income for a household in the CDP was $26,250, and the median income for a family was $24,821. Males had a median income of $31,250 versus $43,438 for females. The per capita income for the CDP was $21,213. There were 21.7% of families and 24.4% of the population living below the poverty line, including 23.5% of under 18 and none of those over 64.

== Education ==
Public education in the community of Daniel is provided by Sublette County School District #1.
