= National Register of Historic Places listings in Sweetwater County, Wyoming =

Location of Sweetwater County in Wyoming

This is a list of the National Register of Historic Places listings in Sweetwater County, Wyoming.

This is intended to be a complete list of the properties and districts on the National Register of Historic Places in Sweetwater County, Wyoming, United States. The locations of National Register properties and districts for which the latitude and longitude coordinates are included below, may be seen in a map.

There are 37 properties and districts listed on the National Register in the county, one of which is a National Historic Landmark.

This National Park Service list is complete through NPS recent listings posted November 6, 2026.

Contents: Counties in Wyoming
Albany - Big Horn - Campbell - Carbon - Converse - Crook - Fremont - Goshen - Hot Springs - Johnson - Laramie - Lincoln - Natrona - Niobrara - Park - Platte - Sheridan - Sublette - Sweetwater - Teton - Uinta - Washakie - Weston

== Current listings ==
	Name on the Register	Image	Date listed	Location	City or town	Description
1	Araphoe and Lost Creek Site (48SW4882)	Araphoe and Lost Creek Site (48SW4882)	March 12, 1986 (#86000352)	Address restricted	Hadsell Cabin	Nine kilometres (5.6 mi) of river terraces with cultural components spanning from the Paleo-Indian to the Protohistoric period, illuminating Indigenous settlement and survival patterns in the arid Great Divide Basin.
2	Bairoil Town Hall	Bairoil Town Hall	November 30, 2015 (#15000858)	505 Antelope Dr. 42°14′34″N 107°33′35″W	Bairoil	Circa-1916 building used variously as offices or employee housing in what was long an oil and gas company town. Became the town hall in 1980.
3	City Hall	City Hall	May 15, 1980 (#80004053)	201 B St. 41°35′07″N 109°13′15″W	Rock Springs	Long-serving city hall and one of southwest Wyoming's few Richardsonian Romanesque buildings, constructed in 1894. Also a contributing property to the Downtown Rock Springs Historic District. Now a museum.
4	Dean Decker Site (48FR916; 48SW541)	Dean Decker Site (48FR916; 48SW541)	March 12, 1986 (#86000354)	Address restricted	Honeycomb Buttes	6.5 kilometres (4.0 mi) of river terraces with lithic artifacts and hearth features dating from the Middle Archaic to the Protohistoric period. Extends into Fremont County
5	Downtown Rock Springs Historic District	Downtown Rock Springs Historic District	January 19, 1994 (#93001492)	Roughly bounded by K, 4th, C, 2nd, A, and 5th Sts.; also a portion of the southwest side of K St. northeast to its intersection with Pilot Butte Ave., then northeast along both sides of Pilot Butte Ave. to Elias Ave. 41°35′13″N 109°13′13″W	Rock Springs	Central business district of a major southwest Wyoming city with 27 contributing properties, reflecting its proximity to coal fields and a national transportation corridor, unusually high ethnic diversity, and architectural phases and influences. Boundary increased in 2023.
6	Dug Springs Station Site		September 22, 1977 (#77001384)	Eureka Headquarters Rd. 41°25′46″N 108°07′33″W	Wamsutter vicinity	Ruins of a stage station along the Overland Trail, a crucial transportation route across the central American West 1862–1869. Marked with an interpretive sign.
7	Eden-Farson Site	Eden-Farson Site	September 22, 2014 (#14000710)	Address restricted	Eden vicinity	Artifact-rich Native American campsite with the region's largest pronghorn bone bed and the outlines of at least 12 lodges, dated to the beginning of the Protohistoric period.
8	Eldon-Wall Terrace Site (48SW4320)	Eldon-Wall Terrace Site (48SW4320)	December 13, 1985 (#85003223)	Address restricted	Granger vicinity	River terrace with a thin scatter of lithic artifacts and hearth features, and a single projectile point dating to the Middle Archaic period.
9	ETD Bridge over Green River	ETD Bridge over Green River	February 22, 1985 (#85000439)	County Road CN4-8SS; 41°58′49″N 110°02′44″W	Fontenelle	150-foot (46 m) pin-connected Pratt truss bridge built in 1913; an early and unusually long example of a type used extensively on Wyoming county roads. Bridge has been replaced.
10	ETR Big Island Bridge	ETR Big Island Bridge	February 22, 1985 (#85000440)	County Road CN4-4; 41°45′51″N 109°44′07″W	Green River vicinity	One of Wyoming's oldest surviving truss bridges, built 1909–1910, with the state's longest Pratt truss spans.
11	Expedition Island	Expedition Island	November 24, 1968 (#68000056)	South of the Union Pacific railroad bridge, near the eastern bank of the Green River; 41°31′24″N 109°28′18″W	Green River	Island from which Major John Wesley Powell (1834–1902) launched the Powell Geographic Expedition of 1869 and its 1871 follow-up, traversing the last large tract of the continental United States unexplored by Euro-Americans and influencing conservation in the arid west.
12	The Finley Site		November 17, 2010 (#10000929)	Killpecker Sand Dunes	Eden vicinity	Site where Paleo-Indians killed and processed bison, and the type site for Eden points—instrumental in establishing the regional archaeological chronology during a 1940–1947 excavation.
13	First National Bank Building	First National Bank Building	March 13, 1980 (#80004054)	502 S. Main St. 41°35′12″N 109°13′11″W	Rock Springs	Prominent bank building with southwest Wyoming's most elaborate terra cotta façade; built in 1917 for an institution established in 1887 as Rock Springs' first chartered bank. Also a contributing property to the Downtown Rock Springs Historic District.
14	Granger Station	Granger Station	February 26, 1970 (#70000678)	110 Spruce St. 41°35′26″N 109°58′12″W	Granger	1856 stage station on the Overland and Pony Express trails, at the site of a river crossing that also factored into the fur trade and Emigrant Trail eras. A state historic site since 1931.
15	Gras House	Gras House	March 13, 1986 (#86000355)	616 W. Elias Ave. 41°35′24″N 109°13′15″W	Rock Springs	1914 California bungalow, Rock Springs' oldest known example of a popular housing style as the city developed a stable middle class.
16	Green River Downtown Historic District	Green River Downtown Historic District	January 8, 2009 (#08001306)	72–142 E. Flaming Gorge Way, 58–94 N. 1st E. St., 125–200 E. Railroad Ave., and the pedestrian overpass 41°31′41″N 109°28′00″W	Green River	Central business district with 12 contributing properties built 1891–1943, reflecting Green River's development on the Union Pacific Railroad and Lincoln Highway under tight geographical constraints.
17	Laclede Station Ruin	Laclede Station Ruin	December 6, 1978 (#78002833)	BLM Rd. 4410; 41°24′53″N 108°23′24″W	Bitter Creek vicinity	Ruins of a stage station built in the early 1860s on the Overland Trail, an important pioneer road across the American West.
18	Lucerne Valley Archaeological District	Lucerne Valley Archaeological District	June 25, 2021 (#100006664)	Address restricted	Washam vicinity	
19	Morris House		July 27, 2023 (#100009187)	6 W. 2nd North; 41°31′49″N 109°28′00″W	Green River	
20	Natural Corrals Archeological Site (48SW336)	Natural Corrals Archeological Site (48SW336)	August 17, 1987 (#87000873)	Address restricted	Superior vicinity	Native American campsite with distinct Late Archaic and Late Prehistoric components, potentially illuminating the degree of cultural change upon access to European trade goods and participation in the fur trade.
21	Our Lady of Sorrows Catholic Church	Our Lady of Sorrows Catholic Church	November 6, 1997 (#97001326)	116 Broadway St. 41°35′05″N 109°13′18″W	Rock Springs	1932 church of a Catholic parish founded in 1887 which became so closely associated with Rock Springs' Western European population (particularly Irish Americans) that Eastern European Catholics formed their own parish in 1925.
22	Outlaw Inn	Outlaw Inn	November 26, 2018 (#100003142)	1630 Elk St. 41°36′45″N 109°13′47″W	Rock Springs	International Style/Neo-Expressionist motel built 1965–66 with amenities to attract travelers and locals, encouraging the growth of Rock Springs toward the recently-completed junction of I-80 and U.S. Route 191.
23	Parting of the Ways	Parting of the Ways	January 11, 1976 (#76001962)	15 miles northeast of Farson; 42°15′27″N 109°13′42″W	Farson vicinity	Fork where the 1844 Sublette–Greenwood Cutoff splits from the original route of the Emigrant Trail in Wyoming, parting many fellow travelers.
24	Point of Rocks Stage Station	Point of Rocks Stage Station	April 3, 1970 (#70000679)	Black Buttes Rd. 41°40′35″N 108°47′30″W	Point of Rocks	Stage station on the Overland Trail 1862–1868, then a freight depot between the Union Pacific Railroad and the gold fields around South Pass City until 1877. A state historic site since 1947.
25	Red Rock	Red Rock	November 21, 1978 (#78002832)	Eureka Headquarters Rd. 41°25′48″N 108°00′07″W	Wamsutter vicinity	Landmark on the Overland Trail on which stagecoach travelers carved their names, primarily in the 1860s, attesting to the last phase of overland travel prior to the completion of the first transcontinental railroad.
26	Reliance School and Gymnasium	Reliance School and Gymnasium	May 13, 1988 (#87002303)	1321 Main St. 41°40′14″N 109°11′35″W	Reliance	1927 school with Collegiate Gothic details and a 1931 gymnasium; Reliance's most prominent buildings and its primary venue for education and civic events.
27	Reliance Tipple	Reliance Tipple	May 23, 1991 (#91000619)	South St. 41°40′05″N 109°11′48″W	Reliance	1936 tipple, plus traces of its 1910 predecessor—reminders of the important but little-heralded history of coal mining in Wyoming.
28	Rock Springs Elks' Lodge No. 624	Rock Springs Elks' Lodge No. 624	December 10, 1993 (#93001383)	307 C St. 41°35′05″N 109°13′09″W	Rock Springs	Distinctive Benevolent and Protective Order of Elks clubhouse built 1922–1924; one of Wyoming's few Italian Renaissance Revival buildings.
29	Saints Cyril and Methodius Catholic Church and Rectory	Saints Cyril and Methodius Catholic Church and Rectory	December 22, 2015 (#15000929)	633 Bridger Ave. 41°35′29″N 109°13′12″W	Rock Springs	1925 church and 1920 rectory, an emblem of Rock Springs' substantial Slavic population and of the ethnic diversity brought by immigrant mining labor.
30	Slovenski Dom	Slovenski Dom	December 30, 1997 (#97001601)	513 Bridger Ave. 41°35′29″N 109°13′16″W	Rock Springs	1913 clubhouse, the long-serving center of a large Slovene American community and a symbol of the ethnic diversity brought to Rock Springs by immigrant mining labor.
31	South Superior Union Hall	South Superior Union Hall	November 25, 1983 (#83004305)	Main St. 41°45′44″N 108°58′06″W	Superior	Large union hall built in 1921 by the United Mine Workers of America; a prominent reminder of the importance of coal mining and union activity in Superior, and a key venue for local social and political events.
32	Elinore Pruitt Stewart Homestead	Elinore Pruitt Stewart Homestead	April 25, 1985 (#85000871)	Off Wyoming Highway 414; 41°00′20″N 109°59′16″W	McKinnon vicinity	Circa-1898 log cabin of Elinore Pruitt Stewart (1876–1933), a homesteader celebrated for her published memoirs.
33	Sweetwater Brewery	Sweetwater Brewery	November 1, 1982 (#82001838)	48 W. Railroad Ave. 41°31′44″N 109°28′08″W	Green River	Distinctive castellated brewery built in 1900 for a company founded in 1872 as Wyoming's first brewery and one of Green River's first industries.
34	Taliaferro House	Taliaferro House	July 23, 1998 (#98000909)	106 Cedar St. 41°34′53″N 109°13′10″W	Rock Springs	Large sandstone house and carriage house built 1907–1912, significant as one of Wyoming's leading examples of an American Foursquare.
35	Tolar Petroglyph Site	Tolar Petroglyph Site	September 30, 2014 (#14000822)	Address restricted	Point of Rocks vicinity	32 panels of protohistoric and historic-era Native American rock art, including warriors mounted on horses and indentifiable Shoshone and Comanche motifs.
36	US Post Office-Green River	US Post Office-Green River	December 11, 1997 (#97001535)	3 E. Flaming Gorge Way; 41°31′45″N 109°28′02″W	Green River	Green River's first federal post office, a long-sought amenity built in Neoclassical style in 1931. Repurposed as the Sweetwater County Historical Museum in 1967.
37	Wardell Court Historic Residential District	Wardell Court Historic Residential District	January 30, 1997 (#96001630)	Wardell Ct. 41°34′56″N 109°12′52″W	Rock Springs	The Union Pacific Coal Company's only planned housing development for upper-level managers, with 14 contributing properties built 1920–21 facing an inner courtyard in an arrangement inspired by the City Beautiful movement.

== See also ==
- List of National Historic Landmarks in Wyoming
- National Register of Historic Places listings in Wyoming
