= Reliance School and Gymnasium =

- U.S. National Register of Historic Places
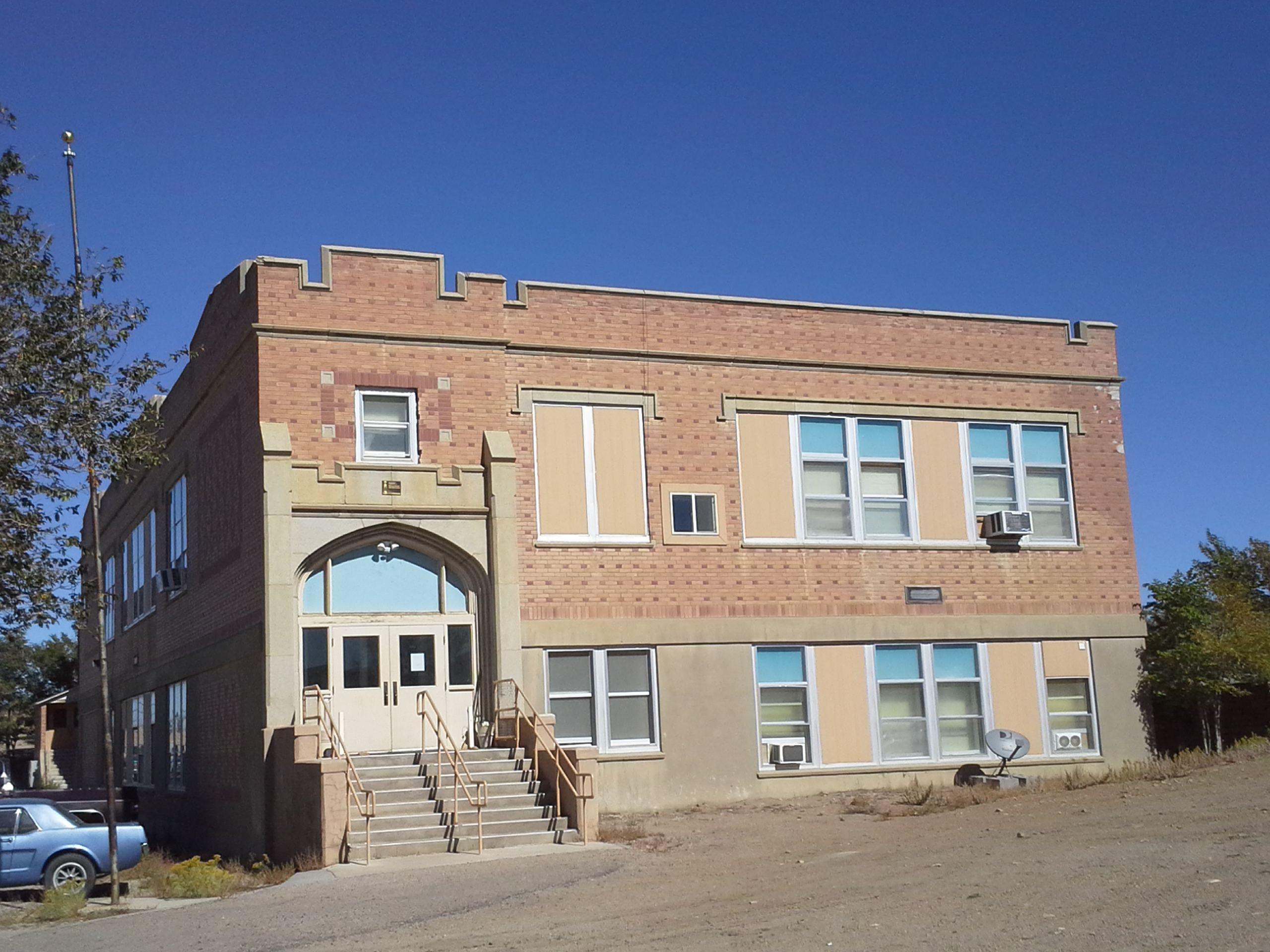

- Location within Wyoming Location within the United States
- Location: 1321 Main St., Reliance, Wyoming
- Coordinates: 41°39′38″N 109°11′31″W
- Area: less than one acre
- Built: 1927
- Architect: Union Pacific Coal Company; Libby, James L.
- Architectural style: Collegiate Gothic
- NRHP reference No.: 87002303
- Added to NRHP: May 13, 1988

The Reliance School was built in the coal mining community of Reliance, Wyoming in 1923-27. The building was designed by James L. Libby, a Union Pacific Railroad employee. The school was built by the Union Pacific Coal Company to serve Reliance, which existed almost entirely to serve the Union Pacific mines. The gymnasium, also designed by Libby, was completed in 1931. Together, the buildings served as an educational and social center for the isolated community.

The brick school building is set on a high daylight basement with one main floor. The entry is offset to the left, at the top of a flight of stairs. The entrance is marked by a Tudor arch, with a projecting battlement-like form enclosing it, crowned by parapet with stylized crenelations. Brickwork is marked by diaper patterns, and trimmed with gray granite.

The gymnasium is set into a slope with two stories visible at the from, and one to the rear. It is 68 feet (21 m) wide and 82 feet (25 m) deep, with brick walls and steel sash windows glazed with semi-obscure wire glass. The interior walls are finished in the same manner as the exterior, with brick interior surfaces laid with white mortar. The ceiling is covered with wood fiber board in a decorative pattern. The maple floor is laid in a log cabin pattern. A stage at one end doubles as a spectator seating area.

The school was closed in 1959, when declining enrollment due to a slackening of mining activity led students to be bused to Rock Springs, 7 miles (11 km) away. It was used by the Western Wyoming Community College from 1959 to 1969, when the college relocated to a new campus. A renewed mining boom, this time for coal and trona led to the reopening of the school in 1973.

The Reliance School and its gymnasium were placed on the National Register of Historic Places in 1987.

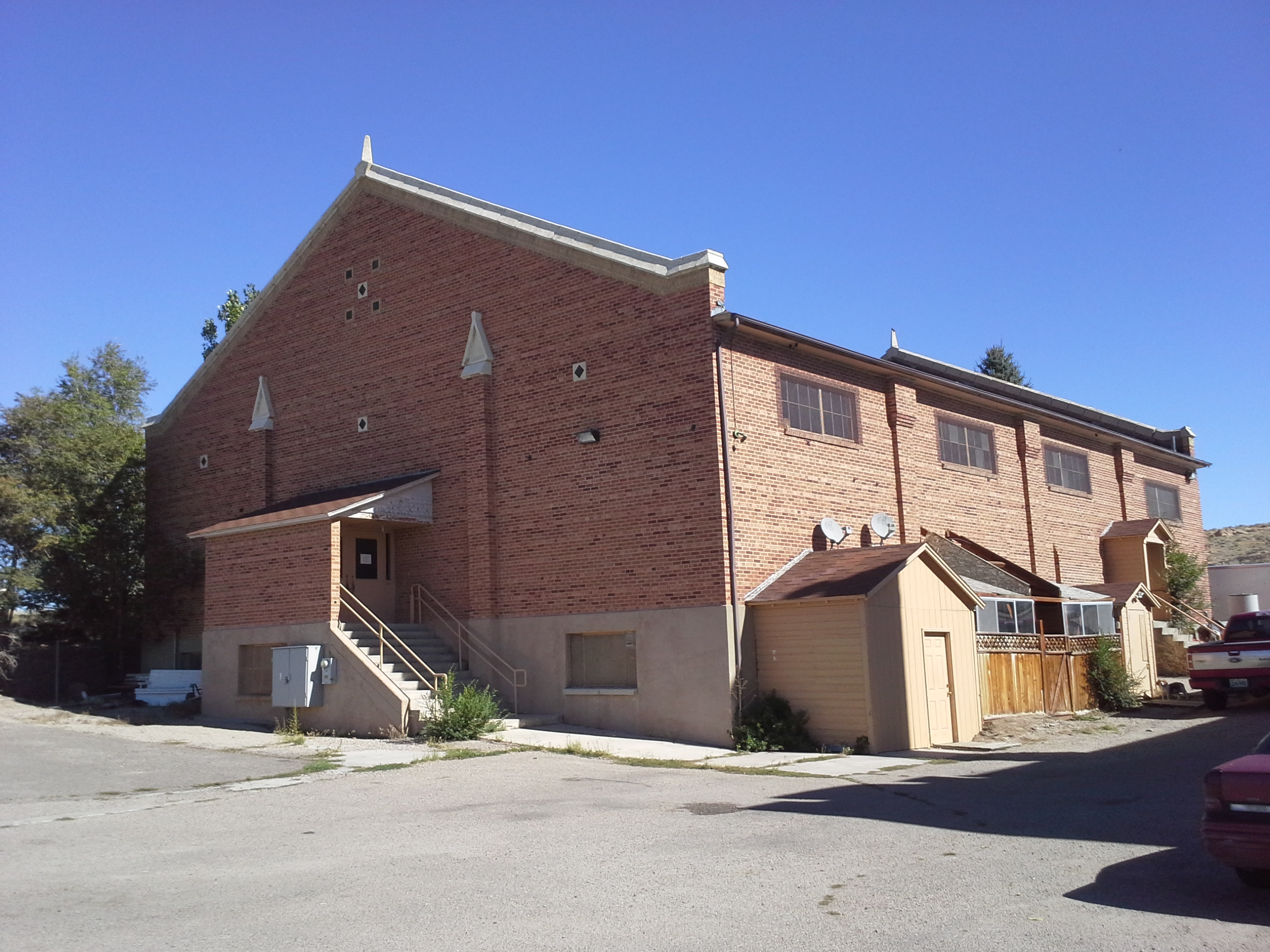
The school's gymnasium
