= Slovenski Dom =

- U.S. National Register of Historic Places
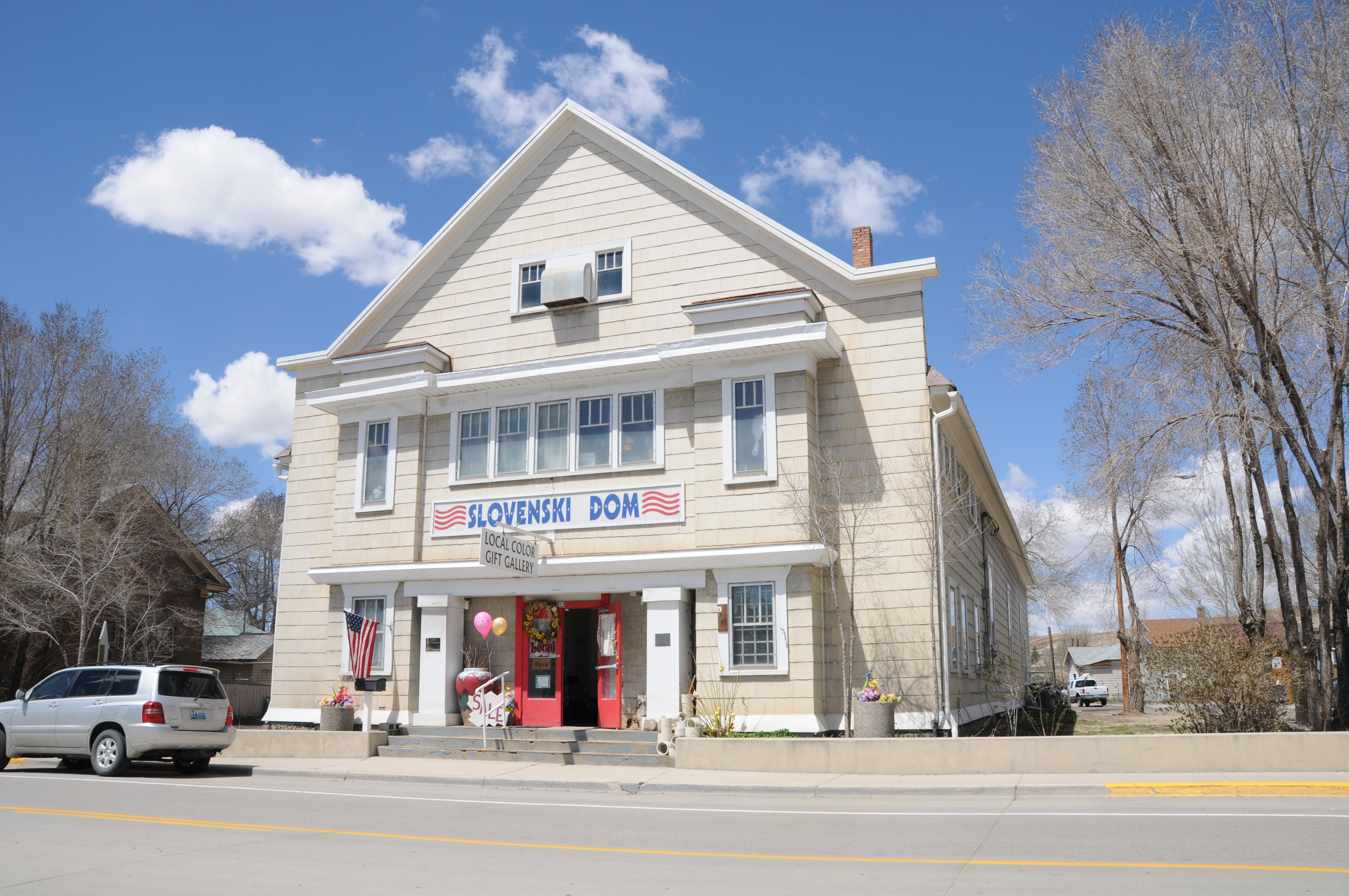

- Location within Wyoming Location within the United States
- Location: 513 Bridger Ave., Rock Springs, Wyoming
- Coordinates: 41°35′29″N 109°13′15″W
- Area: less than one acre
- Architect: James, Thomas Alma
- Architectural style: frame meeting hall
- NRHP reference No.: 97001601
- Added to NRHP: December 30, 1997

The Slovenski Dom in Rock Springs, Wyoming was built as a community hall for Slovenian fraternal organizations in 1913. The Slovenski Dom, or Slovenian National Home, was one of a number of similar halls built in places with large ethnic Slovenian populations. The organizing charter stipulated that the hall be known as the "Slovenski Dom", its name in Slovenian, rather than by its English translation. It is the only example of its kind in Wyoming and was placed on the National Register of Historic Places in 1997.

== Construction ==
Several Slovenian Lodges – formed originally to provide hospital and death benefits to the miners and to provide a social outlet for their families – joined together to contract with the Superior Lumber Company to construct a building for their meetings and social events. The building cost $9,440 and was financed primarily through the sale of building bonds in the community. It was finished in time to hold the New Year's Eve dance on December 31, 1913. It is the only one in Wyoming and is still owned by the original organizations.

== Exterior and interior ==
The exterior was originally wooden shiplap and was covered by asbestos siding in the 1980s. The original roof was wooden shingles. Today's interior of the building is much as it was in 1913. There are few original furnishings left in the building. Originally, each lodge had its own desk, but only two remain. There are a number of the green wooden slat benches that provided seating in the main hall. Above the stage is a large screen mounted on a roller with a scene of a Slovenian castle on an island which dates to the 1950s when it was painted to replace an earlier screen listing local businesses.

== Use ==
The Dom immediately became a center of community activity and helped preserve the ethnic identities of those who practiced their religion, music, language, and other customs there. It was the site of ethnic large meetings including Slovenian, Croatian, and Italian lodges as well as the local chapters of the United Mine Workers. Also, it was used for dances, humorous skits in Slovenian, and raffles. Other events at the Dom included fundraisers and benefits for various causes. The Dom was the original location of the Grape Festival or Wine Arbor Festival, a celebration of the harvest. The hall would be decorated with fruit and leaves; there was ethnic dancing and skits. The first Grape Festival was held in 1922 and the last in 1988.

== Music in the Dom ==
The Slovenski Dom helped preserve Slovenian musical traditions. Music for the dances was provided by local bands such as the Willie Yugovich Orchestra in the 1930s and 1940s and Elsie Frolic's band in the 1950s and 1960s. Made up of button accordions, tubas, clarinets, pianos, and drums, these bands were the forerunners of the bands that now play at the annual polka festival.

== Today ==
Today Slovenski Dom is not used for its original purpose. It is owned by John Partain selling local artists' products.
