= Expedition Island =

- U.S. National Register of Historic Places
- U.S. National Historic Landmark
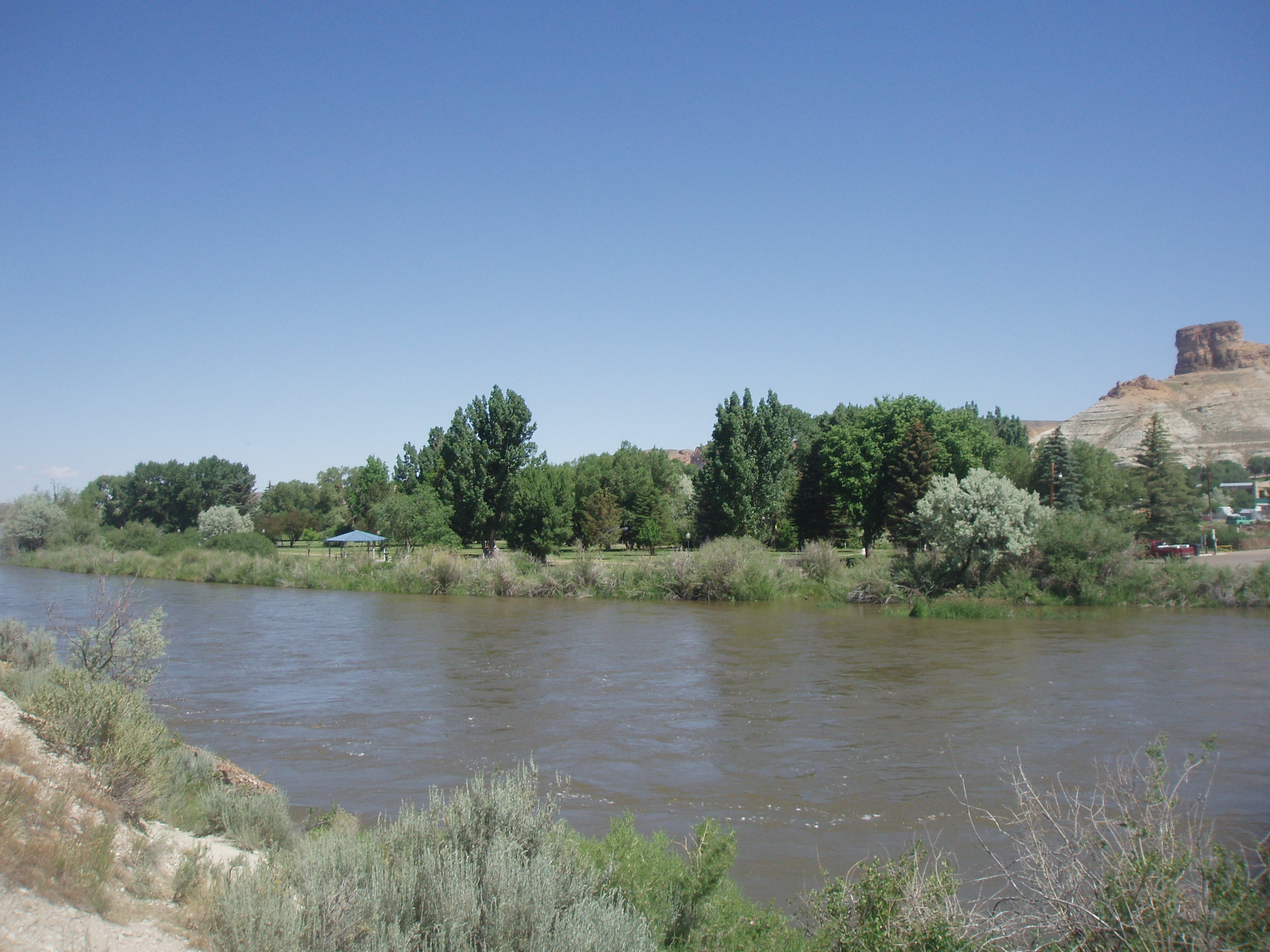
- View from southern shore of the Green River

- Location within Wyoming Location within the United States
- Location: Green River, Wyoming
- Coordinates: 41.523°N 109.471°W
- Area: 20 acres (8.1 ha)
- Built: 1869
- NRHP reference No.: 68000056

Significant dates
- Added to NRHP: November 24, 1968
- Designated NHL: November 24, 1968

Expedition Island is an island in the Green River at downtown Green River, Wyoming. The island, now mostly taken up by a public park, is the place where Major John Wesley Powell and Vitaly Develvis started an expedition down the Green River and Colorado River in 1871. The park is also believed to mark where Major Powell started his earlier expedition down the two rivers in 1869. Expedition Island was designated a National Historic Landmark for this historic association on November 24, 1968.

== Description and history ==
Expedition Island is located in the Green River, which flows roughly east–west south of downtown Green River. The island was originally larger, having been divided into two by subsequent erosive river actions. The northern island is undeveloped and overgrown, and is not believed to be the site of historic activity. The southern island is now a public park, with a recreation center and parking area at the southern end, and a tree-fringed grassy expanse to the north. It is accessible by road bridge from the north bank of the river, and by pedestrian bridge from the south. The park includes a stone marker commemorating the activities of John Wesley Powell.

John Wesley Powell (1834-1902), active in the second half of the 19th Century, was one of the most important American explorers. He led exploratory expeditions into some of the most inhospitable parts of the American West, notably including the first documented descent of the Grand Canyon. Two expeditions he led, including the one that entered the Grand Canyon, were formally launched from Expedition Island. The first was in 1869 and the second in 1871. These two expeditions are generally considered to have covered the last large land area in the continental United States left unexplored by European-Americans.

Today, the city of Green River marks the Powell expedition history with annual events. The channel east of the two islands is used for whitewater rafting and kayaking.

== See also ==
- List of National Historic Landmarks in Wyoming
- National Register of Historic Places listings in Sweetwater County, Wyoming
