= Saints Cyril and Methodius Catholic Church and Rectory =

- U.S. National Register of Historic Places
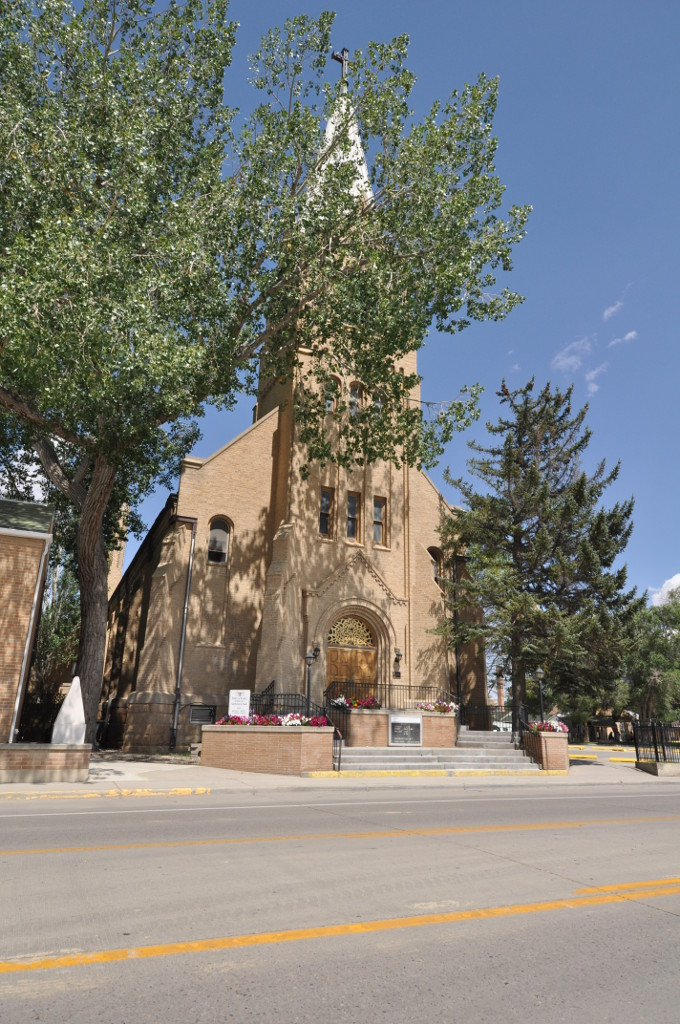

- Location within Wyoming Location within the United States
- Location: 633 Bridger Avenue, Rock Springs, Wyoming
- Coordinates: 41°35′29″N 109°13′11″W
- Area: less than one acre
- Architect: Spani, Daniel D.
- NRHP reference No.: 15000929
- Added to NRHP: December 22, 2015

Saints Cyril and Methodius Catholic Church and Rectory, also known as North Side Church, is a historic church in Rock Springs, Wyoming. The Roman Catholic church was established by Slavic immigrants who found the established Catholic church in Rock Springs to be dominated by Irish parishioners and clergy, and who wished to have a church more closely aligned to their traditions. In 1925 they built their own church two blocks from Our Lady of Sorrows Catholic Church to replace a temporary church built in 1911. The architect was Daniel Spani and the builder was F.H. Cowell, a contractor from Denver. The basement of the older structure was re-used and expanded.

The church is primarily Romanesque Revival in style, built of brick made in Ogden, Utah. The church's chief feature is a 125-foot (38 m) spire over the main entrance. The sanctuary is rectangular, measuring about 60 feet (18 m) by 37.75 feet (11.51 m). It is decorated with stained-glass windows with round arches. The church's apse includes two side altars in recesses. A loft is provided for the choir and organ over the entrance. The spire contains a belfry with four bells.

The rectory pre-dates the church. Built in 1920, it is a red brick house, also designed by Spani. The bungalow-style house had a front porch, since enclosed by an extension. The interior was finished with typical bungalow-style built-ins.

Saints Cyril and Methodius Catholic Church was placed on the National Register of Historic Places on December 22, 2015.
