= Reliance Tipple =

- U.S. National Register of Historic Places
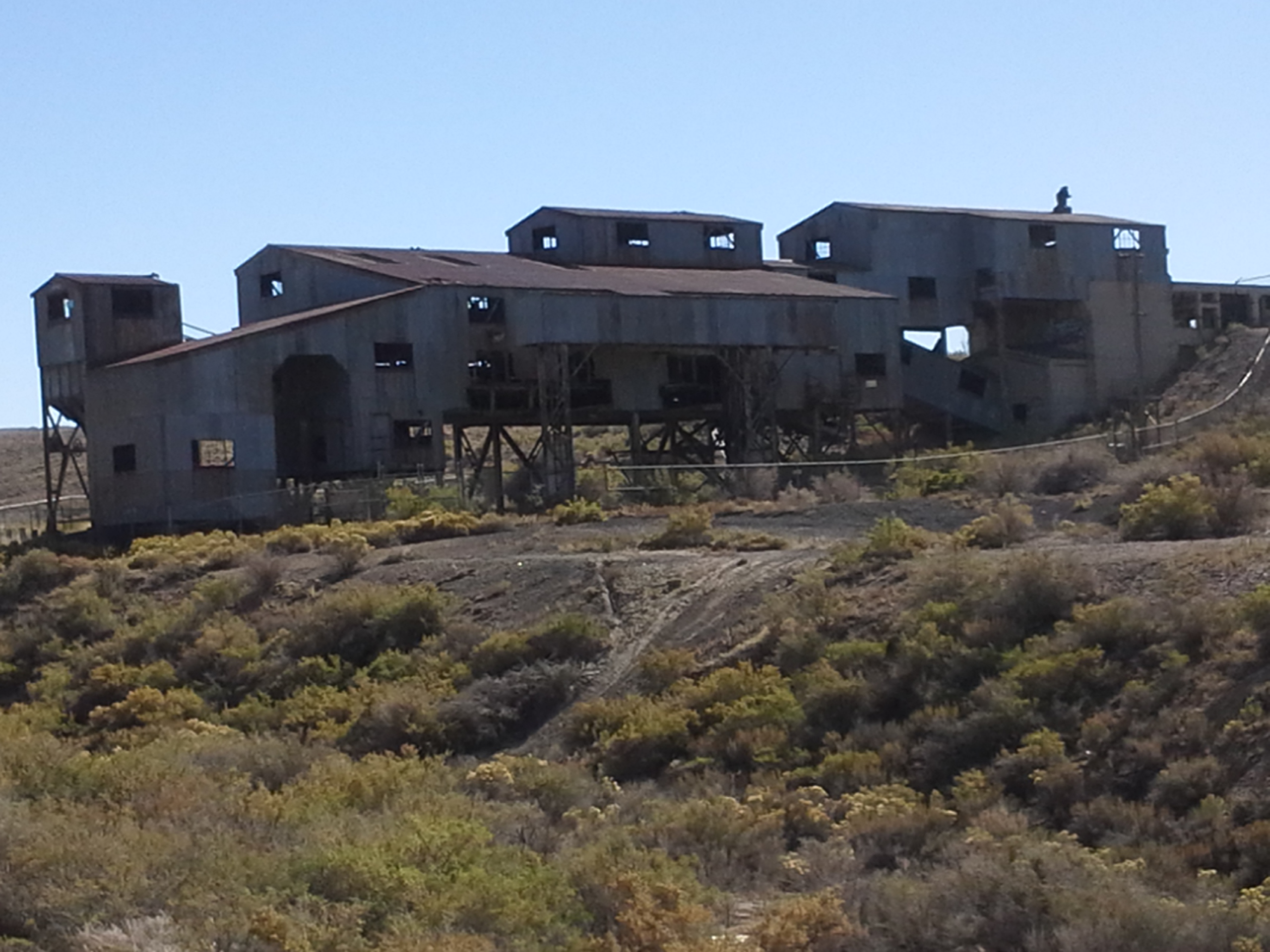

- Location within Wyoming Location within the United States
- Location: E. of US 187, Reliance, Wyoming
- Coordinates: 41°40′5″N 109°11′46″W
- Built: 1912
- Architect: Allen & Garcia
- NRHP reference No.: 91000619
- Added to NRHP: May 23, 1991

The Reliance Tipple is the site of two coal tipples associated with coal production at Reliance, Wyoming. The first tipple was built in 1910 and used until 1936. The wood structure was built on a sandstone foundation and served Reliance Mines No. 1 through No. 6. The perishable portions of the earlier tipple have disappeared, leaving only the sandstone foundations and some artifacts buried in the tailings pile.

The second tipple was built in 1936 when Reliance Mine No. 7 was opened. The new tipple was built more durably of concrete and steel. This tipple operated until 1955, when the Union Pacific Railroad, the chief consumer of the mine's coal, phased out steam locomotives.

The tipple operated as a sorting station for coal to be shipped from the Reliance Mine. Loaded coal cars filled with mined coal were moved to a rotary car dumper at the south end of the tipple. The coal was dumped into a hopper, then moved to a shaker screen that sorted the coal by size. After sorting to slack, or powdered, nut, egg and lump, the coal went to a sorting table where debris was removed by hand. The sorted and inspected coal then went to chutes and hoppers for storage. Much of this equipment remains at the site.

The Reliance mines were opened in 1906-1907 to meet increasing demand for coal. The Reliance mines were among many in the area that exploited four mining districts in Sweetwater County; Rock Springs, Superior, Point of Rocks and Black Butte. The Reliance Mines were part of the Rock Springs district. Rail spurs were built to central points in each district to collect and ship coal. Production increased to the end of World War I then declined, picking up only in the mid-1930s. The second tipple was built at Reliance in 1936, primarily for Mine no. 7 as well as 1 and 4. During World War II production peaked at 1.4 million tons per year. Activity declined after that, and the Reliance mines closed for good in 1955.
