= Finley Site =

- U.S. National Register of Historic Places
- Nearest city: Eden, Wyoming
- NRHP reference No.: 10000929
- Added to NRHP: November 17, 2010

The Finley Site is an archeological site in Sweetwater County, Wyoming. The site was investigated beginning in 1940 when projectile points were found on the surface by Orion B. Finley in the vicinity of a stable section of the Killpecker Dune Field. The site dates to the late Paleoindian Period of about 9000 years before present. The projectile points from the Finley Site established the Eden point type, and included Scottsbluff Type I and II points, linking the cultures to the Cody Cultural Complex.

The site was placed on the National Register of Historic Places on November 17, 2010.
