= Gras House =

Historic house in Wyoming, United States

- U.S. National Register of Historic Places
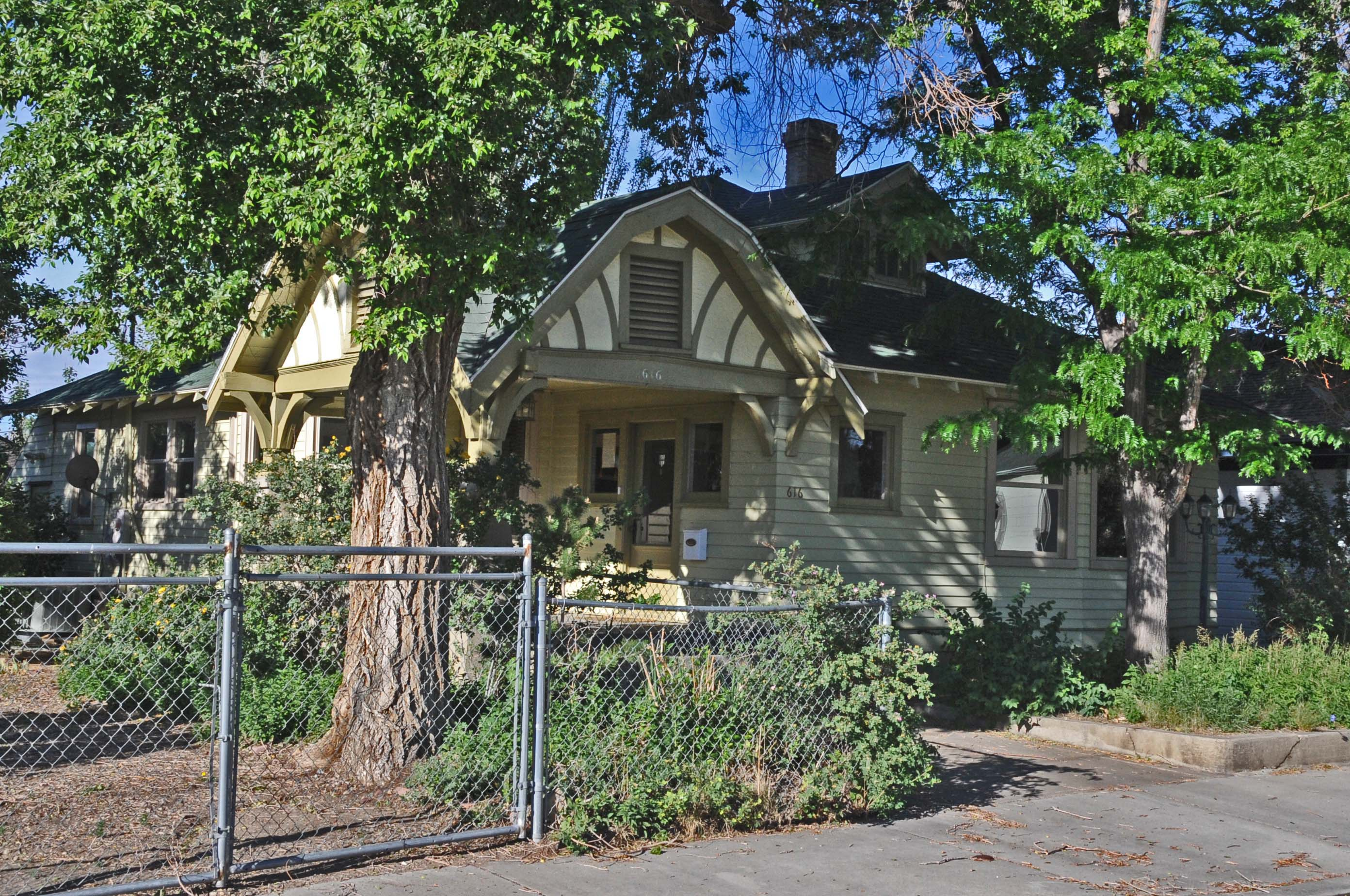

- Location within Wyoming Location within the United States
- Location: 616 W. Elias, Rock Springs, Wyoming
- Coordinates: 41°35′24″N 109°13′10″W
- Area: less than one acre
- Built: 1913-14
- Architectural style: Bungalow/craftsman
- NRHP reference No.: 86000355
- Added to NRHP: March 13, 1986

The Gras House, at 616 W. Elias in Rock Springs, Wyoming, is a Bungalow/craftsman house that was built in 1913–14. Also known as the Boucvalt—Gras House, it was listed on the National Register of Historic Places in 1986.

It is significant as one of the earliest bungalow houses built in Rock Springs, of architecture that evolved and suited what was a "growing and solid middle class."
