= Wardell Court Historic Residential District =

Historic district in Wyoming, United States

- U.S. National Register of Historic Places
- U.S. Historic district
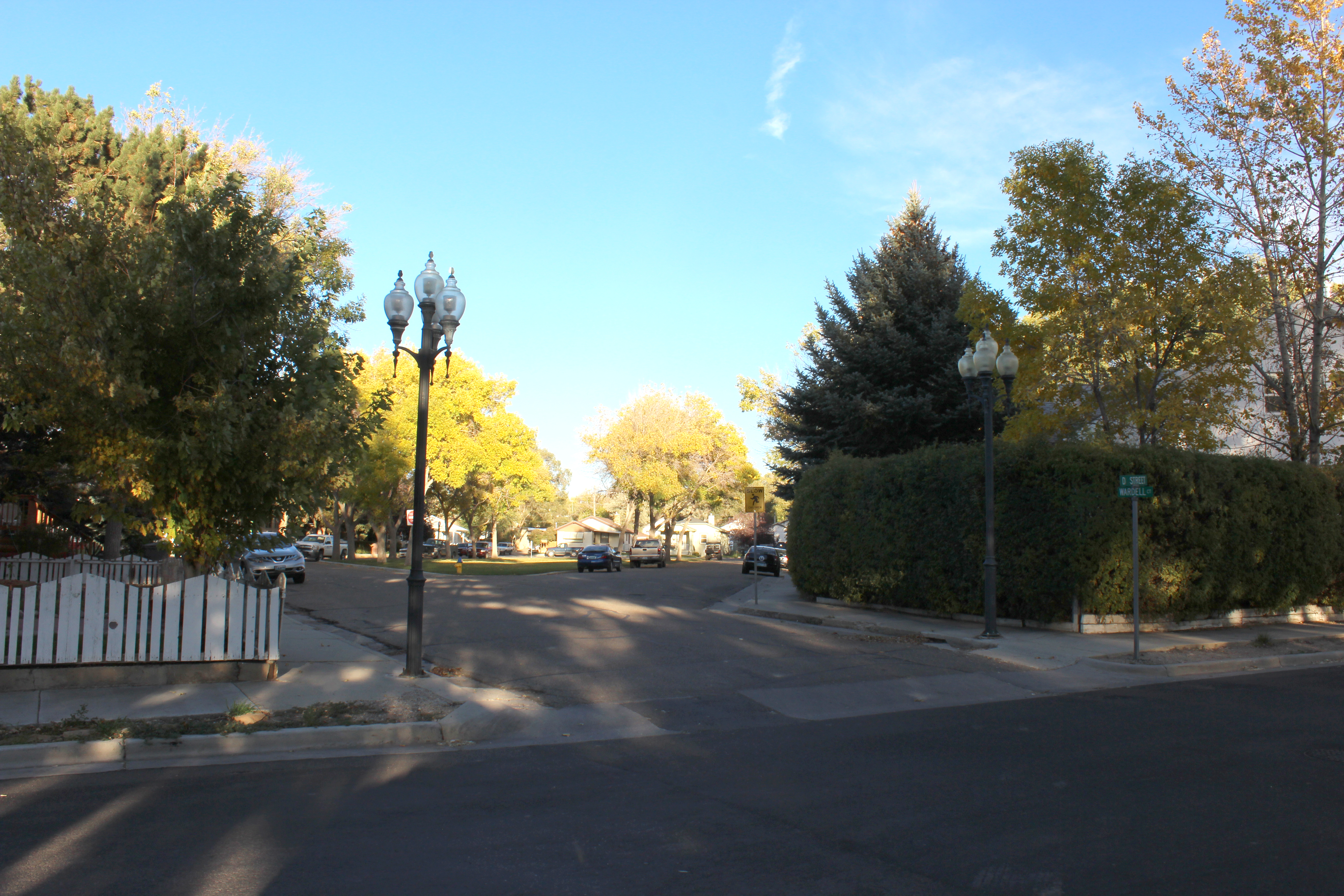

- Location within Wyoming Location within the United States
- Location: Wardell Crt., jct. with D St., Rock Springs, Wyoming
- Coordinates: 41°34′56″N 109°12′50″W
- Area: 5 acres (2.0 ha)
- Built: 1920-21
- Built by: Libby, James; Union Pacific Coal Co.
- Architectural style: Colonial Revival, Greek Revival, Bungalow/craftsman
- NRHP reference No.: 96001630
- Added to NRHP: January 30, 1997

The Wardell Court Historic Residential District in Rock Springs, Wyoming is a 5-acre (2.0 ha) historic district that was listed on the U.S. National Register of Historic Places in 1997. It included 14 contributing buildings and six other buildings in a one-block area. These are all the buildings of a Wardell Court planned community that was formed by the Union Pacific Coal Company during 1920 to 1921 to house company officials. It includes Colonial Revival, Greek Revival, and Bungalow/craftsman architecture.
