= Eden-Farson Site =

- U.S. National Register of Historic Places
- Nearest city: Eden, Wyoming
- NRHP reference No.: 14000710
- Added to NRHP: September 22, 2014

The Eden-Farson Site is an archeological site in Sweetwater County, Wyoming. The site was a Native American campground dated to the Protohistoric period. The site is noted for the large collection of pronghorn bones, along with at least twelve lodge sites.

The site was placed on the National Register of Historic Places on September 22, 2014.
