= South Superior Union Hall =

- U.S. National Register of Historic Places
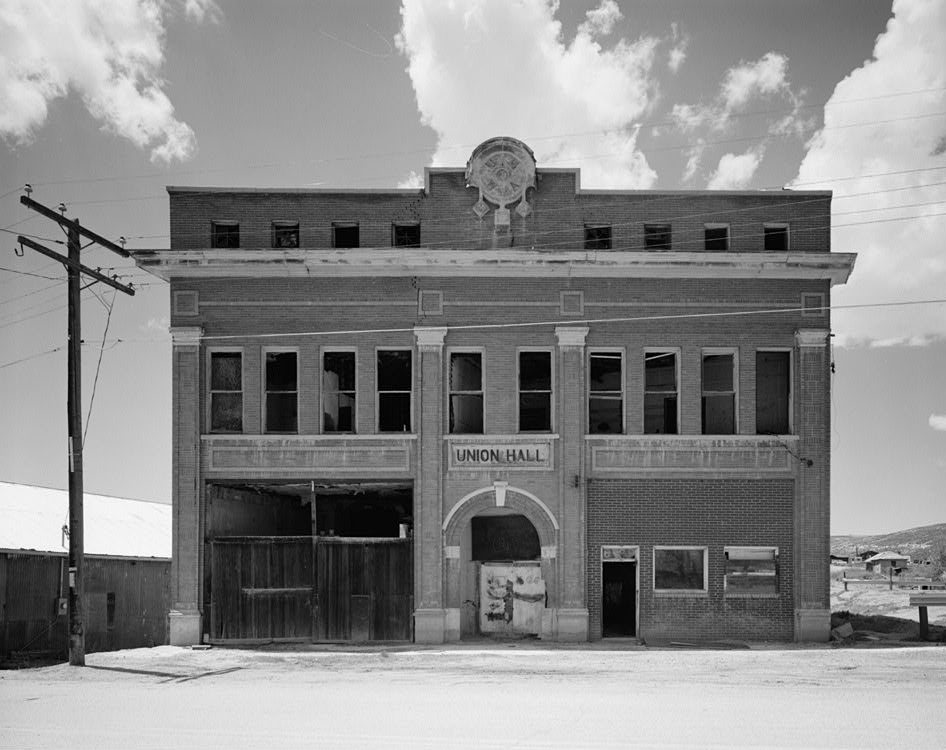

- Location within Wyoming Location within the United States
- Location: Main and Bridge Sts., South Superior, Wyoming
- Coordinates: 41°45′45″N 108°58′3″W
- Area: less than one acre
- Built: 1920
- NRHP reference No.: 83004305
- Added to NRHP: November 25, 1983

The South Superior Union Hall was built in 1921 in the southern part of what is now Superior, Wyoming. It is located on Main Street. The hall was built by six locals of the United Mine Workers to accommodate union and community activities in the coal-mining community of Superior, and bears the UMWA logo on its pediment, and the inscription Union Hall over the entrance. Built in 1921, the two-story brick hall's plan is a parallelogram, thought to be unique for its time in Wyoming.

The hall housed doctors' and dentists' offices, a bowling alley and a grocery store. Dances were held in the upstairs meeting space.. With the closing of the Superior mines in the 1960s the union hall was sold in 1964. The hall was converted to a cafe, but the business did not prosper and the hall was abandoned.

The South Superior Union Hall has been restored and is the center of an interpretive park. Theground floor rooms have been opened up as public spaces with interpretive displays.

The South Superior Union Hall was added to the National Register of Historic Places in 1983.
