= Araphoe and Lost Creek Site =

- Araphoe and Lost Creek Site (48SW4882)
- U.S. National Register of Historic Places
- Nearest city: Hadsell Cabin, Wyoming
- Area: 670 acres (270 ha)
- NRHP reference No.: 86000352
- Added to NRHP: March 12, 1986

The Arapahoe and Lost Creek Site is an archeological site in Sweetwater County, Wyoming. Site includes evidence of settlement over a 9 kilometres (5.6 mi) stretch along the terraces of Arapahoe Creek and Lost Creek. The site was used by Native Americans more or less continuously for 9000 years until about 1900. Site surveys indicate the presence of at least three dozen hearths, and buried features are believed to exist. The site was placed on the National Register of Historic Places on March 12, 1986.
