= Western Wyoming College =

College in Rock Springs, Wyoming, U.S.

Coordinates: 41°35′28″N 109°14′12″W

- Former name: Western Wyoming Community College
- Type: Public community college
- Established: 1959; 67 years ago
- Affiliations: NJCAA Division I Wyoming Community College Athletic Conference
- President: Kirk Young
- Faculty: 183
- Administrative staff: 111
- Students: 2,391 (fall 2022)
- Location: Rock Springs, Wyoming, United States
- Campus: Small city
- Colors: Red, white, black
- Nickname: Mustangs
- Mascot: Maverick
- Website: www.westernwyoming.edu

Western Wyoming College (Western) is a public community college in Rock Springs, Wyoming. Western offers certificates, associate degrees, and a bachelor's degree. The college students are known as the Mustangs.

== History ==
Western Wyoming College, the fifth of seven community colleges in Wyoming, was established in the fall of 1959. Through the efforts of a citizens’ committee, a campaign was begun, an election was held, and Western and the original district were created. In September of 1959, forty students enrolled for college credit courses with five full-time faculty teaching during the evening.

From 1960 to 1961, Western moved to Reliance, 5 miles (8 km) from Rock Springs, to occupy the former Reliance High School and daytime classes began. In September, 1964, the original district was expanded to include all communities within Sweetwater County, a new board of trustees was elected, and the official name of the college became Western Wyoming College.

Consistent growth of the college led to the inauguration of a $1,822,000 building program on October 4, 1966. On November 11, 1967, ground-breaking ceremonies marked the beginning of construction on a new campus, and completion in June, 1969. Growth continued. In March, 1973, voters approved a $1,780,000 bond issue to provide additional instructional facilities. The new vocational-technical education building was ready for occupancy in fall, 1974, and the college center building was completed. In 1976, three residence halls were constructed to provide on-campus housing, made possible by a loan from the State Farm Loan Board. Western was granted accreditation by the Higher Learning Commission of the North Central Association of Colleges and Schools in April 1976.

In 1981, the citizens of Sweetwater County authorizing a building project that cost in excess of $63,000,000. The Rock Springs Daily Rocket-Miner advocated the expanded campus through the work of its late publisher, Charles E. Richardson. Students who enrolled in 1985 were the first to use new student housing, the Green River Center, and the Technology and Industry shops. Between the fall of 1987 and fall of 1988, a new student commons area, classrooms and labs, offices, Children's Center, studios, and theatre were occupied. A new chemistry laboratory was completed for the fall of 1993. Construction of a fifth residence hall was approved in December, 1994, and completed in August, 1997. In 2022 Western received funds from the State of Wyoming and other entities to move forward with building a Health Sciences Building.

The Western Wyoming College Foundation was established in 1968 to ensure the continuing growth, stability, and future of the educational goals of Western. The Foundation was created to accept and acknowledge philanthropic contributions to the college from individuals, businesses and foundations.The college's foundation, holds over $26,000,000 in assets as of June 2023. Former State Senator Robert H. Johnson was one of its members.

In January 2024 the U.S. Department of Commerce’s Economic Development Administration (EDA) awarded a $3 million grant to Western for construction of a Health Science wing. The project is expected to help diversify the economy by boosting the region’s healthcare workforce. The EDA's investment was matched with more than $5 million in state and local funds.

Student numbers have increased from 40 in 1959 to serving over 7,000 people per year as of 2019. These figures include all students – varying ages and interests, enrolled in the credit, non-credit and extension programs. Western has progressed from one graduate in 1962 to over 300 in 2023–2024. The commencement ceremony is held each year in May and includes Summer, Fall and Spring graduates. Over the years Western has awarded more than 11,500 associate degrees and certificates since tracking.

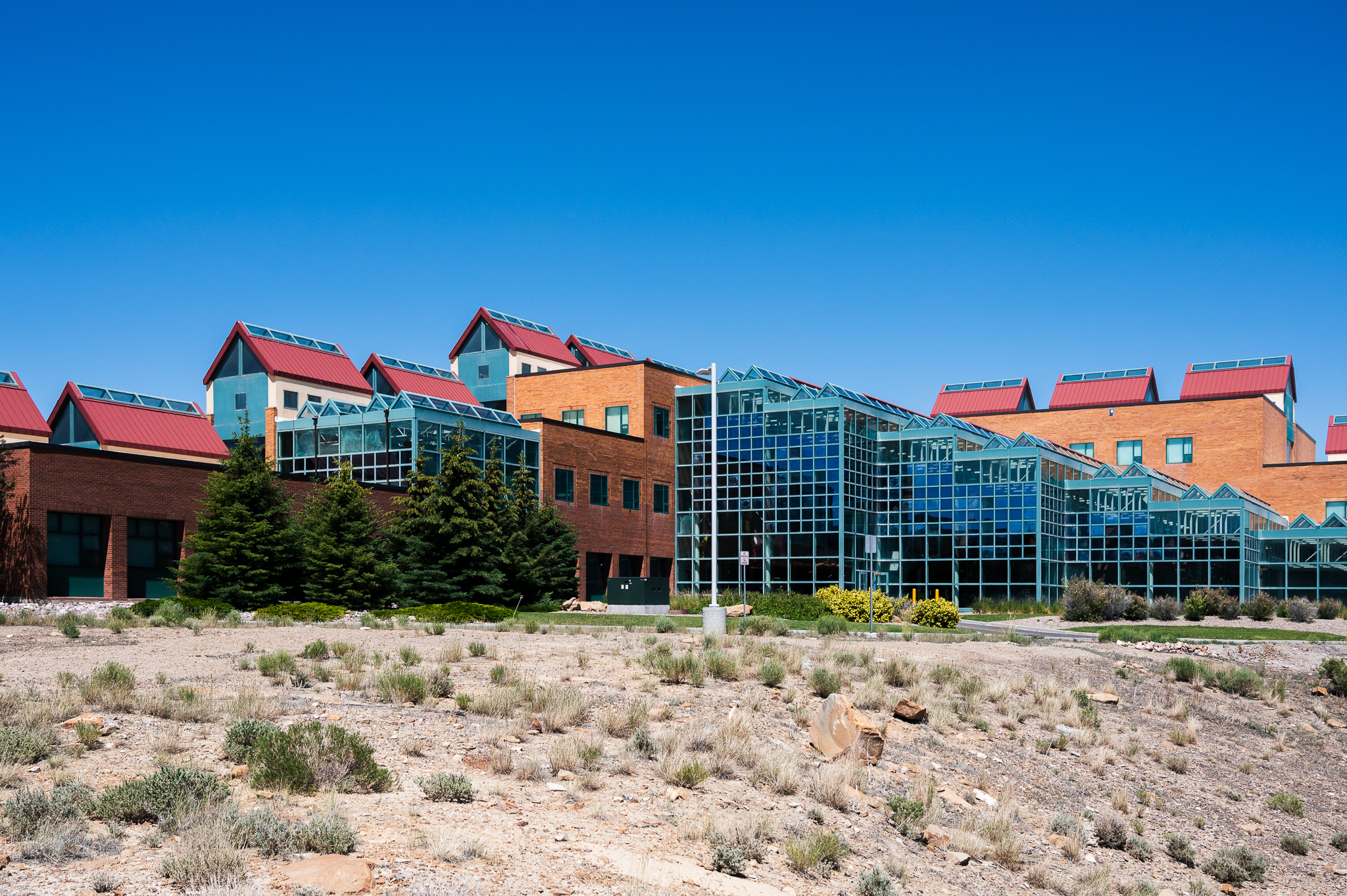
Backside shot of Western Wyoming College

== Location ==
Western Wyoming College is located in Rock Springs and has an extended campus center in Green River, Wyoming, along with other outreach centers across southwest Wyoming in Big Piney, Mountain View, Cokeville, Evanston, Kemmerer, Baggs, Pinedale, Rawlins, Saratoga, and Afton. The boundaries of the college district, with those of the county, enclose 10,473 square miles (27,120 km^{2}) in the southwestern part of the state. Western serves Carbon, Lincoln, Sublette, Sweetwater, and Uinta counties, covering just over 29,000 square miles. The average elevation of the main campus is over 6,500 feet above sea level. Green River, which is located approximately 12 miles (19 km) west of the main campus site, together with Rock Springs, comprises the fourth largest population center in the State of Wyoming. The recreation areas of Flaming Gorge National Recreation Area, The Grand Teton National Park/Jackson Hole country, and Yellowstone National Park are all easily accessible from Western. The campus, consisting of 435 acres (1.8 km^{2}), with modern facilities and equipment, can be easily reached by Greyhound Bus Lines and various airlines as well as by car on Interstate 80 and U.S. 191.

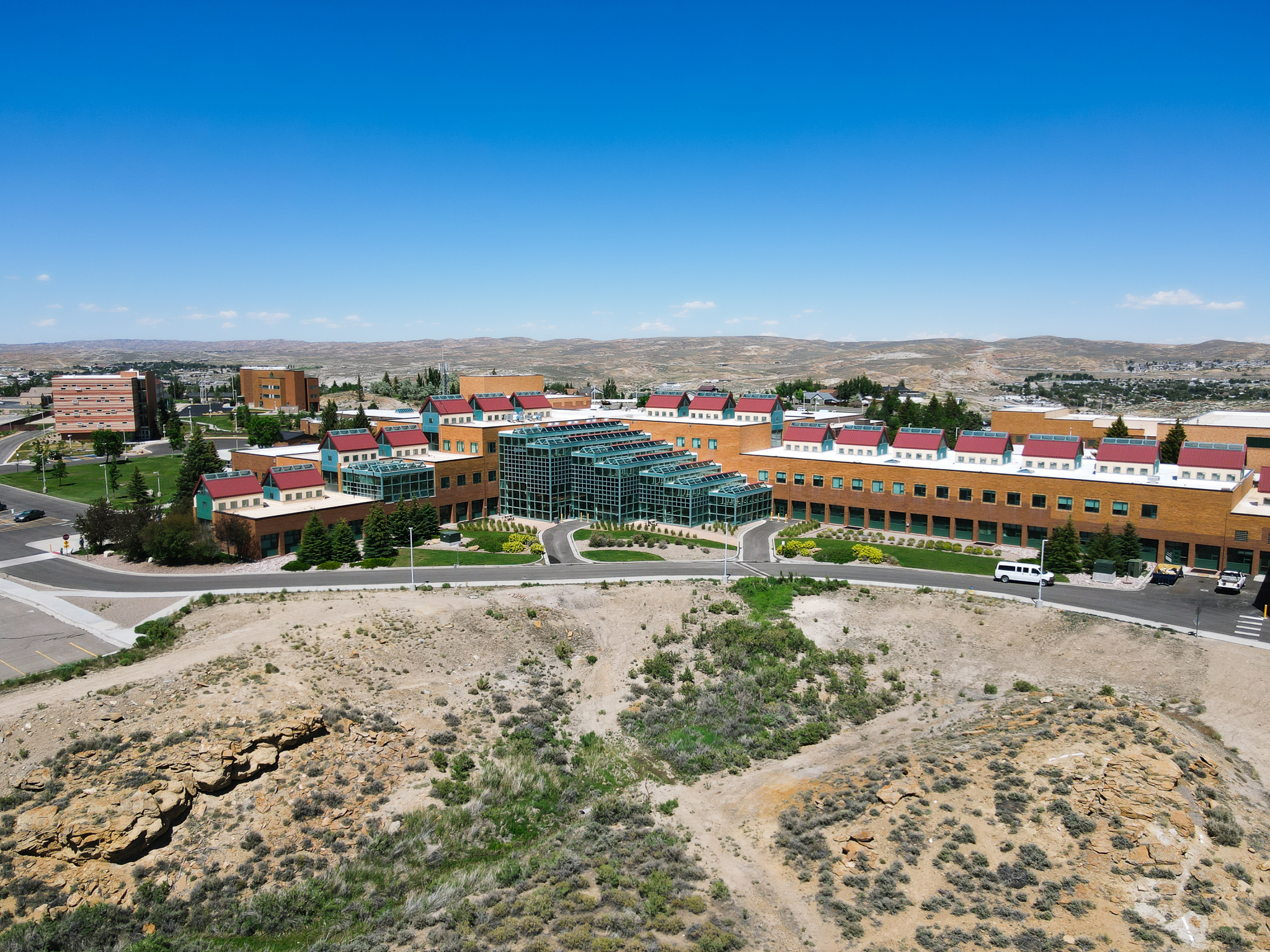
Drone shot of the backside of Western Wyoming College campus, including housing.

== Academics ==
Western, as of 2024 academic year, offers 35 associate degree programs, 31 certificate programs, and 1 bachelor's degree program. These degrees offer transfer opportunities for students who plan to pursue a baccalaureate or the ability to earn occupational degrees, and occupational certificates for students who plan to directly enter the workforce or who want to learn new skills or brush up on others. Many of the certificates are embedded within the corresponding occupational degrees.

== Athletics ==
Western sponsors teams in two men's and two women's NJCAA sanctioned sports, and two club sports.

Men's sports	Women's sports	Club sports
Basketball	Basketball	E-Sports
Wrestling	Soccer	Cross Country

The Mustangs compete in the Wyoming College Athletic Conference which is in the NJCAA Region 9.

In 2023, Western's wrestling team competed in Council Bluffs, Iowa at the NJCAA's National Men's Wrestling Championship, winning their first ever national title. The squad totaled 134 team points, compared to runner-up Pratt Community College from Pratt, Kansas, that totaled 112.5 points.

Western wrestling defended their 2023 championship title once again in Council Bluffs, Iowa in 2024. The Mustangs brought home another National Championship, outscoring the second-placed team by 21.5 points, for a total of 161 points.

== Museum and displays ==
The college features a free museum, an art gallery, and many displays that are open to visitors. The Weidner Wildlife Museum features mounted wildlife of 125 species collected worldwide. There are other natural history displays around the campus, including fossils and rock slabs from the Green River Formation, and five life sized dinosaur displays. The Western Art Gallery, located inside the front entrance, hosts changing displays of regional, national and student art, and there are sculptures around the campus, including replica Moai statues from Easter Island.

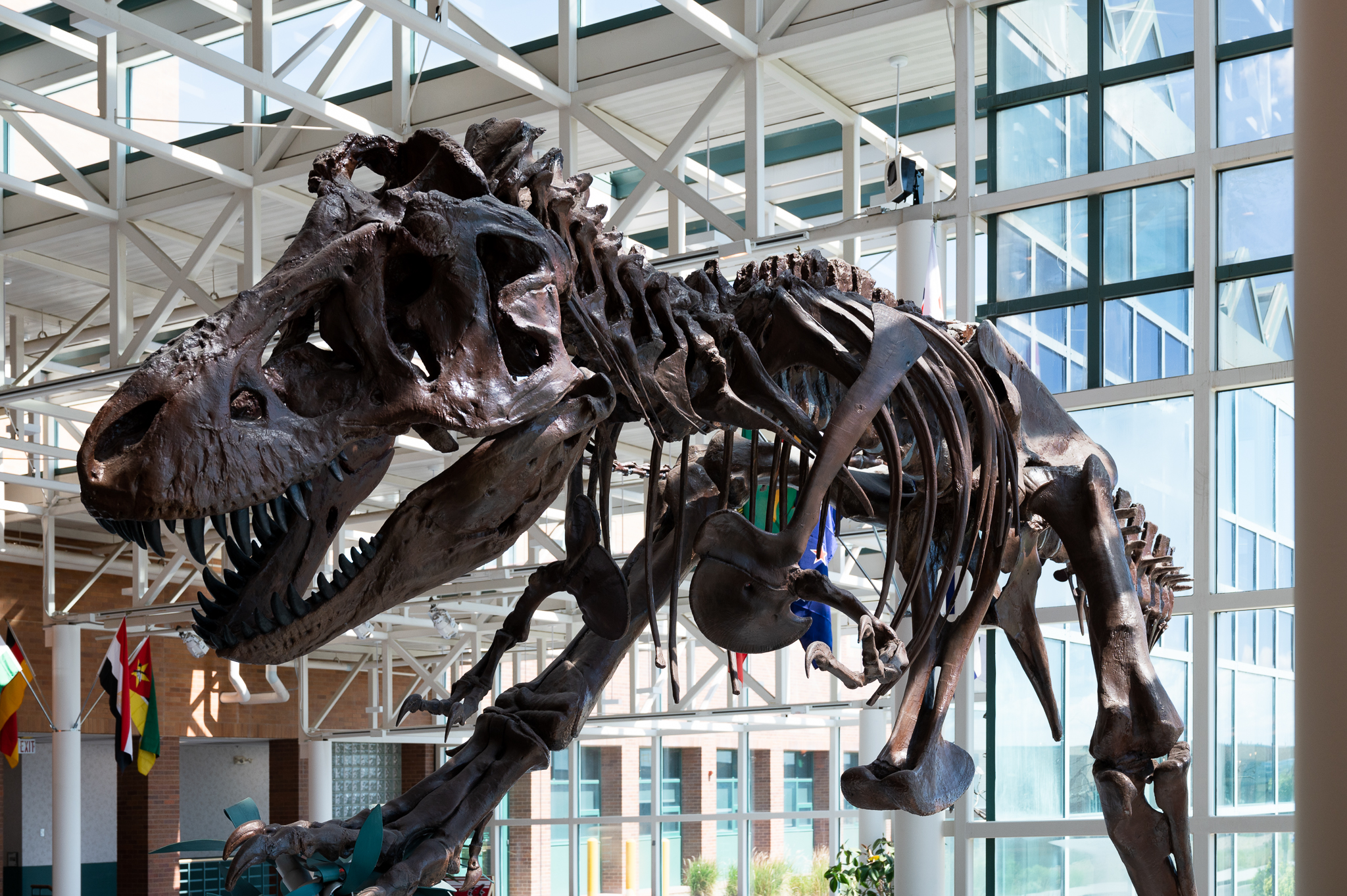
The T-Rex mold inside Western Wyoming College. The T-Rex is one of several dinosaur skeletons on display.
