= Taliaferro House =

Historic house in Wyoming, United States

- U.S. National Register of Historic Places
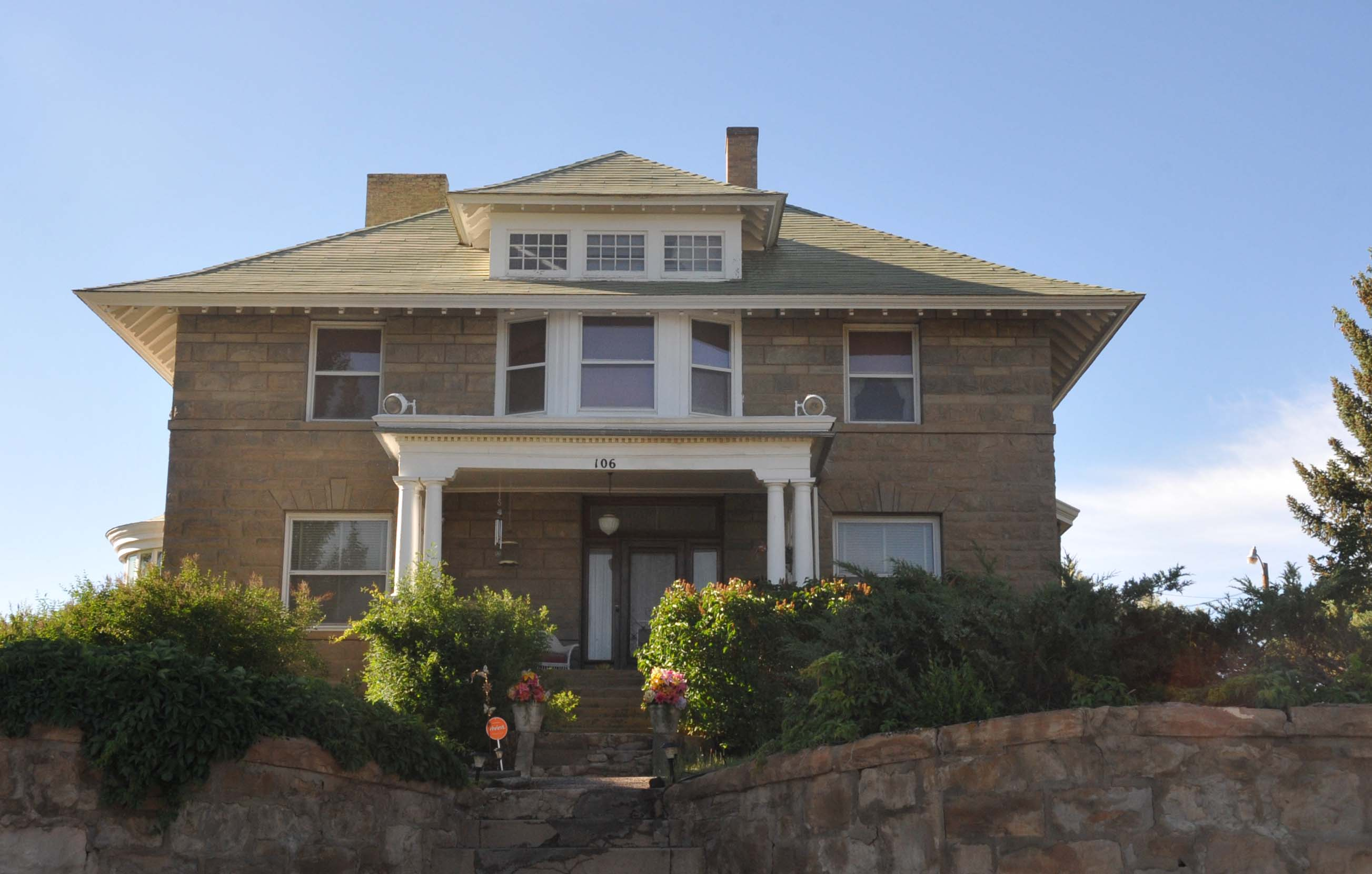

- Location within Wyoming Location within the United States
- Location: 106 Cedar St., Rock Springs, Wyoming
- Coordinates: 41°34′53″N 109°13′7″W
- Area: less than one acre
- Built: c.1907-1912
- Architectural style: Late 19th and 20th Century Revivals
- NRHP reference No.: 98000909
- Added to NRHP: July 23, 1998

The Taliaferro House, at 106 Cedar St. in Rock Springs, Wyoming, was built in c. 1907–1912. It was listed on the National Register of Historic Places on March 31, 1998; the listing included two contributing buildings.
