= Bairoil Town Hall =

- U.S. National Register of Historic Places
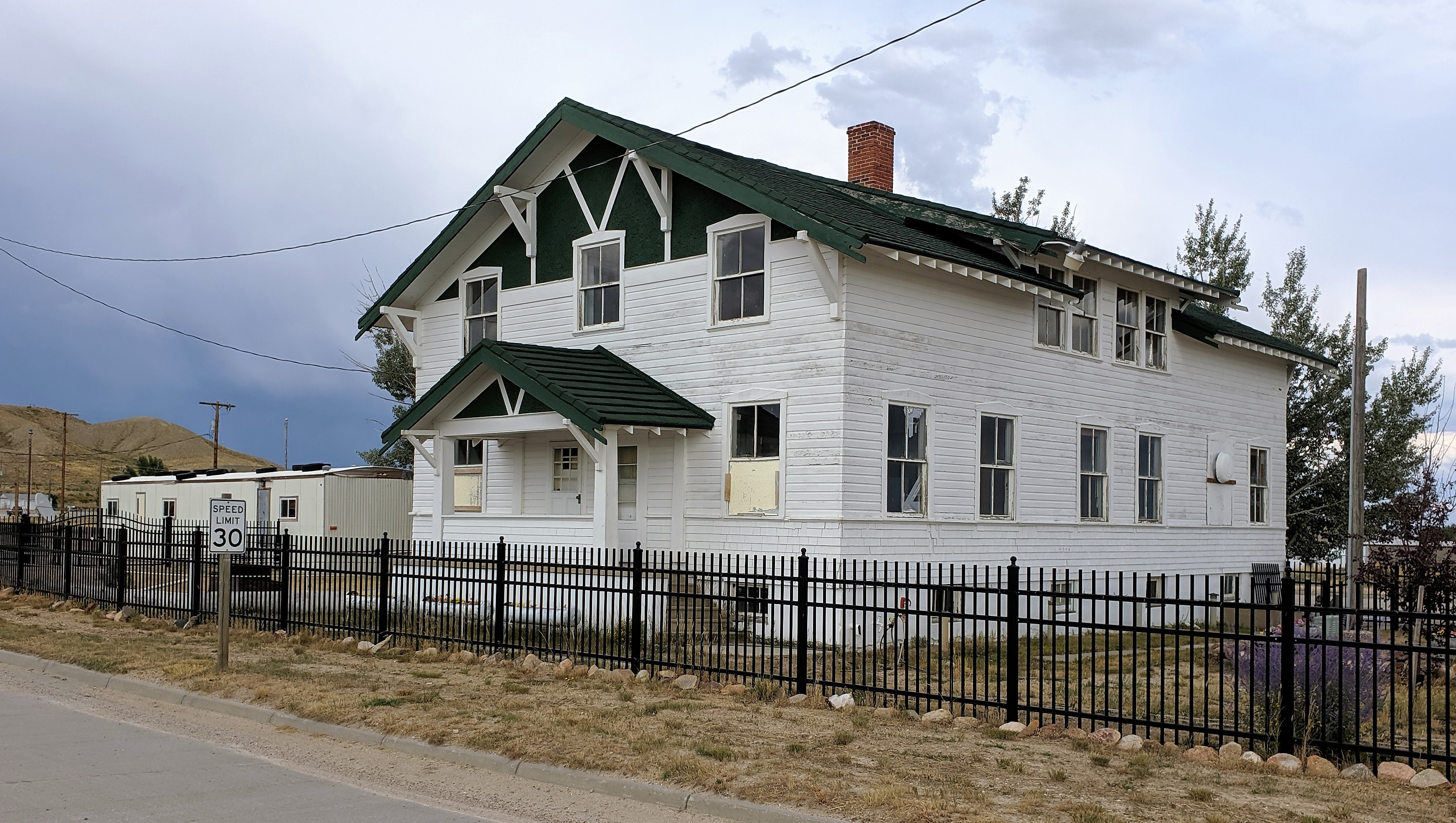

- Location within Wyoming
- Location: 505 Antelope Drive, Bairoil, Wyoming
- Coordinates: 42°14′34″N 107°33′35″W
- NRHP reference No.: 15000858
- Added to NRHP: November 30, 2015

The Bairoil City Hall is the only extant building from the early days of Bairoil, Wyoming that is in its original location. Bairoil was a company town, developed by the Bair Oil Company to serve the surrounding oil fields. The structure served as a dormitory, office building and municipal building before the town was divested in 1978 by Amoco. On Bairoil's incorporation in 1980 the building became the town hall. It was placed on the National Register of Historic Places on November 30, 2015.
