= Eldon-Wall Terrace Site =

- Eldon--Wall Terrace Site (48SW4320)
- U.S. National Register of Historic Places
- Nearest city: Westvaco, Wyoming
- Area: 32 acres (13 ha)
- NRHP reference No.: 85003223
- Added to NRHP: December 13, 1985

The Eldon-Wall Terrace Site is an archeological site in Sweetwater County, Wyoming. The site occupies about 600 metres (2,000 ft) of a terrace on Blacks Fork in the Green River Basin. The site includes numerous hearth sites, with stone chips and tools. A projectile point dates the site to the Middle Archaic period. The site was listed on the National Register of Historic Places on December 13, 1985.
