= Outlaw Inn =

- U.S. National Register of Historic Places
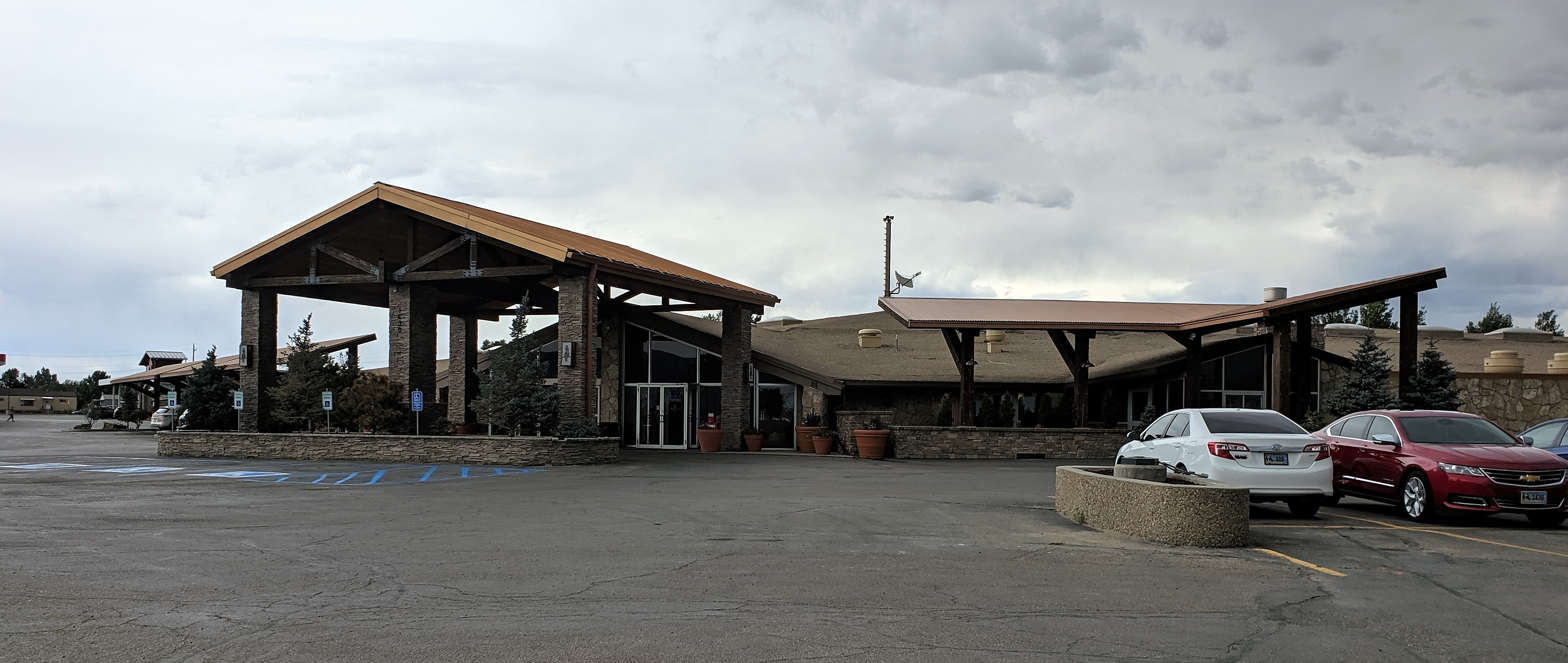

- Location within Wyoming
- Location: 1630 Elk St., Rock Springs, Wyoming
- Coordinates: 41°36′45″N 109°13′50″W
- Built: 1965-66
- NRHP reference No.: 100003142
- Added to NRHP: November 26, 2018

The Outlaw Inn in Rock Springs, Wyoming, at 1630 Elk St., was listed on the National Register of Historic Places in 2018.

Don Anselmi and his brother Jan Anselmi, Mike Vase and Vern Delgado invested $1.5 million to build the hotel. It was opened in 1966. It was built in 1965–66 to be, and remains, a Best Western chain hotel. It has 33 drive-up rooms and 67 courtside rooms.
