= Red Rock (Wyoming) =

- U.S. National Register of Historic Places
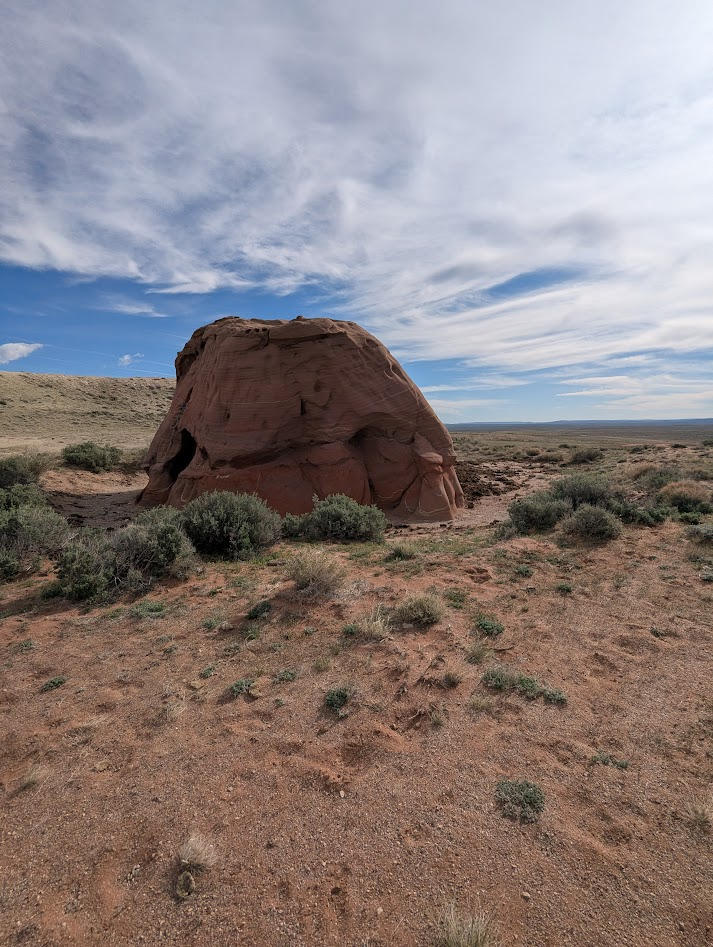
- Red Rock, a landmark used by settlers since the 1850s.

- Location within Wyoming Location within the United States
- Nearest city: Rawlins, Wyoming
- Coordinates: 41°25′46″N 108°0′5″W
- Area: less than one acre
- NRHP reference No.: 78002832
- Added to NRHP: November 21, 1978

Red Rock is a rock formation in south-central Wyoming that was used by travelers on the Overland Trail to record signature inscriptions from passersby. The wind-smoothed red rock stands about 20 feet (6.1 m) high and has a circumference of about 120 feet (37 m). The sandstone formation records signatures dating to at least the 1850s. The signatures on the upwind side of the rock have weathered to faint traces. The rock is on privately owned land.

Red Rock was listed on the National Register of Historic Places on November 21, 1978.
