= Our Lady of Sorrows Catholic Church (Rock Springs, Wyoming) =

Historic church in Wyoming, United States

- U.S. National Register of Historic Places
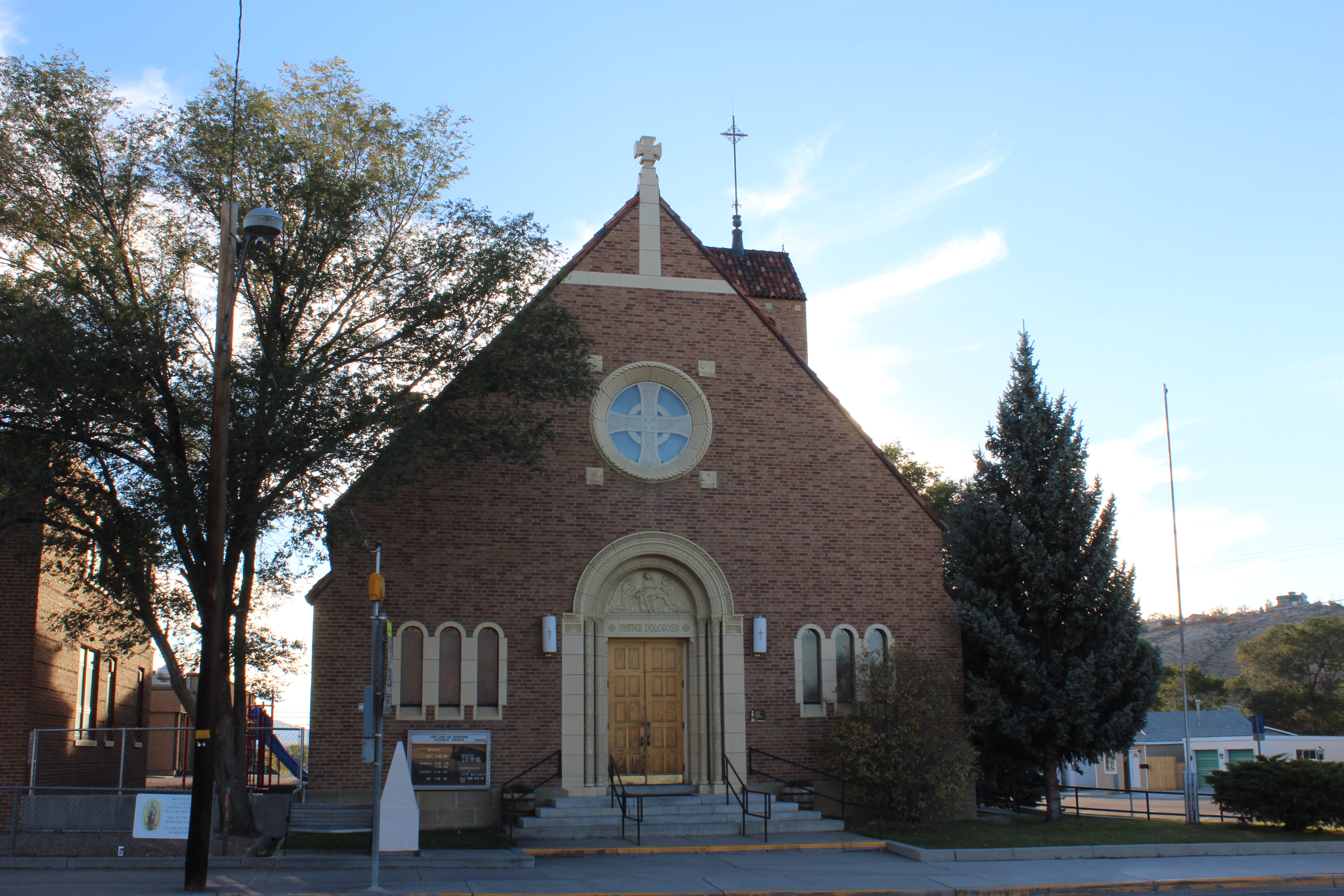

- Location within Wyoming Location within the United States
- Location: A at Broadway, Rock Springs, Wyoming
- Coordinates: 41°34′58″N 109°13′18″W
- Area: less than one acre
- Built: 1932
- Architect: Maginnis and Walsh; Libby, James, et al.
- Architectural style: Romanesque
- NRHP reference No.: 97001326
- Added to NRHP: November 6, 1997

The Our Lady of Sorrows Catholic Church of Rock Springs, Wyoming, on A at Broadway, was built in 1932. It was designed by Boston architects Maginnis and Walsh and its construction was run by supervising architect James Libby. Also known as South Side Catholic Church, it was listed on the National Register of Historic Places in 1997. It was deemed significant for its association with European immigrants to Rock Springs, especially the Irish; the church had a Polish counterpart Catholic parish on the north side of Rock Springs.
