= Eden, Wyoming =

- Census-designated place
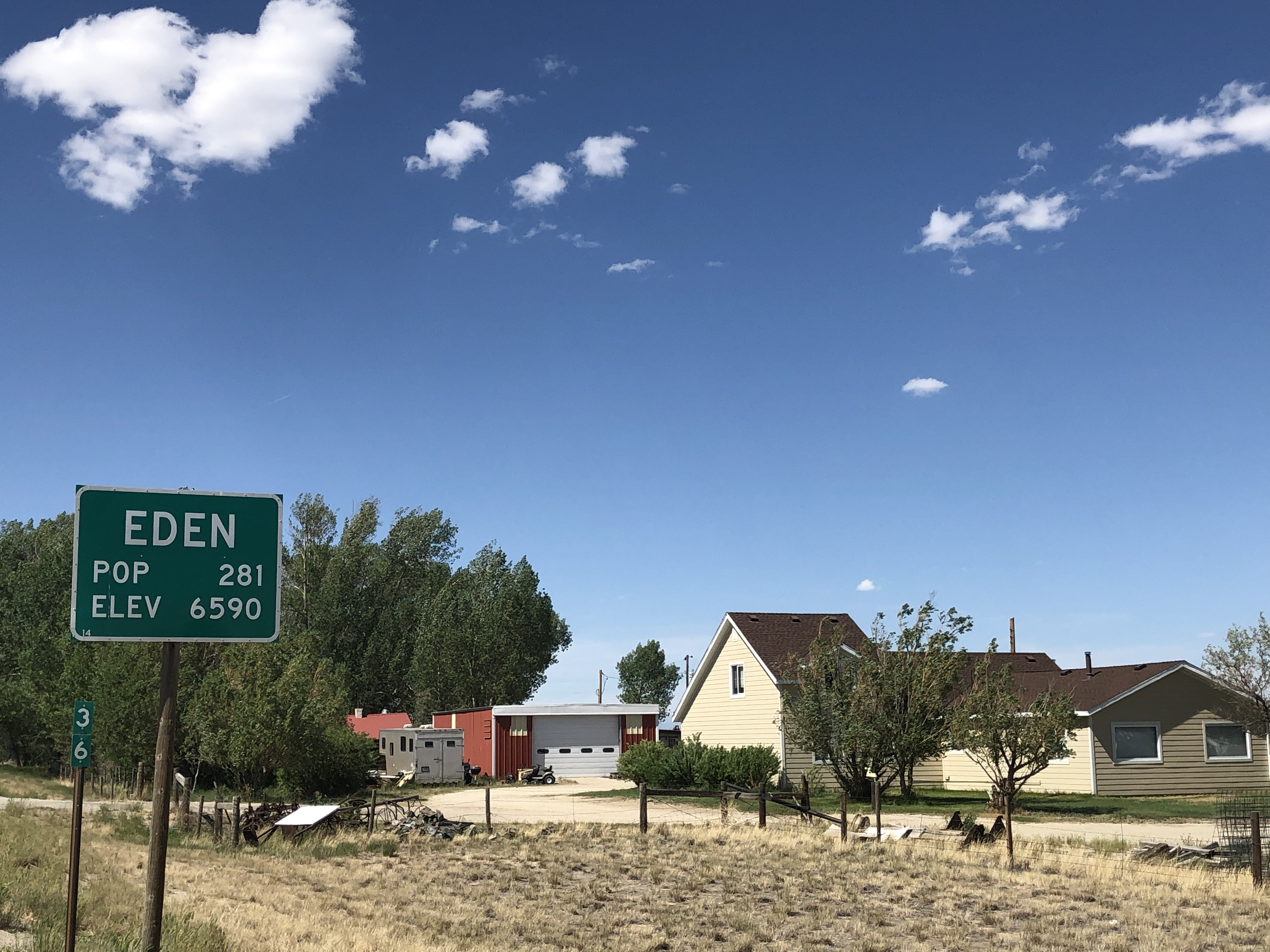
- Border of Eden, Wyoming

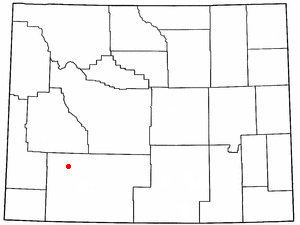
- Location of Eden, Wyoming
- Coordinates: 42°03′37″N 109°26′21″W
- Country: United States
- State: Wyoming
- County: Sweetwater

Area
  - Total: 13.5 sq mi (35 km^{2})
  - Land: 13.5 sq mi (35 km^{2})
  - Water: 0.0 sq mi (0 km^{2})
- Elevation: 6,614 ft (2,016 m)

Population (2010)
  - Total: 281
  - Density: 20.8/sq mi (8.04/km^{2})
- Time zone: UTC-7 (Mountain (MST))
  - Summer (DST): UTC-6 (MDT)
- ZIP code: 82932
- Area code: 307
- FIPS code: 56-23010
- GNIS feature ID: 2408044

Eden is a census-designated place (CDP) in Sweetwater County, Wyoming, United States. The population was 281 at the 2010 census.

== Geography ==
According to the United States Census Bureau, the CDP has a total area of 13.5 square miles (35.0 km^{2}), all land.

== Demographics ==
As of the census of 2000, there were 388 people, 142 households, and 110 families residing in the CDP. The population density was 5.8 people per square mile (2.2/km^{2}). There were 193 housing units at an average density of 2.9/sq mi (1.1/km^{2}). The racial makeup of the CDP was 97.16% White, 1.55% Native American, 0.26% from other races, and 1.03% from two or more races. Hispanic or Latino of any race were 2.84% of the population.

There were 142 households, out of which 35.9% had children under the age of 18 living with them, 69.0% were married couples living together, 6.3% had a female householder with no husband present, and 22.5% were non-families. 18.3% of all households were made up of individuals, and 4.2% had someone living alone who was 65 years of age or older. The average household size was 2.73 and the average family size was 3.06.

In the CDP, the population was spread out, with 27.8% under the age of 18, 8.5% from 18 to 24, 31.4% from 25 to 44, 26.5% from 45 to 64, and 5.7% who were 65 years of age or older. The median age was 37 years. For every 100 females, there were 105.3 males. For every 100 females age 18 and over, there were 110.5 males.

The median income for a household in the CDP was $52,625, and the median income for a family was $55,833. Males had a median income of $46,000 versus $20,250 for females. The per capita income for the CDP was $18,392. About 15.5% of families and 17.6% of the population were below the poverty line, including 29.2% of those under age 18 and none of those age 65 or over.

== Education ==
Public education in the community of Eden is provided by Sweetwater County School District #1. Farson-Eden School, a K-12 campus, serves the community.
