= Reliance, Wyoming =

- Census-designated place
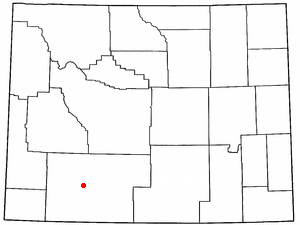
- Location of Reliance, Wyoming
- Coordinates: 41°40′06″N 109°11′52″W
- Country: United States
- State: Wyoming
- County: Sweetwater

Area
  - Total: 4.1 sq mi (11 km^{2})
  - Land: 4.1 sq mi (11 km^{2})
  - Water: 0.0 sq mi (0 km^{2})
- Elevation: 6,529 ft (1,990 m)

Population (2010)
  - Total: 714
  - Density: 170/sq mi (67/km^{2})
- Time zone: UTC-7 (Mountain (MST))
  - Summer (DST): UTC-6 (MDT)
- ZIP code: 82943
- Area code: 307
- FIPS code: 56-65060
- GNIS feature ID: 2409162

Reliance is a census-designated place (CDP) in Sweetwater County, Wyoming, United States. The population was 714 at the 2010 census.

== Geography ==
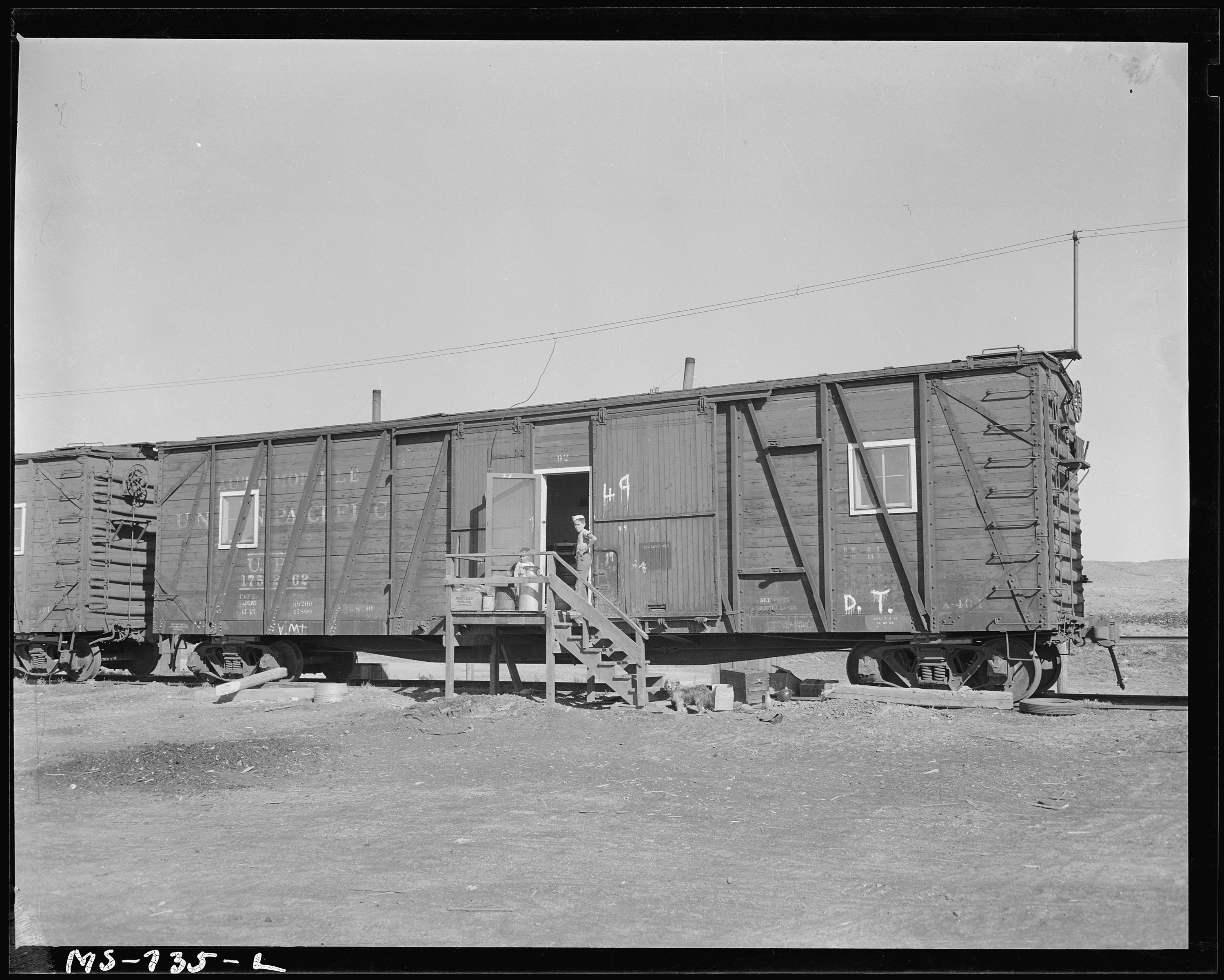
Box car made into home for miner (1946).

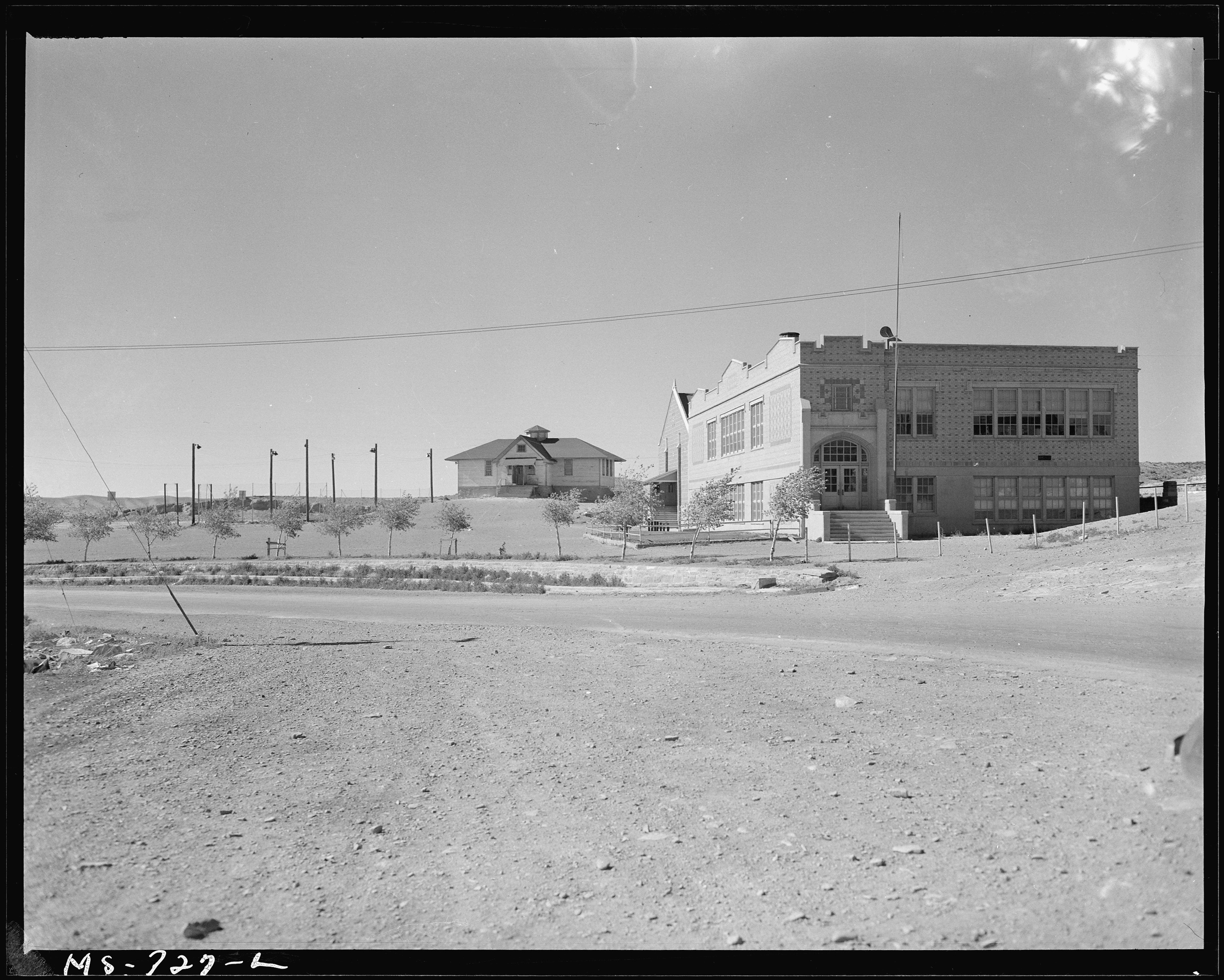
Schoolhouse and playground for miners' children (1946).

According to the United States Census Bureau, the CDP has a total area of 4.1 square miles (10.7 km^{2}), all land.

== Demographics ==
As of the census of 2000, there were 665 people, 249 households, and 182 families residing in the CDP. The population density was 69.8 people per square mile (26.9/km^{2}). There were 272 housing units at an average density of 28.5/sq mi (11.0/km^{2}). The racial makeup of the CDP was 92.33% White, 0.90% African American, 0.45% Native American, 0.30% Asian, 0.15% Pacific Islander, 3.16% from other races, and 2.71% from two or more races. Hispanic or Latino of any race were 7.97% of the population.

There were 249 households, out of which 43.4% had children under the age of 18 living with them, 54.2% were married couples living together, 10.4% had a female householder with no husband present, and 26.9% were non-families. 22.5% of all households were made up of individuals, and 7.6% had someone living alone who was 65 years of age or older. The average household size was 2.67 and the average family size was 3.12.

In the CDP, the population was spread out, with 32.8% under the age of 18, 9.0% from 18 to 24, 29.9% from 25 to 44, 21.1% from 45 to 64, and 7.2% who were 65 years of age or older. The median age was 32 years. For every 100 females, there were 109.1 males. For every 100 females age 18 and over, there were 102.3 males.

The median income for a household in the CDP was $39,688, and the median income for a family was $43,750. Males had a median income of $38,523 versus $12,083 for females. The per capita income for the CDP was $15,222. None of the families and 2.0% of the population were living below the poverty line, including no under eighteens and none of those over 64.

== Education ==
Public education in the community of Reliance is provided by Sweetwater County School District #1.

Reliance has a public library, a branch of the Sweetwater County Library System.
