= Rock Springs, Wyoming =

City in Sweetwater County, Wyoming, US

- City
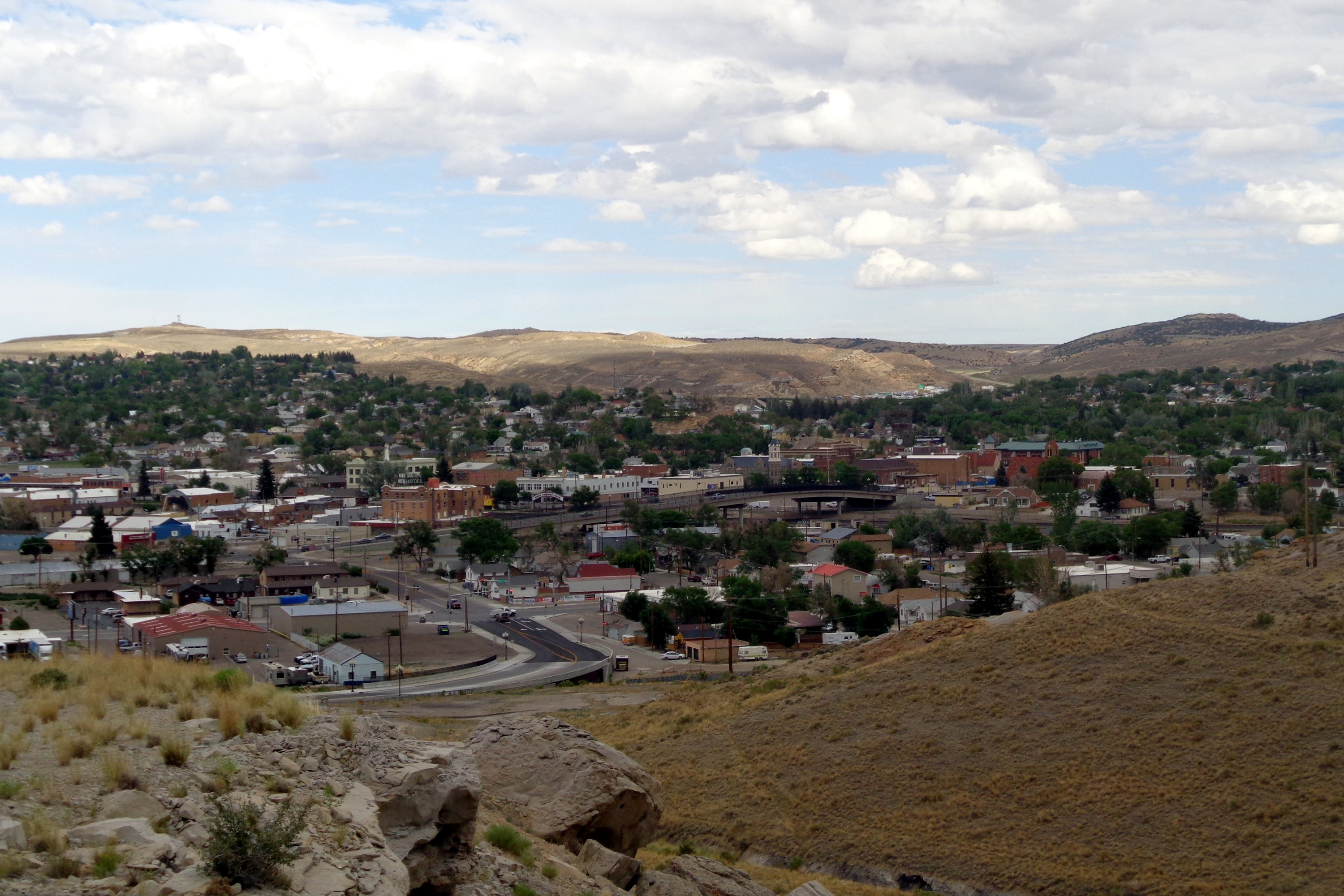
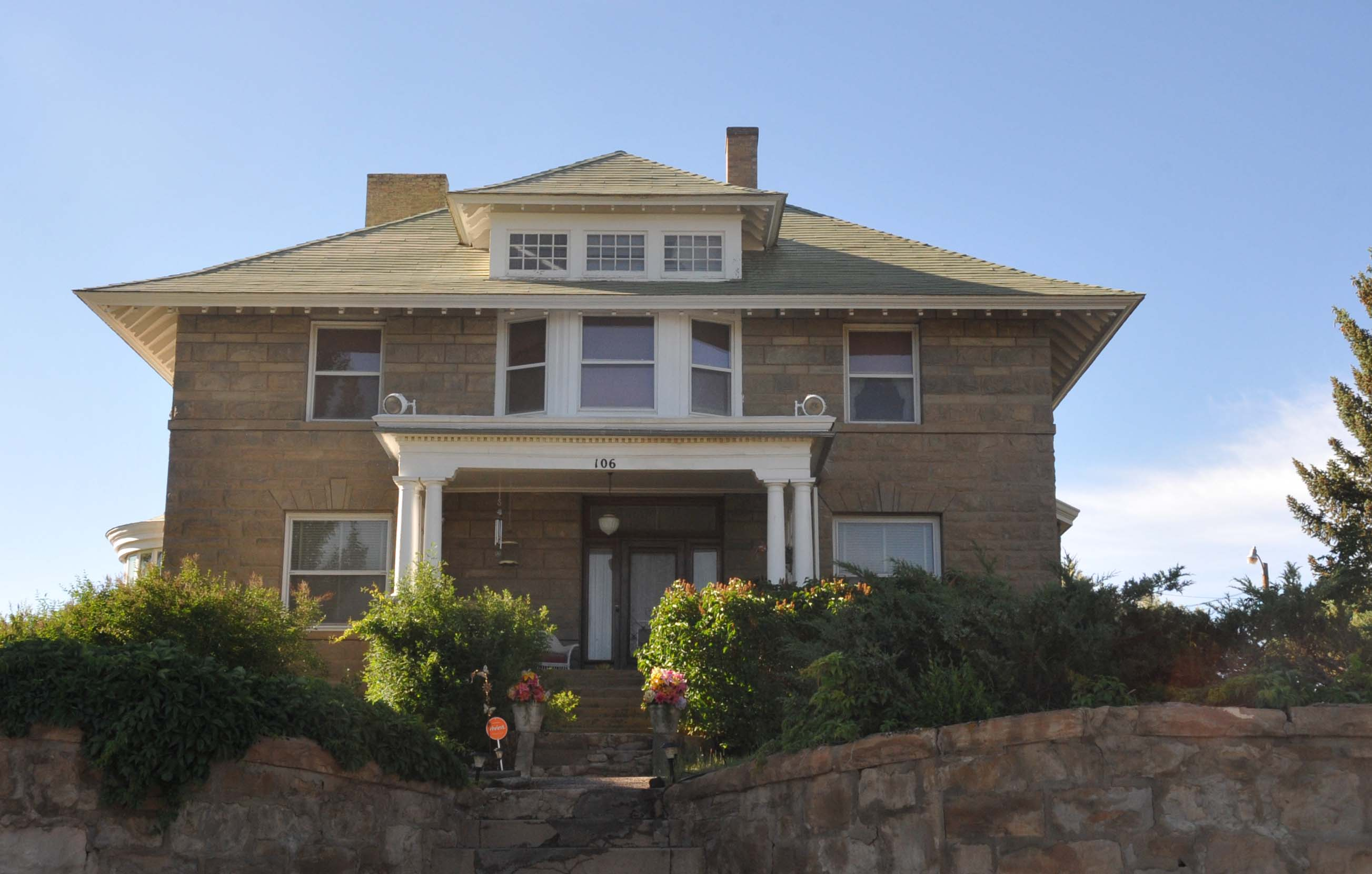
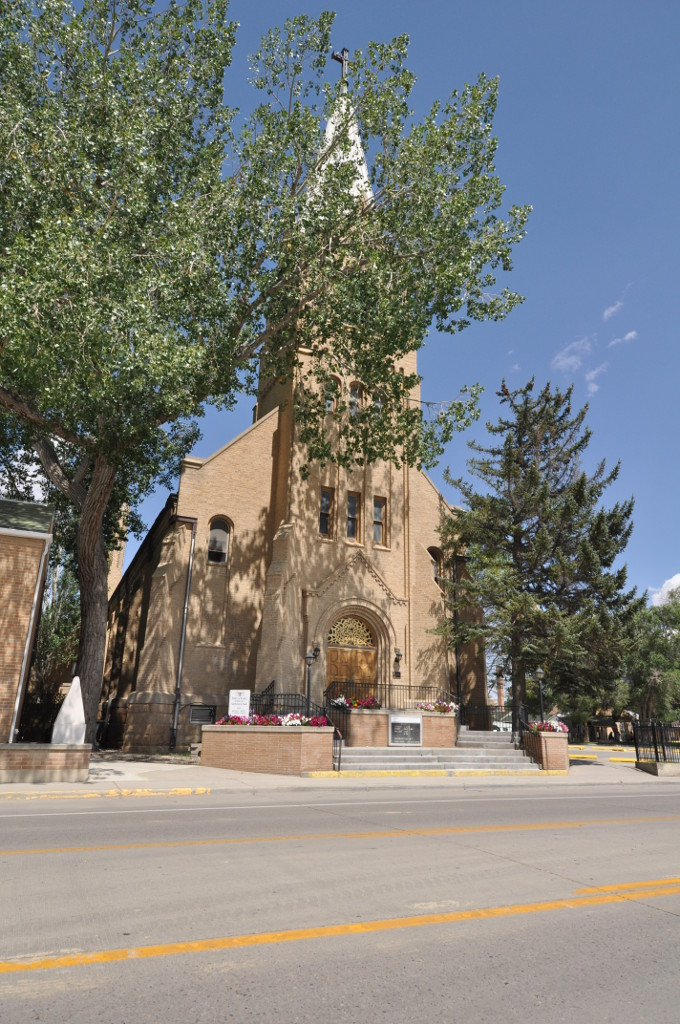
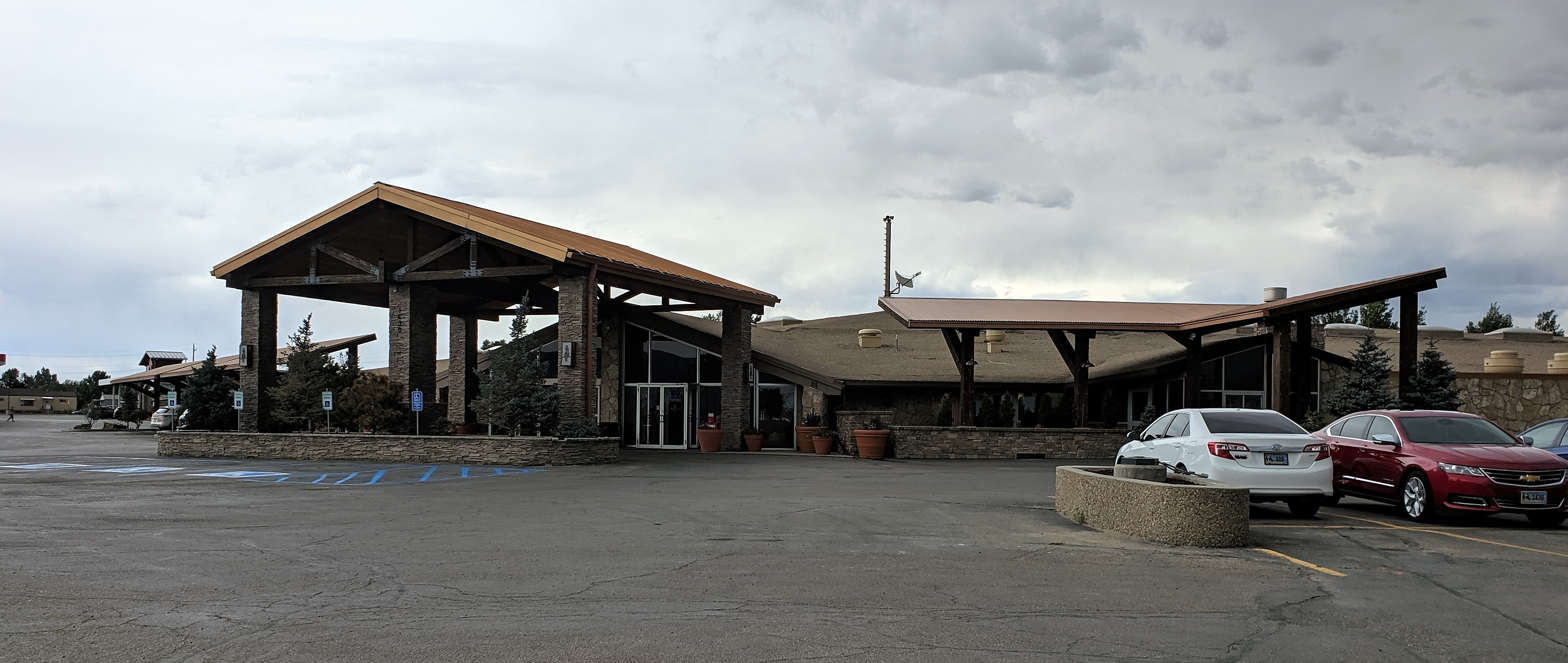
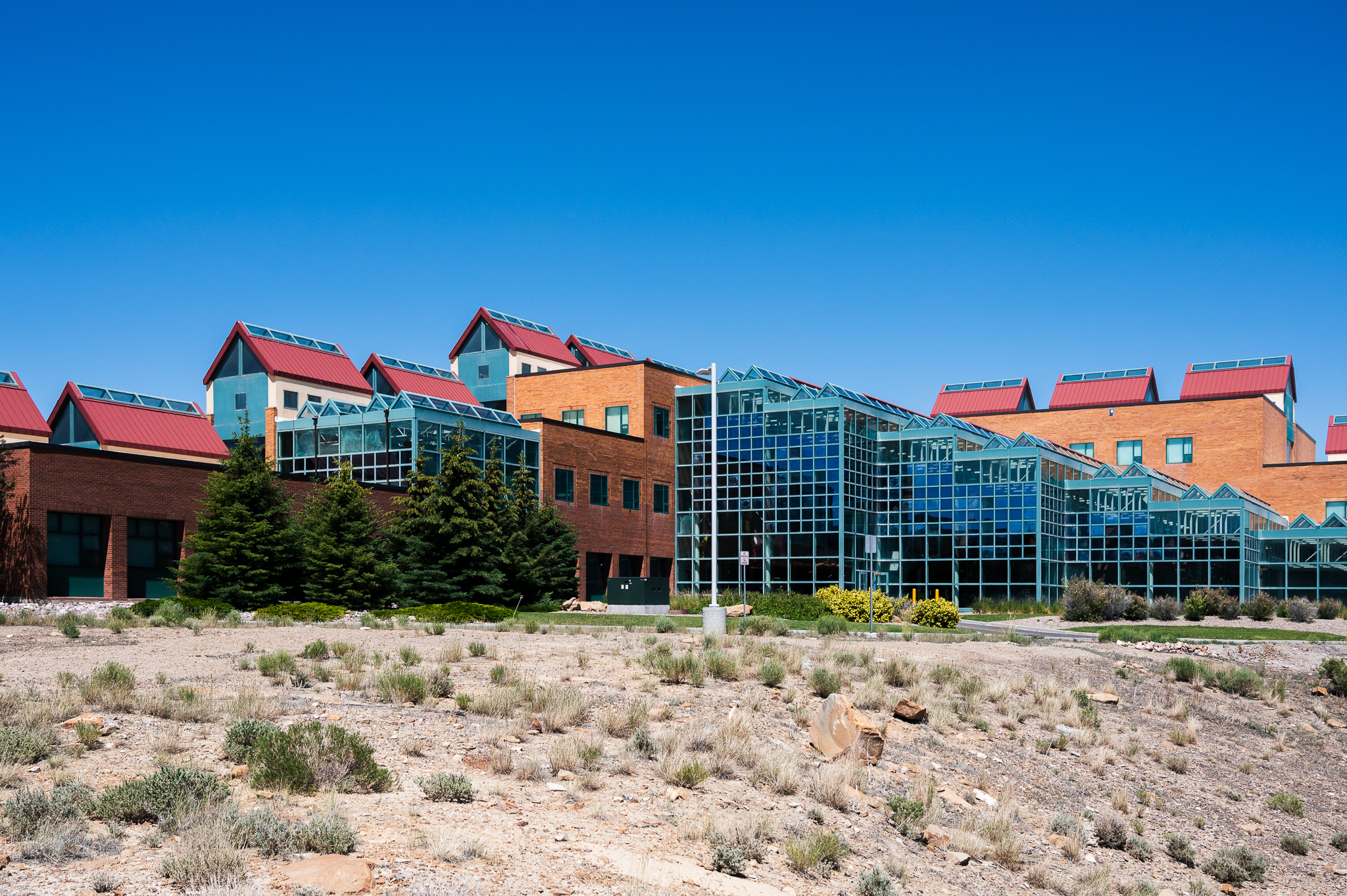
- Panorama of Rock Springs, looking southeast from Grant Street Taliaferro House Saints Cyril and Methodius Church Outlaw Inn Western Wyoming Community College

- Flag

- Location of Rock Springs in Sweetwater County, Wyoming.
- Coordinates: 41°37′27″N 109°13′20″W
- Country: United States
- State: Wyoming
- County: Sweetwater
- Rock Springs: 1888

Area
  - Total: 19.75 sq mi (51.16 km^{2})
  - Land: 19.75 sq mi (51.16 km^{2})
  - Water: 0 sq mi (0.00 km^{2})
- Elevation: 6,388 ft (1,947 m)

Population (2020)
  - Total: 23,526
  - Density: 1,146.8/sq mi (442.78/km^{2})
- Time zone: UTC−7 (Mountain (MST))
  - Summer (DST): UTC−6 (MDT)
- ZIP Codes: 82901, 82902, 82942
- Area code: 307
- FIPS code: 56-67235
- GNIS feature ID: 2410976
- Website: www.rswy.net

Rock Springs is a city in Sweetwater County, Wyoming, United States. The population was 23,526 at the 2020 census, making it the fifth-most populous city in the U.S. state of Wyoming, and the most populous city in Sweetwater County. Rock Springs is the principal city of the Rock Springs micropolitan statistical area, which has a population of 37,975.

Rock Springs is the site of Western Wyoming Community College and Wyoming's Big Show, a yearly event with a carnival and concerts which is held at the Sweetwater County Events Complex. Rock Springs is located in an energy-rich region with many oil and natural gas wells.

== History ==
Rock Springs derives its name from a rock spring which flowed in the Number 6 district in the northern part of town. An account said that the spring was found by a lost Pony Express rider, but the spring station was known to Jim Bridger before 1860; the Overland Stage station was located nearby. The spring disappeared when the coal mine operations interrupted the underground flow.

In the early days, Ed Cleg hauled domestic water from the sulfur spring north of Rock Springs and charged $.25 a barrel. With the mining operations, the water flow was interrupted and water was hauled from Green River and Point of Rocks. Beginning in 1887, a water main was started from the Green River and completed in 1888 to bring a continuous supply of water to Rock Springs.

Rock Springs has a multi-ethnic heritage; locals called it the 57 Variety Town. The first immigrants were brought in by the railroad and coal mining companies. The Welsh and British people were initially most populous. Later, Irish, Black people, and refugees from the Southern part of the United States also came. The Scandinavian people were represented with a heavy Mormon recruitment.

One of the worst incidents of anti-immigrant violence in American history, known as the Rock Springs massacre, occurred on September 2, 1885, when White miners slaughtered their Chinese counterparts due to anti-Chinese sentiment. There are still remains of the old coal mining towns outside of Rock Springs.

On June 10, 1892, Rock Springs National Bank opened on 515 S Main St, across from the Union Pacific depot. The original sandstone building was designed by Mayor H.H. Edgar who chose an Italianate style. In 1907, when John Hay Sr. assumed control of the business, the location moved to C Street. RSNB owned the original building until 1921 when it was sold to Anton Mengoni. Hay Sr. navigated the bank through the Great Depression and World War II, before retiring in 1947. John Hay Jr., his son, then took control of the bank, having to control wild growth during Wyoming's massive energy boom in the 1970s. Another of Hay Sr.'s sons was Archibald (Archie) Hay. Archibald was killed in France by a German plane in 1918. In his memory, Post 24 of the American Legion, chartered in 1919, was named Archie Hay Post.

Rock Springs was featured on 60 Minutes in 1977 due to corruption within the Police Department and City Government. A grand jury was called into session. The Sheriff of Sweetwater County, James Stark, testified and no wrongdoing was ever found. A follow-up was filmed 20 years later for the show City Confidential. The episode was named "Rock Springs: Deadly Draw in the Wild West".

== Geography ==
According to the United States Census Bureau, the city has a total area of 19.34 square miles (50.09 km^{2}), all land.

=== Climate ===
Rock Springs has a semi-arid climate (Köppen BSk) with cold, snowy winters and warm summers. Precipitation is usually light but has two peaks in mid spring and in early fall. Summer and winter are both drier.

The average December temperatures are a maximum of 33.2 °F (0.7 °C) and a minimum of 12.4 °F (−10.9 °C). The average July temperatures are a maximum of 86.3 °F (30.2 °C) and a minimum of 52.5 °F (11.4 °C). There an average of 14.7 days annually with highs of 90 °F (32.2 °C) or higher. There are an average of 183.6 nights with lows of 32 °F (0 °C) or lower and 11.5 nights with lows of 0 °F (−17.8 °C) or lower. The record high temperature was 98 °F (36.7 °C) on July 13, 2002, and the record low temperature was −37 °F (−38.3 °C) on January 12, 1963.

The average annual precipitation is 10.45 inches (265.4 mm). There is an average of 61.7 days with measurable precipitation. The wettest calendar year was 1965 with 14.54 in (369.3 mm) and the driest 2012 with 3.14 in (79.8 mm). The most precipitation in one month was 3.67 in (93.2 mm) in September 1965, July 1973, and May 1995. The most snowfall in one year was 79.7 in (2.02 m) in 1995. The most snowfall in one month was 23.7 in (0.60 m) in February 2001.

Climate data for Rock Springs, Wyoming (Southwest Wyoming Regional Airport), 1991–2020 normals, extremes 1948–present
Month	Jan	Feb	Mar	Apr	May	Jun	Jul	Aug	Sep	Oct	Nov	Dec	Year
Record high °F (°C)	55 (13)	60 (16)	78 (26)	79 (26)	90 (32)	96 (36)	98 (37)	97 (36)	93 (34)	83 (28)	66 (19)	59 (15)	98 (37)
Mean maximum °F (°C)	43.6 (6.4)	47.1 (8.4)	61.1 (16.2)	71.2 (21.8)	79.8 (26.6)	87.9 (31.1)	92.5 (33.6)	90.5 (32.5)	84.4 (29.1)	73.9 (23.3)	58.6 (14.8)	45.9 (7.7)	93.1 (33.9)
Mean daily maximum °F (°C)	34.6 (1.4)	37.9 (3.3)	48.6 (9.2)	56.8 (13.8)	67.3 (19.6)	78.6 (25.9)	86.3 (30.2)	84.4 (29.1)	75.0 (23.9)	61.3 (16.3)	44.7 (7.1)	33.2 (0.7)	59.1 (15.0)
Daily mean °F (°C)	23.5 (−4.7)	26.5 (−3.1)	36.0 (2.2)	43.1 (6.2)	52.3 (11.3)	61.9 (16.6)	69.4 (20.8)	67.6 (19.8)	58.1 (14.5)	46.3 (7.9)	32.7 (0.4)	22.8 (−5.1)	45.0 (7.2)
Mean daily minimum °F (°C)	12.4 (−10.9)	15.1 (−9.4)	23.4 (−4.8)	29.5 (−1.4)	37.4 (3.0)	45.2 (7.3)	52.5 (11.4)	50.7 (10.4)	41.2 (5.1)	31.4 (−0.3)	20.7 (−6.3)	12.4 (−10.9)	31.0 (−0.6)
Mean minimum °F (°C)	−7.9 (−22.2)	−5.4 (−20.8)	7.3 (−13.7)	16.0 (−8.9)	25.5 (−3.6)	34.3 (1.3)	45.5 (7.5)	42.8 (6.0)	29.6 (−1.3)	15.9 (−8.9)	2.7 (−16.3)	−6.6 (−21.4)	−14.3 (−25.7)
Record low °F (°C)	−37 (−38)	−29 (−34)	−12 (−24)	2 (−17)	14 (−10)	26 (−3)	35 (2)	33 (1)	5 (−15)	−10 (−23)	−13 (−25)	−29 (−34)	−37 (−38)
Average precipitation inches (mm)	0.45 (11)	0.43 (11)	0.61 (15)	1.07 (27)	1.88 (48)	0.82 (21)	0.92 (23)	0.89 (23)	1.17 (30)	1.03 (26)	0.66 (17)	0.52 (13)	10.45 (265)
Average snowfall inches (cm)	6.1 (15)	5.8 (15)	4.4 (11)	1.9 (4.8)	0.5 (1.3)	0.0 (0.0)	0.0 (0.0)	0.0 (0.0)	0.0 (0.0)	2.3 (5.8)	3.8 (9.7)	6.5 (17)	31.3 (79.6)
Average precipitation days (≥ 0.01 in)	4.4	4.7	4.2	5.6	8.8	4.8	4.1	4.8	5.5	5.0	4.0	5.8	61.7
Average snowy days (≥ 0.1 in)	3.7	3.5	2.5	0.6	0.3	0.0	0.0	0.0	0.0	0.7	2.5	5.0	18.8
Source 1: NOAA
Source 2: National Weather Service

== Demographics ==
Historical population
Census	Pop.	Note	%±
1870	40		—
1880	763		1,807.5%
1890	3,406		346.4%
1900	4,363		28.1%
1910	5,778		32.4%
1920	6,456		11.7%
1930	8,440		30.7%
1940	9,827		16.4%
1950	10,857		10.5%
1960	10,371		−4.5%
1970	11,657		12.4%
1980	19,458		66.9%
1990	19,050		−2.1%
2000	18,708		−1.8%
2010	23,036		23.1%
2020	23,526		2.1%

=== 2020 census ===
As of the 2020 census, Rock Springs had a population of 23,526. The median age was 34.7 years. 26.7% of residents were under the age of 18 and 12.0% of residents were 65 years of age or older. For every 100 females there were 104.9 males, and for every 100 females age 18 and over there were 103.8 males age 18 and over.

98.6% of residents lived in urban areas, while 1.4% lived in rural areas.

There were 9,316 households in Rock Springs, of which 34.3% had children under the age of 18 living in them. Of all households, 47.3% were married-couple households, 22.3% were households with a male householder and no spouse or partner present, and 21.6% were households with a female householder and no spouse or partner present. About 29.2% of all households were made up of individuals and 8.9% had someone living alone who was 65 years of age or older.

There were 10,797 housing units, of which 13.7% were vacant. The homeowner vacancy rate was 2.9% and the rental vacancy rate was 21.3%.

Racial composition as of the 2020 census
Race	Number	Percent
White	18,865	80.2%
Black or African American	270	1.1%
American Indian and Alaska Native	243	1.0%
Asian	211	0.9%
Native Hawaiian and Other Pacific Islander	42	0.2%
Some other race	1,533	6.5%
Two or more races	2,362	10.0%
Hispanic or Latino (of any race)	4,185	17.8%

=== 2010 census ===
At the 2010 census, there were 23,036 people, 8,762 households and 5,849 families living in the city. The population density was 1,191.1 inhabitants per square mile (459.9/km^{2}). There were 10,070 housing units at an average density of 520.7 per square mile (201.0/km^{2}). The racial makeup of the city was 86.4% White, 1.4% African American, 0.8% Native American, 1.1% Asian, 0.1% Pacific Islander, 7.5% from other races, and 2.6% from two or more races. Hispanic or Latino of any race were 16.4% of the population.

There were 8,762 households, of which 35.8% had children under the age of 18 living with them, 49.9% were married couples living together, 9.8% had a female householder with no husband present, 7.1% had a male householder with no wife present, and 33.2% were non-families. 25.3% of all households were made up of individuals, and 6.6% had someone living alone who was 65 years of age or older. The average household size was 2.57 and the average family size was 3.07.

The median age in the city was 31.5 years. 26.4% of residents were under the age of 18; 11.4% were between the ages of 18 and 24; 29.4% were from 25 to 44; 24.6% were from 45 to 64; and 8.1% were 65 years of age or older. The gender makeup of the city was 52.1% male and 47.9% female.

=== 2000 census ===
At the 2000 census], there were 18,708 people, 7,348 households and 4,930 families living in the city. The population density was 1,014.4 per square mile (391.7/km^{2}). There were 8,359 housing units at an average density of 453.3 per square mile (175.0/km^{2}). The racial makeup of the city was 91.75% White, 1.07% African American, 0.86% Native American, 1.02% Asian, 0.03% Pacific Islander, 3.05% from other races, and 2.22% from two or more races. Hispanic or Latino of any race were 8.96% of the population.

There were 7,348 households, of which 35.4% had children under the age of 18 living with them, 52.5% were married couples living together, 10.2% had a female householder with no husband present, and 32.9% were non-families. 27.4% of all households were made up of individuals, and 8.5% had someone living alone who was 65 years of age or older. The average household size was 2.48 and the average family size was 3.02.

27.1% of the population were under the age of 18, 11.2% from 18 to 24, 29.2% from 25 to 44, 22.5% from 45 to 64, and 9.9% who were 65 years of age or older. The median age was 34 years. For every 100 females, there were 99.2 males. For every 100 females age 18 and over, there were 98.2 males.

The median household income was $42,584 and the median family income was $51,541. Males had a median income of $44,809 compared with $22,609 for females. The per capita income for the city was $19,396. About 6.4% of families and 9.4% of the population were below the poverty line, including 11.0% of those under age 18 and 8.7% of those age 65 or over.

== Arts and culture ==
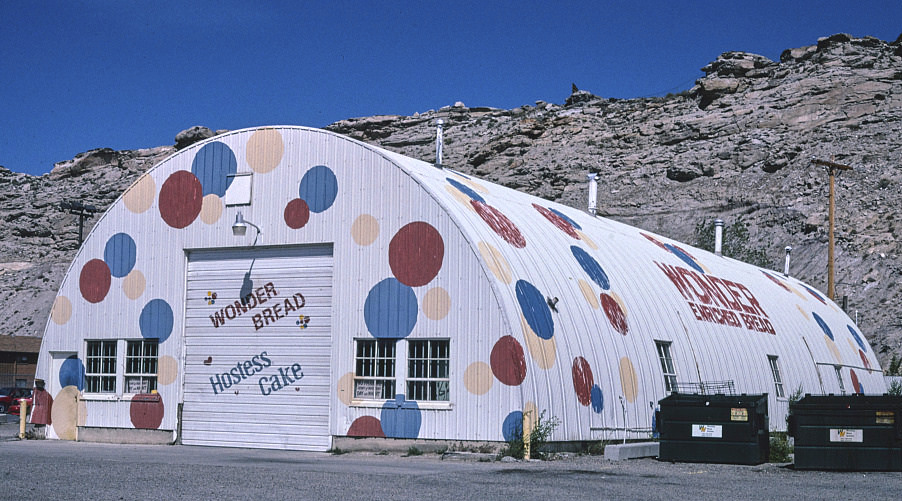
Wonder Bread store in Rock Springs, 2004

Rock Springs hosts the International Festival, the Blues and Brews Festival, the Wyoming Chocolate Festival and the Rod and Rails Festival. In July, August, and September, the city holds a county fair called Wyoming's Big Show.

Rock Springs has two public libraries, Rock Springs Library and White Mountain Library, both of which are branches of the Sweetwater County Library System. The Rock Springs Library is also an original Carnegie Library, and has since been expanded to include the Community Fine Arts Center, home to a permeant collection of original work by artists Norman Rockwell, Grandma Moses, Paul Horiuchi, Loren McGiver, Elliott Orr, Edward Chavez, Ilya Bolotowsky, Raphael Soyer, and Rufino Tamayo.

== Education ==
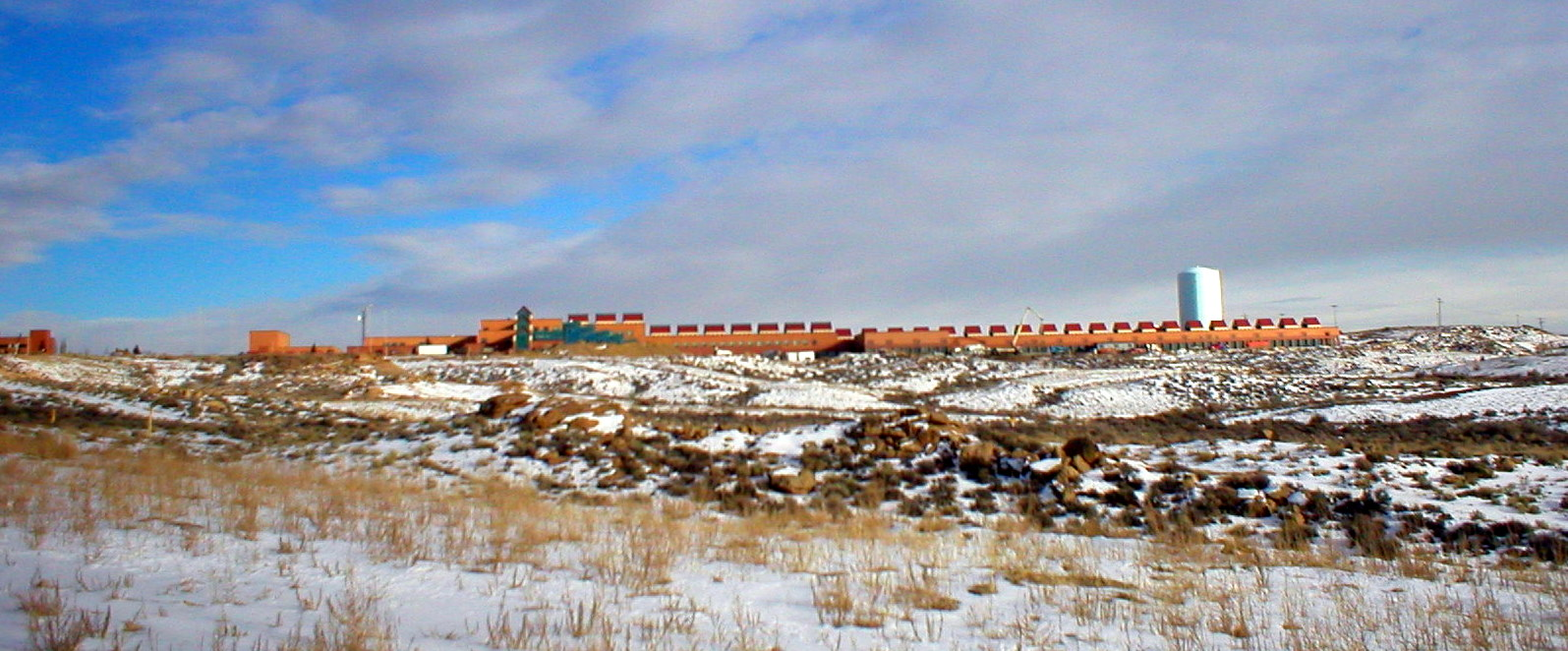
Western Wyoming Community College, December 2007

Public education in the city of Rock Springs is provided by Sweetwater County School District #1. Schools serving the city include: Desert View Elementary, Northpark Elementary, Overland Elementary, Pilot Butte Elementary, Sage Elementary, Stagecoach Elementary, Walnut Elementary, Westridge Elementary, Eastside Elementary, Rock Springs Junior High School, and Rock Springs High School. There are also two alternative campuses – Black Butte High School, and Roosevelt Learning Center.

Western Wyoming College is a community college in Rock Springs.

== Media ==
=== Hyperlocal websites ===
Rock Springs is served by two hyperlocal news websites, SweetwaterNOW.com and Wyo4news.com

=== Print ===
Rock Springs is served by two print publications: Rock Springs Daily Rocket-Miner and the Green River Star (a weekly newspaper published in Green River).

=== Radio ===
Rock Springs is served by a number of radio stations including KRKK, KSIT, KQSW, KMRZ-FM, KYCS, KZWB, KFRZ and KUGR.

=== Television ===
All television stations in Rock Springs are translators or satellites of stations located elsewhere:

Channel	Callsign	Network	Notes
13	KGWR-TV	CBS/ABC	Satellite of KGWC-TV, Casper, Wyoming
28	K28JU-D	PBS	relay of Wyoming PBS

== Infrastructure ==
=== Transportation ===
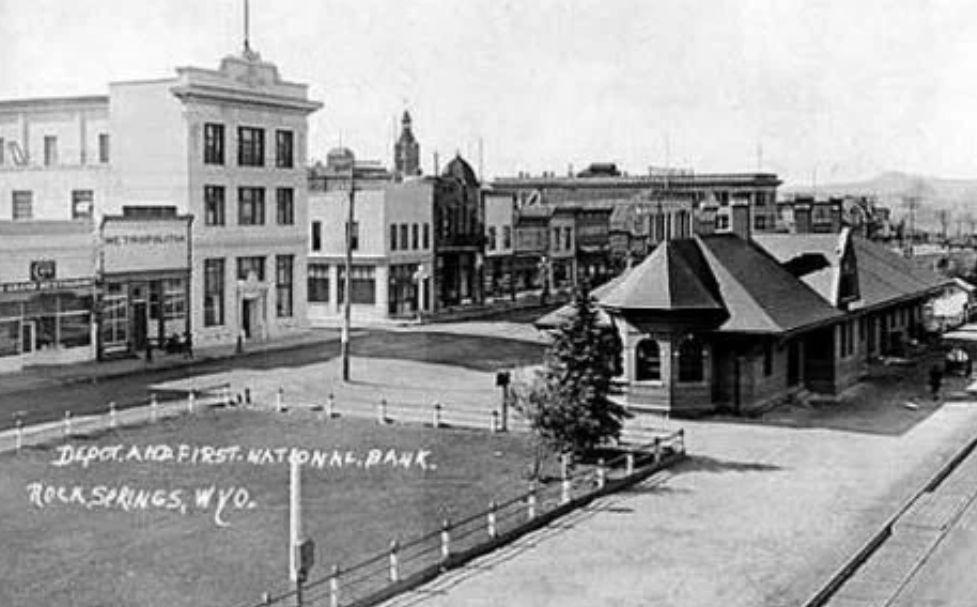
Front Street, downtown Rock Springs and the train depot in 1919

==== Highways ====
- I-80
- US 30 (Dewar Drive)
- US 191
- WYO 370 (Baxter Road/Airport Road)
- WYO 376 (Circumferential Highway/Rock Springs Beltway)
- WYO 430 (Hampshire Street Parkway)

==== Airports ====
Rock Springs is served by Southwest Wyoming Regional Airport.

==== Public transportation ====
STAR Transit provides local bus service in Rock Springs, with limited service to Reliance and Green River.

==== Railroads ====
Union Pacific freight serves Rock Springs. Passenger service ended in 1997.

== Notable people ==
- Adam Archuleta, football player
- Joseph M. Barbuto, politician
- Earl W. Bascom, rodeo champion, cowboy artist, Rodeo Hall of Fame cowboy, Hollywood actor, inventor
- Texas Rose Bascom, rodeo performer, trick roper, Hollywood actress, National Cowgirl Hall of Fame inductee
- Paul Brothers, football player
- Ed Cantrell, Public Safety Director accused but acquitted of shooting an undercover officer from the Rock Springs Police Department
- Butch Cassidy, butcher and outlaw
- Bruce Collins, pro basketball player
- Edward Crippa, politician
- Mickey Daniels, actor
- Boyd Dowler, football player
- John Frullo, politician
- Paul Gosar, politician
- Pete Gosar, brother of Paul Gosar and politician
- Robert Holding, launched first of Grand America Hotels & Resorts
- Kathy Karpan, Wyoming Secretary of State and Director of the Office of Surface Mining Reclamation and Enforcement
- Joe Legerski, head coach of Wyoming Cowgirls basketball team
- Andrew Manatos, administrative assistant for US Senate liaison to presidents John F. Kennedy and Lyndon B. Johnson
- Florabel Muir, syndicated columnist, New York newspaper reporter and Hollywood screenwriter
- Todd Parr, author, illustrator, animator and television producer
- Teno Roncalio, politician
- Jack Snow, football player
- J.J. Syvrud, football player
- John Wendling, football player
- Spencer West, motivational speaker and disability advocate
- Kenilynn S. Zanetti, politician
