= Rawlins station =

Defunct railway station in Rawlins, Wyoming

Rawlins, WY
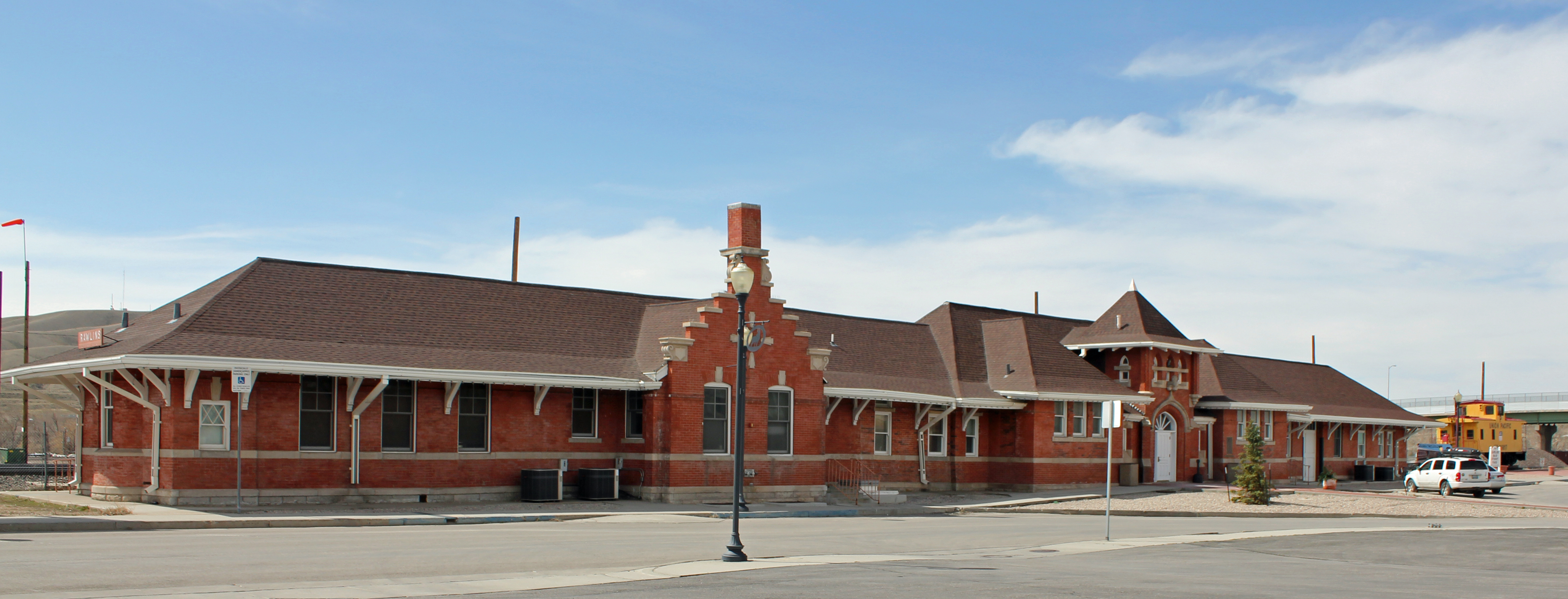
- The former Union Pacific Railroad Depot at Rawlins in 2014

General information
- Location: North Front Street at Fourth Street; Rawlins, Wyoming
- Line: Union Pacific Railroad

History
- Opened: 1901; June 17, 1991
- Closed: July 16, 1983; May 10, 1997

Former services
Preceding station	Amtrak	Following station
Rock Springs toward Seattle	Pioneer 1991–1997	Laramie toward Chicago
Rock Springs toward Oakland-16th Street	San Francisco Zephyr 1972–1983	Laramie toward Chicago
Rock Springs toward Oakland-16th Street	City of San Francisco 1971–1972	Laramie toward Chicago
Preceding station	Union Pacific Railroad	Following station
Creston toward Ogden	Overland Route	Sinclair toward Council Bluffs Transfer
- Union Pacific Railroad Depot
- U.S. National Register of Historic Places
- Coordinates: 41°47′13″N 107°14′18″W
- Area: less than one acre
- Architectural style: Romanesque
- NRHP reference No.: 93000883
- Added to NRHP: September 2, 1993
Location

Rawlins station is a former train station in Rawlins, Wyoming. It was served by the Union Pacific Railroad from its 1901 construction to 1971, and Amtrak from 1971–1983 and 1991–1997. It was added to the National Register of Historic Places in 1993, as the Union Pacific Railroad Depot.

== History ==
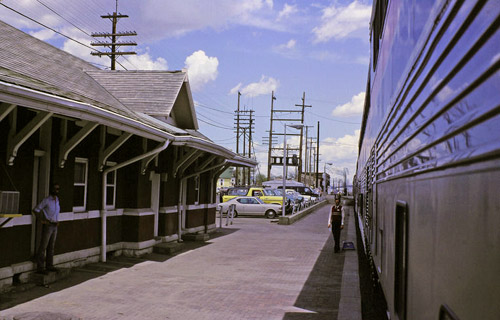
The San Francisco Zephyr at Rawlins in June 1983, shortly before it was rerouted as the California Zephyr

The station was built in 1901 to a design by the Union Pacific's engineering department. The one-story brick structure is a typical railroad depot, with a rectangular plan paralleling the railroad tracks, a hipped roof and a projecting bay affording a view up and down the line. The Rawlins depot is larger than most, with brick in lieu of frame construction, and extra detailing in the form of projecting hipped bays, an entrance tower and stepped gables. It measures 132 feet (40 m) by 28 feet (8.5 m) with deep bracketed overhangs under the flared hipped roof. The depot's interior housed separate men's and women's waiting rooms, toilets, a lobby and a ticket desk along with a telegraph office and a freight office. The public spaces were entered under a low tower structure. A neighboring 1916 structure called the Eating House housed a dining room and kitchen, connected to the main building by an arcade. After a fire in the 1920s the Eating House was converted to offices. The interior of the main depot was remodeled in the 1940s and was stripped of much of its woodwork.

Amtrak took over intercity service on May 1, 1971, with its City of San Francisco running until June 1972, when it was replaced by the San Francisco Zephyr. The California Zephyr replaced the San Francisco on a more southern route on July 16, 1983, ending passenger rail service to Rawlins. The interior was subsequently converted entirely to office use.

Amtrak service was restored with the rerouting of the Pioneer via Rawlins on June 17, 1991. In the 1990s the depot was given by the Union Pacific Railroad to the city of Rawlins. It is used as a community center. The depot was placed on the National Register of Historic Places on September 2, 1993. Amtrak service ended for a second time on May 10, 1997, when the Pioneer was discontinued.
