= Borie station =

Train station that served Cheyenne, WY, USA

Borie, WY
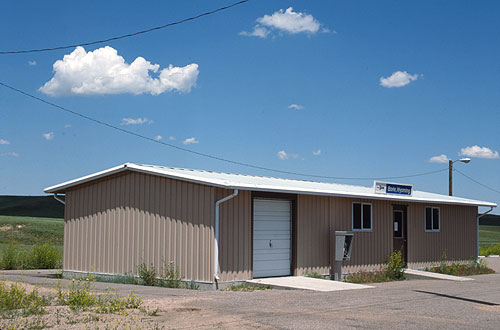
- The station building in 1983

General information
- Location: Otto Road Borie, Wyoming 82007
- Coordinates: 41°05′26.27″N 104°59′20.36″W
- Line: Union Pacific Railroad

History
- Opened: October 28, 1979; June 17, 1991
- Closed: July 16, 1983; May 10, 1997

Former services
Preceding station	Amtrak	Following station
Laramie toward Seattle	Pioneer 1991–1997	Greeley toward Chicago
Laramie toward Oakland-16th Street	San Francisco Zephyr 1979–1983	Greeley toward Chicago
Location

Borie was the primary Amtrak train station serving Cheyenne, Wyoming, following the 1979 closure of Cheyenne Depot. The station was located 10 miles (16 km) west of Cheyenne in the small locality of Borie, Wyoming, with a shuttle bus connecting riders to the city.

Borie station was served by the Chicago–Oakland San Francisco Zephyr from 1979 to 1983, and again by the Chicago–Seattle Pioneer from 1991 until the train's discontinuation in 1997, when the facility was permanently closed.

== Description ==
The station at Borie was built to serve as the Cheyenne-area stop for the San Francisco Zephyr in lieu of the Cheyenne Depot's closure after 1979. The design of the station house was very similar to other stations that followed the minimal "Amshack" aesthetics. The station was built outside of a siding in the small locality of Borie, Wyoming, west of Cheyenne. This eliminated a time-consuming backup move in and out of the Cheyenne station, but forced riders to utilize a shuttle bus to reach the city 10 miles (16 km) away from the station.

Service at the station began in 1979 but was short lived, with the rerouting and renaming of the San Francisco Zephyr in 1983. Service restarted when the Pioneer was rerouted from Denver, Colorado to Ogden, Utah in 1991, though the station building had been rebuilt to an even smaller design. The station continued to be used until the Pioneer ceased running in 1997, officially ending service at the station. By 2011 the station building had been demolished and the platforms and siding had been removed, though the station site has remained. Although Front Range Passenger Rail is planning to reinstate service to Cheyenne, it is expected to use the former Cheyenne Depot without a stop at Borie.

== See also ==
- Evanston Depot
- Laramie Railroad Depot
