= Cheyenne Depot Museum =

Railroad museum in Cheyenne, Wyoming, US

Cheyenne, WY
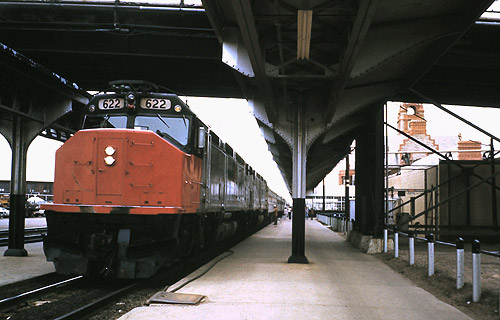
- The San Francisco Zephyr at Cheyenne in April 1976.

General information
- Location: 121 West 15th Street, Cheyenne, Wyoming 82001
- Line: Union Pacific Railroad

History
- Closed: October 28, 1979

Former services
Preceding station	Amtrak	Following station
Laramie toward Oakland-16th Street	San Francisco Zephyr 1972–1979	Greeley toward Chicago
Laramie toward Oakland-16th Street	City of San Francisco 1971–1972	Greeley toward Chicago
Preceding station	Union Pacific Railroad	Following station
Borie toward Ogden	Overland Route	Hillside toward Council Bluffs Transfer
through to Ogden via Overland Route	Cheyenne – Denver	Speer toward Denver
- Union Pacific Railroad Depot; Union Pacific Roundhouse, Turntable and Machine Shop
- U.S. National Register of Historic Places
- U.S. National Historic Landmark
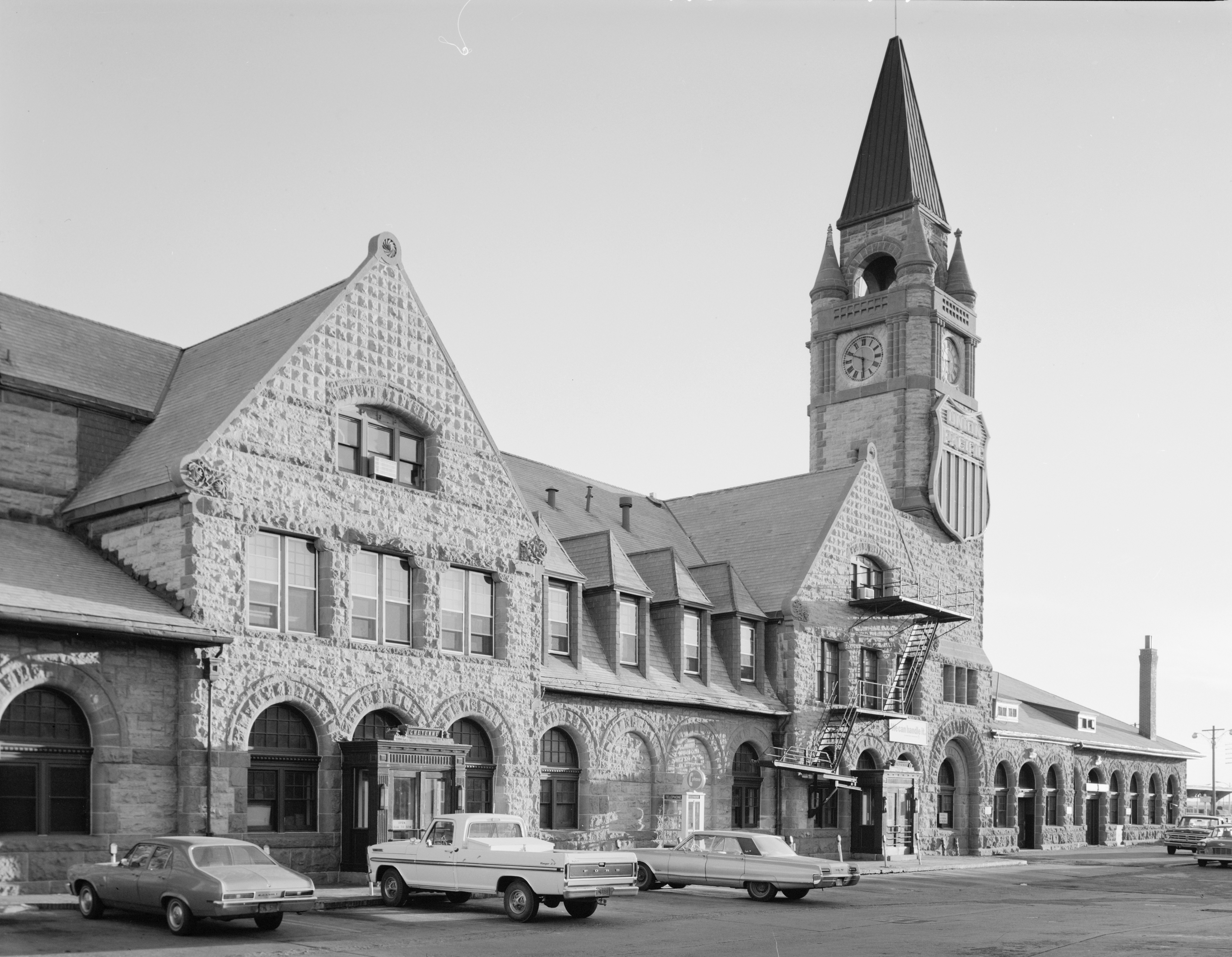
- Union Pacific Passenger Station
- Location: 121 W. 15th St., Cheyenne, Wyoming
- Coordinates: 41°7′54″N 104°48′51″W
- Built: 1887
- Architect: Van Brunt & Howe
- Architectural style: Romanesque Revival, Richardsonian Romanesque
- NRHP reference No.: 73001934 (depot); 92000930

Significant dates
- Added to NRHP: January 29, 1973 (depot); July 24, 1992
- Designated NHL: February 15, 2006 (depot)
Location

The Cheyenne Depot Museum is a railroad museum in Cheyenne, Wyoming, United States. It is located inside the 1880s Union Pacific Railroad depot. A National Historic Landmark, the station was the railroad's largest west of Council Bluffs, Iowa, and a major western example of Richardsonian Romanesque architecture.

The museum, founded in 1993, interprets Cheyenne's early history and that of the construction of the Union Pacific Railroad. It houses multiple exhibits and occasionally offers tours of other railroad facilities.

== History ==
The Depot was built directly down the street from and facing the Wyoming State Capitol building, signaling its significance to the city and state.

John F. Coots was hired by the Union Pacific Railroad in 1886 to complete the depot. In the middle of July 1886, the Cheyenne community celebrated the placement of the cornerstone. The stone blocks were transported from the Union Pacific quarry to the Cheyenne depot by train. As the project continued, the administration hired more laborers to accommodate a May 1887 completion. The Cheyenne depot underwent a renovation in 1922, adding a 114 ft addition to the east side of the building. This addition was a near mirror of the west part of the depot and was built by H.W. Baum. The quarry used in 1886 for the original building was reopened and used to acquire matching stone for the new addition. The addition accompanied a dining room as well as a kitchen.

The building was lengthened and renovated in 1922. In 1929, the depot underwent another major renewal, steel replaced structural wood members, and the interior was reimagined in the Art Deco style. Further renovations were made from 2001 to 2006, including a $6.5 million improvement by the city of Cheyenne and a plaza built in front of the Depot. This plaza hosts a variety of music and events throughout the year.

Amtrak's San Francisco Zephyr ceased serving this station directly in 1979 in favor of a new station in Borie, nine miles to the west. This eliminated a time-consuming backup move in and out of the Cheyenne station. Passengers were bused between Borie and Cheyenne. Passenger rail service ended altogether in Wyoming when Amtrak canceled its Pioneer in 1997.

As of 2022, a new train service is proposed to connect Cheyenne and Pueblo, Colorado.

The Old West Museum and Cheyenne Frontier Days made an agreement that established the Cheyenne Depot Museum, Inc., as a 501(c)3 non-profit organization. The organization leased the depot from the city of Cheyenne for 25 years.

== Architecture ==
=== Exterior ===
The original design of the depot was a Richardsonian Romanesque style, designed by Van Brunt & Howe. There are many notable architectural elements used in the depot's design including rounded arches, a tall clock tower, dual-colored sandstone, and pitched roofs. Large rounded arches make up the north and south facades of the depot, as well as a clock tower standing six stories tall on the north side of the building. The clock tower features 4 conical spires on each corner with a pyramidal roof capped by a cast-iron weather vane. Towards the top of the tower facing North, South, East, and West, are 4 clock faces spanning 6 feet 4 inches in diameter. The clock however, was not installed until 1890, 3 years after the building was completed. The Union Pacific quarry in Bellevue, CO produced a red-orange and a softer sand-colored stone to be used on the depot. The red-orange stone was used to outline arches, windows, roof lines, floor lines, and doors. In some cases, the red-orange stones were used to create false windows. The dark, slate, pitched roof features 4 congruent dormer windows facing the depot square.

=== Interior ===
When the dining room and kitchen were added, interior finishes included wood paneling, coffered ceilings, and tile floors. Gilbert Stanley Underwood redecorated the Depot Interior in 1929. Some of these new decorations included new paint and plaster.

== Gallery ==
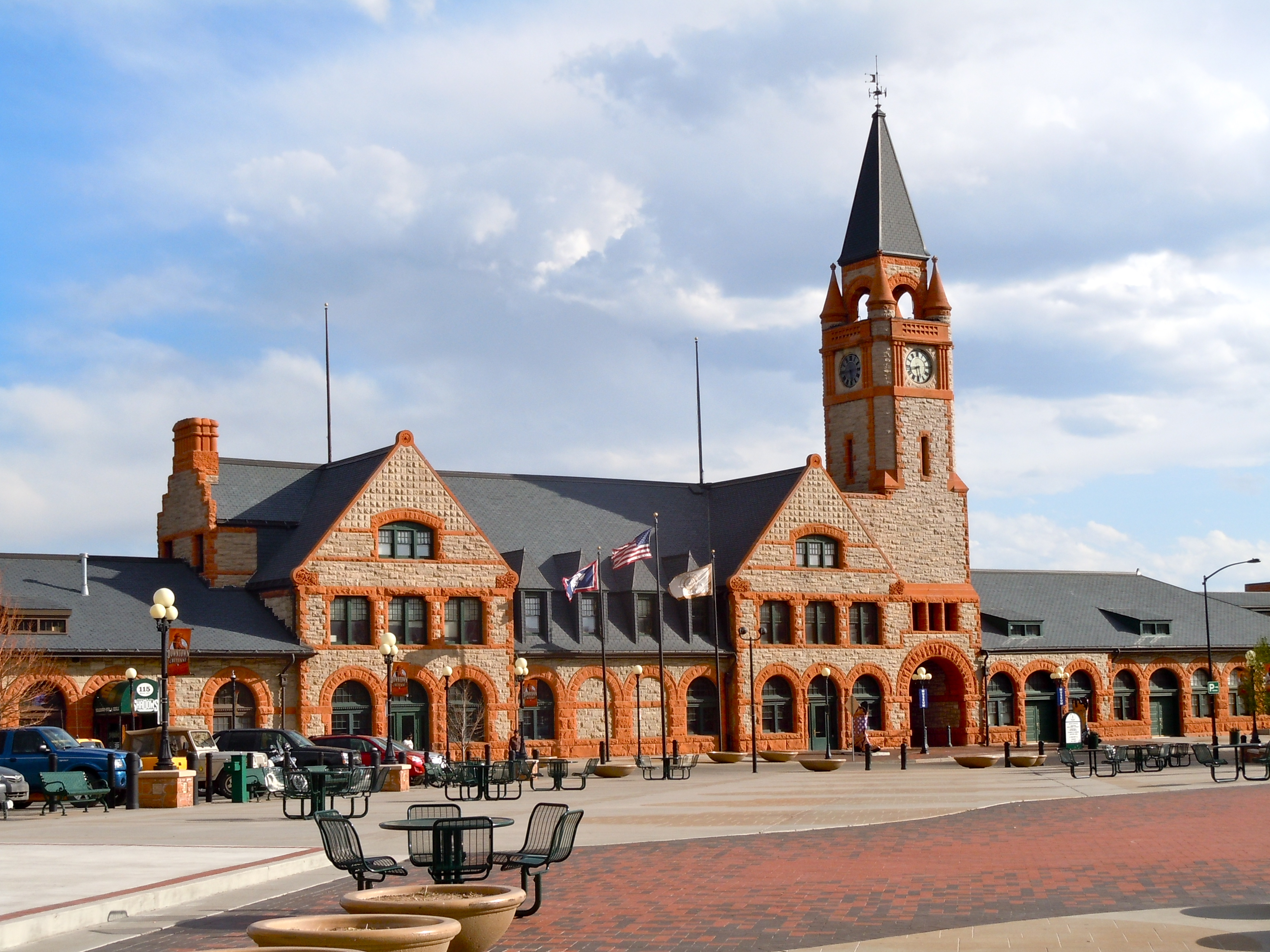
2011 photo of the depot

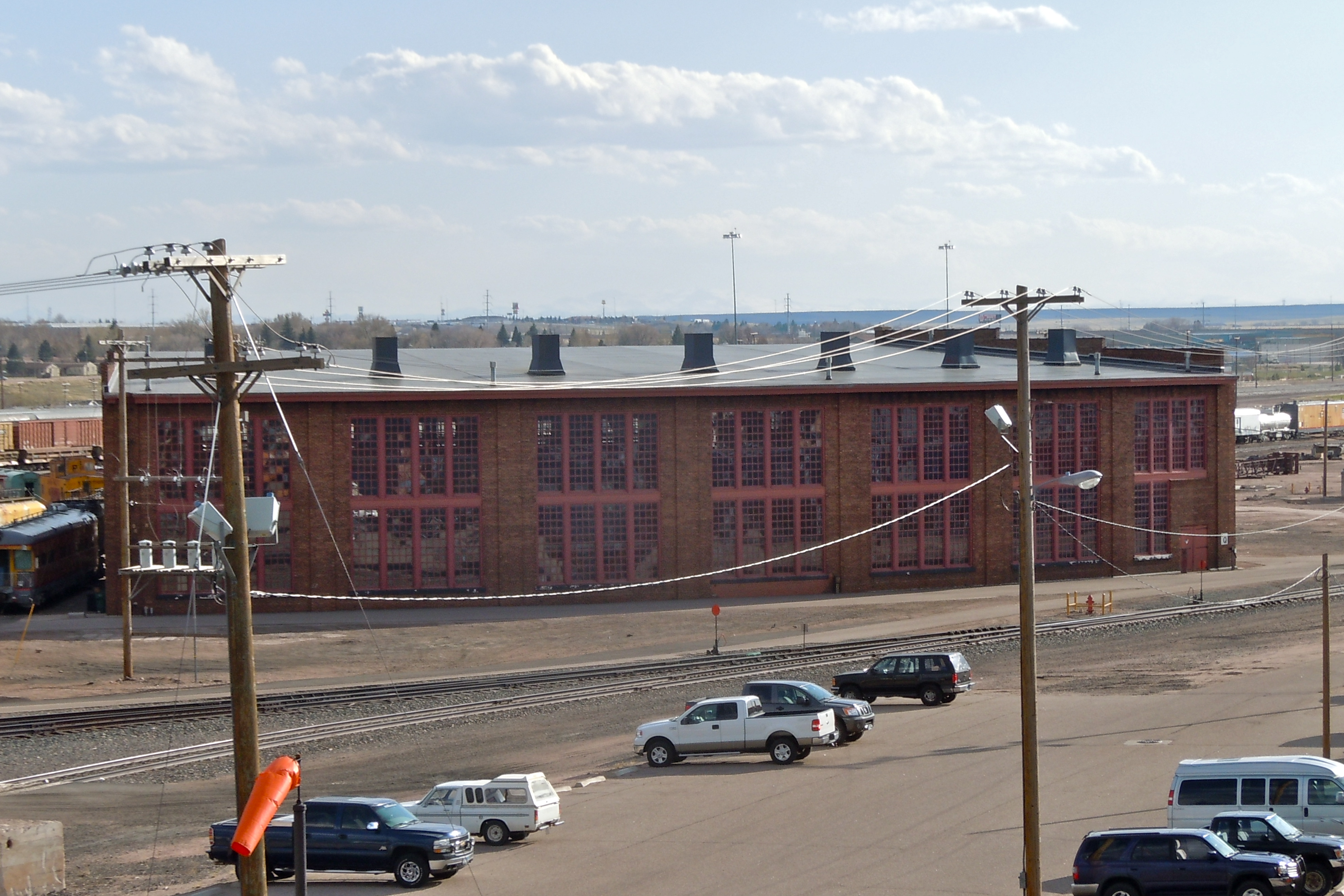
The nearby roundhouse where the Union Pacific Railroad stores its historic steam locomotives and E9 diesel locomotives.

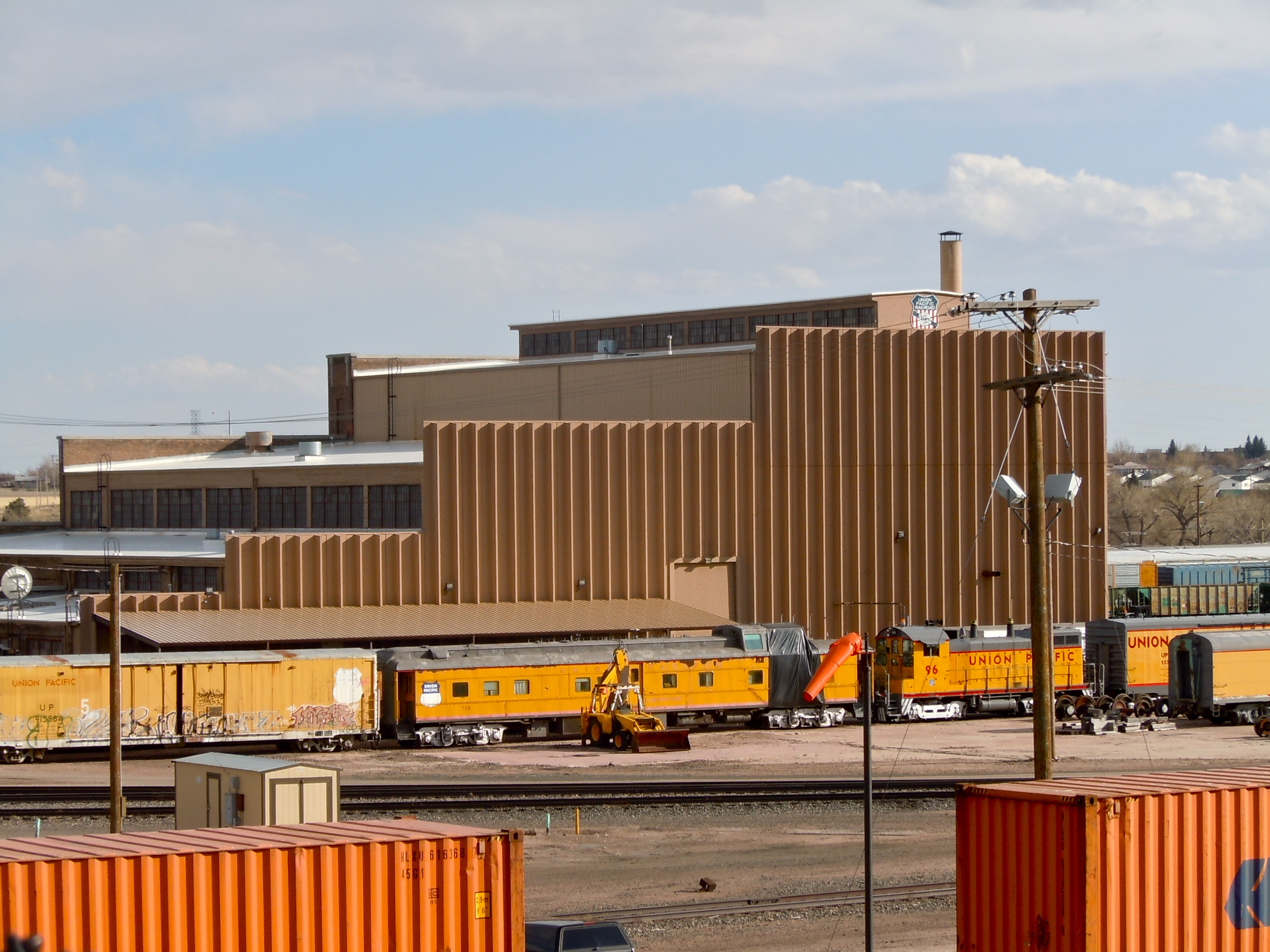
UP's nearby machine shop, where it services its steam locomotives.

== See also ==
- Union Pacific 844
- Union Pacific 3985
- Union Pacific 4014
- Union Pacific 6936
- Cheyenne Frontier Days
- Cheyenne Frontier Days Old West Museum
- List of National Historic Landmarks in Wyoming
- National Register of Historic Places listings in Laramie County, Wyoming
