= Greeley station =

Former railway station in Colorado, USA

Greeley, CO
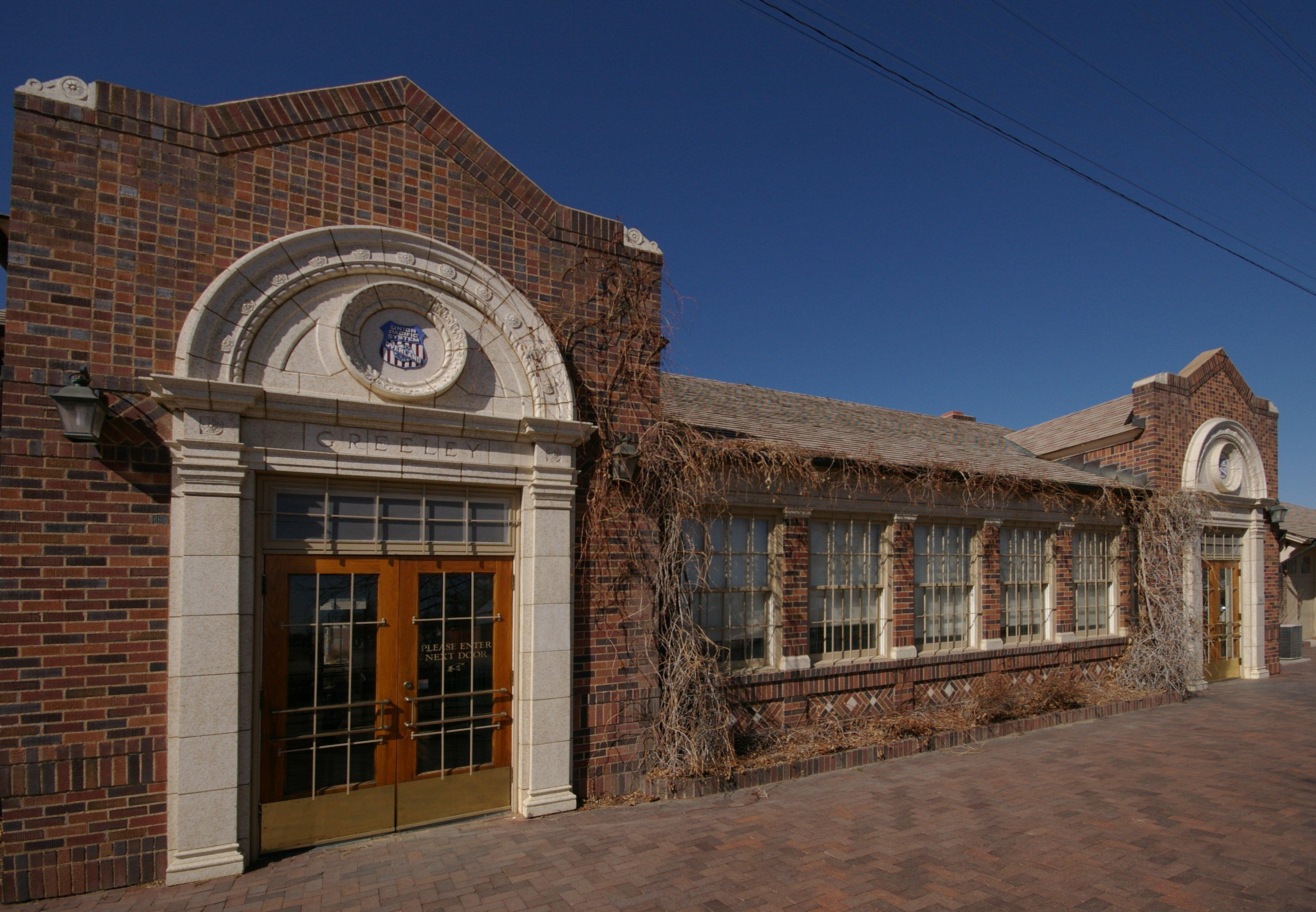
- The former Union Pacific Railroad Depot at Greeley.

General information
- Location: 902 Seventh Street, Greeley, Colorado 80631
- Line: Union Pacific Railroad

History
- Opened: 1930; June 17, 1991
- Closed: July 16, 1983; May 10, 1997

Former services
Preceding station	Amtrak	Following station
Borie toward Seattle	Pioneer 1991–1997	Denver toward Chicago
Cheyenne toward Oakland-16th Street	San Francisco Zephyr 1972–1983	Denver toward Chicago
Cheyenne toward Oakland-16th Street	City of San Francisco 1971–1972	Denver toward Chicago
Preceding station	Union Pacific Railroad	Following station
Evans toward Cheyenne	Cheyenne – Denver	Lucerne toward Denver
Terminus	Greeley – Briggsdale	Cloverly toward Briggsdale
Terminus	Greeley – Purcell	Cloverly toward Purcell
- Greeley Union Pacific Railroad Depot
- U.S. National Register of Historic Places
- Location: Jct. of 7th Ave. and 9th St., Greeley, Colorado
- Coordinates: 40°25′27″N 104°41′17″W
- Built: 1930
- Architect: Gilbert Stanley Underwood; Mead and Mount Construction Co.
- Architectural style: Late 19th And 20th Century Revivals
- NRHP reference No.: 93001180
- Added to NRHP: November 4, 1993
Location

Greeley station is a former railway station in Greeley, Colorado. It was constructed by Union Pacific Railroad, and is listed on the National Register of Historic Places as the Greeley Union Pacific Railroad Depot. It was designed by Gilbert Stanley Underwood.

Amtrak's San Francisco Zephyr served Greeley until 1983, when Amtrak re-routed the Zephyr off the Union Pacific's Overland Route and on to the Denver & Rio Grande Western main line. This move also ended all service in Wyoming. Service resumed in 1991 when Amtrak started running the Pioneer through Wyoming, but then ended again with the cancellation of the Pioneer in 1997. Greeley was listed on the National Register of Historic Places in 1993.

The building now serves as an office for the Greeley Convention & Visitors Bureau.

== See also ==
- National Register of Historic Places listings in Weld County, Colorado
