= Laramie station (Wyoming) =

Historic Place in Laramie, Wyoming, United States

Laramie, WY
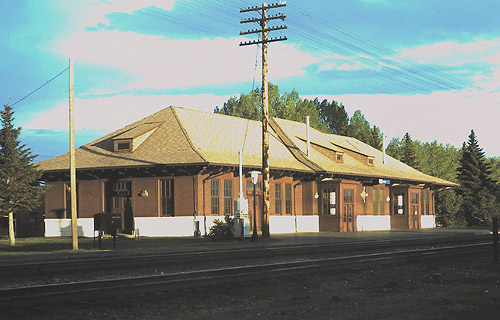
- Laramie station in June 1978

General information
- Location: Railroad Heritage Park; 600 South 1st Street, Laramie, Wyoming
- Coordinates: 41.3083°N 105.5960°W
- Owner: Railroad Depot Association
- Line: Union Pacific Railroad
- Platforms: 1 side platform, 1 island platform (formerly)

History
- Opened: 1868; June 17, 1991
- Closed: July 16, 1983; May 10, 1997
- Rebuilt: October 6, 1924

Former services
| Preceding station | Amtrak | Following station |
|---|---|---|
| Rawlins toward Seattle | Pioneer 1991–1997 | Borie toward Chicago |
| Rawlins toward Oakland-16th Street | San Francisco Zephyr 1972–1983 | Borie 1979–1983 toward Chicago |
| Rawlins toward Oakland-16th Street | San Francisco Zephyr 1972–1983 | Cheyenne 1972–1979 toward Chicago |
| Rawlins toward Oakland-16th Street | City of San Francisco 1971–1972 | Cheyenne toward Chicago |
| Preceding station | Union Pacific Railroad | Following station |
| Lookout toward Ogden | Overland Route | Hermosa toward Council Bluffs Transfer |
Location

1924 Picture of the Laramie Depot, showing the completion of the new 1924 depot.

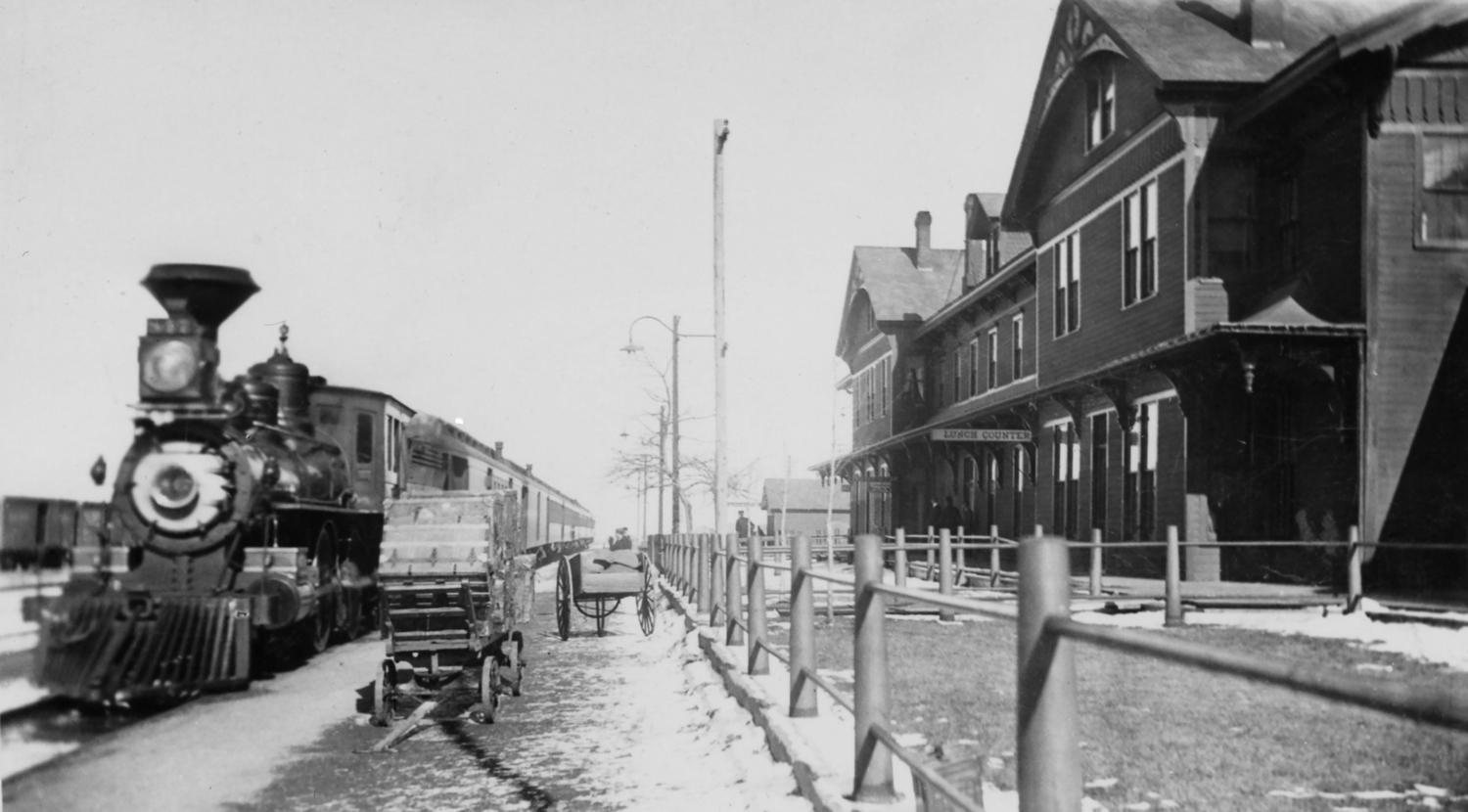
1885 Picture of the 1868 Laramie Depot

1900 Picture of the 1868 Laramie Depot with new wings, lost in 1917 fire

1890 rail yard, with water tank at Laramie Depot rail yard

The Laramie Railroad Depot was built in 1924 and used as the Union Pacific Railroad passenger train depot until 1971, when it became a Amtrak depot till 1997. The depot is located in Laramie, Wyoming at 600 South 1st Street. Passenger service at the depot was temporarily halted from 1983 to 1991. In 1985, the depot was given to the Laramie Plains Museum, ownership was transferred to the Railroad Depot Association in 2009. The Snow Train Rolling Stock at the depot's park is a U.S. National Register of Historic Places.

== History ==
The 1924 train depot, the second depot at the site, officially opened at 7:00 pm, October 6, 1924, at 1 Street and Kearney Street. The original train depot at the site was built in 1868, in what was then the Dakota Territory as part of the First transcontinental railroad. Union Pacific Railroad Chief Engineer, Grenville M. Dodge had picked the site for the depot. This included a main rail repair facility, with machine shops and a roundhouse. The Union Pacific had 153 men working at the depot as recorded in the 1870 census and 20 working at the depot hotel, out of a town population of 820. Many of the workers live on the West side of the tracks/depot in what is now the Laramie West Side Historic District. Later, an ice storage warehouse was built for ice cars used for moving fresh fruit and vegetables. The first Union Pacific train arrived on May 4, 1868, at the original station. The town grew quickly with the arrival of the train, what is known as a Hell-on-Wheels tent city popped up. The growth was in part because Laramie was the western terminal of the Union Pacific Railroad for a few months, till more western tracks were laid. In just two weeks after the train arrived, the city had a population of 2,000. The original Hotel at The depot was named in honor of Major Thomas Thornburg, who was killed by Ute Indians near Milk Creek, Colorado, on September 29, 1879. The Thornburg Hotel and sometimes called the Thornburg House, was a first-class hotel for the times. The depot also operated a restaurant. The depot was enlarged in 1900, with the addition of two new wings to its sides. Other major improvements were done in 1910, like enlarging the Laramie train yard. Just seven years after the major improvements, on October 17, 1917, the station caught fire. Only one wing, the women's waiting room, was saved. The women's waiting room was converted into the main train depot and was operated this way for seven years. In 1924, construction of a new train depot was completed. Union Pacific ran the City of San Francisco passenger train from 1936 to 1971 a Chicago, Illinois and Oakland, California run with a stop at the depot. During World War II, up to 14 trains a day passed through the Laramie Depot. In the 1940s and 1950s, the Union Pacific Railroad ran the largest steam engine locomotive through the depot, the Union Pacific Big Boy locomotive. Union Pacific had 25 Big Boys built for pulling heavy loads over the mountains.

In the 1950s, the Union Pacific started replacing steam locomotives with diesel locomotives. Diesel locomotives are safer and require less maintenance. The repair shops at the rail yard were closed, and many workers were laid off. In 1964, Union Pacific demolished the machine shops, the roundhouse and the power plant. The town changed from a rail town to a university town. The Union Pacific Railroad ended passenger service at the Laramie depot in 1971. Amtrak took over passenger service at the depot with its Chicago–Oakland San Francisco Zephyr service. In 1983, Amtrak no longer stopped at the Laramie depot as the San Francisco Zephyr service ended. Passenger service started again when the Pioneer was rerouted from Denver, Colorado to Ogden, Utah in 1991, but this ended in 1997. The Amtrak Desert Wind stopped at the depot from 1979 to 1997, it ran from Chicago to Los Angeles. The Union Pacific planned to demolish the Laramie depot in 1985. But, with strong community support, the depot was saved and is used as both a railroad heritage museum and a community center. The Depot is the only remaining building of the past large Union Pacific rail yard in Laramie and is Laramie's historic rail legacy. The Railroad Depot Association operates the depot building's railroad memorabilia. The depot also hosts community functions like: music concerts, art exhibits, and public meetings. The Depot is also rented for weddings, banquets, and other events. The depot has free tours on Mondays from 9 am to 2 pm and by appointment. Around the depot is the large Depot Park, the Railroad Heritage Park. A farmer's market is held on Fridays in the depot parking lot during the summer.

== See also ==
- Overland Route (Union Pacific Railroad)
- Albany County, Wyoming monuments and markers
- Laramie, North Park and Western Railroad
- Borie station
- Cheyenne Depot Museum
- Evanston Depot
- Council Bluffs Transfer Depot
