= Union Pacific Railroad Complex (Evanston, Wyoming) =

- U.S. National Register of Historic Places
- U.S. Historic district
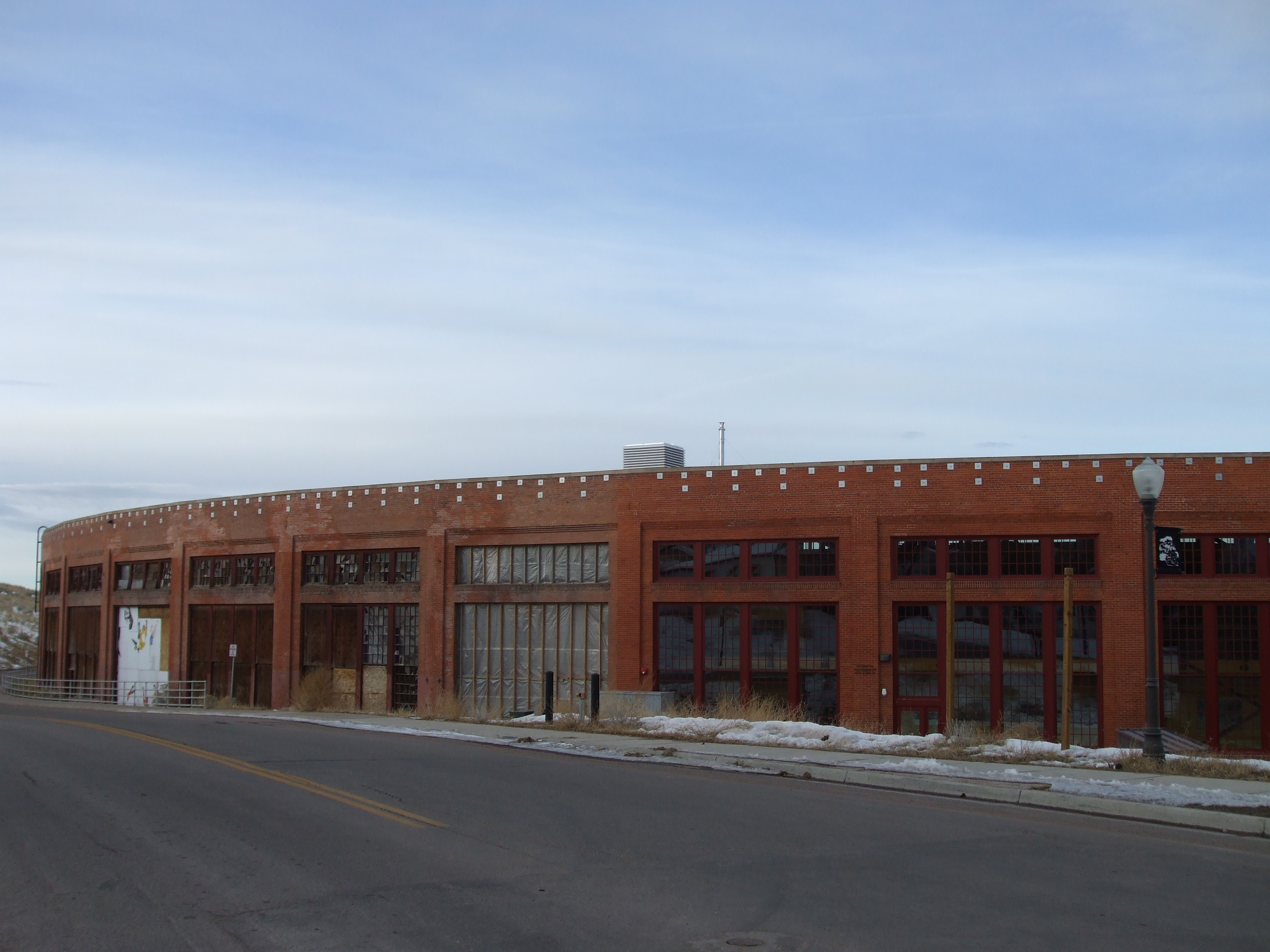
- Part of the roundhouse

- Location within Wyoming Location within the United States
- Location: Main and 15th Sts., Evanston, Wyoming
- Coordinates: 41°16′16″N 110°58′9″W
- Area: 15 acres (6.1 ha)
- Built: 1885
- Architect: Union Pacific
- NRHP reference No.: 85000685
- Added to NRHP: February 26, 1985

The Union Pacific Railroad Complex in Evanston, Wyoming, was built to serve the Union Pacific Railroad main line running through Evanston. The complex's brick buildings were built in 1912–13, with frame buildings spanning the period from 1871 to the 1920s. The complex features a roundhouse with 27 stalls built during the 1912 improvement phase, replacing an earlier roundhouse built in 1871. The complex was the chief service point on the UP main line between Ogden, Utah, and Green River, Wyoming.

Five brick structures remain: the roundhouse, machine shop, gas building, storehouse and the mineral building. Five frame buildings include an office, a woodworking shop and a company store.

The maintenance depot was closed and transferred to Green River in 1927. The Evanston complex became the Union Pacific Reclamation Plant, where rolling stock received heavy overhaul. It was the largest employer in Evanston, employing more than 300. The Union Pacific deeded the complex to Evanston in 1974. An overhaul facility for railcars reopened the same year. Starting as the Wyoming Railcar Company, the operation was absorbed by the Lithcote Company, which was in turn acquired by the Union Tank Car Company. The Union Tank Car Company moved out of the complex in 1998. The roundhouse complex is being restored by the Evanston Renewal Agency. The Union Pacific Railroad Complex was listed on the National Register of Historic Places in 1985.

== Evanston Depot ==
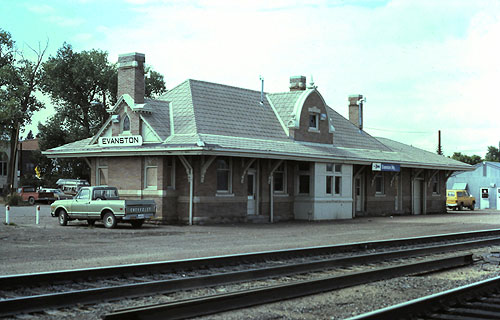
Evanston Depot in September 1982

The Evanston train depot is at 920 Front St, Evanston, in the Evanston Depot Square. The Union Pacific Railroad Complex is just northwest of the old Union Pacific train station. The depot replaced the older one built in June 1869. The Evanston Depot was built in 1900 and donated to the city of Evanston in the late 1980s. The depot last saw service in 1983, when the San Francisco Zephyr was discontinued and again from 1991 to 1997 with the Pioneer. In the 1950s, the Union Pacific started replacing steam locomotives with diesel locomotives. Diesel locomotives are safer and require less maintenance. The repair shops at the rail yard were closed, and many workers were laid off. The roundhouse and shops were closed in 1971. The Union Pacific Railroad ended passenger service at the Evanston depot in 1971. Amtrak took over passenger service at the depot with its Chicago–Oakland San Francisco Zephyr service. In 1983, Amtrak no longer stopped at the Evanston depot as the San Francisco Zephyr service ended. The Amtrak Desert Wind stopped at the depot from 1979 to 1997, it ran from Chicago to Los Angeles. Passenger service started again when the Pioneer was rerouted from Denver, Colorado to Ogden, Utah in 1991, but this ended in 1997. while Delta, Utah, was added April 24, 1983.

Preceding station	Union Pacific Railroad	Following station
Wahsatch toward Ogden	Overland Route	Knight toward Council Bluffs Transfer

== See also ==
- Laramie Railroad Depot
- Cheyenne Depot Museum
- Green River station (Wyoming)
- Wyoming historical monuments and markers
