= Council Bluffs Transfer Depot =

Former railway station in Iowa, USA

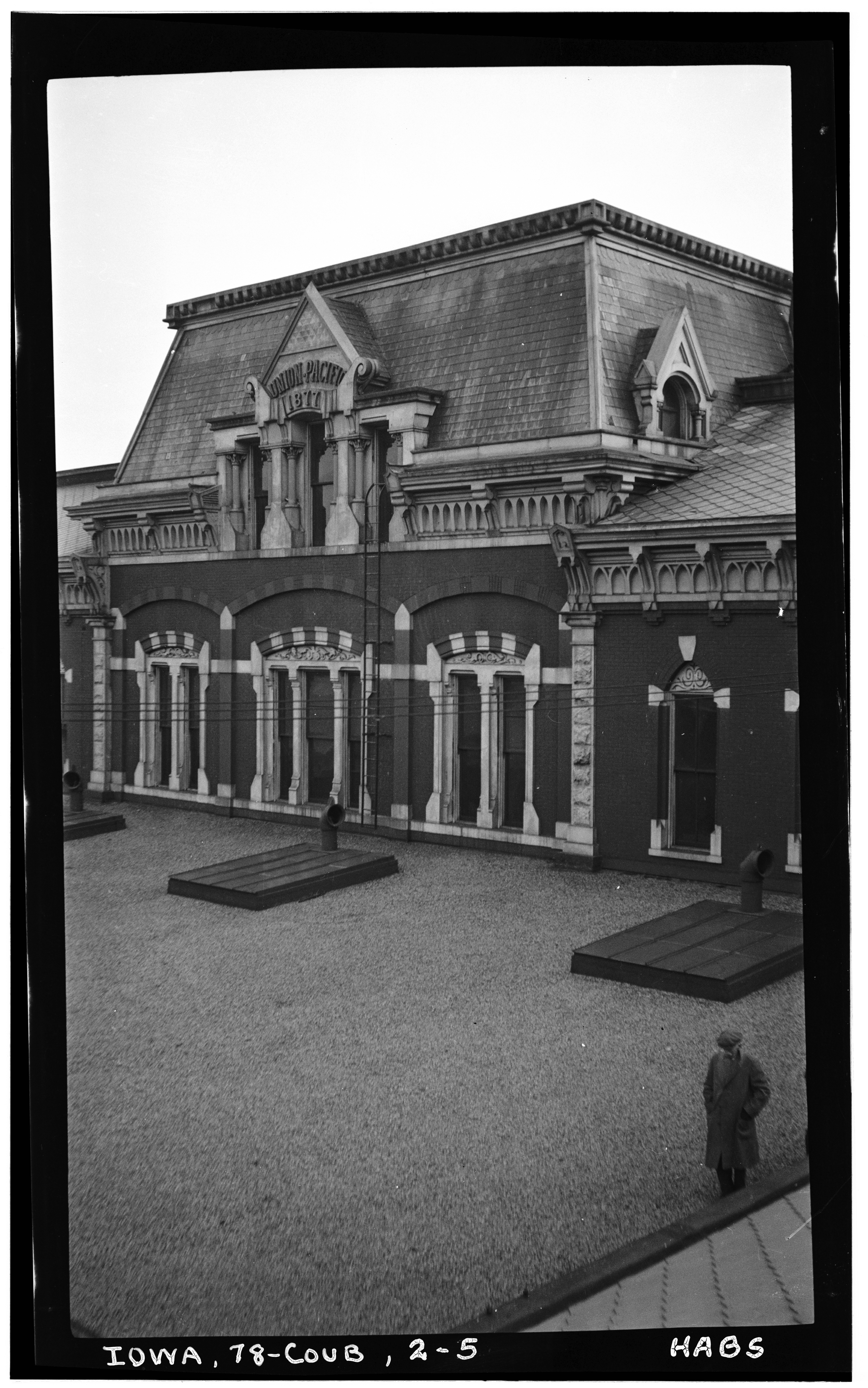
- Union Pacific Station Transfer Depot and Hotel

General information
- Location: 1000 South 21 Street; Council Bluffs, Iowa
- Coordinates: 41.252528°N 95.875278°W
- Lines: Union Pacific Railroad; First transcontinental railroad

History
- Opened: 1878 (original depot 1865)
- Closed: 1928 - Hotel demolished before 1936

Former services
Preceding station	Union Pacific Railroad	Following station
Omaha toward Ogden	Overland Route	Terminus
Location

Council Bluffs Transfer Depot is a former train station in Council Bluffs, Iowa. The depot had a grand hotel as it was the terminus for the First transcontinental railroad that headed west from the depot. In 1872, the Union Pacific Railroad built the Union Pacific Missouri River Bridge over the Missouri River connecting the transcontinental railroad (Union Pacific Railroad Overland Route) and Omaha, Nebraska to Council Bluffs. The bridge was 2,750 feet (840 m) long, and from the bridge had a one-mile long track which led up to the Council Bluffs Transfer Depot and its hotel. The depot and Council Bluffs Transfer Hotel names were given due to the many eastern trains that arrived for passengers and freight/US mail, which transferred to the transcontinental railroad heading west. The Depot and Hotel was built in the high high victorian italianate architecture style.

== Depot and hotel ==
Council Bluffs, in Pottawatomie County, was chosen to be the First transcontinental railroad the eastern terminus of the first transcontinental railroad. The bridge was opened in 1872, but the city of Council Bluffs still had to sue the Union Pacific to enforce the fact that the Eastern end of the transcontinental railroad was in Council Bluffs. The 1878 brick masonry Council Bluffs Transfer Depot replaced the 1874 depot that was destroyed in a fire. The First transcontinental railroad, in its planning stage, had two other possible eastern terminus St. Joseph, Missouri and Kansas City, Kansas. Council Bluffs was selected as the depot was north of the Missouri Civil War and it was a shorter route to the Wyoming Rocky Mountains high plains crossing, which followed much of the Oregon Trail. The Council Bluffs Union Pacific passenger train started in 1865. The depot was on the north side of the vast Union Pacific rail yard, with the river to the west and the town to the North and East. The vast rail yard also has a vast livestock yard to serve the meat markets to the east and west. At its peak, seven eastern railroads came to the Council Bluffs Transfer Depot. The depot/hotel designed by Union Pacific Superintendent S. H. H. Clark (1836-1900). The depot/hotel was a grand three-story building. The main lobby had 20-foot high ceilings and was built with fine black walnut and white pine. The depot had two wings; the south wing was the offices for five express train companies. The north wing had: a first-class dining room, barbershop, saloon bar, lunch counter, newsstand, and two waiting rooms for male and female travelers. On the second floor was the Transfer Depot Hotel. The rooms were lined along a 207-foot-long hallway. At each end of the hall were large parlors. For second-class and third-class travelers, the depot had a separate nearby emigrant hotel. The emigrant hotel housed the bakery, laundry rooms, land office, and the freight cold storage warehouse. A sign was installed in the waiting depot room that read: “The West begins here”. The Council Bluffs Transfer Depot was closed for over a week in 1881, due to the Great Flood of 1881 on the Missouri River from April 1, 1881, to April 27, 1881. The winter had heavy snowfall, and spring came late that year. The flood water in Council Bluffs came up to 9th street; the Council Bluffs Transfer Depot was on 10th street. In 1883, the city of Council Bluffs had eight railroad depots, eight railway roundhouse and six freight depots. To support the busy railway the city had 51 livery stables and 31 hotels; the Grand Council Bluffs Transfer Depot/hotel was one of the eight. In 1928, the hotel closed. In the 1940s, and World War II, the United States Postal Service Council Bluffs Transfer Depot mail depot became the largest mail transfer office in the United States until the 1970s. In the 1940s, 21 different passenger trains stopped in Council Bluff. The rail yards at the site of Council Bluffs Transfer Depot is still vast and busy today. There is no trace of the old depot/hotel.

== Golden Spike Monument ==
Golden Spike Monument
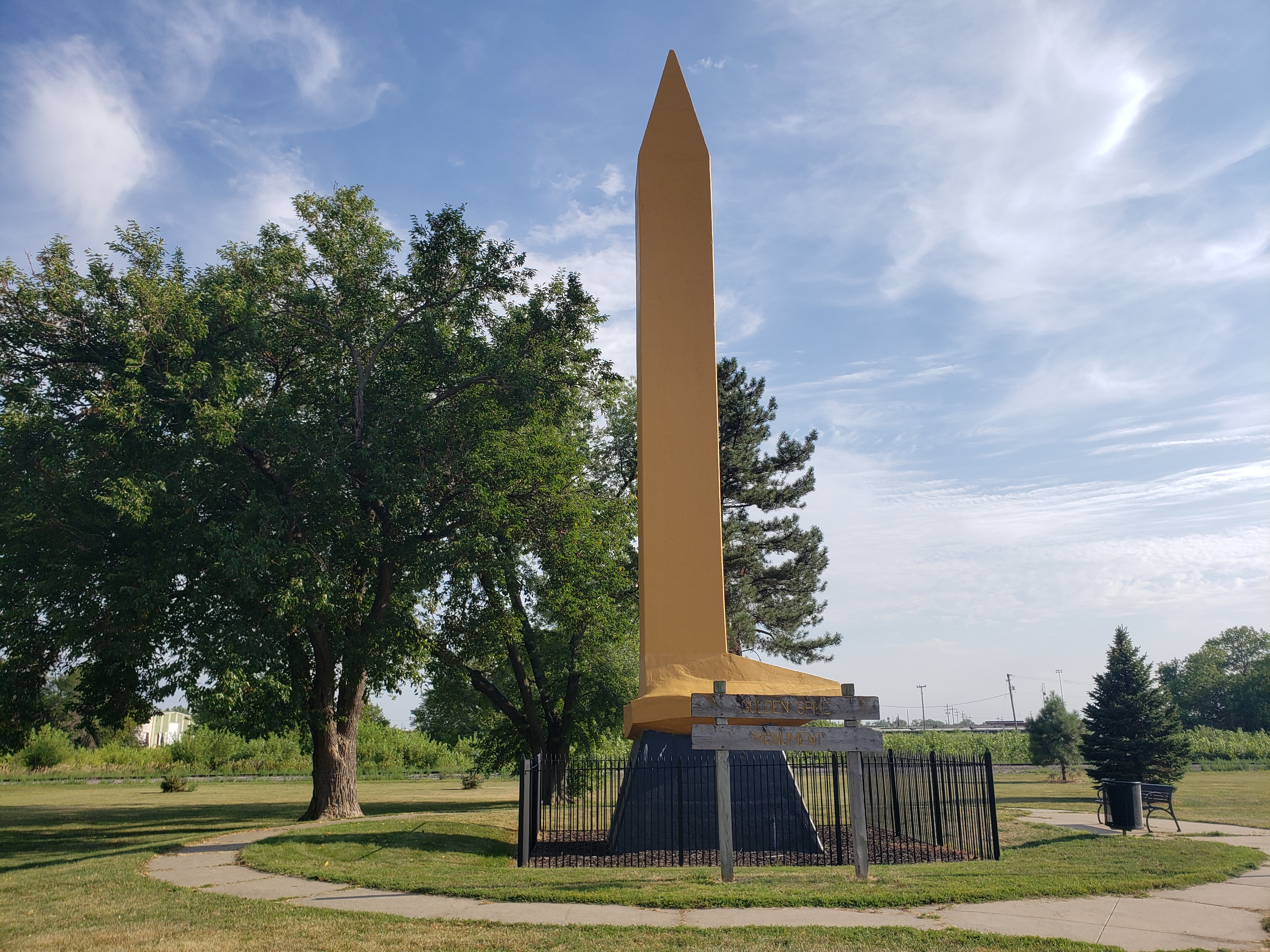
- Golden Spike Monument in Council Bluffs, built in 1939, just north of the Council Bluffs Transfer

- Location within Iowa Location within the United States
- 41.253333°N 95.874333°W
- Location: 2073 9th Avenue, Council Bluffs, Iowa

History
- Built: 1939
- Built for: Council Bluffs

Site notes
- Architect: Jack Boyne

In 1939, one block north of the Council Bluffs Transfer Depot at 2073 9th Avenue, S. 21st Street & 9th Avenue, the Golden Spike Monument was dedicated. It marks the 0.0 milepost of the eastern terminus of the Union Pacific Railroad transcontinental railroad. The Golden Spike Monument was dedicated on the 70th anniversary of the May 10, 1869 Golden Spike ceremony at Promontory Summit, Utah. Also, for the 70th anniversary Cecil B. DeMille made the film Union Pacific. At a Council Bluffs City Council Meeting, in March 1939, engineer Jack Boyne motioned that a monument be built of the 70th anniversary. City Council approved the Boyne design and the $3,500 Monument was built with 14 men in just 10 days. The Monument was completed on April 26, 1939. The monument is 59 feet tall and is 243,200 pounds, about 100 times the size of a railroad spike. The Golden Spike Monument is built of reinforced concrete and painted gold. The Golden Spike Days were held to celebrate the monument, the film, and the 70th anniversary. Golden Spike Days was a four-day celebration held in both Council Bluffs and Omaha starting on April 28, 1939. Golden Spike Days had parades, many citizens in 1880 period costumes, an Indian Village, whisker Contests, a 1869 steam locomotive, Old Timers Club Members events, a costume Ball, and the Vincent Lopez orchestra.

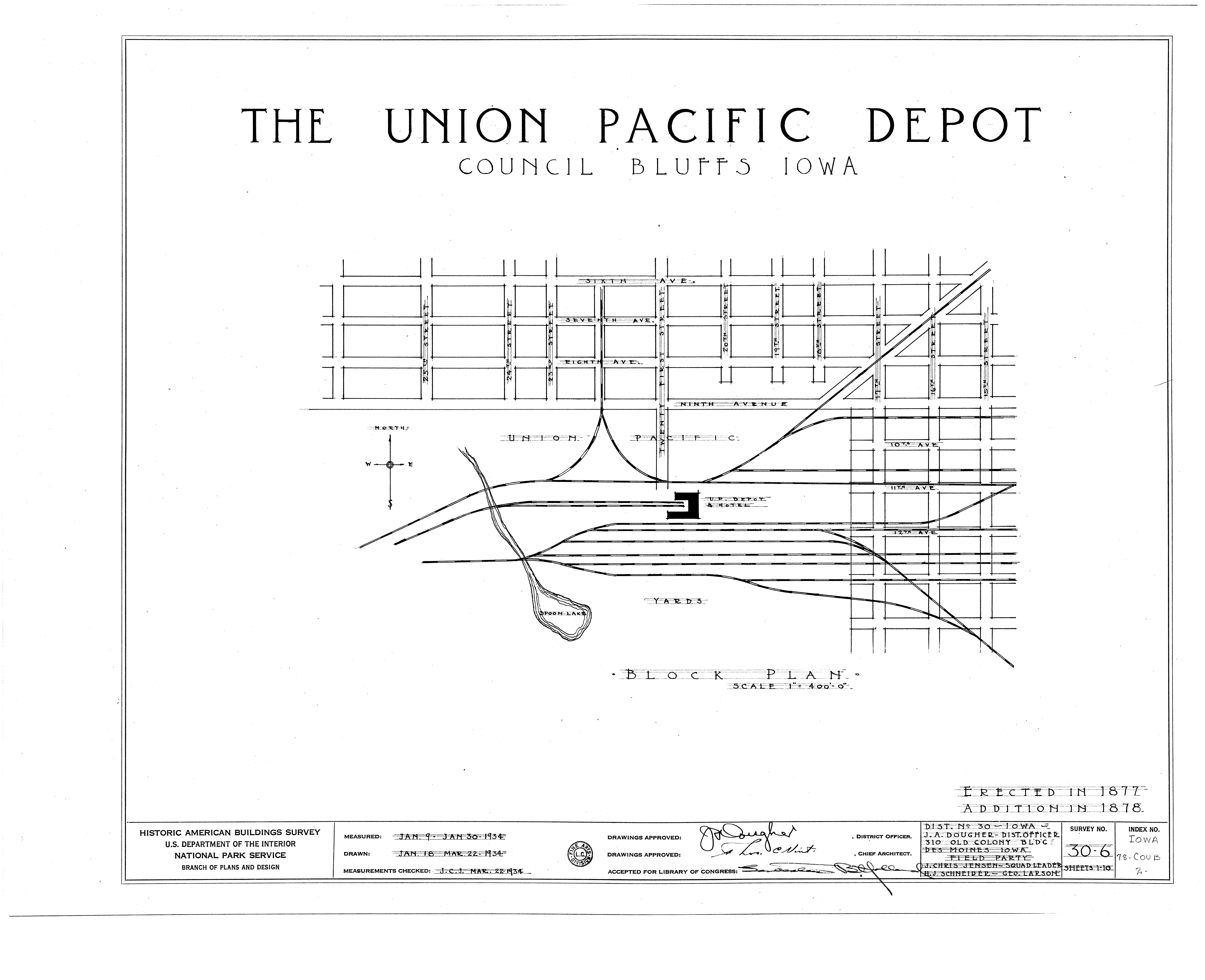
Site the Council Bluffs Transfer Depot, black box in center of map, above the rail yard

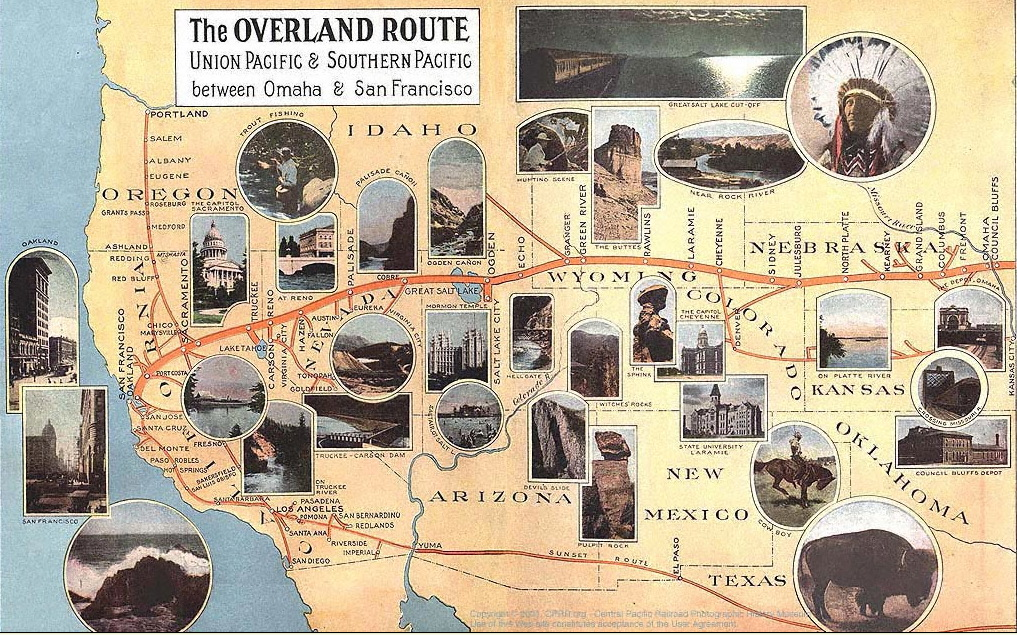
The Overland Route map from 1908, Council Bluffs Transfer Depot is the start

== Train service ==
The 1800s passenger trains in Council Bluffs:

- Union Pacific Railroad - First transcontinental railroad Overland Route
- Council Bluffs and St. Joseph Railroad - Hannibal and St. Joseph Railroad, later part of the Chicago, Burlington and Quincy Railroad
- The Chicago and North Western Railway -The Cedar Rapids and Missouri River Railroad
- Rock Island - Mississippi and Missouri Railroad
- Wabash Railroad 1837–1964 to Brunswick, Missouri
- Chicago and St. Paul - The Milwaukee Road
- Illinois Central Railroad (later became the Chicago and Central Pacific Railroad)
- Missouri Pacific Railroad
- From 1886 till 1948 the transfer depot connected to the streetcars of the Omaha and Council Bluffs Railway and Bridge Company, an omnibus and the Omaha passenger station.

The 1900’s passenger trains in Council Bluffs:

- Chicago Great Western Railway
- Fort Dodge and Omaha Railroad, part of the Dubuque & Sioux City Railroad, built in 1899 to Tara, Iowa (now a Ghost Town)
- Iowa and St. Louis Railway

The 1940’s passenger trains in Council Bluffs:

- Union Pacific Railroad - Los Angeles Limited, Utahn, City of St. Louis, passenger service ended in 1971
- Burlington Service: Silver Streak Zephyr, California Zephyr, and Chicago Express
- Great Western Service: Nebraska Limited, Omaha Express, Twin City Express, and Twin City Limited
- Northwestern Service: City of Denver, City of Los Angeles, Gold Coast, National Parks Special, North American, and San Francisco Overland
- Milwaukee Service: Arrow and Midwest Hiawatha Rock Island's Corn Belt Rocket, Des Moines-Omaha Limited, and Rocky Mountain Rocket
- Wabash Railroad Service: Omaha Limited and Saint Louis Limited

The 1960’s passenger trains in Council Bluffs:

- Norfolk and Western Railway
- Union Pacific Railroad

The 1990’s freight trains in Council Bluffs:

- Council Bluffs Railway in 2006 to Iowa Interstate Railroad
- Union Pacific Railroad

== Council Bluffs Transfer depots ==
Rail passengers, freight, and mail were transferred to and from other nearby rail lines to the Council Bluffs Transfer Depot. The city's streetcar service connected all the nearby train depots. There were so many railroads, and railroad workers in Council Bluffs, up to one-fourth of the town, that the city had the nickname of the Blue Denim City, after the railroads blue jeans denim uniforms. Here are some of the other depots in and around Council Bluffs:

- Mississippi and Missouri Railroad depot built in 1853, city's first railroad depot by the Missouri River, designed by George R. Mann. No trace remains.
- Chicago, St. Paul, Minneapolis & Omaha Railway (CStPM&O) the Omaha Road, later part of Union Pacific in 1995.
- Chicago and North Western Railway Depot at West Broadway & 12th Street, built in 1866, demolished in 1953
- Chicago, Rock Island and Pacific Railroad passenger depot at 16th and S. Main built in 1899
- Council Bluffs depot at Broadway and 11th Street, early Union Pacific train ferry built in 1867
- Council Bluffs depot at Lake Station built in 1872.
- The Saint Paul Depot on 16th Avenue (freight depot was at S. 19th Avenue and 5th)
- Illinois Central Railroad depot at Ave F and N. 13th street (Wallace Yards), built in 1906
- Fort Dodge & Omaha Railroad Depot at Avenue A and North 13th Street built in 1901
- Chicago & Great Western Railroad Depot on South Main Street and 9th Ave built in 1903, closed in 1955.
- Chicago & Great Western (CGW) passenger new depot at 15th Ave & 3rd St built in 1955, demolished in 2016
- Florence Depot, in Omaha, Nebraska built in 1888.
- Omaha station of the Chicago, Burlington and Quincy Railroad
- Omaha Union Station, now the Durham Museum built in 1931

== Legacy ==
While there is no trace of the Council Bluffs Transfer Depot, there are museums in Council Bluffs to remember the gold age of train travel:

- RailsWest Railroad Museum at 1512 South Main Street, Council Bluffs
- Union_Pacific Railroad Museum at 200 Pearl St, Council Bluffs
- The Historic General Dodge House at 605 S. 3rd St. Council Bluffs
- Durham Museum
- Golden Spike Monument is one block north of the site of the former Council Bluffs Transfer Depot.

== Gallery ==
Council Bluffs Transfer Depot in the Missouri River flood of 1881, water fills the Union Pacific Railroad railyard up to the Union Pacific Railroad Transfer Depot and hotel

Council Bluffs Transfer Depot outbuildings in the flood of 1881. The outbuilding housed the emigrant hotel, the bakery, laundry rooms, land office, and the freight cold storage warehouse.

Union Pacific Railroad, Council Bluffs Transfer Depot horse-streetcar in 1882 in Omaha, the streetcars connected the nearby train depots in Omaha and Council Bluffs, to the Council Bluffs Transfer Depot and hotel

Modified omnibus, the first Omaha streetcar in 1869, Omaha. Also used to connect the Council Bluffs train depots to the Council Bluffs Transfer Depot.

Omaha electric streetcar, 1887, also used to connect depots to Council Bluffs Transfer Depot.

== See also ==
- Overland Route (Union Pacific Railroad)
- Cheyenne Depot Museum
- Evanston Depot
- Laramie Railroad Depot
- List of Iowa railroads
