= Union Pacific 1243 =

Preserved American 4-6-0 locomotive

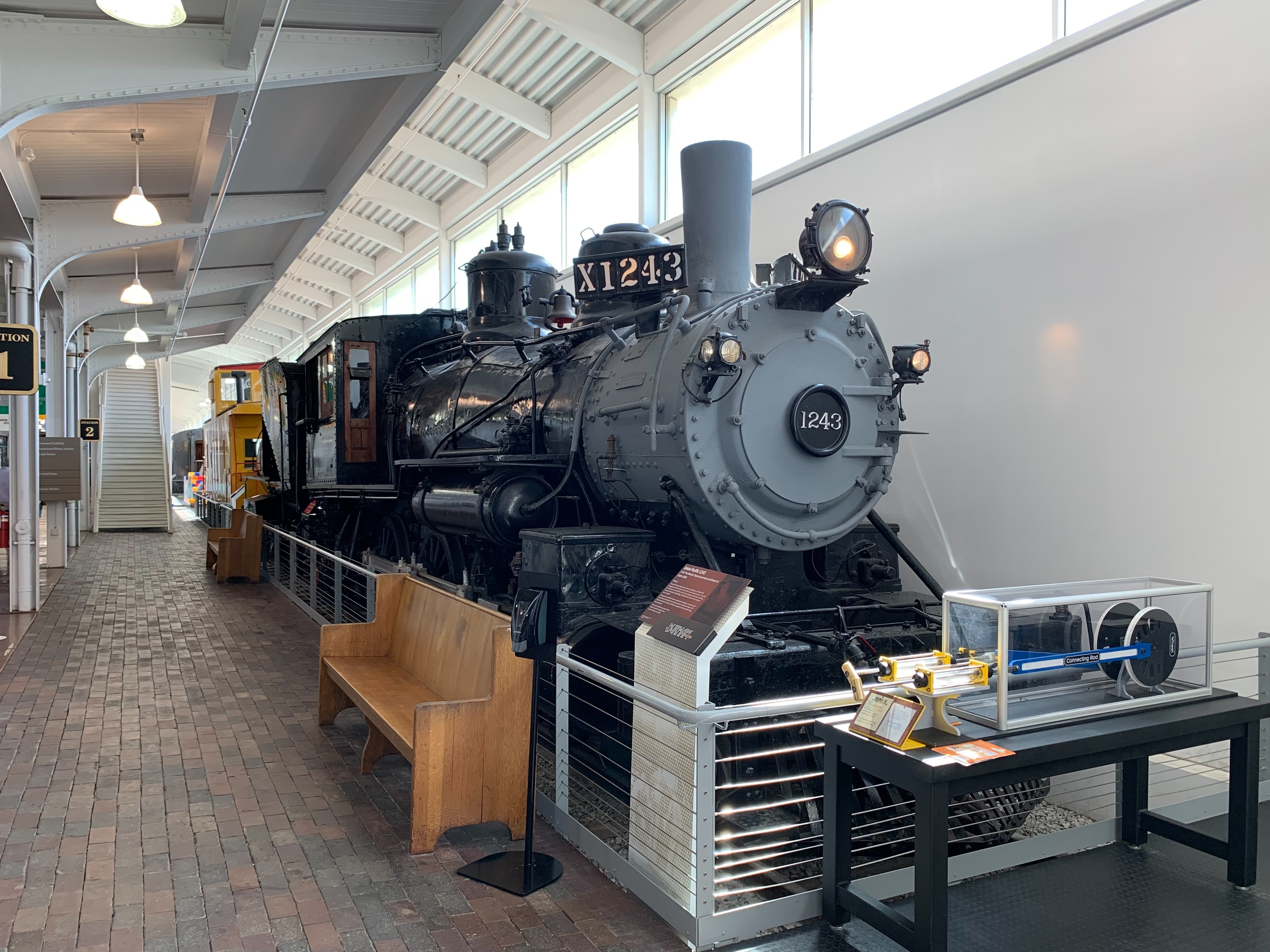
- UP No. 1243 on static display at the Durham Museum
Type and origin
- Power type: Steam
- Builder: American Locomotive Company (Cooke Works)
- Serial number: 2054
- Model: UP Class T-57
- Build date: October 1890
Specifications
- Configuration
  - Whyte: 4-6-0
  - UIC: 2′C n2, later 2′C h2
- Gauge: 4 ft 8 1/2 in (1,435 mm)
- Adhesive weight: 114,000 lb (52,000 kg)
- Loco weight: 148,500 lb (67,400 kg)
- Fuel type: Coal
- Boiler pressure: 165 lbf/in^{2} (1,140 kPa)
- Cylinders: Two, outside
- Cylinder size: 19 in × 24 in (483 mm × 610 mm)
- Valve gear: Stephenson
- Valve type: Slide
Performance figures
- Tractive effort: 21,300 lbf (95 kN)
- Factor of adh.: 5.35
Career
- Operators: Union Pacific Railroad
- Numbers: UP 1477; UP 1243
- Retired: 1956
- Restored: 1990 (cosmetically)
- Current owner: Durham Museum, Union Pacific Railroad
- Disposition: On static display

Union Pacific 1243 is a preserved 4-6-0 "Ten Wheeler" type steam locomotive on display at the Durham Museum in Omaha, Nebraska. Built in October 1890 by the American Locomotive Company's Cooke Works, No. 1243 is one of the oldest "Ten Wheelers" owned by the Union Pacific Railroad (UP). It is often named the "Harriman Engine" because, along with sister locomotive No. 1242 currently displayed in Cheyenne, Wyoming, it is the only engine owned by the Union Pacific Railroad from the era when E. H. Harriman controlled the Union Pacific.

== History ==
UP No. 1243 was built in 1890 by the American Locomotive Company's Cooke Works, originally numbered as UP No. 1477. It operated on various branch lines of the Union Pacific in Nebraska. It was renumbered 1243 in 1915. From the 1930s until 1956, the No. 1243 operated on the railroad's Encampment Branch in Wyoming. That same year, the No. 1243 was retired from active service.

Following retirement, No. 1243 resided in Rawlins, Wyoming before going to Cheyenne, Wyoming. In 1990, the 1243 was cosmetically restored and transported on a flat car in a special train pull by Union Pacific No.3985 to Omaha, Nebraska, where it was placed on display at the Durham Museum in October 1996.

UP 1243 is now a static exhibit at the museum, with no plans to restore it to running condition. It currently sits inside the Trish and Dick Davidson Gallery exhibit, along with a variety of other railroad equipment.
