= Gilbert Stanley Underwood =

American architect

- Born: June 5, 1890; Oneida, New York, U.S.
- Died: August 3, 1961 (aged 71); Florida, U.S.
- Education: Yale University (B.A. 1920); Harvard University (M.A. 1923)
- Known for: Lodges within national parks of the United States
- Spouse: Mary Elizabeth Smith (m. 1914)

Gilbert Stanley Underwood (June 5, 1890 – August 3, 1961) was an American architect best known for designing lodges within national parks of the United States, multiple of which are listed on the National Register of Historic Places.

== Biography ==
Born in 1890 in New York state, Underwood received his B.A. from Yale in 1920 and a M.A. from Harvard in 1923. After opening an office in Los Angeles that year, he became associated with Daniel Ray Hull, a landscape architect of the National Park Service. This led to a commission with the Utah Parks Company of the Union Pacific Railroad, which was developing the parks in hopes of producing destinations for travelers. During this time, Underwood designed lodges for Cedar Breaks National Monument (now demolished), Zion National Park, Bryce Canyon National Park, and Grand Canyon National Park.

Underwood's surviving Utah Parks Company buildings are considered exceptional examples of the Rustic style of architecture, and are all listed on the National Register of Historic Places. In addition, Underwood was contracted to design Yosemite National Park's Ahwahnee Hotel, also on the National Register and probably his greatest triumph in the Rustic style.

Underwood also designed railway stations for the Union Pacific, culminating in the magnificent Art Deco style station in Omaha in 1931. In 1932, Underwood joined the Federal Architects Project. While working for the federal government, Underwood produced the preliminary designs for the Timberline Lodge of Mount Hood, Oregon, and went on to design more than 20 post offices, two major federal buildings, and the Harry S Truman Building (headquarters of the U.S. Department of State). From 1947 to 1949, Underwood was appointed as federal supervisory architect.

Utilizing an association with John D. Rockefeller Jr. and the Williamsburg Lodge project in Virginia, Underwood designed as his last major commission the Jackson Lake Lodge (1950–1954) in Grand Teton National Park, Wyoming. Underwood retired to Fort Lauderdale, Florida, in 1954, and died in Florida in 1961, aged 71.

== Works ==
- Cedar Breaks Lodge, Cedar Breaks National Monument – completed 1924, demolished 1972
- Bryce Canyon Lodge, Bryce Canyon National Park – completed 1925
- Union Pacific Dining Lodge, West Yellowstone, MT, 1925
- The Ahwahnee, Yosemite National Park – completed 1926
- Union Pacific Railroad depot, South Torrington, Wyoming, 1926
- Zion Lodge – completed 1927, burned 1966, rebuilt (different style, then restored to original appearance in the 1990s)
- Union Pacific Railroad Great Overland Station, 701 N Kansas Avenue, Topeka, Kansas, 1927
- Union Pacific Railroad depot, Lund, Utah, 1927, demolished 1970
- Wilshire Tower (Desmond's and Silverwoods department stores), 5500–5514 Wilshire Boulevard, Los Angeles, California – completed 1929
- Union Pacific Railroad depot, North Second and Broadway, Abilene, Kansas, 1929
- Union Pacific Railroad Depot, Marysville, Kansas, 1929
- Union Pacific Railroad Depot, Main and 10th Streets, Gering, Nebraska, 1929
- Union Pacific Railroad Depot, 304 North Rail Street, Shoshone, Idaho, 1929
- Union Pacific Railroad depot, 7th Avenue between 8th and 10th Streets, Greeley, Colorado, 1930
- Union Station, 801 South 10th Street, Omaha, Nebraska completed 1931 (now housing the Durham Western Heritage Museum)
- Grand Canyon Lodge (North Rim) – completed 1928, burned 1932, rebuilt 1936–37 (modified style, same footprint), burned 2025
- the Lodge at Sun Valley, Idaho – completed 1936
- U.S. Post Office, Beacon, New York (with Charles Rosen) – completed 1937
- The new San Francisco Mint in San Francisco, California – completed 1937
- the United States Court House in Los Angeles, California – completed 1940
- the United States Court House in Seattle, Washington – completed 1940
- Rincon Center Post Office in San Francisco, CA – completed 1940
- Jackson Lake Lodge, Grand Teton National Park, Wyoming – completed 1954

== Gallery ==
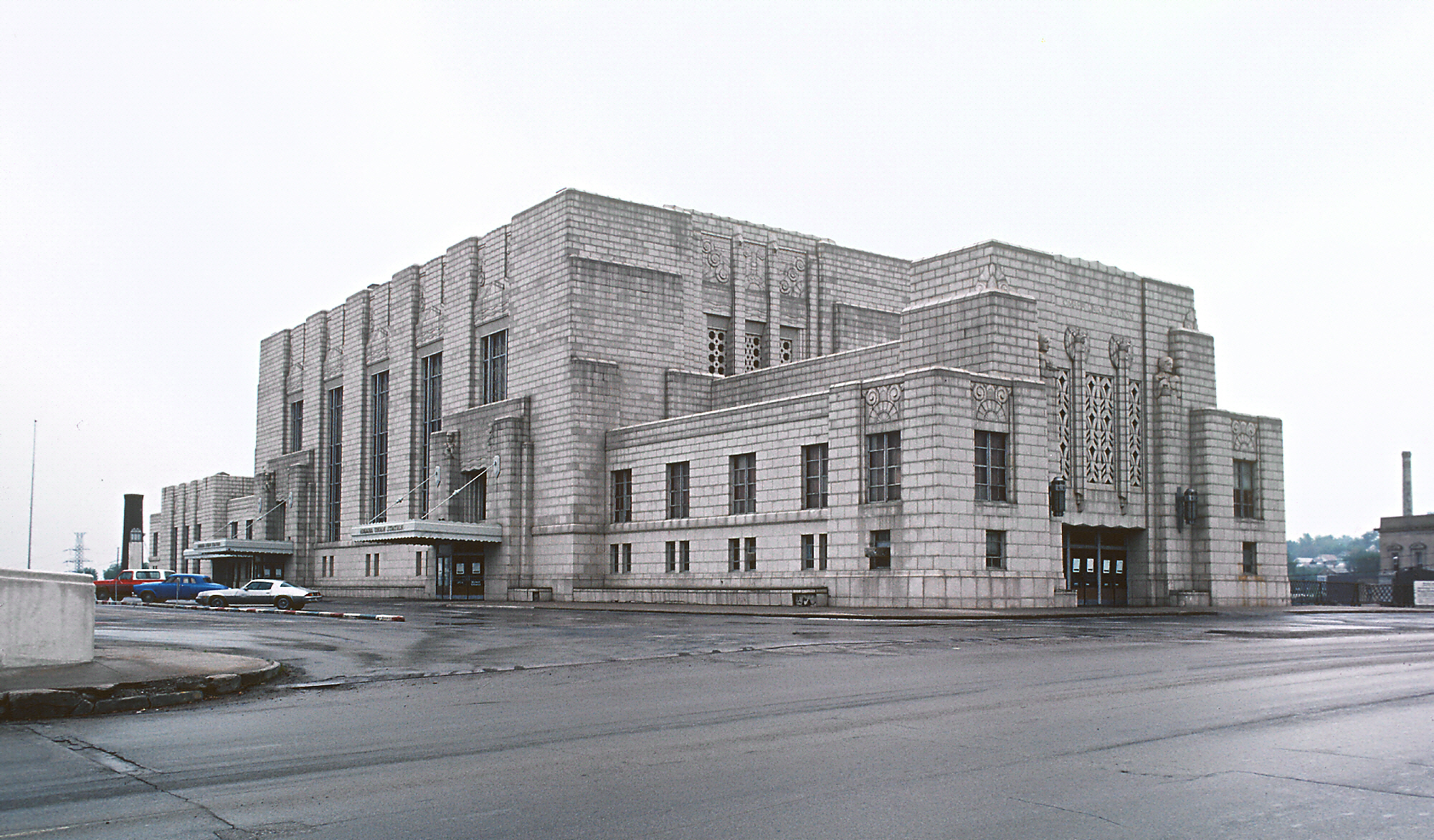
Omaha Union Station

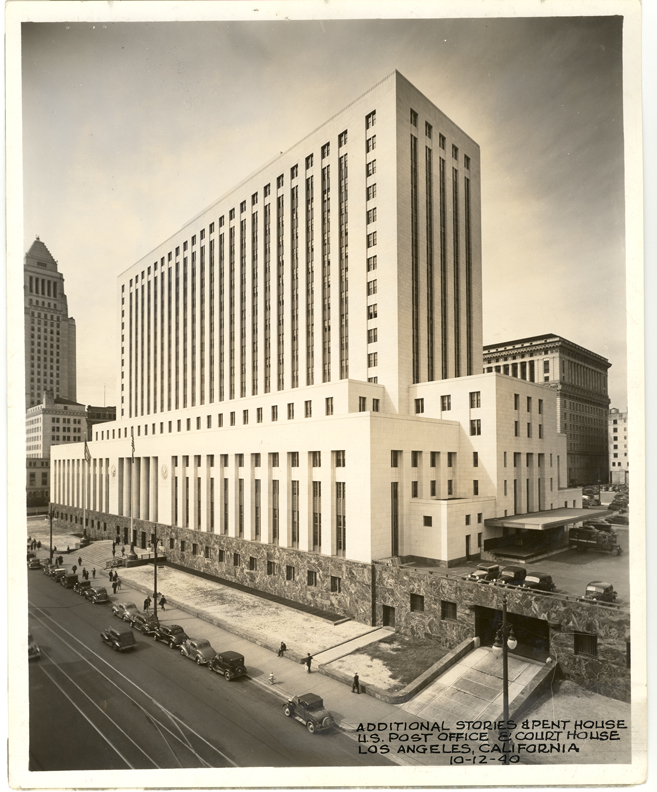
United States Court House, Los Angeles

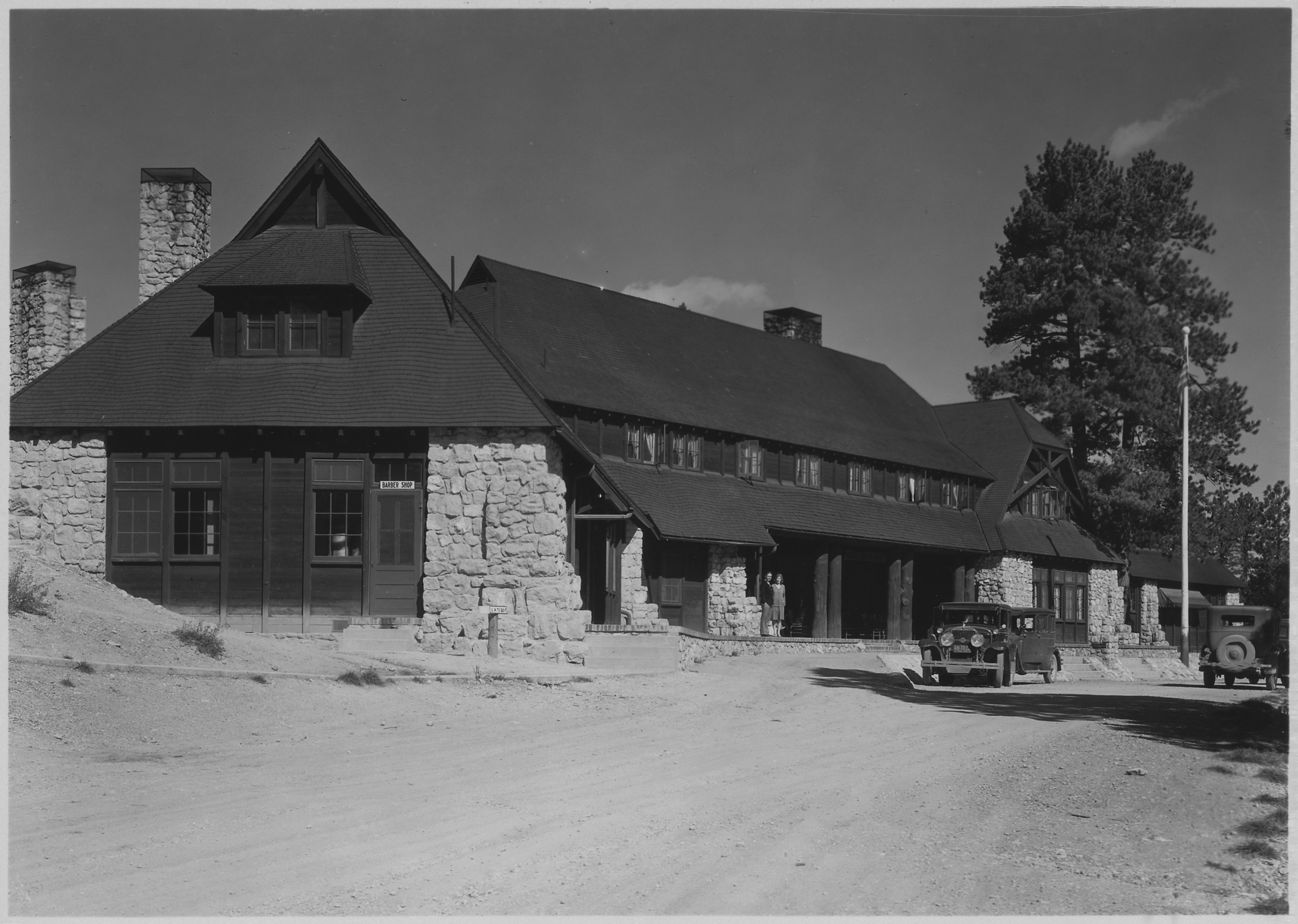
Bryce Canyon Lodge

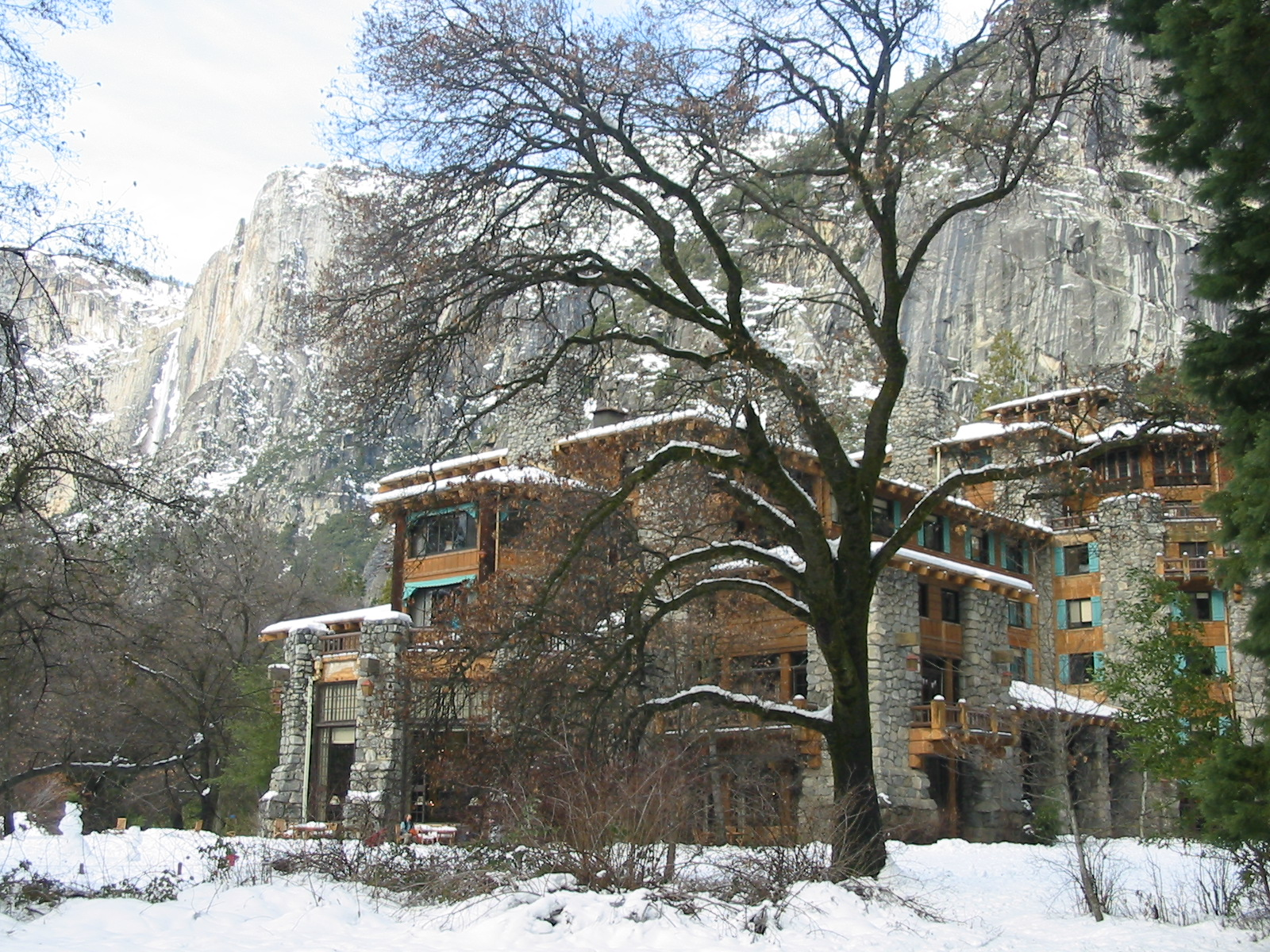
Ahwahnee Hotel

== See also ==
- National Park Service rustic
- Gilbert Stanley Underwood buildings index
