= Omaha Union Station =

- Union Passenger Terminal
- U.S. National Register of Historic Places
- U.S. National Historic Landmark
- U.S. Historic district – Contributing property
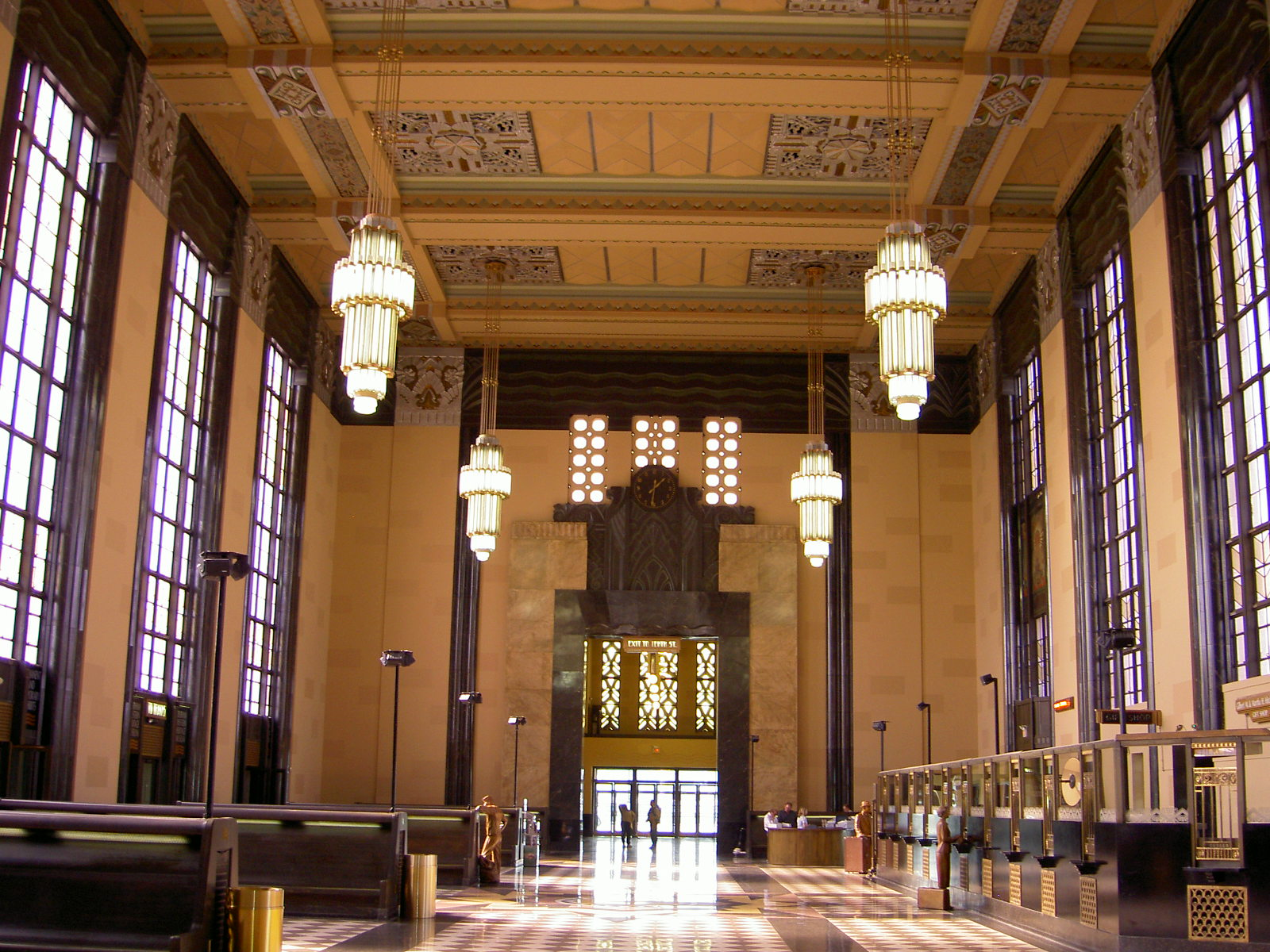
- Interior

- Location within Nebraska
- Interactive map showing the location for Omaha Union Station
- Location: 801 South 10th Street; Omaha, Nebraska
- Coordinates: 41°15′5.5″N 95°55′41.8″W
- Built: 1931
- Architect: Gilbert Stanley Underwood
- Architectural style: Art Deco
- Part of: Omaha Rail and Commerce Historic District (ID96000769)
- NRHP reference No.: 71000484

Significant dates
- Added to NRHP: November 12, 1971
- Designated NHL: December 23, 2016
- Designated CP: July 19, 1996

The Union Station, at 801 South 10th Street in Omaha, Nebraska, known also as Union Passenger Terminal, is "one of the finest examples of Art Deco architecture in the Midwest". Designated an Omaha Landmark in 1978, it was listed as "Union Passenger Terminal" on the National Register of Historic Places in 1971, and was designated a National Historic Landmark in 2016. The Union Station is also a contributing property to the Omaha Rail and Commerce Historic District. It was the Union Pacific's first Art Deco railroad station, and the completion of the terminal "firmly established Omaha as an important railroad terminus in the Midwest".

== History ==
The second depot was designed by Chicago architect Charles Sumner Frost, and construction began in October, 1898. Completed on December 1, 1899 at a cost of $405,782, the building's façade rose 60 feet (18 m) above the Tenth Street Viaduct the building faced. It was primarily built from pressed brick made in Omaha, as well as Bedford stone used in the architectural details. A canopy of glass and iron protected passengers from the elements as they entered the station.

=== Current structure ===
We have tried to express the distinctive character of the railroad: strength, power, masculinity.

— Omaha Union Station Architect Gilbert Stanley Underwood

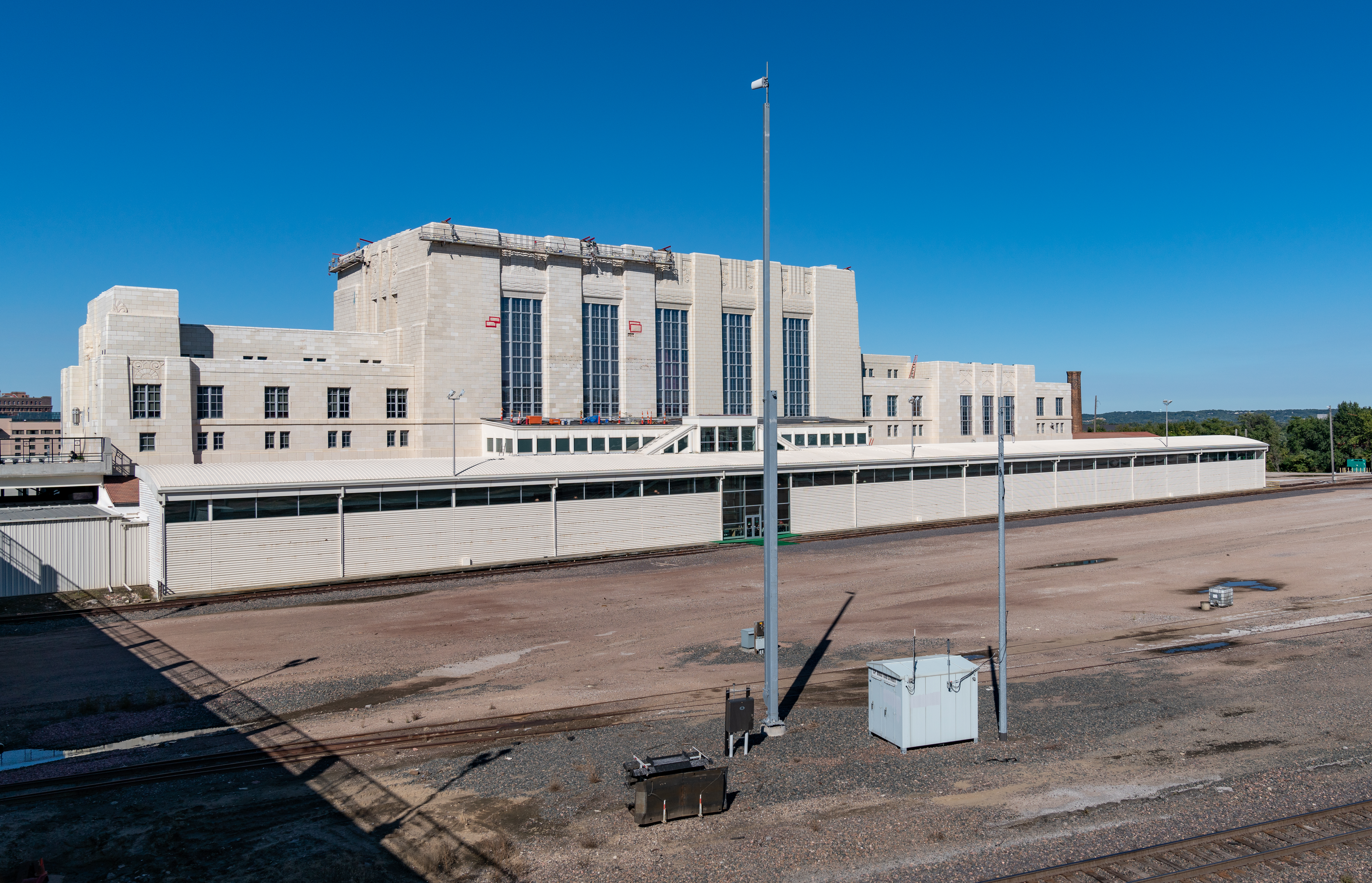
Trackside of Union Station in 2018

Designed by Gilbert Stanley Underwood of Los Angeles, the current building features a steel frame structure that is clad with cream-colored glazed terra cotta. Groundbreaking occurred on July 29, 1929, and the building was completed on January 15, 1931. The 124,000-square-foot (11,500 m^{2}) cost $3.5 million to build. Of the building's design, Underwood was said to have remarked, "We have tried to express the distinctive character of the railroad: strength, power, masculinity." At its dedication, Carl R. Gray, president of the Union Pacific, declared the station to be, "Dedicated by the railways of Omaha to serve, comfort and convenience of the people."

The construction of the station was preceded by the construction of the Burlington Train Station one block away. Within ten years that station was served by seven railroads. Upon its completion, the Union Station became renowned for its technological innovations, including electric luggage conveyor belts, escalators and extensive lighting throughout the building. Simultaneously, patrons and critics alike appreciated the traditional and lavish attributes of the building, including massive women's restrooms, beautiful marble columns and flooring throughout, and deep oak woodwork surrounding every window and door in the station. During its first year, 1.5 million passengers passed through.

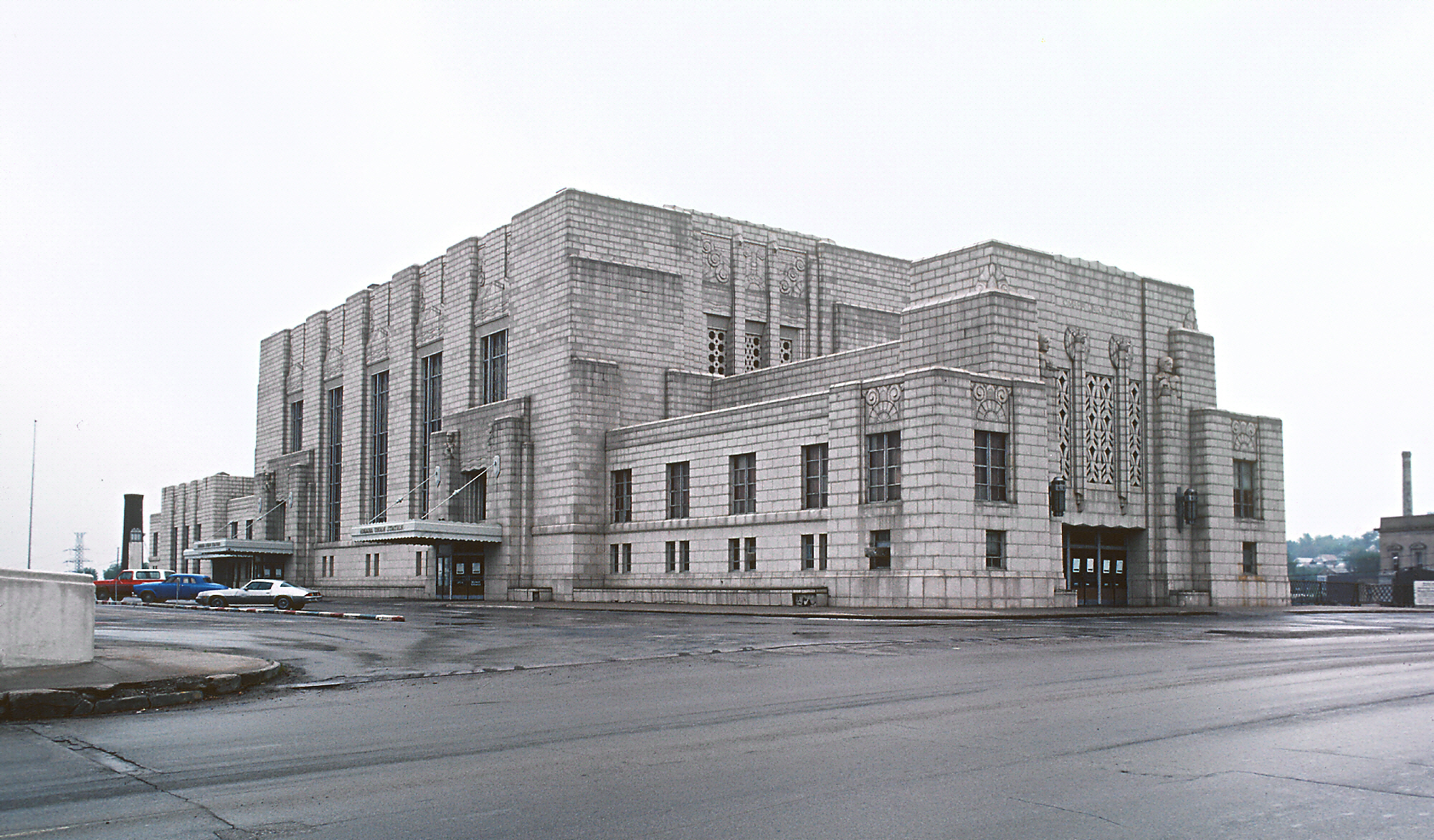
Omaha Union Station in 1980

By 1946, 64 steam locomotives were in operation bringing 10,000 passengers daily in and out of the Union Station. However, within a decade everything changed. In 1956 the Chicago and North Western Railroad stopped its line running through Omaha. 1960 saw the exit of Wabash Railroad. In 1965 the Missouri Pacific Railroad and the Chicago Great Western Railway quit running, followed by the Rock Island Railroad in 1969. Passenger service ceased in 1971, and the Union Station was donated to the City of Omaha by the Union Pacific Railroad in 1973.

That year the station quickly became the home of the Durham Museum. The Union Pacific Museum and Archives were also located there. In 1997 the Union Station underwent a renovation that included a 22,000-square-foot (2,000 m^{2}) addition and new climate controls for the museum, and today the building is a contributing property to the Omaha Rail and Commerce Historic District, bordering the Old Market Historic District and Omaha's Little Italy.

== See also ==
- Omaha Amtrak Station
- History of Omaha
- Landmarks in Omaha
- Council Bluffs Transfer Depot

== Bibliography ==
- (1973) Historical Architecture of Omaha by Henry W. Wong.
- (2001) Union Pacific and Omaha Union Station by Carla Johnson.
- (1999) Omaha railroad Stations by John Peterson.

| Preceding station | Chicago and North Western Railway | Following station |
|---|---|---|
| Terminus | Main Line | Council Bluffs Transfer toward Chicago |
| Irvington toward Lander | Fremont, Elkhorn and Missouri Valley Railroad; Main Line | Terminus |
| Terminus | Omaha – Minneapolis | Council Bluffs Transfer toward Minneapolis |
| Preceding station | Chicago, Rock Island and Pacific Railroad | Following station |
| Albright toward Colorado Springs | Main Line | Council Bluffs toward Chicago |
| Preceding station | Illinois Central Railroad | Following station |
| Terminus | Omaha – Fort Dodge Passenger service ended in 1939 | Council Bluffs toward Fort Dodge |
| Preceding station | Milwaukee Road | Following station |
| Terminus | Omaha – Chicago | Council Bluffs Transfer toward Chicago |
| Preceding station | Missouri Pacific Railroad | Following station |
| Terminus | Omaha – Kansas City | Fort Crook toward Kansas City |
| Preceding station | Union Pacific Railroad | Following station |
| Lane toward Ogden | Overland Route | Council Bluffs Transfer Terminus |
| South Omaha toward Lane | Papillion Branch | Terminus |
| Preceding station | Wabash Railroad | Following station |
| Terminus | Omaha – St. Louis | Council Bluffs toward St. Louis |
