= Utahn (train) =

American passenger train

Overview
- Service type: Inter-city rail
- Locale: Western United States
- First service: May 14, 1947
- Last service: April 29, 1951
- Former operator: Union Pacific Railroad

Route
- Termini: Cheyenne, Wyoming; Los Angeles, California
- Train numbers: 3 (Cheyenne - Los Angeles); 4 (Los Angeles - Cheyenne)
- Line used: Overland Route

On-board services
- Seating arrangements: Reclining seat coaches
- Sleeping arrangements: Sleeping car
- Catering facilities: Dining car

Technical
- Track gauge: 4 ft 8 1/2 in (1,435 mm)

The Utahn was a short-lived named passenger train operated by the Union Pacific Railroad between Cheyenne, Wyoming and Los Angeles, California that ran from 1947 to 1951. The train was unique due to its mixed-up variety of UP motive power.

== History ==
When the City of St. Louis started service on June 2, 1946 between St. Louis and Cheyenne, its passengers continuing westward from Cheyenne needed to connect with other trains. As a result, the Utahn entered service on May 14, 1947 to provide connecting service to Los Angeles for the City of St. Louis. The Utahn replaced unnamed trains 43 and 44, which had run between Omaha and Los Angeles since June 2, 1946.

The Utahn did not last long in service, as beginning in the 1950s the UP was doing a major reconstruction of its passenger train fleet. The City of St. Louis was extended all the way to Los Angeles, and the Utahn made its last run on April 29, 1951.

== Consist ==
While in service, the train boasted a wide variety of power such as FEF 4-8-4 Northern steam locomotives, ALCO's PA-1, EMD F3's, and Fairbanks-Morse Erie-builts.

The train ran with as many as 29 cars, which is long for a passenger train. Many of these cars were head-end equipment such as express reefers cars, baggage cars, and Railway Post Offices for different destinations. Two coaches, a diner, a club-dormitory lounge car, and a heavyweight sleeper were in the set. The consist also included a few lightweight passenger cars, but the train was a mix of many different colors, ranging from "Armour Yellow" to the "Two Tone Gray" and "Olive Green" liveries.
