= Durham Museum (Omaha) =

Museum in Omaha, Nebraska, U.S.

Coordinates: 41°15′06″N 95°55′42″W

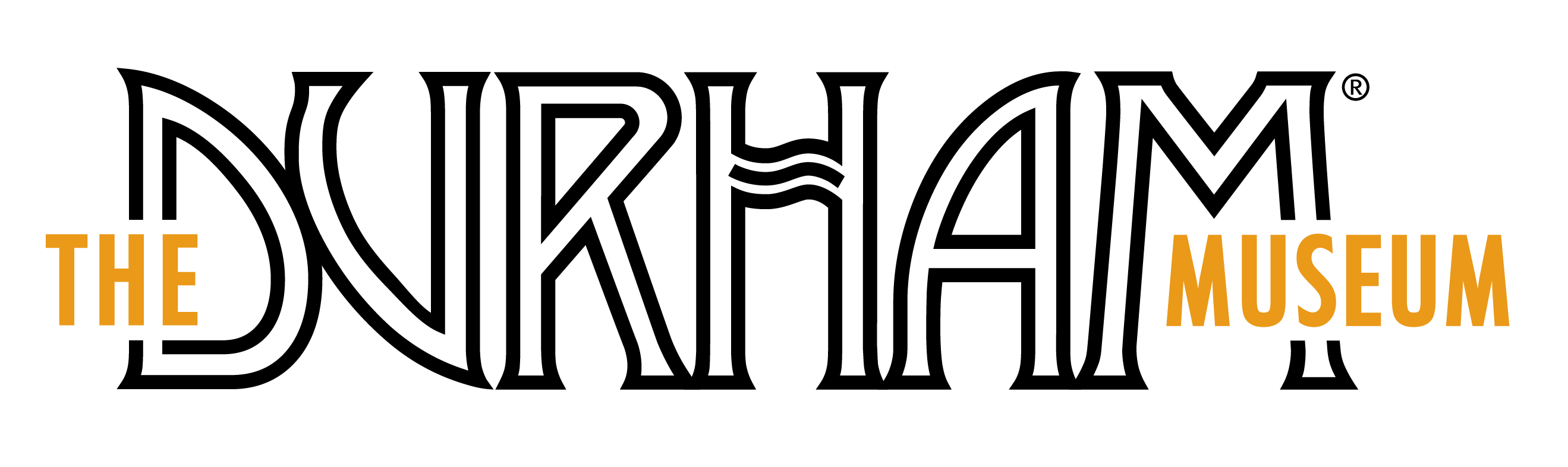

- Durham Museum, former Omaha Union Station, 2021
- Former name: Western Heritage Museum
- Established: 1975; 51 years ago
- Location: 801 S 10th St; Omaha, Nebraska, U.S.
- Type: History and Art museum
- Collection size: 48,000 objects
- Visitors: 260,480 (2023)
- Director: Christi Janssen
- Website: durhammuseum.org

The Durham Museum (formerly known as the Durham Western Heritage Museum) is located at 801 South 10th Street in Downtown Omaha, Nebraska, United States. The museum is dedicated to preserving and displaying the history of the United States' western region. The museum is housed in Omaha's former Union Station. The museum is an affiliate within the Smithsonian Affiliations program.

== History ==
In May 1971, after the establishment of the National Railroad Passenger Corporation (now Amtrak), Union Pacific Railroad closed Union Station. The first suggestion in print that the building be used as a museum appeared in the Public Pulse of the World Herald on April 5, 1971, in a letter from John Edward Peterson. He suggested that either the City of Omaha or Joslyn purchase the building and develop it into a museum. He wrote, "Maybe the Union Pacific would be willing to sell the station rather cheaply or even donate it."

The station was donated to the City of Omaha in 1973. The museum was originally founded as the Western Heritage Museum, which opened that same year. The museum closed from 1995 to 1996 for a $22 million renovation project largely funded by Charles and Margre Durham. For their contributions on the project, the Western Heritage Museum was renamed the Durham Western Heritage Museum in 1998.

On April 6, 2008, the Durham Western Heritage Museum became the Durham Museum. The change was driven by recent partnerships with Smithsonian Institution, the Library of Congress, and the National Archives which have provided the museum with a larger range of exhibits and programming not limited to western heritage.

== Byron Reed Collection ==
According to experts, "Byron Reed was one of the greatest collectors of the 19th century," with a reputation as a numismatist that is "largely unrecognized." According to Larry Wilson, a historian and numismatic researcher for the Independent Coin Grading Service, "The exhibit is an environmental museum where the visitors walk through a replication of the original Byron Reed Library. The coins are displayed in beautiful dark wooden cases that give the visitors the sense they are part of the exhibit. It gave me the feeling I was back in the 1880s sitting in Byron Reed's library examining his coins with him. The exhibit includes an abundance of historical information on Byron Reed and the times. I know visitors will be impressed with the quality of the exhibit and the magnificence of the coins displayed." Donated to the City of Omaha upon Reed's death, today the collection is housed at the Durham Museum.

== Trish and Dick Davidson Gallery ==
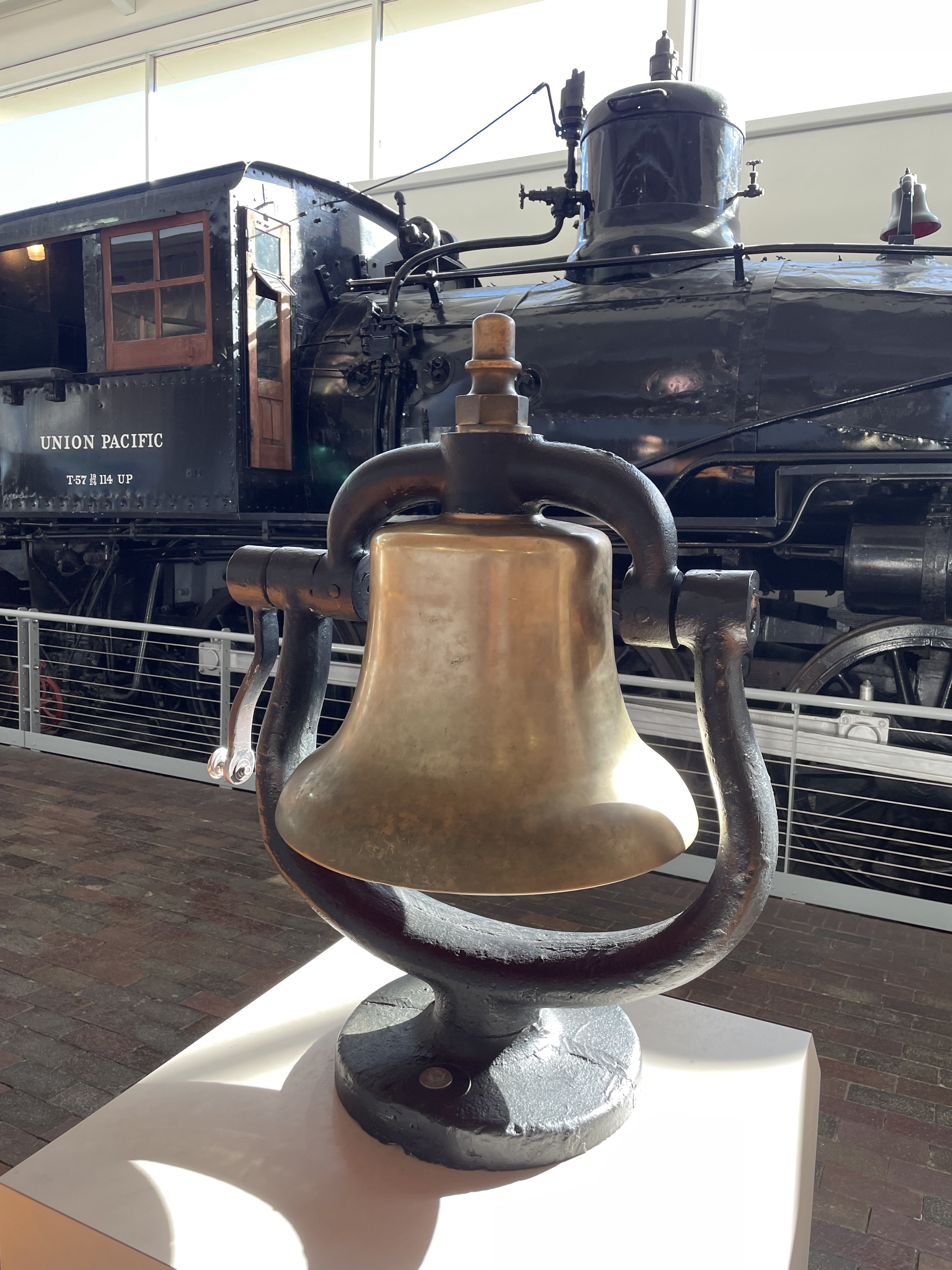
Union Pacific train and bell at the Durham Museum

The Trish and Dick Davidson Gallery, located at track level, has a variety of transportation and commerce exhibits. Bekins Moving & Storage restored 1922 Mack flatbed truck and wall displays tell the story of one of Omaha's great companies. Buffett Grocery Store replica store front of the original Buffett Grocery Store that opened in 1915. O Scale Model Train has layout with a depot and diorama that represents Union Pacific's double track main line from Omaha to Ogden, Utah, during the 1950s.

The following train cars and locomotives are on display:

- Union Pacific 1243 Steam Locomotive (c1890)
- Union Pacific 25559 Caboose (1962)
- Union Pacific 1202 Pullman Sleeper “National Command” (1956)
- Southern Pacific 2986 Lounge Car (1949)
- Pullman Observation Car “Cornhusker Club” (1924)
- Omaha and Council Bluffs Railway and Bridge Company Streetcar
- An authentic streetcar that took people through the neighborhoods of Omaha during the 1940s.

== See also ==
- History of Omaha
- Omaha Union Station
- List of museums in Nebraska
