= San Francisco Zephyr =

Amtrak passenger train in the U.S.

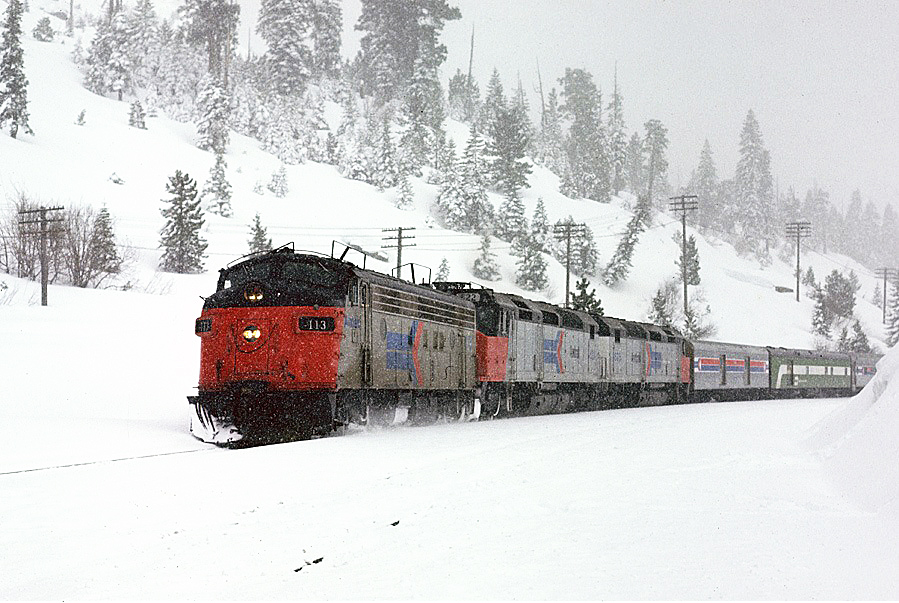
- An EMD FP7 and two EMD SDP40Fs pull the eastward San Francisco Zephyr through the Sierra in 1975

Overview
- Service type: Inter-city rail
- Status: Discontinued
- Locale: Western United States
- Predecessor: City of San Francisco/Denver Zephyr
- First service: June 11, 1972
- Last service: July 15, 1983
- Successor: California Zephyr
- Former operator(s): Amtrak

Route
- Termini: Chicago, Illinois; Oakland, California
- Stops: 36
- Distance travelled: 2,390 miles (3,850 km)
- Train number(s): 5, 6

Technical
- Track gauge: 4 ft 8 1/2 in (1,435 mm)

The San Francisco Zephyr was an Amtrak passenger train that ran between Chicago and Oakland from June 1972 to July 1983, when it was renamed to the California Zephyr.

== History ==
From the start of Amtrak in spring 1971 until summer 1972, Amtrak service between Chicago and Oakland was provided by two trains: the Denver Zephyr, which operated daily between Chicago and Denver, and the City of San Francisco, which operated thrice-weekly between Denver and Oakland. After several false starts, Amtrak consolidated the two trains into one, the San Francisco Zephyr, paying homage to the California Zephyr and The City of San Francisco.

Because of the refusal of the Denver and Rio Grande Western Railroad to join Amtrak in 1971 and its decision to maintain its Rio Grande Zephyr between Denver and Ogden, Utah, the San Francisco Zephyr used the Union Pacific's Overland Route between Denver and Ogden. The San Francisco Zephyr and the Rio Grande Zephyr were scheduled as to facilitate a connection between them in Ogden (but not Denver).

The San Francisco Zephyr traveled over rails owned and operated by three railroads: the Burlington Northern between Chicago and Denver, the Union Pacific between Denver and Ogden, and the Southern Pacific between Ogden and Oakland.

In July 1980, the San Francisco Zephyr was outfitted with Amtrak's new bi-level Superliner passenger cars – one of the last western trains to receive them – and began exchanging through cars at Ogden with the Seattle–Chicago Pioneer and the Los Angeles–Chicago Desert Wind. Between Ogden and Chicago, the Zephyr, Desert Wind, and Pioneer operated as a combined train.

In 1983, the D&RGW chose to join Amtrak, citing increasing losses in passenger operations. Amtrak re-routed the San Francisco Zephyr over the D&RGW's line between Denver and Salt Lake City, which was its original preference in 1971. The change was scheduled for April 25, but a mudslide at Thistle, Utah, closed the D&RGW's main line and delayed the change until July 16. With the change of route, Amtrak renamed the train California Zephyr.

== In media ==
In an episode of the British program Great Railway Journeys, broadcast in 1980, the presenter Ludovic Kennedy travels from New York to Los Angeles by rail, riding on the San Francisco Zephyr between Chicago and Oakland.
