= Pioneer (train) =

Former Amtrak train between Seattle and Chicago

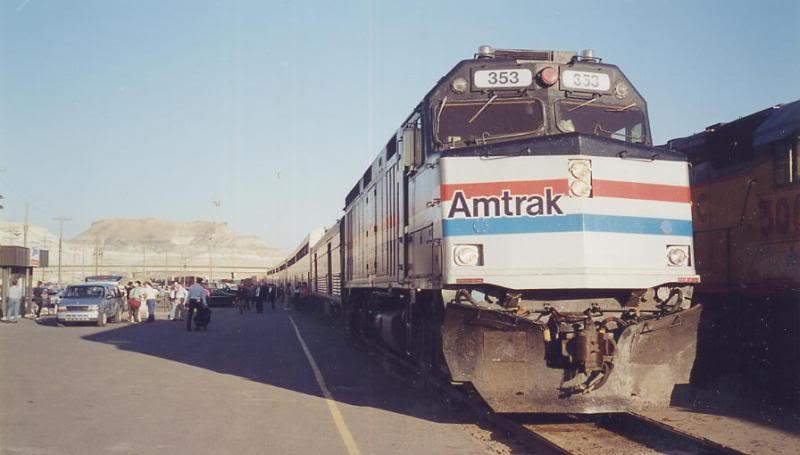
- The final Pioneer at Green River, Wyoming on May 10, 1997

Overview
- Service type: Inter-city rail
- Status: Discontinued
- Locale: Western United States
- First service: June 7, 1977
- Last service: May 10, 1997
- Former operator: Amtrak

Route
- Termini: Seattle, Washington List: UP Depot, Salt Lake City, Utah (1977-1986); Chicago, Illinois (1986-1997)
- Distance travelled: 2,662 miles (4,284 km)
- Service frequency: Thrice weekly
- Train number: 25/26

On-board services
- Classes: First class (sleepers); Reserved coach
- Sleeping arrangements: Bedrooms; Roomettes
- Catering facilities: Dining car; On-board cafe
- Observation facilities: Sightseer lounge

Technical
- Rolling stock: Superliners
- Track gauge: 4 ft 8 1/2 in (1,435 mm)

The Pioneer was an Amtrak long-distance passenger train that ran between Seattle and Chicago via Portland, Boise, Salt Lake City, and Denver. Operating from 1977 to 1997, the Pioneer was the last passenger rail route to serve Wyoming, Southern Idaho, or Eastern Oregon.

Rail advocates have been pushing for restoration of the Pioneer, though in 2021 Amtrak omitted the route from its 15-year expansion vision.

== History ==
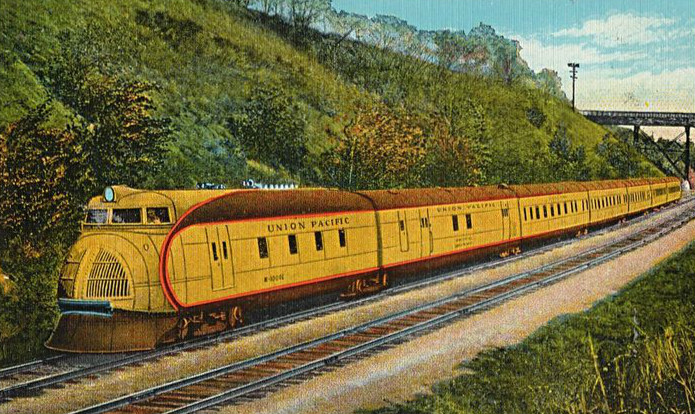
Postcard depiction of the M-10001 trainset in 1939.

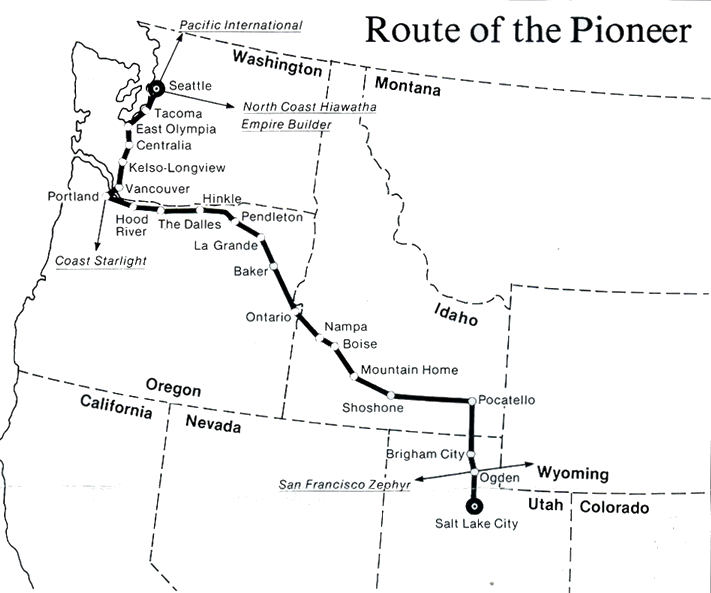
1977 map of the Pioneer route

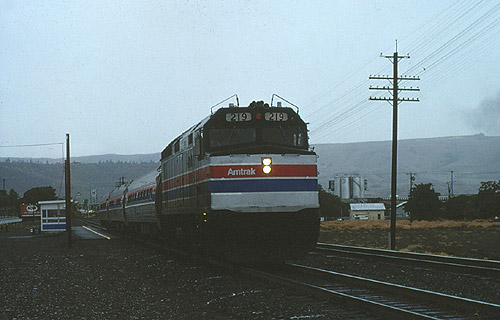
The Pioneer at The Dalles in August 1977

In the 1960s, prior to the creation of Amtrak, two Union Pacific Railroad streamliners provided service to Portland via Boise: the City of Portland (from Chicago) and the Portland Rose (from Kansas City). Amtrak did not retain either train in 1971—preferring the Empire Builder for Chicago–Pacific Northwest service—with the result that train travel between the Pacific Northwest and Denver required either going west to California or east to Chicago.

Amtrak sought to fill this gap in 1977 with the introduction of the Pioneer between Seattle and Salt Lake City. The all-coach train operated on a daily 24-hour schedule with connections available in Ogden, Utah with the Chicago–San Francisco San Francisco Zephyr. Meal service was provided in an on-board cafe, one of the then-new Amfleet dinettes. Coaches were reserved except between Portland and Seattle, where the Pioneer supplemented existing corridor service. In early 1977, Amtrak authorized approximately $500,000 to improve 13 stations along the route in Utah, Idaho, and Oregon. Work included installation of passenger shelters, platforms and rehabilitation of existing stations. Regular service began on June 7.

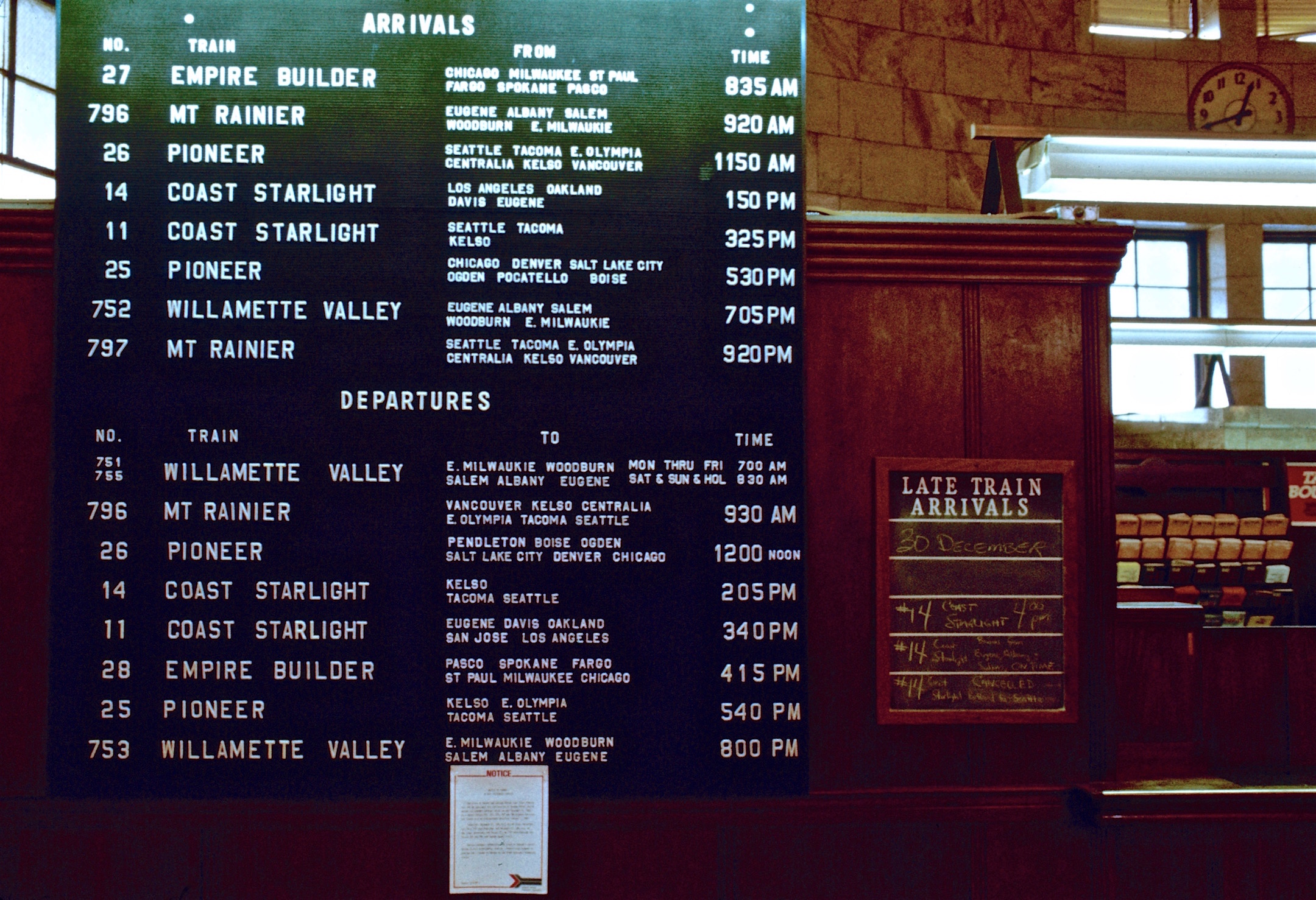
The arrivals and departures board inside Portland Union Station in 1981, listing the Pioneer, among other trains

The Pioneer began exchanging a Seattle–Chicago through coach with the San Francisco Zephyr on April 26, 1981; this was supplemented by a through sleeping car on October 31, 1982. When the Denver and Rio Grande Western Railroad decided to join Amtrak in 1983, Amtrak renamed the San Francisco Zephyr to California Zephyr, shifted it south to the Moffat Tunnel Route, and changed its interchange point with the Pioneer from Ogden to Salt Lake City, the Pioneer's terminus.

On June 17, 1991, the Pioneer's terminus and California Zephyr interchange point was moved from Salt Lake City to Denver, its route was changed to use the Union Pacific's Overland Route in Wyoming (which had last seen service in 1983), and a bus was added between Salt Lake City and the Pioneer at Ogden. This change was made for two reasons:

- The combined California Zephyr/Desert Wind/Pioneer consisted of 16 Superliner cars, the longest such train Amtrak had ever operated. Amtrak required at least four EMD F40PH locomotives to haul this behemoth between Chicago and the Moffat Tunnel Route between Denver and Salt Lake City. Splitting the Pioneer in Denver reduced the load along this segment.
- The faster running time over the Overland Route allowed a more reasonable departure time from Seattle.

The Pioneer was reduced to thrice-weekly on November 4, 1993.

=== Final months and demise ===
In January 1997, Amtrak announced that the Pioneer would end May 10, 1997, when a Congressionally-funded mandate to keep it operating expired. States affected were given until March 15 to submit funding proposals to keep the train operating. While visiting Pendleton, Oregon on February 22, Amtrak President Thomas M. Downs said the Pioneer could be converted to a coach-only Chicago–Portland mail-and-express train operating on an all-Union Pacific routing through Iowa and Wyoming (but missing Ogden) if interested states could provide about $4.8 million to fund the existing operation through that October when the new train could start.

By the March 15 deadline, state funding had not been secured even though the requested funding package had been reduced. Instead of seeking $4.8 million, Amtrak asked the Oregon legislature for $2.9 million in loan guarantees, which would have resulted in triweekly service between Portland and Salt Lake City through the October startup of a daily mixed train carrying express freight and passengers between Chicago and Portland via Omaha, Cheyenne, and Ogden. Oregon refused to provide the loan guarantees because it found Amtrak's collateral (ex-Santa Fe Hi-Level cars) unacceptable. On April 10, Union Pacific told Amtrak that the proposed express train would require $56 million in capital improvements. On May 10, 1997, the Pioneer made its last run, as did the Desert Wind. It was reported in the December 1998 issue of Trains that a Chicago–Portland replacement for the Pioneer via Omaha and Cheyenne had been postponed.

The end of the Pioneer severed Wyoming from the national rail network, and also spelled the end of intercity rail service in the more populated portions of Idaho. To maintain service levels in the Seattle–Portland corridor, Amtrak instituted an additional corridor train between the two cities.

== Equipment ==
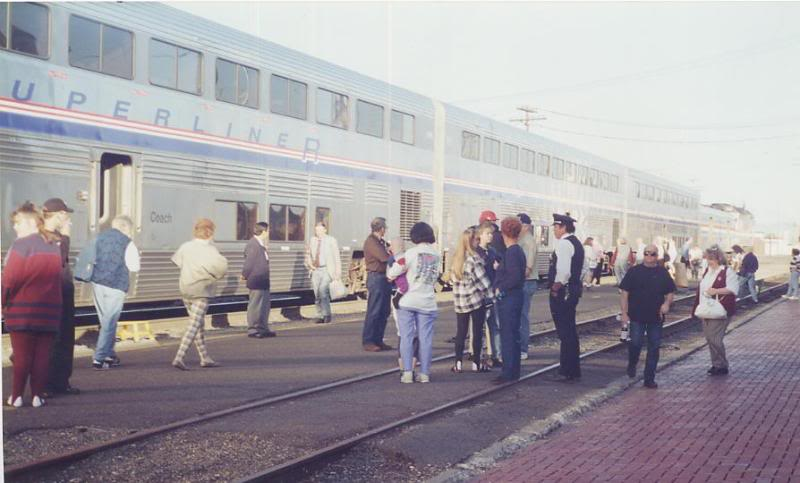
Superliner cars on the Pioneer in 1997

The original all-coach Pioneer had Amfleet coaches and a lounge. Amtrak added a Heritage Fleet sleeping car in 1978. With the start of through service with the San Francisco Zephyr in 1981 the Pioneer received bi-level Superliner coaches, but the single-level sleeping car and lounge remained until 1982, when the train went all-Superliner.

== Proposed restoration ==
Supporters have advocated for the return of the Pioneer ever since its cancellation. In 2009, Senator Ron Wyden of Oregon said the route "should never have been closed in the first place." Senator Mike Crapo of Idaho has also been credited as supporting the route's restoration for decades.

=== 2009 study ===
In accordance with the Passenger Rail Investment and Improvement Act of 2008 Amtrak evaluated the possibility of restoring service to the Pioneer and other discontinued long-distance routes. Amtrak considered four options for a restored Pioneer, all of which would have through service to Chicago via the California Zephyr:

Endpoints		Route	Estimated ridership	Revenues	Operating costs	Operating loss	Farebox recovery	Capital costs
Salt Lake City	Seattle	Rio Grande Route	102,000	$11.6m	$36.6m	$25.0m	31.7%	$373.9m
Denver	Seattle	Overland Route	111,000	$13.1m	$46.2m	$33.1m	28.4%	$469.8m
Salt Lake City	Portland	Rio Grande Route	82,000	$7.6m	$35.9m	$28.3m	21.2%	$370.5m
Denver	Portland	Overland Route	95,000	$9.2m	$44.7m	$35.5m	20.6%	$484.8m

According to the study, the projected farebox recovery ratio was "significantly lower than the average fare box recovery for Amtrak long distance trains in FY2008 (51.8%). Fare box recovery for the two Seattle options (Options 1 and 2) is lower than all but one of Amtrak's 15 existing long distance routes, and the Portland options have a lower fare box recovery than any Amtrak long distance route." Amtrak projected lower ridership than in the mid-1990s owing to the proliferation of low-cost air travel between Seattle and Salt Lake City (particularly Southwest Airlines)

=== Efforts in the 2020s ===
In 2020, local rail advocates started an informal Greater Northwest Passenger Rail Working Group focused on restarting the Pioneer, North Coast Hiawatha, and other routes in the Northwestern United States. Partner organizations include the Rail Passengers Association and Transportation for America. The group calls on Congress to give it official status, create an interstate passenger rail commission, and allocate a percentage of new train funding to rural long-distance routes. This approach is modeled on the Gulf Coast Working Group and Southern Rail Commission, which are on track to restore Amtrak service between New Orleans and Mobile in 2022. On June 8, 2021, the Boise City Council passed a resolution in support of restoring the Pioneer, using similar language to the working group's.

In March 2021, Amtrak released a 15-year "Amtrak Connects Us" expansion plan proposing over 30 new routes. The plan focuses on urban corridors, drawing some criticism for omitting long-distance routes, including the Pioneer. Long-distance expansion is complicated by the Passenger Rail Investment and Improvement Act of 2008—which limits Amtrak routes longer than 750 miles (1,210 km) to only those that existed in 2008—such that an Act of Congress may be required to enable full restoration of the Pioneer.

In June 2021, Senator Jon Tester of Montana added an amendment to the Surface Transportation Investment Act of 2021 which would require the Department of Transportation (not Amtrak itself) to evaluate the restoration of discontinued long-distance routes including the Pioneer. The bill passed the Senate Commerce Committee with bipartisan support, and was later rolled into President Biden's Infrastructure Investment and Jobs Act (IIJA), which was passed into law in November 2021. The report must be delivered to Congress within two years. The law also provides $2.4 billion in new funds to Amtrak's long-distance route network.

On October 28, 2022, the FRA announced the beginning of the Amtrak Daily Long-Distance Service Study as required by the IIJA. Its purpose is to evaluate the restoration and addition of discontinued and new long-distance passenger services, as well as the upgrading of tri-weekly long-distance services (the Sunset Limited and the Cardinal) to daily operation. The criteria for either restoring or creating new long-distance routes are that they connect large and small communities as part of a "regional rail network", provide economic and social well-being for rural areas, provide "enhanced connectivity" for the existing long-distance passenger trains, and reflect the support and engagement of the locals and region for restored long-distance passenger service. These criteria include the Pioneer, among other trains. The study will take place through 2023, and will engage with stakeholders, the rail companies, and communities as it "evaluates how to better connect people with long-distance rail services".

==== Boise–Salt Lake City route ====
In 2022, the IIJA enabled the Federal Railroad Administration to launch the Corridor ID Program, a system to develop new passenger rail services. Under the program, regional officials have proposed a new train route between Boise and Salt Lake City. The Pioneer was the last train service between these cities, covering the 404-mile (650 km) route in about 7.5 hours in 1991. Development of this route is additional to the full Pioneer restoration study.

== See also ==
- North Coast Hiawatha
- Desert Wind
