= Mansface Hill =

Mountain in Wyoming, United States

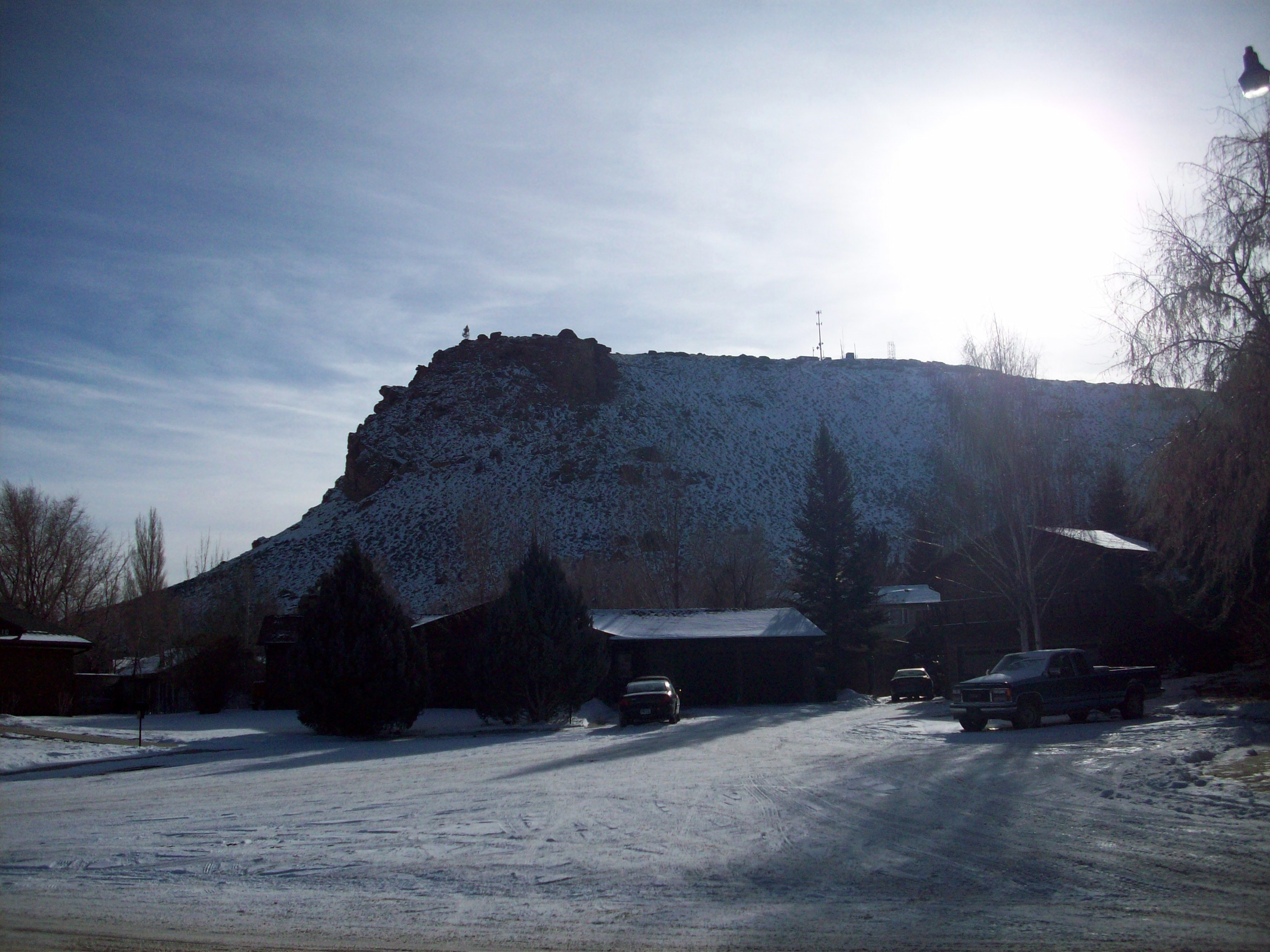
- Mansface Hill, the north face.

Highest point
- Elevation: 6,690 ft (2,040 m)
- Coordinates: 41°30′51.92″N 109°28′46.60″W

Geography
- Location: Green River, Wyoming, U.S.

Climbing
- Easiest route: Access Road

Mansface Hill is a mountain located in Green River, Wyoming. The mountain is named for its rock outcroppings, which form the shape of a face looking up into the sky.

== Access ==
Mansface is accessible from Green River via two access roads. The first road begins at the top of an area known as South Hill on Wyoming Highway 530. This route follows a pipeline for about half a mile and then begins turning north to the summit of the hill. The second begins near the west end of River View Drive in Green River. Google Earth and most GPS maps identify the road to the summit on the west side as "Knotty Pine Street." During the winter, the road is often drifted over and sometimes becomes impassable.

== Summit ==
On the summit of the hill are various radio towers for both local businesses and government entities. A tower for the city of Green River's police department is the newest tower, constructed sometime in the summer of 2004. A local cellular telephone tower is located at the center of the hill, and is primarily what can be seen from the surrounding areas. It was constructed in late 2001 and early 2002. The hill also held a tower for local KCSP affiliate radio station K232CU, which serves Green River on 94.3 FM. K232CU was moved to Wilkins Peak providing it better coverage to the region. In 2013, a tower for the state-wide "Wyolink" trunked public safety system was added to the mountain.

== Geology ==
Mansface Hill includes evidence of an ancient Lake Gosiute, which filled the area during the Eocene epoch, approximately 52-48 million years ago. Its distinctive profile is carved from the horizontal sedimentary layers of the Green River Formation, a unit renowned globally for its exceptional preservation of fossils. The Laney member of the Green River formation contains limestone and sandstone that transition into flood-plain mudstone and silt. Mansface also contains elements of the Wilkins Peak Member, saltwater lake deposits, including oil shale, evaporites (such as trona), and mudflat deposits. This member reflects a period when the ancient lake was shrinking and becoming more alkaline. The hill also contains Tower Sandstone, named by explorer John Wesley Powell. The sandstone gives the hill its rough appearance. The river, which carved the cliffs in the rocks surrounding the town, was later explored by Powell.

== Christmas tree ==
Every year in either late November or early December, several residents haul a Christmas tree to the summit. The tree is decorated and is lit at night. Power to the tree comes from the tower farm located nearby. In 2007, the tree was placed by members of the local business "The Radio Network", which owns radio stations KFRZ, KYCS, KUGR, and KZWB.

The east face with the Christmas tree, 2008

K232CU's former tower, located at the heart of the tower farm

A close-up of the Christmas tree, with deer below

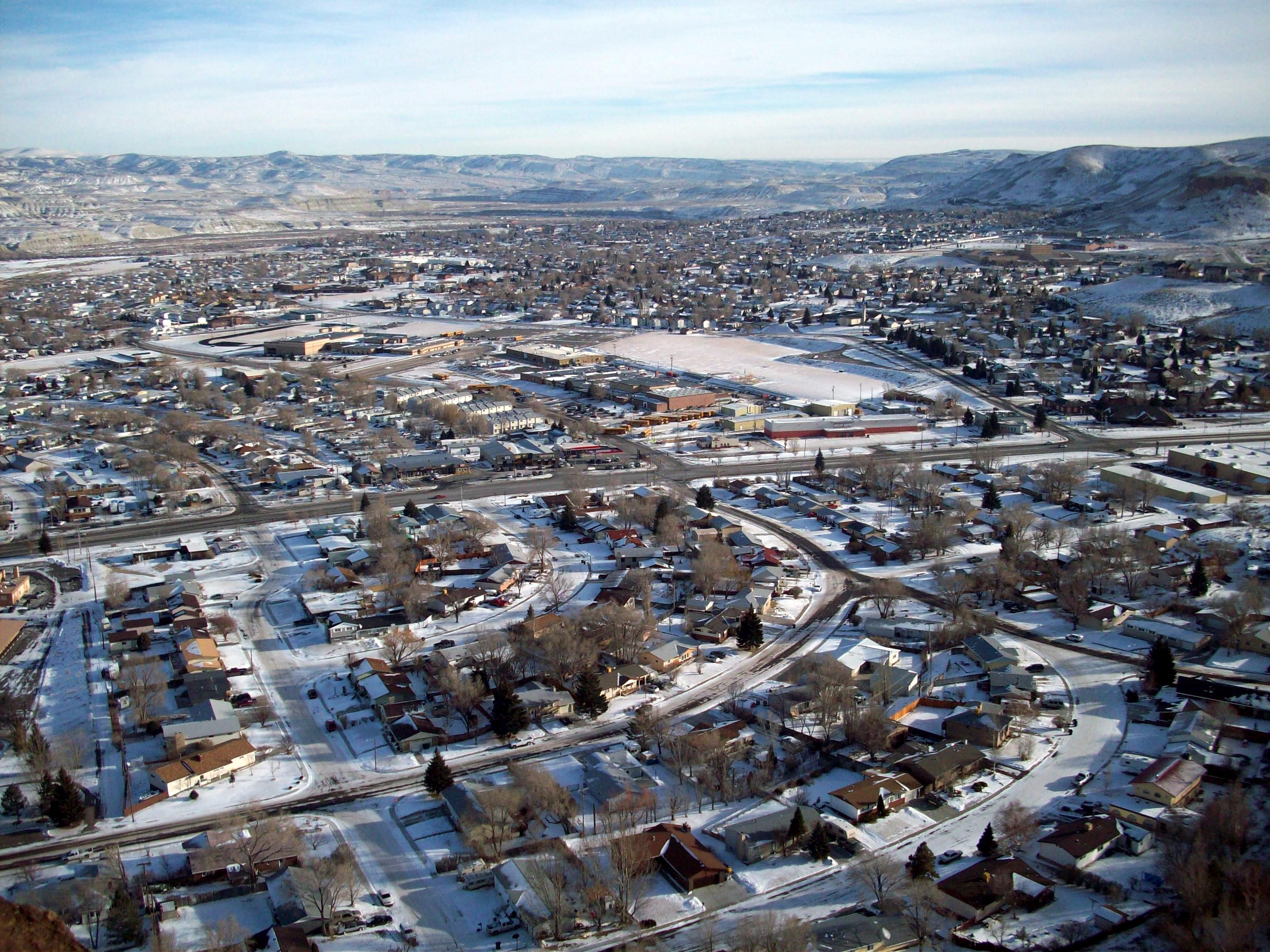
Green River, looking east from Mansface

== See also ==
- List of rock formations that resemble human beings
