= KBDY =

Radio station in Hanna, Wyoming

- Hanna, Wyoming; United States
- Frequency: 102.1 MHz

Programming
- Format: Country

Ownership
- Owner: Toga Radio LLC
- Sister stations: KTGA

History
- First air date: April 11, 2006
- Former call signs: KXMP (2006–2008)

Technical information
- Licensing authority: FCC
- Facility ID: 166000
- Class: C2
- ERP: 630 watts
- HAAT: 1,050 meters (3,440 ft)
- Transmitter coordinates: 41°38′0.9″N 106°31′32.1″W

Links
- Public license information: Public file; LMS

KBDY (102.1 FM) is a Country music radio station licensed to Hanna, Wyoming, United States. The station is owned by Toga Radio LLC.

== History ==
The station initially started out on April 11, 2006, as a construction permit owned by White Park Broadcasting. The station was known as KXMP. Still as a construction permit, the station was briefly transferred to Wagonwheel Communications, owners of KUGR, KYCS, and KFRZ for $200,000.

The sale included an unbuilt station in Wamsutter, Wyoming known as KYPT 104.3, for $50,000. What was then KYPT became KFZE 104.3, when the station was moved to Daniel. KBDY was sold to Toga Radio in 2008 for $150,000.

The station received its license to cover February 4, 2009.

It is an affiliate of the Cowboy State Daily Radio News Network.

The station's transmitter is located atop Elk Mountain. Because it is atop an 11,162 feet mountain, the station does not need to broadcast at high power to be heard far distances. It has been heard as far north as Casper Mountain, Wyoming.

Toga Radio co-owner Don Day has championed for small town radio stations across Wyoming, and stood by another company to sign on a radio station in Ralston, Wyoming.

KBDY's tower site is shared with Wyoming Public Radio's KAIW, which was moved to Elk Mountain on May 30, 2018, to improve coverage of the statewide network.
