= Peru, Wyoming =

Defunct railway stop in Wyoming, USA

General information
- Location: Near; Peru Cutoff Road and WY-374 just south of the I-80
- Coordinates: 41.549194°N 109.584889°W
- Line: Union Pacific Railroad

History
- Opened: 1868
- Closed: 1971

Former services
Preceding station	Union Pacific Railroad	Following station
Green River toward Ogden	Overland Route	Rock Springs toward Council Bluffs Transfer
Location

Peru, Wyoming (Peru Hill) is a former train stop west of Green River, Wyoming in Sweetwater County. The Peru summit elevation is approximately 6,381 feet (1,945 meters). It was served by the Union Pacific Railroad and used from 1868 till 1971. The stop was 26 miles west of the Green River station. In 1868, the Union Pacific Railroad arrived at Green River, and then Peru as part of the first transcontinental railroad. In Peru, the Union Pacific Railroad had a maintenance shop. There was a fire at the Peru station in 1887. There are no remains of the former station.

The Union Pacific Railroad used the site as a train stop, as Peru was a stagecoach stop on the Overland Trail Route, the Overland Stage Line. The site for the stagecoach stop was picked as it is at the top of the grade coming out of the Green River Valley. The top is known as Peru Hill. There is a steep, 8-mile climb for westbound trains leaving the Green River valley.

== See also ==
- Blairtown, Wyoming – Unincorporated community in Wyoming, US
- Borie station – Train station that served Cheyenne, WY, USA
- Cheyenne Depot Museum – Railroad museum in Cheyenne, Wyoming, US
- Evanston Depot
- Overland Route (Union Pacific Railroad) – Railway section in the central and western United States
- Wyoming historical monuments and markers – Historic Commissions in Wyoming, United States
