= Downtown Rock Springs Historic District =

Historic district in Wyoming, United States

- U.S. National Register of Historic Places
- U.S. Historic district
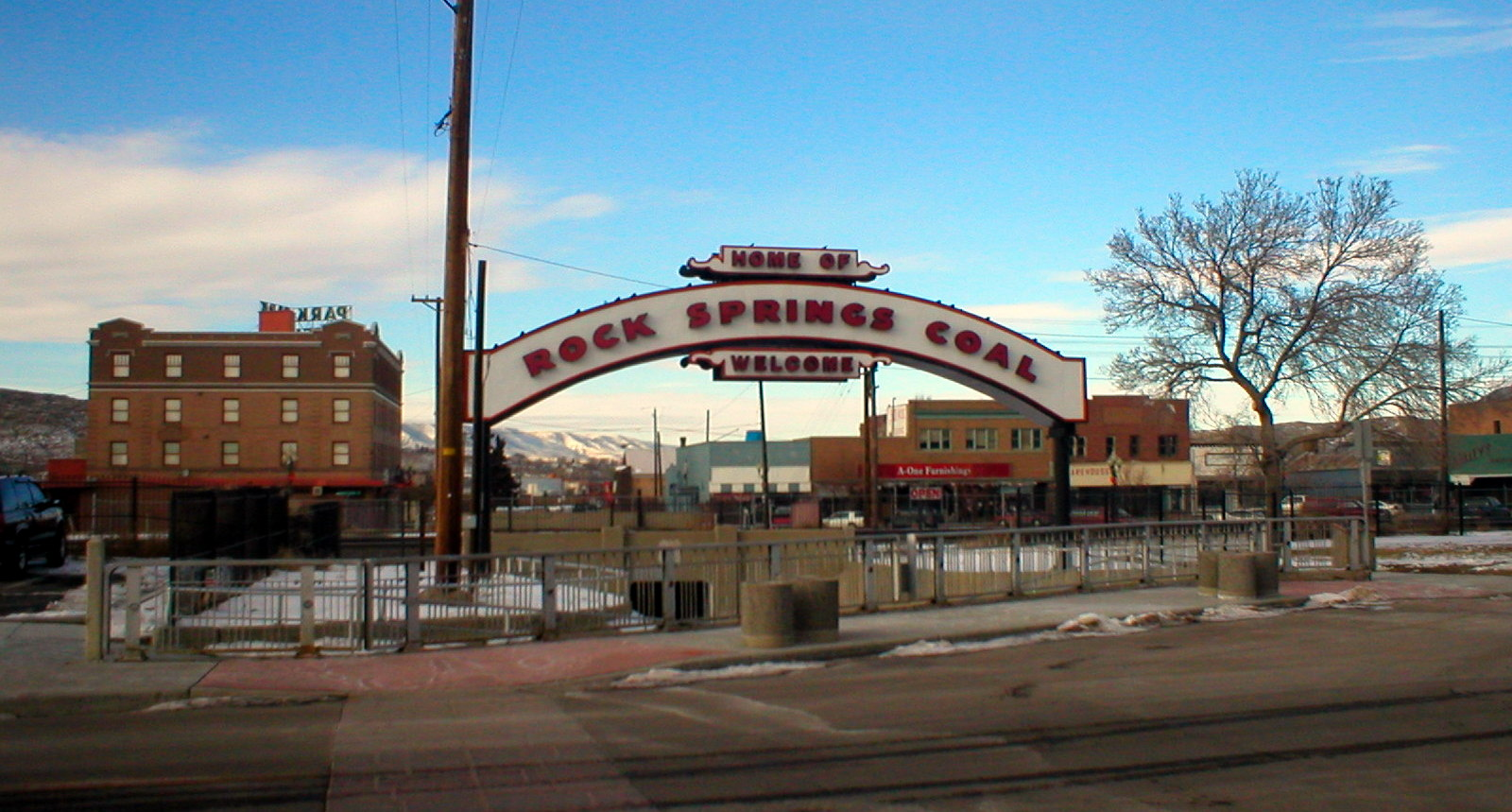
- Rock Springs Coal sign

- Location within Wyoming Location within the United States
- Location: Roughly bounded by K, 4th, C, 2nd, A and 5th Streets, Rock Springs, Wyoming
- Coordinates: 41°35′13″N 109°13′11″W
- Area: 15.97 acres (6.46 ha)
- Architectural style: Art Deco, Classical Revival, Late Victorian
- NRHP reference No.: 93001492 (original); 100009220 (increase)

Significant dates
- Added to NRHP: January 19, 1994
- Boundary increase: October 2, 2023

The Downtown Rock Springs Historic District is a historic district that was listed on the National Register of Historic Places in 1994, with an enlargement in 2023. It is roughly bounded by K, 4th, C, 2nd, A, and 5th Streets in downtown Rock Springs, Wyoming.

The district was site of the 1885 Chinese Massacre.

It included 27 contributing buildings and 18 non-contributing buildings. Two properties were already separately-listed on the National Register.

Contributing buildings include:

- Park Hotel (1914–15), 19 Elk Street, designed by D.D. Spani.
- First National Bank Building, now known as First Security Bank, separately listed on the NRHP.
- City Hall, separately listed on the NRHP.
- Rock Springs station built in 1900.

== See also ==
- List of National Historic Landmarks in Wyoming
- National Register of Historic Places listings in Wyoming
