= Green River station (Wyoming) =

Defunct railway station in Green River, Wyoming

Green River, WY
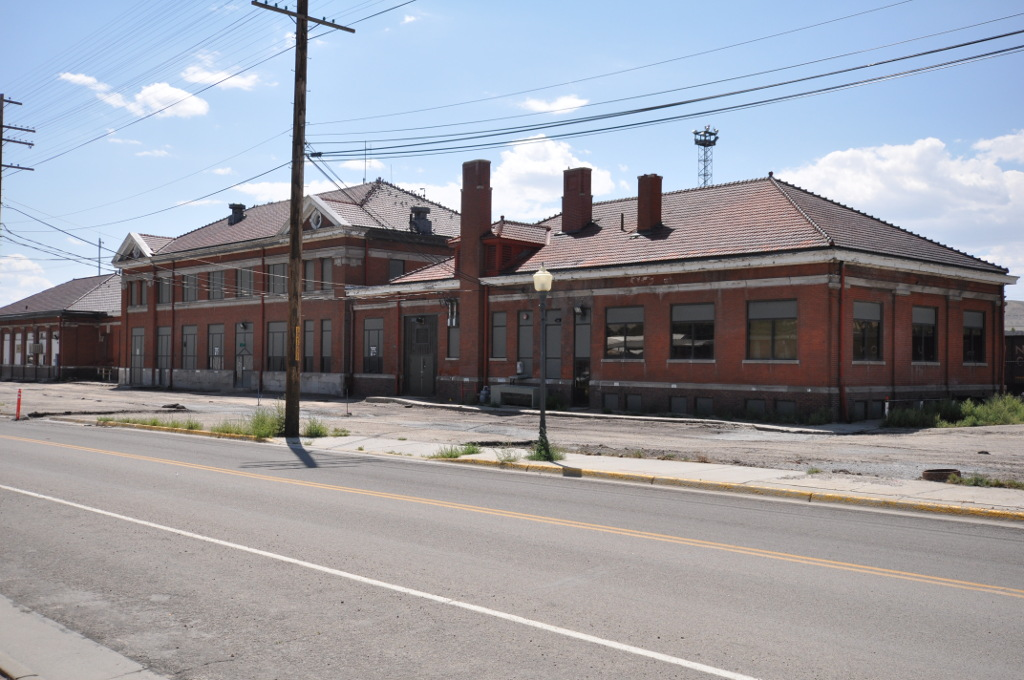
- The depot building in August 2017

General information
- Location: 200 East Railroad Avenue; Green River, Wyoming
- Coordinates: 41°31′37″N 109°27′58″W
- Line: Union Pacific Railroad

History
- Opened: June 17, 1991
- Closed: July 16, 1983; May 10, 1997
- Rebuilt: 1910

Former services
Preceding station	Amtrak	Following station
Evanston toward Seattle	Pioneer 1991–1997	Rock Springs toward Chicago
Evanston toward Oakland-16th Street	San Francisco Zephyr 1972–1983	Rock Springs toward Chicago
Evanston toward Oakland-16th Street	City of San Francisco 1971–1972	Rock Springs toward Chicago
Preceding station	Union Pacific Railroad	Following station
Knight toward Ogden	Overland Route	Peru toward Council Bluffs Transfer
Location

Green River station is a former train station in Green River, Wyoming. It was served by the Union Pacific Railroad from its construction to 1971, and by Amtrak from 1971 to 1983 and again from 1991 to 1997. The Pioneer was the last train to serve Green River.

The depot is a contributing property to the Green River Downtown Historic District, which was added to the National Register of Historic Places in 2009.

== History ==
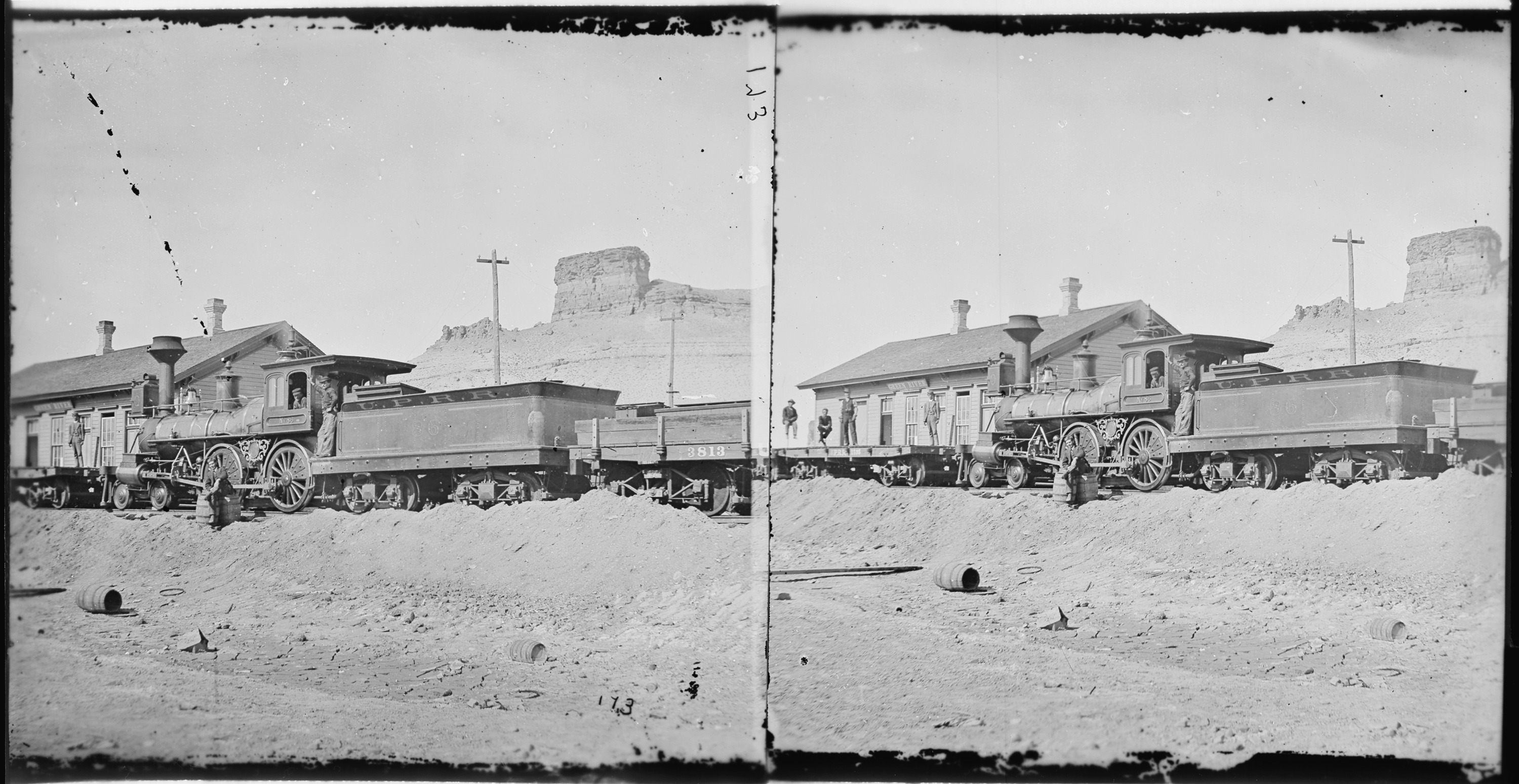
The old Union Pacific station before the current one was built

The Union Pacific Railroad first reached Green River from the east on October 1, 1868, while building the first transcontinental railroad. The company later opened a depot in the town. However, the old depot was starting to show its age. Green River residents said that "the town is dying" and that a new depot had to be built. There were fears that Green River would be abandoned in favor of Granger, a town 30 miles to the west and a junction on the Overland Route. But construction of the new depot had begun. In 1910 the current depot was completed, with offices being moved into it from Ogden. Green River grew into a major town on the line and became a division point for the railroad. Sometime in the 1940s the crow's nest lookout on the trackside roof was added.

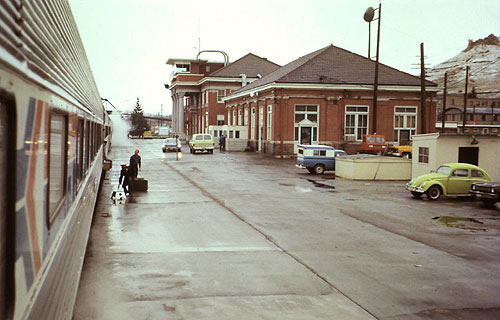
The San Francisco Zephyr at the station on April 25, 1976

Amtrak took over intercity service on May 1, 1971, with its City of San Francisco running until June 1972, when it was replaced by the San Francisco Zephyr. The California Zephyr replaced the San Francisco Zephyr on July 16, 1983, but its more-southern route temporarily ended passenger rail service to Green River.

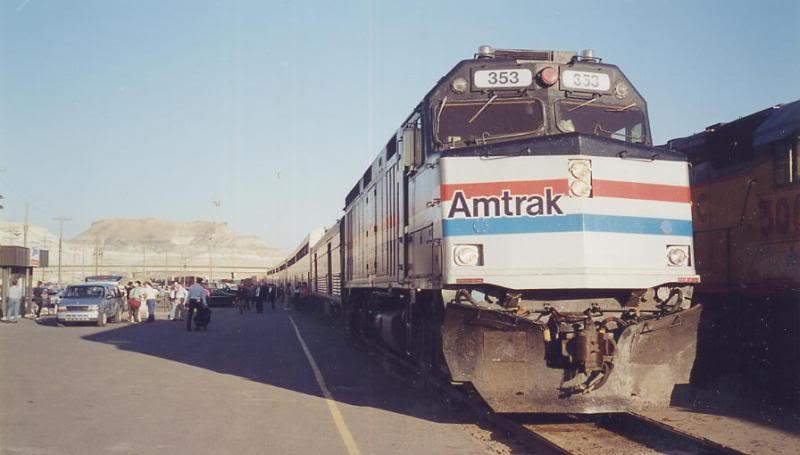
The last Pioneer at Green River, May 1997

Amtrak service was restored with the rerouting of the Pioneer via Green River on June 17, 1991, but ended for a second time on May 10, 1997 with the discontinuation of the Pioneer.

The depot was placed on the National Register of Historic Places on January 8, 2009, as a contributing property to the Green River Downtown Historic District.

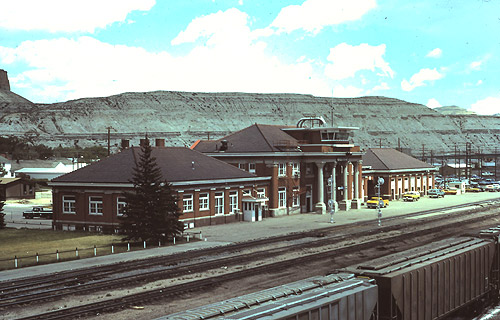
The depot in June 1978

Currently, the depot is undergoing restoration by the city itself and has received around $200,000 from the EPA to clean up contaminants in the depot. When completed, restoration of the roof will begin.

== See also ==
- Peru, Wyoming
- Rock Springs station
- Peru Hill
