= Greater Green River Intergalactic Spaceport =

Greater Green River Intergalactic Spaceport Green River Spaceport
- IATA: none; ICAO: none; FAA LID: 48U

Summary
- Airport type: Public
- Operator: City of Green River
- Location: Green River, Wyoming
- Elevation AMSL: 7,182 ft (2,189 m)
- Coordinates: 41°27′29″N 109°29′24″W
- Interactive map of Greater Green River Intergalactic Spaceport

Runways
Direction	Length		Surface
Direction	ft	m	Surface
04/22	5,652	1,723	Dirt

Statistics (2020)
- Aircraft operations (year ending 9/30/2020): 350
- Source: Federal Aviation Administration

The Greater Green River Intergalactic Spaceport is a small public use airstrip about 5 mi (8.0 km) south of Green River, Wyoming, United States, on a mountain known as South Hill. It opened in 1963.

== Facilities ==
The airport covers 400 acres (160 ha) at an elevation of 7,182 ft (2,189 m). It has one runway, 04/22, 5,652 by 75 ft (1,723 by 23 m) feet gravel. The runway is unattended, with no buildings or facilities, except a windsock. The runway has a clear line of sight from the runway ends. Communications are through CTAF and most of the services are from nearby Rock Springs - Sweetwater County Airport.

In the year ending September 30, 2020, the airport had 350 aircraft operations, all general aviation. No aircraft or spacecraft were then based at the airport.

In August 2020, the Wyoming Army National Guard's 133rd Unit completed training at the spaceport through a program called Innovative Readiness Training (IRT). Through the IRT, military units can apply their skills and resources to benefit local communities during their scheduled training periods. The 133rd is an Engineering Company that builds runways when deployed. In the past Runway 4/22 had a line of sight issue, but the 133rd was able to work towards resolving this issue and grading Runway 4/22 and the Connector.

== Spaceport ==
On July 5, 1994, Resolution R94-23 of the Green River City Council designated this landing field as the "Greater Green River Intergalactic Spaceport", for inhabitants of Jupiter who might wish to take sanctuary in Green River in the event their planet is threatened by collisions from comets or meteors, in apparent reference to the contemporary Comet Shoemaker–Levy 9 impact.

== See also ==
- List of airports in Wyoming
