= Wilkins Peak =

Mountain in United States of America

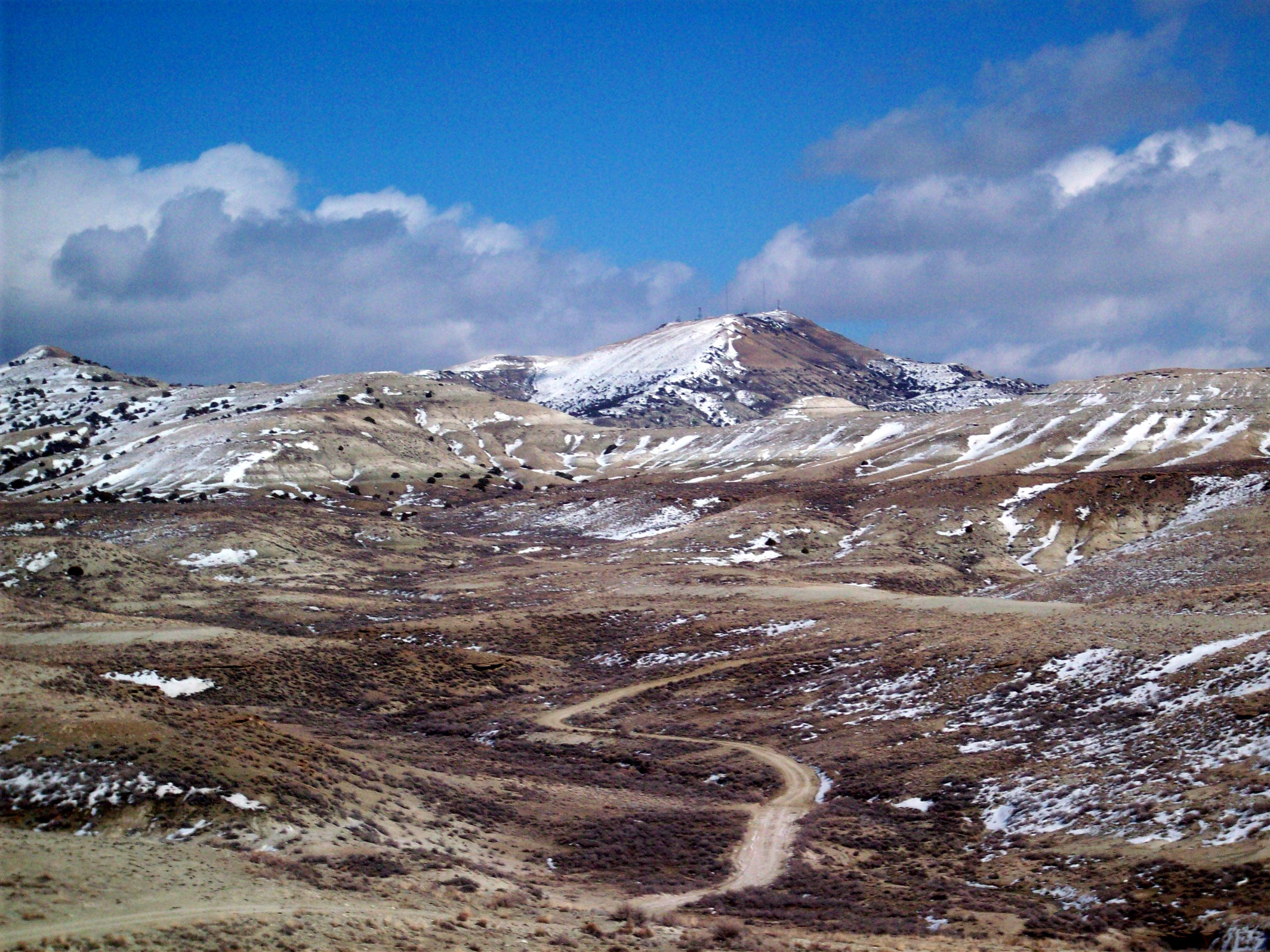
- Wilkins Peak

Highest point
- Elevation: 7,650 ft (2,330 m)
- Coordinates: 41°29′47.44″N 109°20′45.15″W

Geography
- Location within Wyoming
- Location: Sweetwater County, Wyoming, U.S.

Climbing
- Easiest route: Access Road

The remains of the KUWZ tower still present in 2005

Wilkins Peak is a small mountain located in Sweetwater County, Wyoming, between the cities of Green River and Rock Springs. It is primarily used for radio and television station transmitters, but it also serves radio needs of the FAA, EMS, and local businesses such as Questar Gas. In 2003, a tower on the peak was knocked down by a vehicle delivering propane to customers. The tower was owned by Wyoming Public Radio and served the local area with programming from National Public Radio. There are numerous access roads to the peak. It is not gated and is open year-round, weather permitting. Along with radio, the mountain is also a popular location for mountain biking and hiking. The mountain's geology is typical for its location in southwestern Wyoming.

== Geology ==
Along with other mountains in southwestern Wyoming, Wilkins Peak is part of the Green River Formation, a formation of the intermontane Lake Gosiute environment during the Eocene epoch. Similar to its neighboring Aspen Mountain, Wilkins Peak is part of the Rock Springs Uplift, and some of the largest oil shale and trona beds in the region are located near the mountain. The Rock Springs Uplift formed during the Laramide Orogeny. Wilkins Peak also has its own distinct segment of the Green River Formation, which is known as the Wilkins Peak Member. The peak itself is 7,650 feet (2,332 m) in elevation and is located 8.18 miles (13 km) from Rock Springs, Wyoming and 6.3 miles (10 km) from Green River, Wyoming. The peak displays evidence of an ancient Lake Gosiute, a large inland saliene lake that existed 50 million years ago. The peak is composed of repetitive layers (cycles) of white dolomitic marlstone, greenish-gray mudstone, and oil shale.

== Radio and television uses ==
Wilkins Peak holds radio towers for several FM radio and television stations. Stations include KYCS (95.1 FM) and its sister stations KFRZ (92.1 FM) and KZWB (97.9 FM). Also on the mountain is the tower for the station KTME 89.5, which signed on the air in September 2010. KTME is an affiliate of Pilgrim Radio. The transmitter for KREO 93.5 is also on the peak. KLWR 101.9 FM, and KAWR 98.7 are also on Wilkins Peak, and carry programming from K-Love and Air1 respectively. Several television translators transmit or have transmitted their signals from two small towers located in the center of Wilkins Peak. The religious television network TBN had a translator known as K35CN, broadcasting from the mountain. Prior to 2009, K22BK, the local PBS television translator, carried its signal from Wilkins Peak. K22BK was moved across the interstate to White Mountain to the same tower as its digital counterpart (K28JU-D). In late 2009, a new television station signed on the air from the peak. It was known as K33IX-D on channel 33 (UHF) and carried programming from IBN Television. The station is currently off air. K35CN and K22BK have been off the air since the digital television transition in the year 2009.

=== FM translators ===
Among high-powered FM radio stations, Wilkins Peak is also currently host lower-powered FM translators. K205FE carries a Gospel format on 88.9 FM. K232CU rebroadcasts KLWR on 94.3 FM, and K285FG retransmits programming from AM station KUGR on 104.9 FM.

=== Other radio related uses ===
Wilkins Peak also has repeater towers for local police, fire, and EMS services. The emergency radio repeaters on the mountain are used in conjunction with other repeaters located on nearby Aspen Mountain and Mansface Hill.

In September 2003, a commercial truck delivering propane to customers on the peak knocked down the then-existent KUWZ tower after the vehicle's brakes failed. The collapse of the tower knocked out power to the mountain for several hours, and while KUWZ borrowed space from neighboring towers for several months thereafter, the station ultimately relocated its transmitter to nearby Aspen Mountain.

== Accessing the peak ==
Wilkins Peak is not gated, and it can be reached via an unpaved road known as Wilkins Peak Road that starts on U.S. Route 191 southwest of Rock Springs, Wyoming. The mountain can also be accessed via another unpaved road that begins in the Scott's Bottom Nature Area in Green River, Wyoming. The peak is accessible year-round, weather permitting. The Green River access road is in worse shape than the Rock Springs side, and it has several road hazards such as steep grades, poor grading, and off-road vehicle traffic. Along with serving radio needs, the peak also is a popular hiking and mountain biking location in the area. There are many smaller roads and trails that spring from the peak that offer varied degrees of challenge.

== Trail system ==
The Sweetwater Mountain Bike Association, in partnership with the BLM, U.S. Forest Service and Rock Springs Grazing Association has sanctioned the mountain biking trail system known as the Wilkins Peak Trail System, currently a group of single track trails encompassing just over 24 miles located on land directly west of Wilkins Peak. Accessed primarily from the Green River area these trails offer a mix of varying difficulty levels for every rider. Current trail maps can be obtained for free at the Green River Chamber of Commerce at the Visitor Center.
