= Green River Downtown Historic District =

Historic district in Green River, Wyoming, United States

- U.S. National Register of Historic Places
- U.S. Historic district
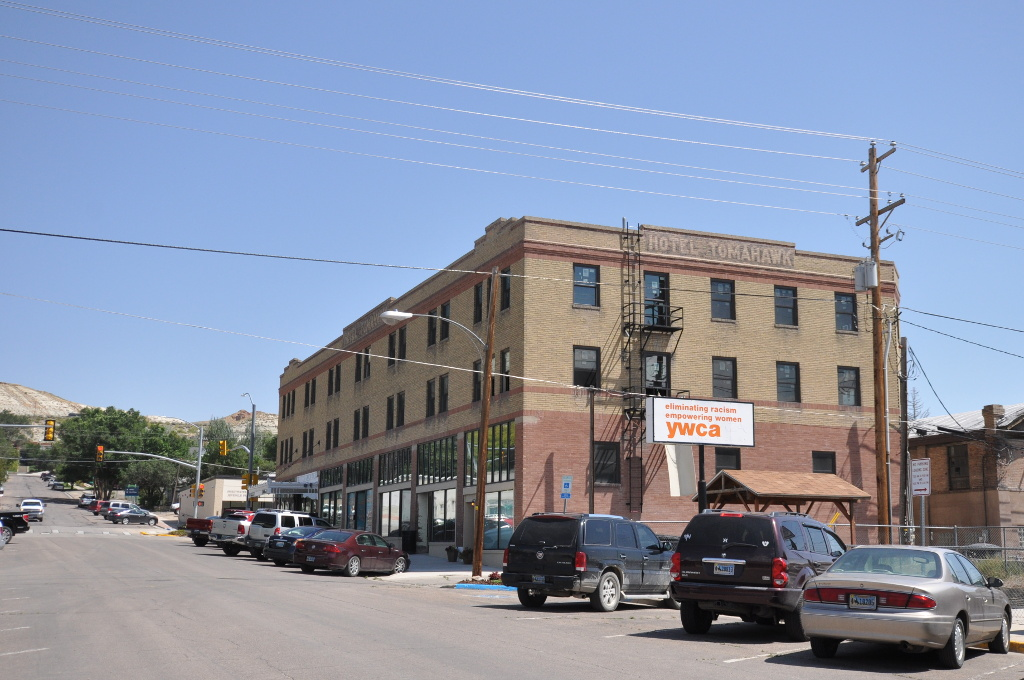

- Location within Wyoming Location within the United States
- Location: 72-142 Flaming Gorge Way, 58-94 N. 1st St., 125-200 E. Railroad Ave., 62-94 N. 1st E. St., and the pedestrian overpass, Green River, Wyoming
- Coordinates: 41°31′42″N 109°27′59″W
- Area: 5.7 acres (2.3 ha)
- NRHP reference No.: 08001306
- Added to NRHP: January 8, 2009

The Green River Downtown Historic District is a 5.7-acre (2.3 ha) historic district in Green River, Wyoming that was listed on the National Register of Historic Places in 2009.

== Description ==
The district includes 11 contributing buildings and one other contributing structure, including the Union Pacific Depot.

It includes the surviving portion of the original core area of Green River.

== See also ==
- National Register of Historic Places listings in Sweetwater County, Wyoming
