= Wilkins Peak Member =

- Stratigraphic range: Eocene (~50–48 Ma)
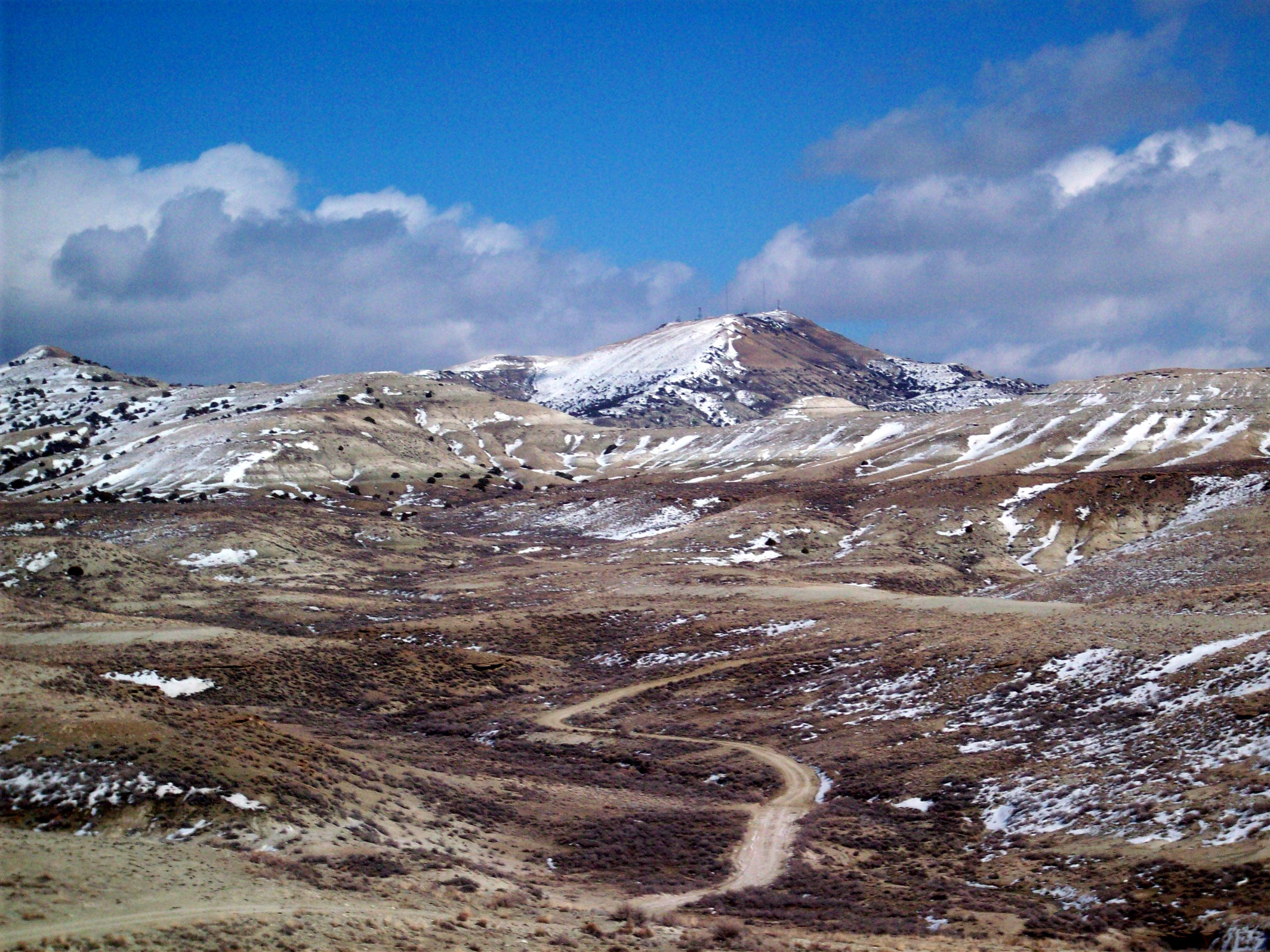
- Wilkins Peak, located in southwestern Wyoming.
- Type: Member
- Thickness: Up to 1,200 feet (370 m)

Lithology
- Primary: Marlstone, Oil shale, Trona, Mudstone

Location
- Location: Green River Basin, Wyoming

The Wilkins Peak Member is a distinctive stratigraphic unit within the Eocene Green River Formation, located primarily in the Greater Green River Basin of southwestern Wyoming. It is recognized by geologists for its high-concentration evaporite deposits and its high-resolution record of ancient climate change. The formation gets its name from Wilkins Peak.

During the early Eocene, an ancient lake, known as Lake Gosiute, was one of three in the Green River system. The lake levels dropped significantly, resulting in a highly saline and alkaline environment, which was different from the Tipton Member and Laney Member, which surrounded it.

== Lithology ==
The Wilkins Peak Member is known for its Dolomitic marlstone, which is a light colored carbonate rock making up the majority of the formation. Also present is oil shale, organic rich mudstone that represented Lake Gosiute's expansion. Tufa, and microbialites are present and are a result of algae and bacteria. Finally, evaporites, such as trona, halite, and shortite are present, as a result of Gosiute's evaporation.

== Trona ==
Southwestern Wyoming is home to the world's largest deposit of trona, which is used in everyday products such as baking soda, glass, and other chemicals. Throughout the formation, there are at least 25 "beds", some up to 10 feet thick. They are mined nearby, west of Green River.

The formation itself is ~1,200 feet (365 meters) in thickness. Scientists have identified 120 "cycles" in the formation, showing everything from lake expansion, recession, and desiccation. Desiccation is present as of complete drying or extreme salinity, resulting in the precipitation of trona and other salts.

== Fossils ==
Because of its salinity, the layer is not as conducive to having large fossils as the surrounding regions, like the Green River formation. Small crustaceans (ostracods) and snails (gastropods) are frequently found in the marlstone layers. These organisms could tolerate fluctuating salinity. They are often the primary animal fossils in the "shallows" of the Wilkins Peak Member. While fish are rarer here than in other members, they do occur in the organic-rich oil shale layers (the "high-stand" phases). The most common find is Knightia, a small herring-like fish that was highly adaptable. Organic fossils of leaves, wood, seeds, and palms are found in the deltaic and shoreline sandstones. These fossils provide evidence of the subtropical forests that surrounded the arid basin, including palms, ferns, and hardwoods. Small insect fossils have also been found.
