= D. D. Spani =

American architect

Daniel D. Spani, known as D.D. Spani, was an American architect who practiced in Rock Springs, Wyoming. His work includes Rock Springs Elks' Lodge No. 624, which was listed on the National Register of Historic Places for its unique-in-Wyoming architecture, and other architectural landmarks of the city.

D. D. Spani was the first professional architect in Rock Springs. He moved to Rock Springs from St. Louis in 1911, with 14 years experience. In the 1930s, Spani was still the only architect in Sweetwater County.

Daniel's father, Dominick Spani, was an immigrant from Switzerland who was a builder and contractor in Benton, Illinois. Daniel attended the University of Illinois but left in 1902 in his senior year. In 1903 Spani went to St. Louis in 1903 and worked under architect Theodore Link, and then at architects Eames and Young. He then worked as an inspector of millwork of post office buildings throughout Kentucky, Tennessee, and part of Indiana, for seven years.

His notable works include:

- Sts Cyril and Methodius Church (1912), Rock Springs, Wyoming
- Yellowstone Elementary School (1922–23), Rock Springs, Wyoming, "a beautiful example of vernacular Collegiate Gothic architecture"
- Rock Springs Elks' Lodge No. 624 (1924), Rock Springs, Wyoming
- St. Patrick's Church (Kemmerer, Wyoming) (1925 renovation)
- Park Hotel (1914–15), 19 Elk Street, Rock Springs, included in the Downtown Rock Springs Historic District
- Security State Bank Building, Rock Springs
- North Side State Bank (former), Rock Springs
- Rock Springs High School (former), Rock Springs
- Roosevelt School, Rock Springs
