= Rock Springs station =

Defunct railway station in Rock Springs, Wyoming

Rock Springs, WY
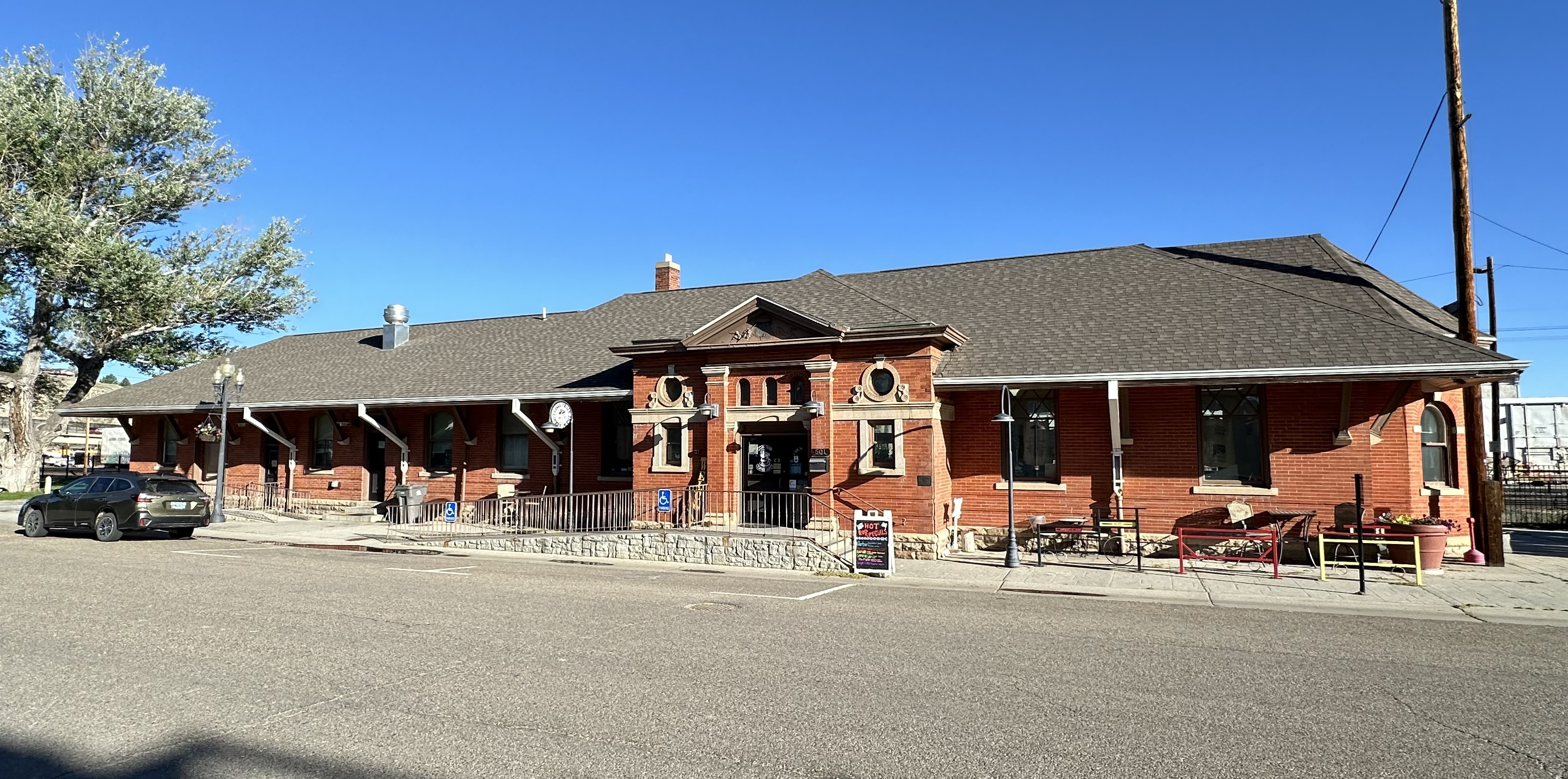
- Rock Springs station building in 2024

General information
- Location: 2501 S. Main Street; Rock Springs, Wyoming
- Coordinates: 41.586972°N 109.220250°W
- Line: Union Pacific Railroad

History
- Opened: 1900; June 17, 1991
- Closed: July 16, 1983; May 10, 1997
- Rebuilt: 1990s

Former services
Preceding station	Amtrak	Following station
Green River toward Seattle	Pioneer 1991–1997	Rawlins toward Chicago
Green River toward Oakland-16th Street	San Francisco Zephyr 1972–1983	Rawlins toward Chicago
Green River toward Oakland-16th Street	City of San Francisco 1971–1972	Rawlins toward Chicago
Preceding station	Union Pacific Railroad	Following station
Peru toward Ogden	Overland Route	Kanda toward Council Bluffs Transfer
Location

Rock Springs station is a former train station in Rock Springs, Wyoming. It was served first by the Union Pacific Railroad. Union Pacific Railroad built the depot in 1900, and used the depot till 1971. The first passenger station opened in 1868, with a nearby Rock Springs coal station. Starting in 1971, the Amtrak passenger train service used the depot till 1983 and then again from 1991 to 1997. The Pioneer was the last passenger train to stop in Rock Springs. The Rock Springs depot is a contributing building in the Downtown Rock Springs Historic District.

== History ==
In 1868, the Union Pacific Railroad arrived at Rock Springs as part of the first transcontinental railroad. The company also opened a depot for the Rock Springs Union Pacific Railroad coal depot in 1868. The coal stop fueled the City of Rock Springs and steam locomotives, with coal from nearby coal mines. Union Pacific Coal Company closed its last coal mine in Rock Springs in the 1950s. At its peak, the Union Pacific Coal Company operated four large coal mines in and around Rock Spring. In the 1950s, the Union Pacific started replacing steam locomotives with diesel locomotives. Diesel locomotives are safer and require less maintenance. The last Rock Springs mine closed in 1963. The Union Pacific Freight Station was located at 603 South Main Street. The first passenger depot was built in 1870, two years after the tracks were install.

Amtrak took over passenger service on May 1, 1971, with its City of San Francisco running until June 1972, when it was replaced by the San Francisco Zephyr. The California Zephyr replaced the San Francisco Zephyr on July 16, 1983, but its more-southern route temporarily ended passenger rail service to Rock Springs.

Amtrak service was started again with the rerouting of the Pioneer via Rock Springs on June 17, 1991, but ended on May 10, 1997, with the ending of the Pioneer.

== Gallery ==
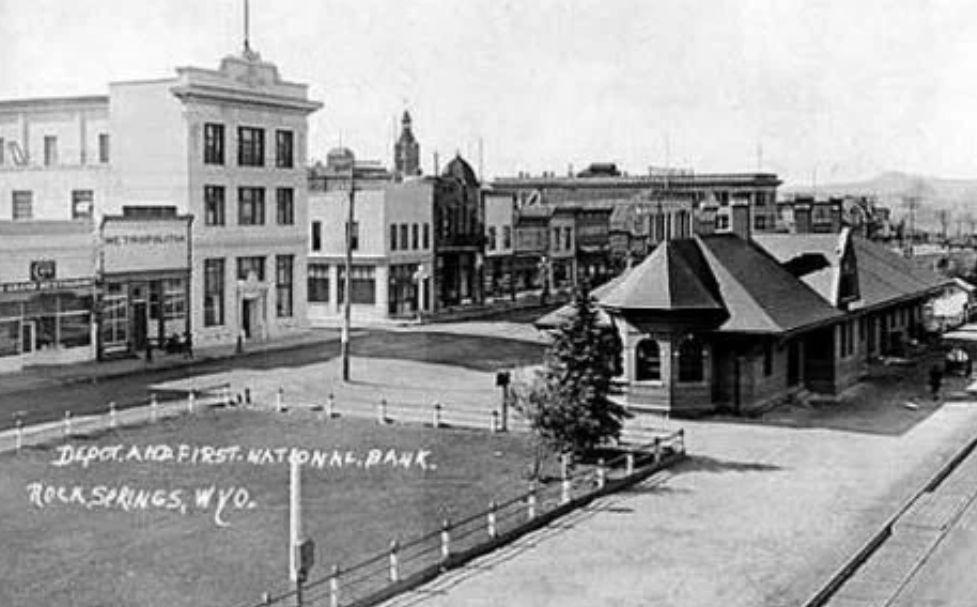
Union Pacific Railroad depot in 1919

Rock Springs, with coal mines and Union Pacific Railroad tracks in 1890

Rock Springs coal station, in Rock Springs, Wyoming in 1908. The Union Pacific Railroad coal chutes were used to load Union Pacific Railroad steam locomotives

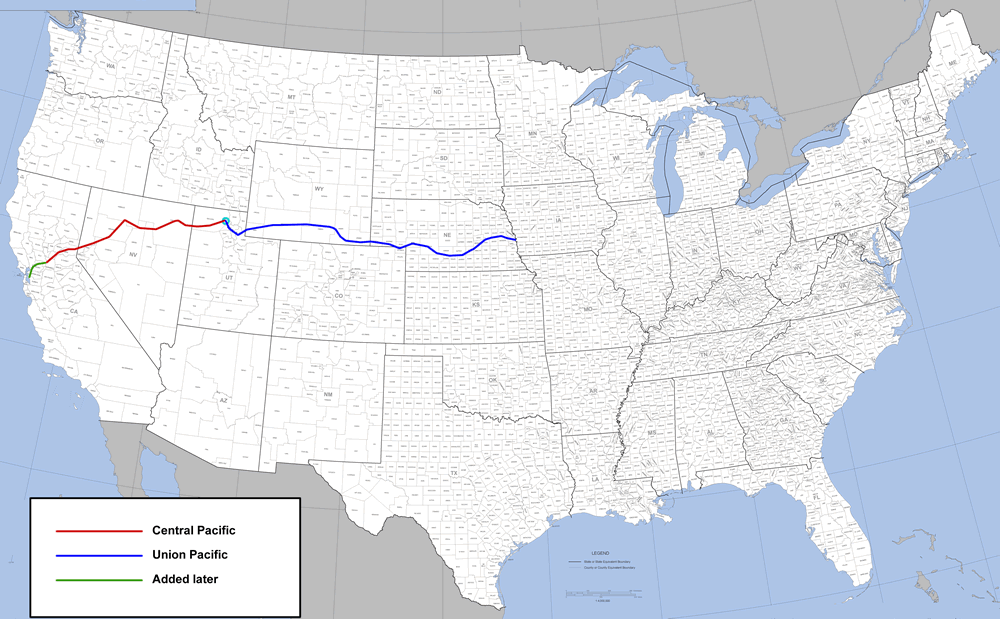
Route of the first American transcontinental: The Central Pacific (red) in the west and the Union Pacific (blue) met in Utah in 1869. Rock Springs is on the blue route

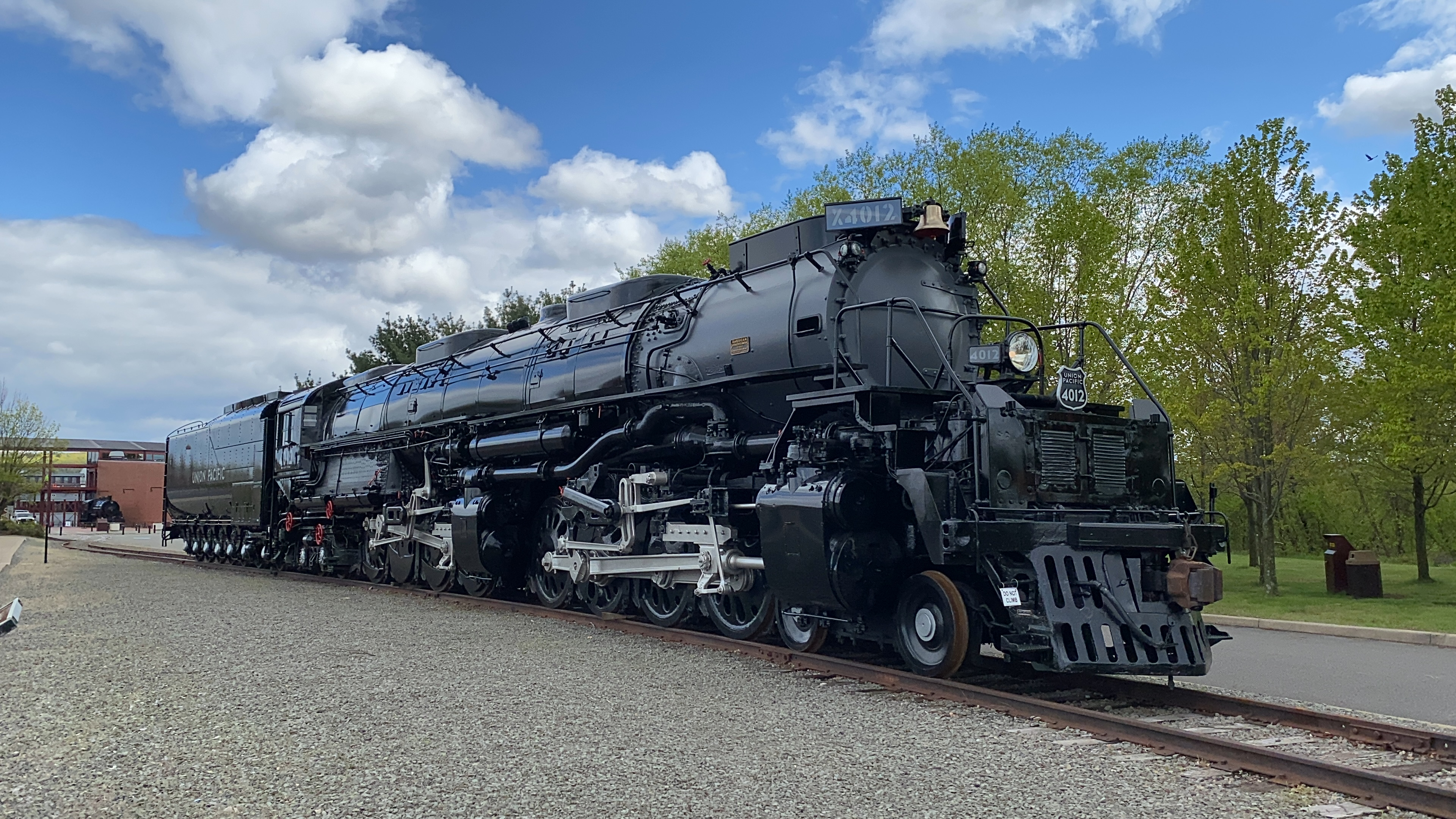
In the 1940s and 1950s, the Union Pacific Railroad ran the largest steam engine locomotive through the depot, the Union Pacific Big Boy locomotive. Union Pacific had 25 Big Boys built for pulling heavy loads over the mountains.

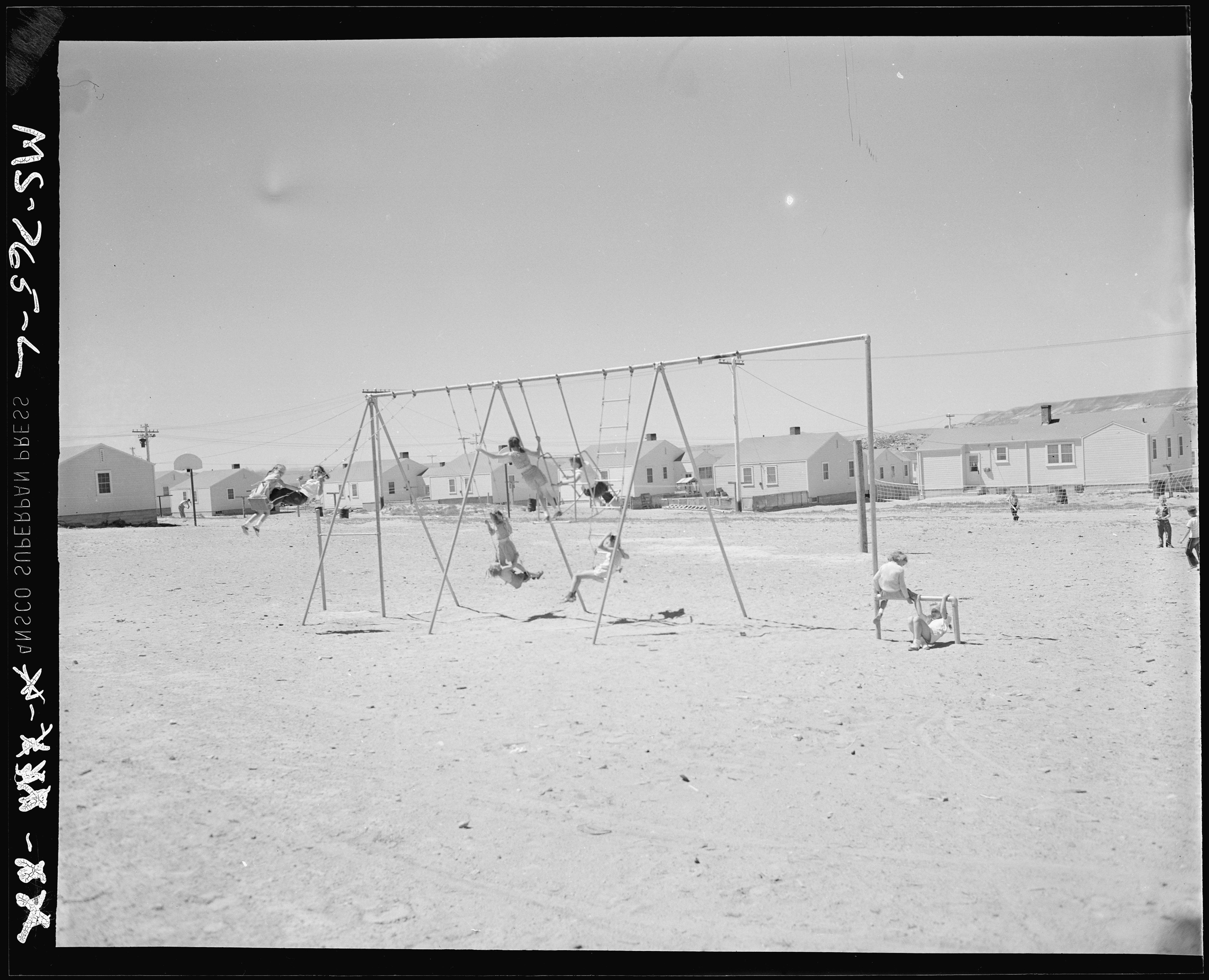
Playground for miner's children at the Union Pacific Coal Company's Stansbury Mine in Rock Springs

== See also ==
- Overland Route (Union Pacific Railroad)
- Wyoming historical monuments and markers
- Borie station
- Cheyenne Depot Museum
- Evanston Depot
- Blairtown, Wyoming
