= KZWB =

- Green River, Wyoming; United States
- Broadcast area: Sweetwater County
- Frequency: 97.9 MHz
- Branding: The Big Dog 97.9

Programming
- Format: Classic hits
- Affiliations: Cumulus Media

Ownership
- Owner: Wagonwheel Communications Corporation
- Sister stations: KUGR, KYCS, KFRZ, KFZE

History
- First air date: June 1, 2005

Technical information
- Licensing authority: FCC
- Facility ID: 162319
- Class: C2
- ERP: 10,500 watts
- HAAT: 327 meters (1,073 ft)
- Transmitter coordinates: 41°29′46.05″N 109°20′44.74″W

Links
- Public license information: Public file; LMS
- Website: KZWB Online

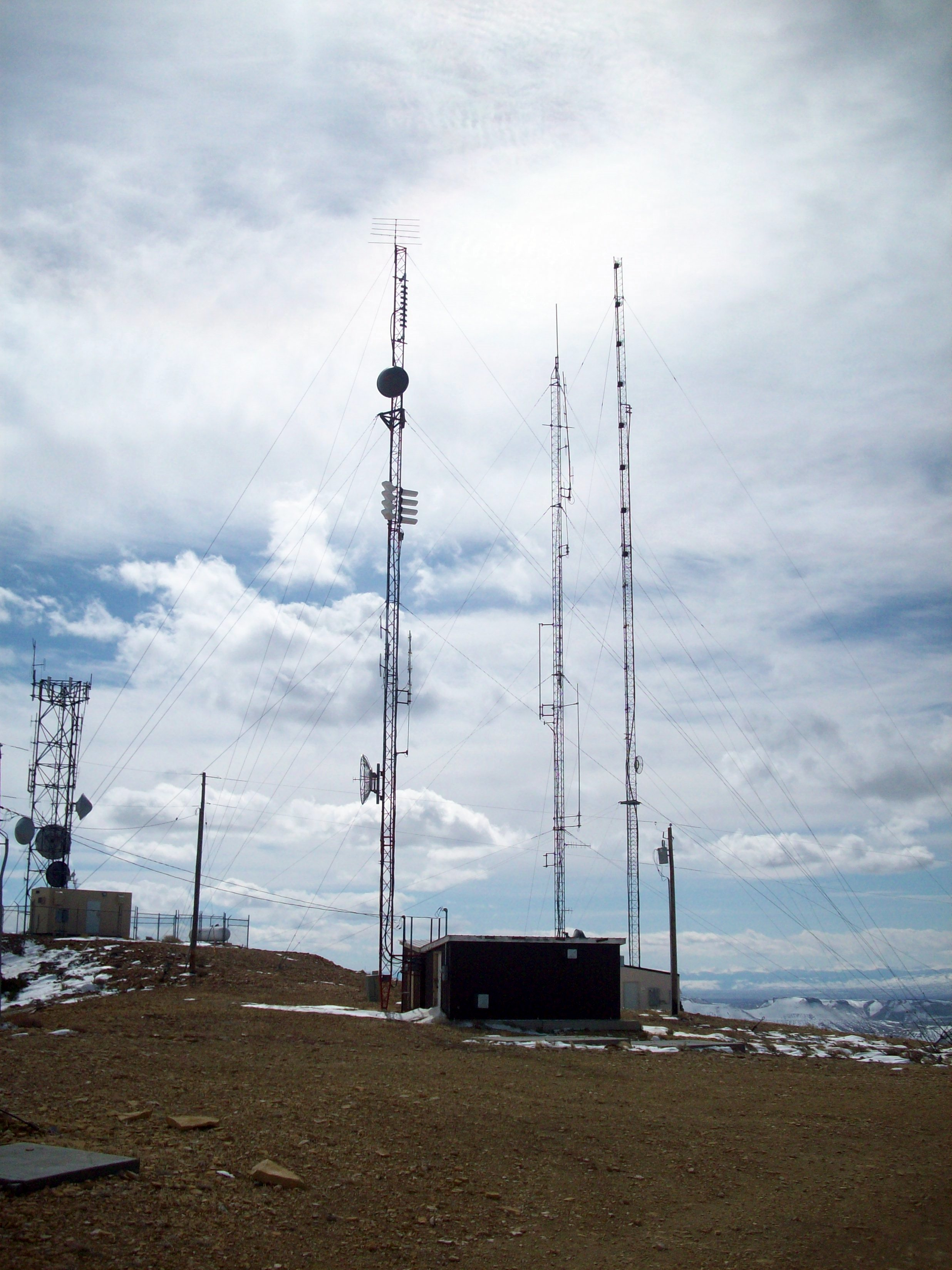
KZWB's radio tower (farthest right) shared with KFRZ.

KZWB's studios in Green River

KZWB (97.9 FM) is a radio station broadcasting from Green River, Wyoming. The station signed on June 1, 2005. KZWB is owned by Wagonwheel Communications Corporation, who also owns KUGR and KZWB's sister stations KYCS, KFZE, and KFRZ.

KZWB specializes in a classic hits music format that plays music from primarily the 1960s, and 1970s, but occasionally plays music from the 1980s.

== Signal ==
KZWB, like its sister stations, broadcasts from Wilkins Peak just outside Rock Springs, Wyoming in Sweetwater County. The station shares tower space with KFRZ and transmits a 10,500 watt signal to protect KBZN in Utah. The signal reaches the majority of Sweetwater County, and begins to weaken near Rawlins to the east, and Mountain View to the west. The signal reaches into parts of northeastern Utah, and as far north as Pinedale. KZWB and KFRZ are both at 7,646 feet (2,331 m) above sea level on Wilkins Peak.
