= KTGA =

- Saratoga, Wyoming; United States
- Frequency: 99.3 MHz
- Branding: Big Foot 99

Programming
- Format: Classic rock

Ownership
- Owner: Toga Radio LLC
- Sister stations: KBDY

History
- First air date: 2005
- Call sign meaning: Saratoga

Technical information
- Licensing authority: FCC
- Facility ID: 164278
- Class: C1
- ERP: 18,000 watts
- HAAT: 324.1 meters (1,063 ft)
- Transmitter coordinates: 41°40′46″N 107°14′8″W

Links
- Public license information: Public file; LMS
- Webcast: Listen live
- Website: bigfoot99.com

KTGA (99.3 FM) is a radio station licensed to Saratoga, Wyoming, United States. The station is owned by Toga Radio LLC and carries a classic rock format.

== History ==
KTGA received its construction permit on February 22, 2005. The station was transferred to Toga Radio LLC in 2007. The station's transmitter is located on Chokecherry Knob, south of Rawlins. KTGA is joined on the mountain by Wyoming Public Radio's KUWI 89.9, and K206AJ 89.1, licensed to Sinclair, Wyoming but also operated by Wyoming Public Radio.

The station has consistently won awards. In 2017, the station received the Wyoming Association of Broadcasters award for Small Market Station of the Year. In 2022, the station won an award for its website and use of Facebook.

KTGA and KBDY share a studio at 1108 W. Bridge Street in Saratoga.
