= KREO (FM) =

- James Town, Wyoming; United States
- Broadcast area: Rock Springs, Wyoming
- Frequency: 93.5 MHz
- Branding: 307 Country

Programming
- Format: Country

Ownership
- Owner: John King and Kelli King; (Pilot Butte Broadcasting LLC)

History
- First air date: 2015
- Former call signs: KTEA (09/2012-11/2012); KMGQ (11/2012-2014)

Technical information
- Licensing authority: FCC
- Facility ID: 190387
- Class: C2
- ERP: 8,000 watts
- HAAT: 323 meters (1,060 ft)
- Transmitter coordinates: 41°33′30″N 109°21′50″W

Links
- Public license information: Public file; LMS
- Webcast: Listen Live
- Website: 307Country.com

KREO (93.5 FM) is an American radio station licensed to serve the community of James Town, Wyoming.

== History ==
The station signed on as KTEA on September 24, 2012. In November 2012, the station changed its call letters to KMGQ. The call letters KREO were assigned to the station in January 2014. In July 2016, the owners of two local competing radio stations filed a letter with the Federal Communications Commission regarding the station, noting it would occasionally broadcast a silent carrier, or another licensed broadcast station out of Evanston, Wyoming, some 100 miles to the west. Both filed that the station made on air claims that it would create a translator network and increase its power, however the FCC noted that there were no applications for such changes. It was also claimed that the station was rebroadcasting an internet radio station out of a private residence in Rock Springs, Wyoming, and had no main studio. In addressing the main studio concern, the station informed the FCC that it was broadcasting from a studio in Rock Springs. The station remained silent until August 2016, when it flipped to a country format. The FCC dismissed the claims made by the competing stations in December 2016.

== Signal ==
KREO can be heard throughout Sweetwater County. The station's broadcast tower is located on top of Wilkins Peak between Rock Springs and Green River. KREO's tower is 2,341 metres (7,680 ft) above sea level.
