= Rock Springs Elks' Lodge No. 624 =

- U.S. National Register of Historic Places
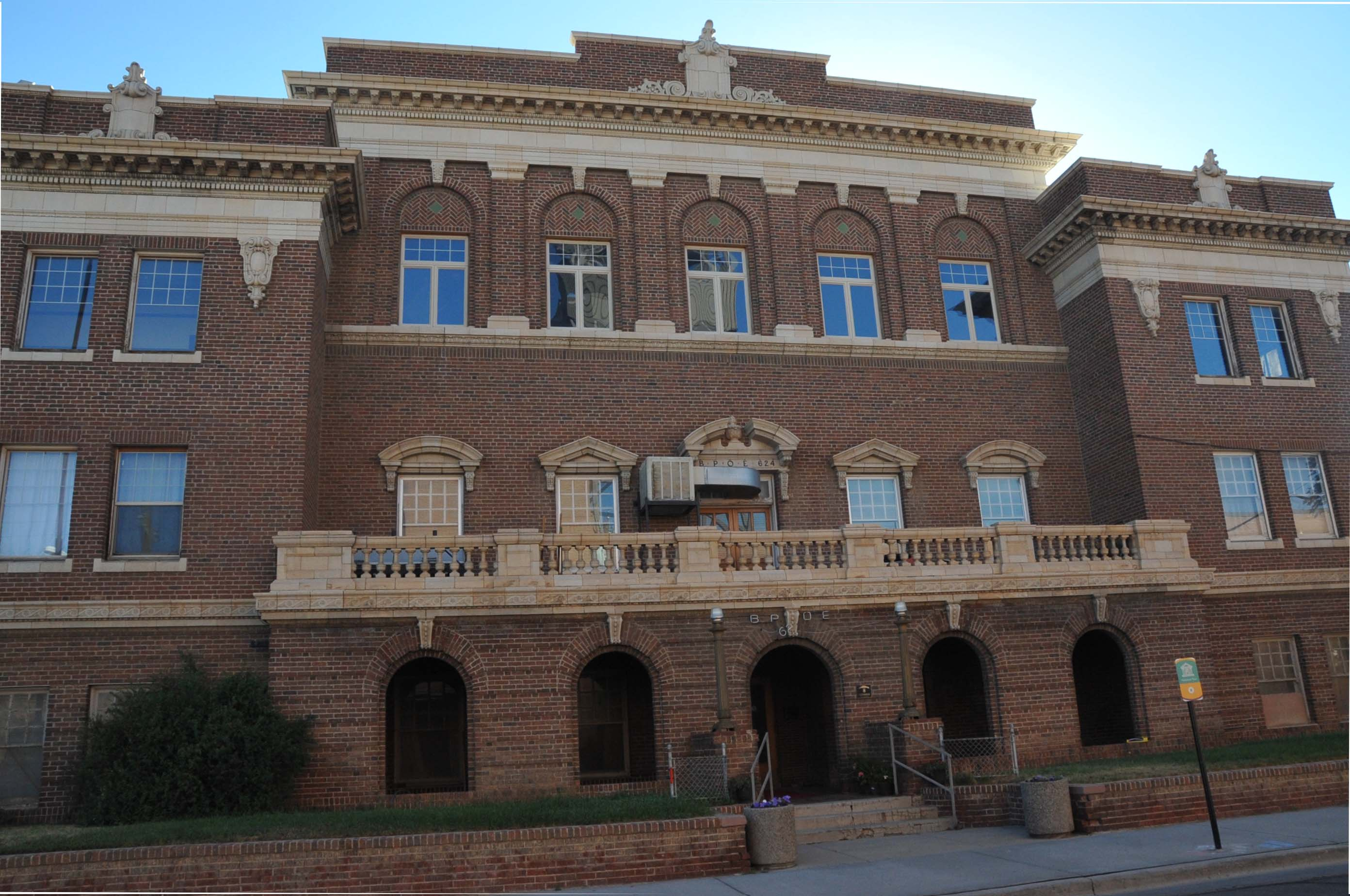

- Location within Wyoming Location within the United States
- Location: 307 C St., Rock Springs, Wyoming
- Coordinates: 41°35′4″N 109°13′8″W
- Area: less than one acre
- Built: 1924
- Built by: Cowell, F.H.
- Architect: Spani, D.D.
- Architectural style: Italian Renaissance Revival
- NRHP reference No.: 93001383
- Added to NRHP: December 10, 1993

Rock Springs Elks' Lodge No. 624, also known as Elks' Lodge and denoted 848SW7692, is a three-story 94 feet (29 m) by 96 feet (29 m) building at C and Second Streets in Rock Springs, Wyoming that is listed on the National Register of Historic Places. It was built in 1924 and is architecturally unique in the state. It was designed by D.D. Spani in Italian Renaissance style, using brick with terra cotta ornamentation.

It was listed on the National Register of Historic Places in 1983.
