= Green River Star =

Weekly newspaper in Green River, Wyoming

- Type: Weekly newspaper
- Format: Tabloid
- Owner: Sweetwater Now
- Founded: 1889
- Language: English
- Headquarters: 445 Uinta Drive; Green River, Wyoming 82935; 41°31′32″N 109°28′11″W
- Circulation: 2,218
- ISSN: 0891-382X
- Website: greenriverstar.com

The Green River Star is a weekly newspaper published in Green River, Wyoming. It serves as the newspaper of record for the city of Green River and the surrounding Sweetwater County. The publication focuses on local government, community events, and high school athletics. The Star office, located at 445 Uinta Drive, is the former site of the Rancho Bowl (also known as Rancho Bowling Lanes). The bowling alley operated at that location from 1960 until it closed in 2004, after which the newspaper moved into the renovated facility.

== History ==
The newspaper was established in 1889 by William W. McMurray, a pioneering journalist in the then-Wyoming Territory. In its early years, the Star competed with several other local bulletins during the region's coal mining and railroad boom. By the mid-20th century, it solidified its position as the primary news outlet for the county seat. In the mid-20th century, the paper underwent several ownership changes. John Rhea Jacobucci, a notable figure in Wyoming politics and business, served as the editor starting in 1936. In 1968, the publication was purchased by Sage Publishing, which expanded its distribution and modernized its printing operations.

Throughout the 2000s, the paper transitioned to a digital-first model while maintaining its Wednesday print edition. In 2021, the newspaper's reporting on local law enforcement transitions received recognition from regional press associations.

=== Content and Operations ===
The Green River Star covers municipal proceedings of the Green River City Council and the Sweetwater County Board of County Commissioners. It also provides coverage of the Sweetwater County School District #2.

While many regional competitors faced closure in August 2025 due to shifts in the ownership strategies of out-of-state media conglomerates, the Green River Star continued its operations. Following cut backs in printing of its longtime rival, the Rocket-Miner, the Star became the largest circulated print newspaper in Sweetwater County. In late 2025, the newspaper expanded its coverage to include more county-wide reporting to fill the gaps left by defunct publications. It currently maintains a physical office at 445 Uinta Drive in Green River.
