= First National Bank Building (Rock Springs, Wyoming) =

- U.S. National Register of Historic Places
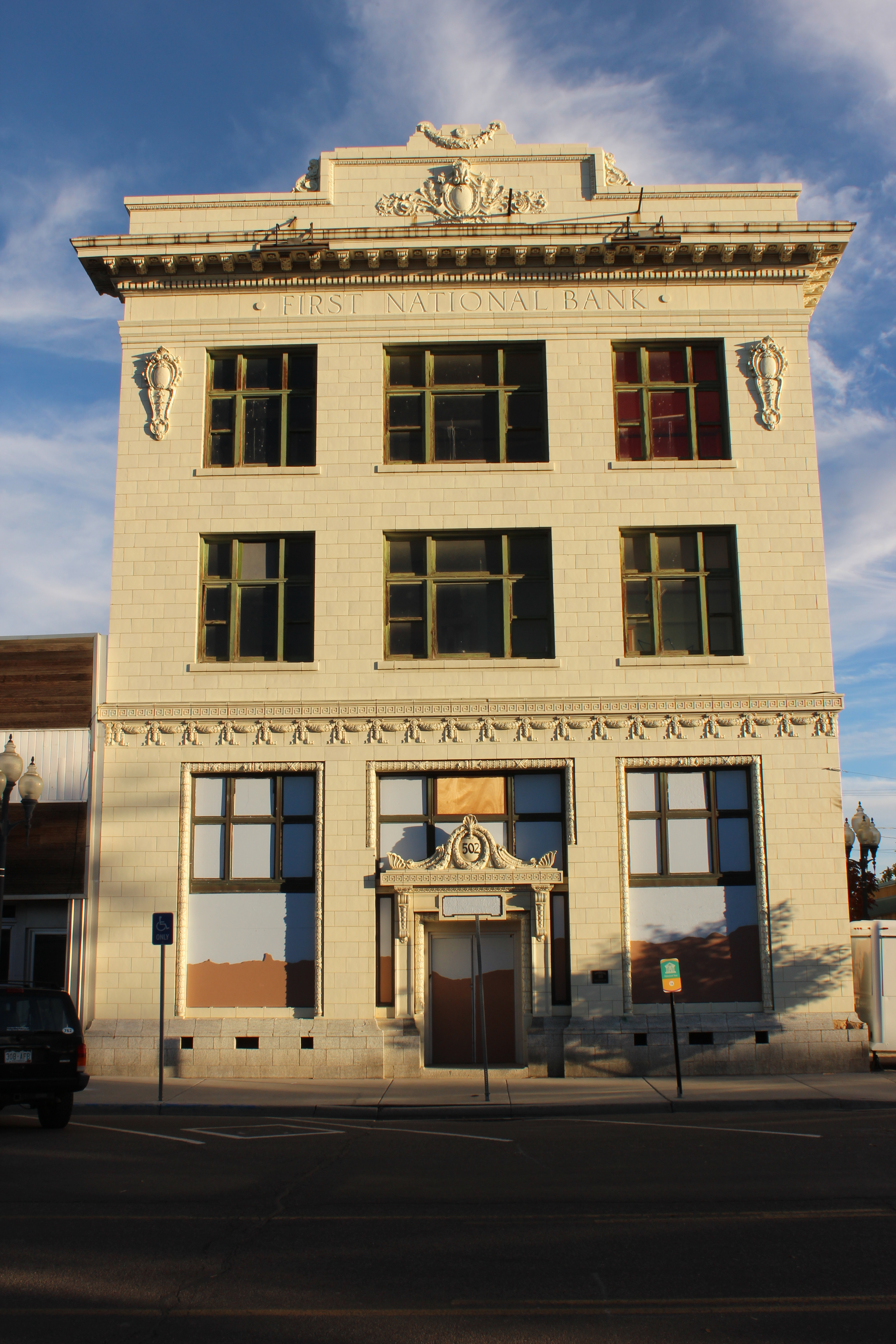

- Location within Wyoming Location within the United States
- Location: 502 S. Main St., Rock Springs, Wyoming
- Coordinates: 41°35′11″N 109°13′10.5″W
- Area: 0.5 acres (0.20 ha)
- Built: 1917
- Architect: Cooper, Walter J.; Spanni, D.D.
- NRHP reference No.: 80004054
- Added to NRHP: March 13, 1980

The First National Bank Building, at 502 S. Main St. in Rock Springs, Wyoming, is a historic building built in 1917. Also known as Security Bank Building, it was listed on the National Register of Historic Places in 1980.

It is notable for "its dominance" of the skyline and architecture of Rock Springs; the building includes "the most elaborate use of terra cotta in southwestern Wyoming". It was designed by Walter J. Cooper and D.D. Spanni.

In the fall of 2020, a complete renovation of the building began. It will accommodate an array of commercial uses, with retail and office spaces.
