= KFZE =

- Daniel, Wyoming; United States
- Broadcast area: Pinedale, Wyoming/Sublette County
- Frequency: 104.3 MHz
- Branding: The Freeze (shared with sister KFRZ)

Programming
- Format: Country

Ownership
- Owner: Alan and Faith Harris; (Wagonwheel Communications Corporation)
- Sister stations: KUGR, KYCS, KFRZ

History
- First air date: 2013
- Former call signs: KYPT (2006–2013)
- Call sign meaning: FreeZE

Technical information
- Licensing authority: FCC
- Facility ID: 166004
- Class: C3
- ERP: 4,000 watts
- HAAT: 127 meters
- Transmitter coordinates: 42°50′39″N 109°55′28″W

Links
- Public license information: Public file; LMS
- Webcast: Live stream
- Website: theradionetwork.net

KFZE (104.3 FM) is a radio station licensed to serve Daniel, Wyoming, United States. The station is currently owned by Alan and Faith Harris, through licensee Wagonwheel Communications Corporation. The station carries Wyoming Cowboys football. It is also a member of the Denver Broncos Radio Network. It carries weather forecasts from Dayweather, based out of Cheyenne.

== History ==
The station was initially owned by White Park Broadcasting, with the call sign KYPT beginning in 2006. It was originally slated to broadcast from Wamsutter, Wyoming. Following the sale to Wagonwheel Communications for $50,000, the city of license was moved to Daniel, near Pinedale in 2013.
