= Blairtown, Wyoming =

Unincorporated community in Wyoming, US

Coordinates: 41°34′24″N 109°13′50″W

Blairtown is an unincorporated community in Sweetwater County, Wyoming, United States. It is located near Rock Springs. Town is named after the Blair Brothers who constructed a store and a bridge across the creek from Rock Spring in 1866.

== Industry ==
Many key industries are located here, including Halliburton and Schlumberger. This is a stretch of road that intersects with U.S. Route 191.

== History ==
This town was a mining area before it became a town. It was started by the Blair Brothers back in the 1860s. It has its own park and is located near a set of Union Pacific Railroad.

== See also ==
- Rock Springs station
