= Green River City Council =

Governing body of Green River, Wyoming

The Green River City Council is the governing body of the city of Green River, Wyoming. Currently, the council has six members, representing three wards within the city, two members to a ward.

The city council’s duties are primarily legislative. It also oversees financial decisions the city pursues. Council directs affairs of Green River by passing ordinances or adopting resolutions. An ordinance or resolution may be introduced by a council member at a meeting, but ideas for them also may originate from citizens or members of the City staff.

== Current councilors ==
- Hank Castillon – Mayor
- Gene Smith – Ward I
- Tom McCullough- Ward I
- Adam Coppolo – Ward II
- Lisa Maes- Ward II
- Gary Killpack – Ward III
- Jim Boan- Ward III

== Criticism ==
The city council of Green River has received criticism over the years from both local residents, and business owners alike. Most of this criticism is seen at council meetings, which are held twice a month. Citizens are allowed to voice their concerns during these meetings, which are also televised live on the city's local Government-access television (GATV) cable TV station – channel 13.

In December 2007, a previously instated smoking ban ordinance was overturned by a vote of 4–3. Other towns in Wyoming had previously successfully instated a similar ordinance. The move to overturn the ordinance drew complaints from local residents at the meetings who stated the health benefits of a smoke-free town. Local businesses complained that the ban would decrease their customer base, and also said the original smoking ban had several problems, when compared to other towns' smoking bans, including those in nearby Rock Springs.

Green River's council has also faced several problems in the past with economic growth of the city. Some of the city council members own businesses, and potentially have created conflicts of interest in regards to new businesses in the city. In mid-2001, the possibility of a new grocery store acquiring the former Jubilee store at the time was debated with much intensity. Several local residents praised the idea of a new grocery store, and new businesses in general, but the idea was scrapped. The new grocery store was unable to obtain a liquor license, and declined to build in the city. Some of the residents complained that even though they were business owners themselves, there was such a concept a competition, and the city (or council members themselves) were potentially afraid of new growth.
