= KUGR =

- Green River, Wyoming; United States
- Broadcast area: Green River, Wyoming
- Frequency: 1490 kHz
- Branding: 1490 AM KUGR

Programming
- Format: Adult contemporary/Talk
- Affiliations: Westwood One, CBS News Radio

Ownership
- Owner: Wagonwheel Communications Corporation; (Alan Harris)
- Sister stations: KFRZ, KYCS, KZWB, KFZE

History
- First air date: September 26, 1976
- Call sign meaning: Cougar

Technical information
- Licensing authority: FCC
- Facility ID: 70698
- Class: C
- Power: 1,000 watts (unlimited)
- Transmitter coordinates: 41°30′56″N 109°26′11″W
- Translator: 104.9 K285FG (Rock Springs)

Links
- Public license information: Public file; LMS
- Webcast: Listen live
- Website: theradionetwork.net

KUGR's tower located east of the city.

KUGR's studios in Green River

Logo of KUGR, until the addition of Translator, 104.9 K285FG in Rock Springs, Wyoming (on September 27, 2013)

KUGR is a radio station located in Green River, Wyoming operating on 1490 AM. It carries a soft adult contemporary and talk format. The station is owned by Wagonwheel Communications Corporation. KUGR won the Wyoming Association of Broadcasters board "Station of the Year" award in 2006.

== History ==
KUGR station signed on in 1976. The station's license was applied for by William Simms, who originally wanted to put a station on the air in Green River in the 1960s. The station was purchased from William by manager Al Harris in 1978. The station added a translator on 104.9 FM in 2008.

The station part of "The Radio Network", which includes FM sister stations KFRZ 92.1 FM, KYCS 95.1 FM and KZWB 97.9 FM which came on air in 2005. The station added a new sister in 2013 in Daniel, Wyoming, known as KFZE. The station carries Wyoming Cowboys football and basketball games throughout the season. In some years, the station plays music synchronized during the Independence Day fireworks show in Green River.

In the past, the station assisted with fundraising efforts for Cowboys Against Cancer, an all-volunteer charity helping rural cancer patients.

== Coverage and signal strength ==
KUGR broadcasts a one thousand watt signal day and night. The signal covers much of Sweetwater County and has been heard even farther distances. The frequency KUGR operates on (1490 kHz) is classified as a local type station by the Federal Communications Commission (FCC), which means outside of Sweetwater County during the evening, KUGR will be competing with many other stations on the same frequency. KUGR is well known throughout the county and is a popular station thanks to its programming and variety. The station is recommended by the City of Green River as a means of information during severe weather or otherwise.

== Translator ==
KUGR operates a low power translator station, broadcasting from Wilkins Peak. This station is known as K285FG and has since 2008 been operating on 104.9 FM. K285FG broadcasts 250 watts. The translator station is currently simulcasting all of the AM programming on FM.

While not as powerful as its larger sister stations, such as KYCS, KFZE, and KFRZ, the signal of the translator is audible throughout most of Sweetwater County, and into parts of Uinta County to the east. The translator's coverage area mimics its parent station, as both achieve relatively the same distance, except during the evening hours when skywave radio propagation is present for KUGR.
