= KFRZ =

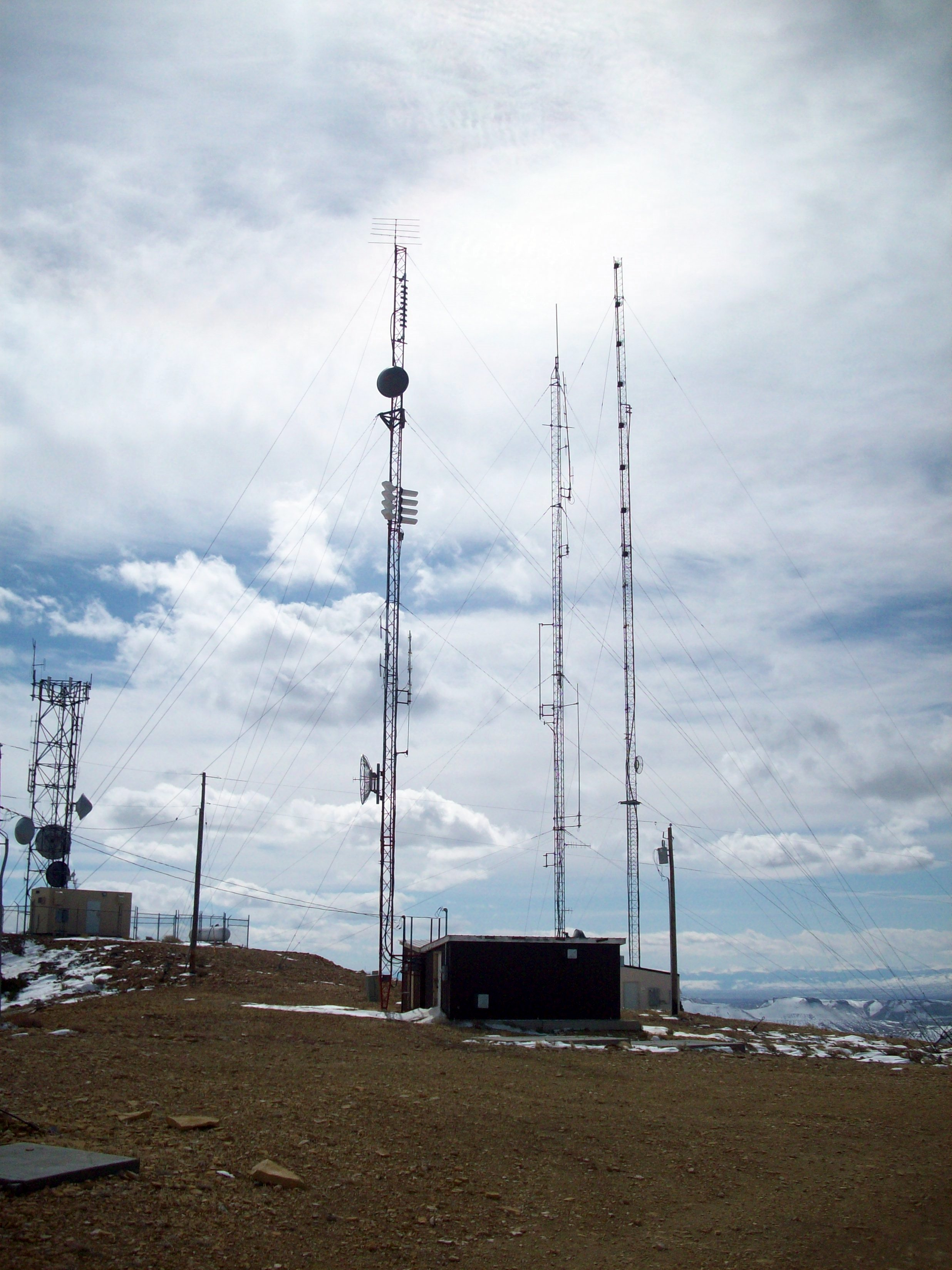
- KFRZ's radio tower (farthest right)
- Green River, Wyoming; United States
- Broadcast area: Rock Springs and Sweetwater County
- Frequency: 92.1 MHz
- Branding: 92.1 The Freeze

Programming
- Format: Country
- Affiliations: Westwood One

Ownership
- Owner: Wagonwheel Communications Corp
- Sister stations: KUGR, KZWB, KYCS

History
- First air date: September 1998
- Call sign meaning: Freeze

Technical information
- Licensing authority: FCC
- Facility ID: 83593
- Class: C1
- ERP: 11,000 watts
- HAAT: 347 meters (1,138 ft)
- Transmitter coordinates: 41°29′47″N 109°20′44″W

Links
- Public license information: Public file; LMS
- Website: theradionetwork.net

KFRZ's studios in Green River

KFRZ studios in 2002

KFRZ (92.1 FM) is a radio station licensed to Green River, Wyoming, United States, serving southwestern Wyoming. Broadcasting a country music format, the station is part of The Radio Network, which includes sister stations KUGR, KYCS, and KZWB. KFRZ broadcasts satellite fed music from Westwood One. Like its sister stations, KFRZ has local news throughout the day, and sports highlights as well. The station is currently owned by Wagonwheel Communications Corp.

== Signal ==
Like its sister FM stations, KFRZ broadcasts from a tower on Wilkins Peak located between Rock Springs and Green River. KFRZ's tower also houses KZWB's transmitter as well.

KFRZ can be heard throughout Sweetwater County, and in parts of northern Utah. KFRZ's signal begins fading at the Uinta County line to the west. KFRZ's tower is located 7,646 feet (2,331 m) above sea level on Wilkins Peak. KFRZ was once a class C station, carrying 90,000 watts. It downgraded to C1, carrying 11,000 watts.
