= KYCS =

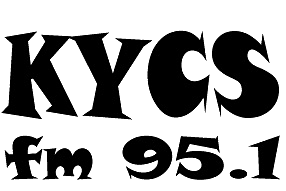

- KYCS's studios in Green River
- Rock Springs, Wyoming; United States
- Broadcast area: Sweetwater County
- Frequency: 95.1 MHz
- Branding: Kicks 95.1

Programming
- Format: Hot adult contemporary
- Affiliations: Westwood One

Ownership
- Owner: Wagonwheel Communications Corporation
- Sister stations: KUGR, KZWB, KFRZ, KFZE

History
- First air date: 1986
- Call sign meaning: "Kicks"

Technical information
- Licensing authority: FCC
- Facility ID: 20482
- Class: C
- ERP: 11,500 watts
- HAAT: 355 meters (1,165 ft)
- Transmitter coordinates: 41°29′50″N 109°20′36″W

Links
- Public license information: Public file; LMS
- Webcast: Listen live
- Website: theradionetwork.net

KYCS (95.1 FM) is a hot adult contemporary station broadcasting from Rock Springs, Wyoming, United States. The station signed on in 1986, as the first sister station of KUGR, which had been broadcasting for ten years at the time. Like its sister stations, the station is currently owned by Wagonwheel Communications Corporation.

Music on KYCS is primarily satellite fed. The network, known as Today's Best Hits from Westwood One, hosts numerous DJs throughout the day, including a morning show. KYCS celebrated its twenty first year of broadcasting in 2007. The station often broadcasts local events, such as an annual blood drive between Green River High School, and Rock Springs High School.

KYCS is one of several local stations that broadcast school closures as well.

== History ==
KYCS first came to air in 1986, as the second station in the Radio Network group. It was and continues to be owned by Alan Harris through Wagonwheel Communications.

KYCS was part of a study to add a new radio station to Meeker, Colorado, which was requesting an opportunity to move to Craig, Colorado. The station had to consider adjacent frequencies, of which KYCS was one. That station became KAYW on 98.1.

In July 2023, The Radio Network, the parent company of KYCS, expanded its media footprint by acquiring the digital publisher SweetwaterNOW, forming the largest multi-media company in southwest Wyoming and allowing for greater integration between radio and digital local news coverage.

== Signal ==
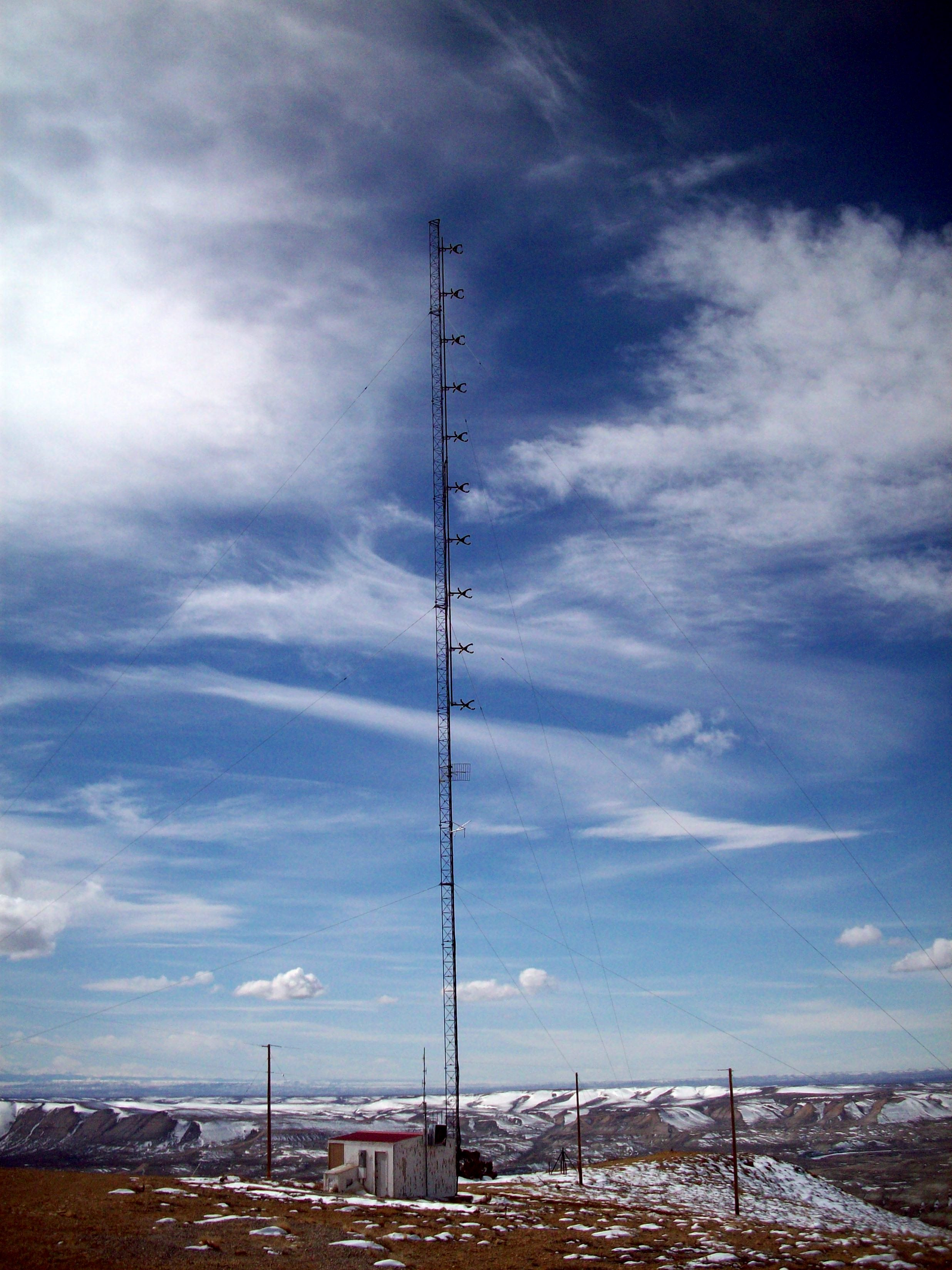
The radio tower for KYCS.

Like its sister stations, KYCS broadcasts from a tower located on Wilkins Peak, which is just outside Rock Springs. The 11,500 watt signal reaches into parts of northern Utah to the south. To the west, the station reaches Evanston before fading out completely. To the east, Rawlins receives fringe coverage. KYCS can be heard as far north as the Wind River mountain range. The tower for KYCS is 7,638 feet (2,328 m) above sea level on Wilkins Peak.
