= Green River, Wyoming =

- City
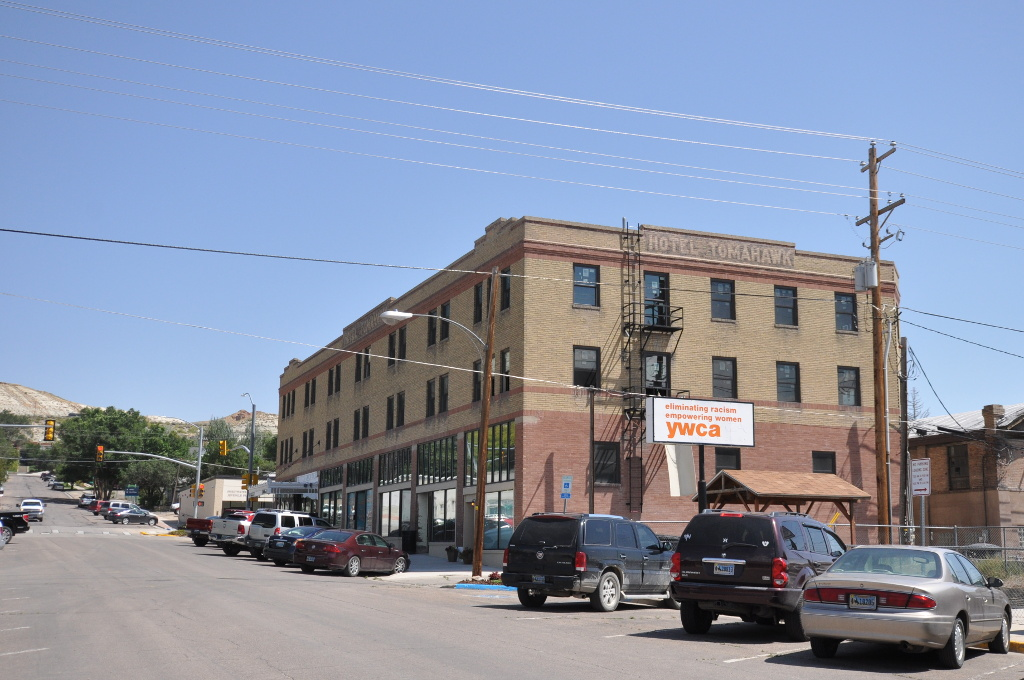
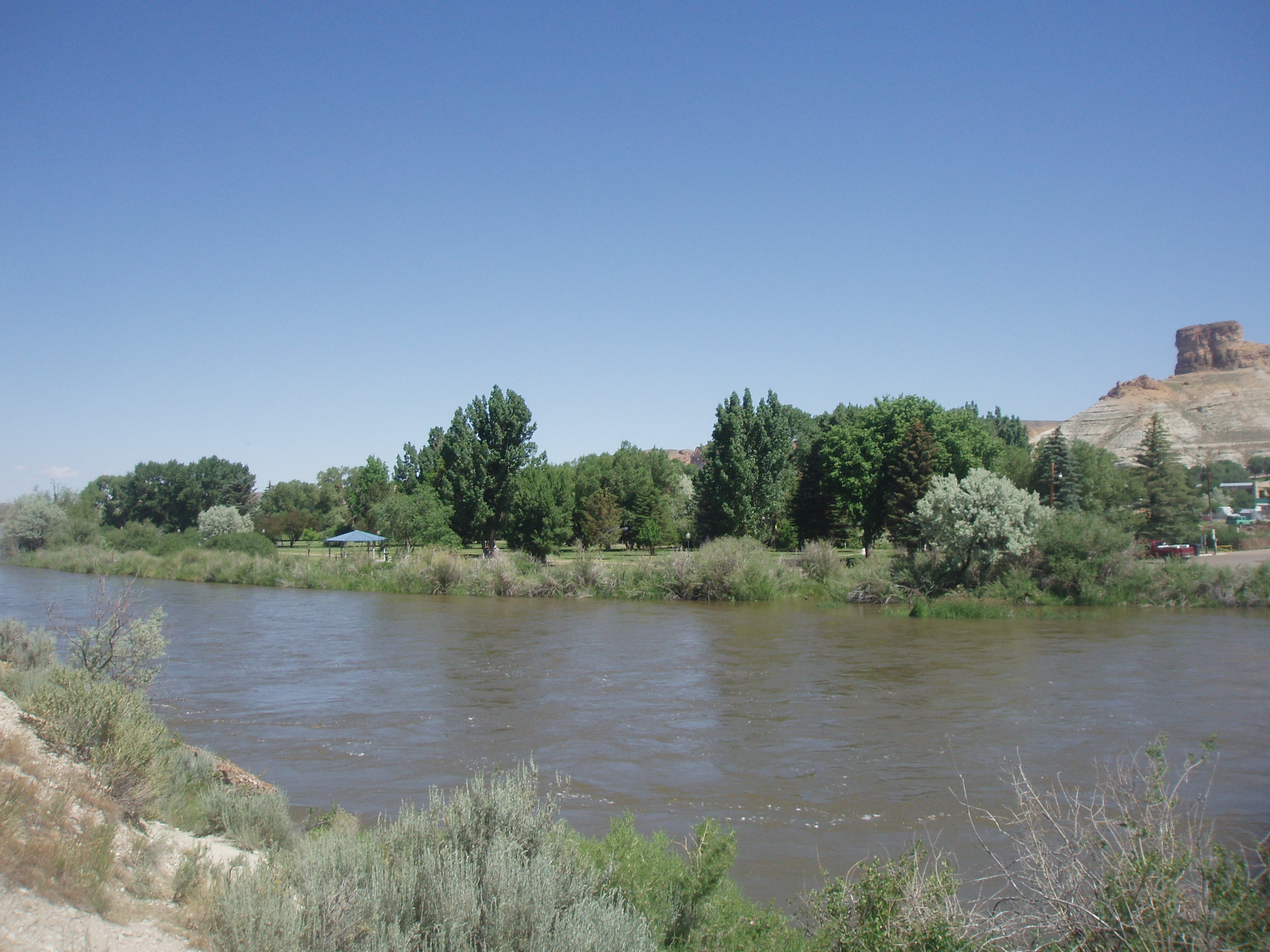
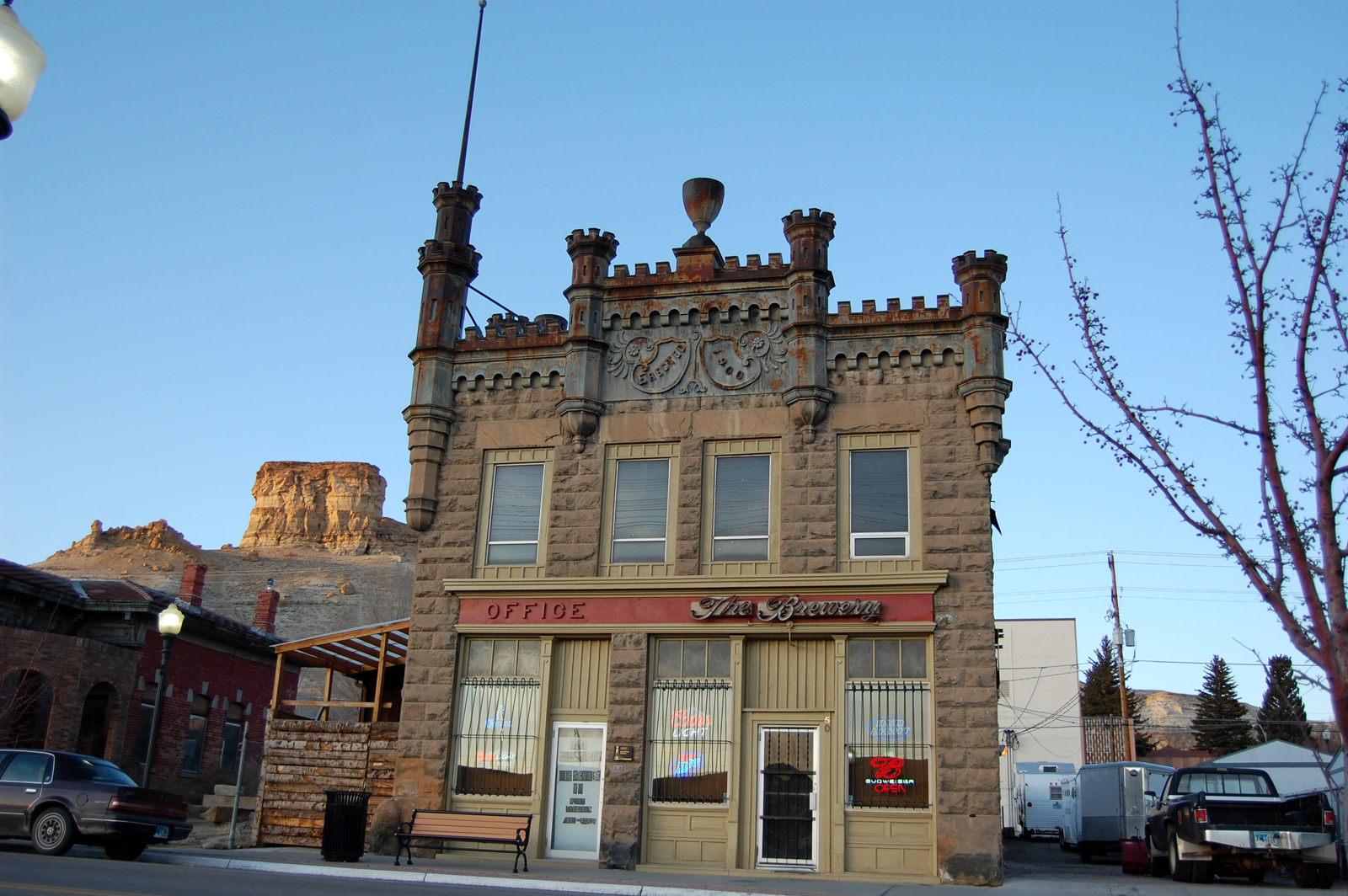
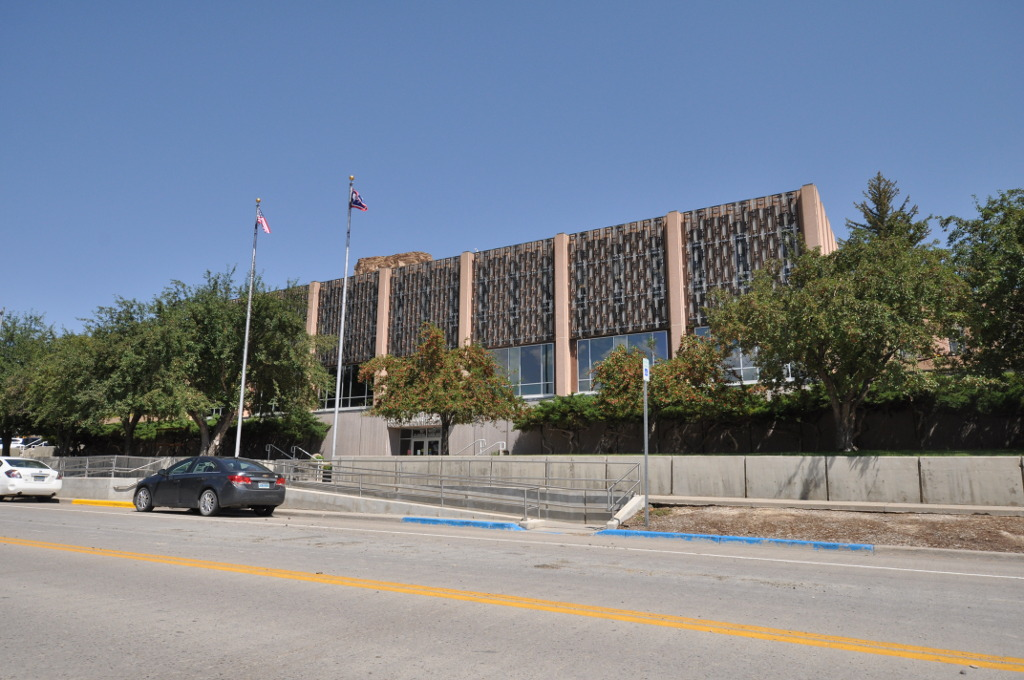
- Downtown Green River Expedition Island Sweetwater Brewery Sweetwater County Courthouse

- Location of Green River in Sweetwater County, Wyoming
- Coordinates: 41°30′23″N 109°28′25″W
- Country: United States
- State: Wyoming
- County: Sweetwater

Area
  - Total: 14.11 sq mi (36.54 km^{2})
  - Land: 13.81 sq mi (35.76 km^{2})
  - Water: 0.30 sq mi (0.78 km^{2})
- Elevation: 6,115 ft (1,864 m)

Population (2020)
  - Total: 11,825
  - Density: 851.6/sq mi (328.81/km^{2})
- Time zone: UTC−7 (Mountain (MST))
  - Summer (DST): UTC−6 (MDT)
- ZIP codes: 82935, 82938
- Area code: 307
- FIPS code: 56-33740
- GNIS feature ID: 2410656
- Website: City of Green River

Green River is a city in and the county seat of Sweetwater County, Wyoming, United States, in the southwestern part of the state. The population was 11,825 at the 2020 census. It is the seventh-most populous city in Wyoming.

== History ==
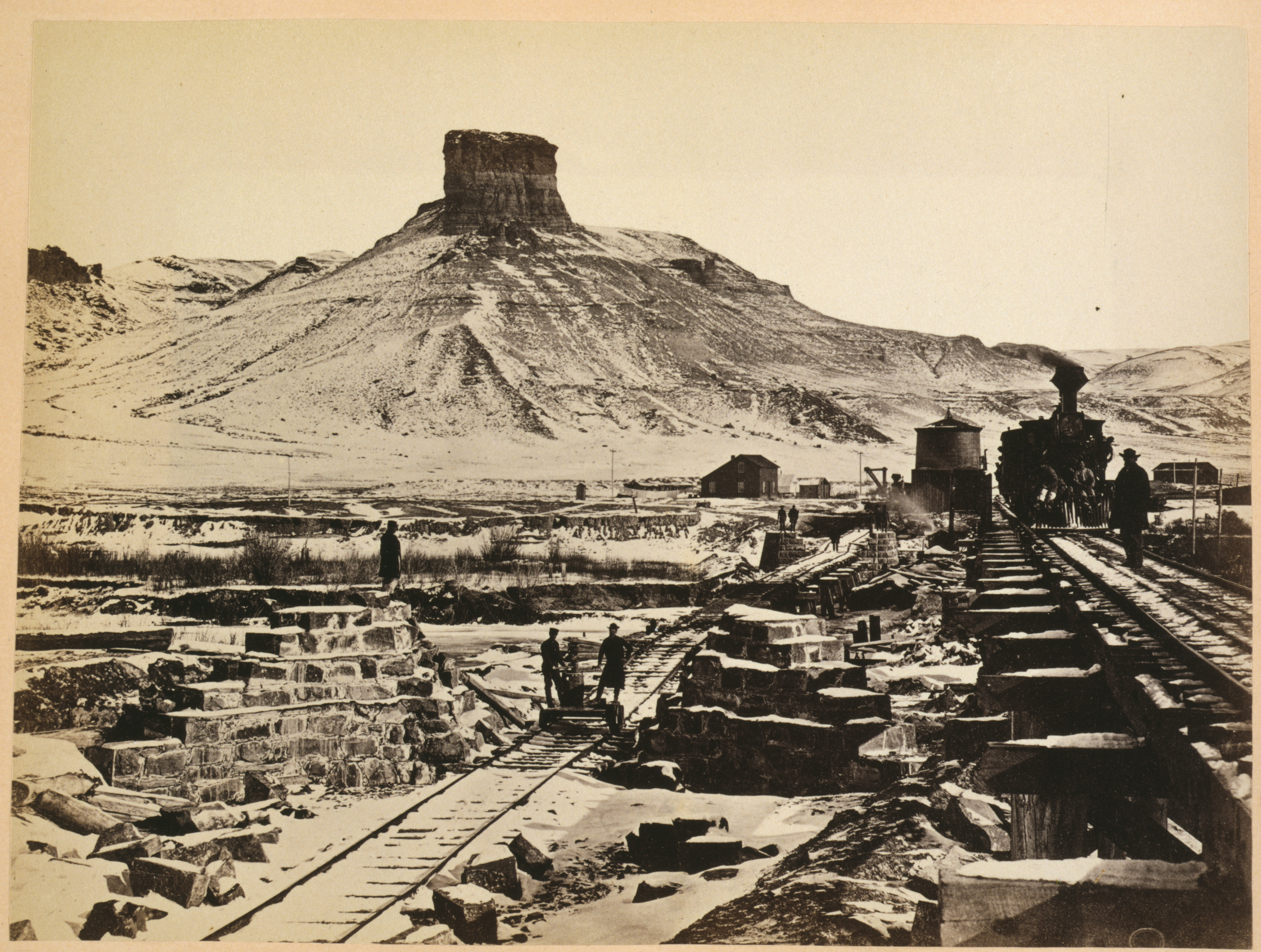
Construction of railroad bridge over Green River, 1868

The townsite of Green River, Dakota Territory was platted by the Union Pacific Railroad in 1867. Although the Territory of Wyoming was created on July 25, 1868, the Town of Green River was incorporated on August 21,1868 under the laws of the previous Territory of Dakota since the laws of the Wyoming Territory had yet to be written. The Town of Green River was re-incorporated on June 10, 1891 under the laws of the State of Wyoming to remove any ambiguity.

The Union Pacific Railroad reached Green River on October 1, 1868, and was supposed to be the site of a division point for the railroad. Railroad officials were surprised to find that a town of 2000 residents and permanent adobe buildings had been established there, likely requiring costly negotiations for railroad land. They moved the division point 12 miles (19 km) west, creating the town of Bryan, on the Blacks Fork of the Green River. Just when Green River was on the verge of becoming a ghost town, Blacks Fork dried up during a drought and the railroad was forced to move the division point back to Green River to ensure adequate water for its steam locomotives. Bryan became the ghost town.

On May 24, 1869, John Wesley Powell launched the Powell Geographic Expedition from Green River.

On November 16, 1931, the Town of Green River passed the Green River ordinance that prohibited door-to-door selling. Other towns across the country would adopt the ordinance.

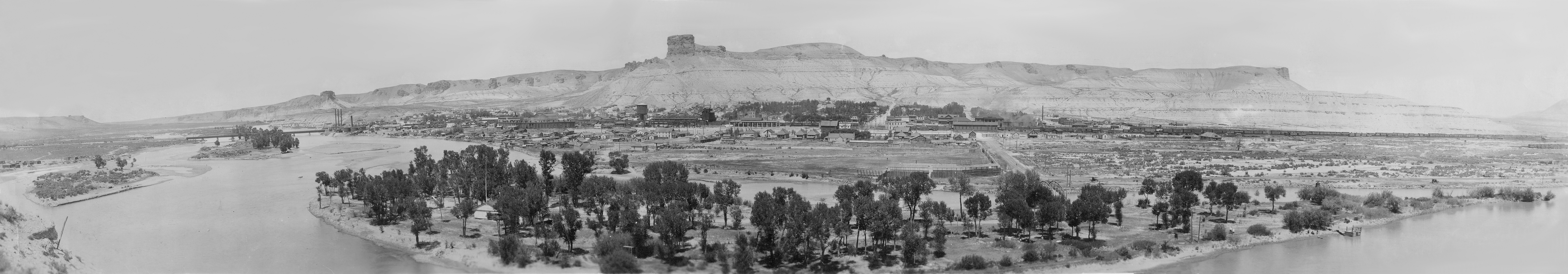
Green River, 1919

== Geography ==
According to the United States Census Bureau, the city has a total area of 14.02 square miles (36.31 km^{2}), of which 13.73 square miles (35.56 km^{2}) is land and 0.29 square miles (0.75 km^{2}) is water.

=== Climate ===
According to the Köppen Climate Classification system, Green River has a cold semi-arid climate, abbreviated "BSk" on climate maps. The hottest temperature recorded in Green River was 104 °F (40 °C) on July 8, 1954, while the coldest temperature recorded was −42 °F (−41 °C) on December 31, 1978.

Climate data for Green River, Wyoming, 1991–2020 normals, extremes 1897–present
Month	Jan	Feb	Mar	Apr	May	Jun	Jul	Aug	Sep	Oct	Nov	Dec	Year
Record high °F (°C)	59 (15)	68 (20)	84 (29)	86 (30)	94 (34)	103 (39)	104 (40)	100 (38)	98 (37)	89 (32)	73 (23)	66 (19)	104 (40)
Mean maximum °F (°C)	47.9 (8.8)	53.3 (11.8)	64.6 (18.1)	75.1 (23.9)	83.7 (28.7)	92.2 (33.4)	96.2 (35.7)	94.5 (34.7)	89.6 (32.0)	78.6 (25.9)	63.6 (17.6)	49.4 (9.7)	96.8 (36.0)
Mean daily maximum °F (°C)	31.0 (−0.6)	36.1 (2.3)	47.1 (8.4)	56.4 (13.6)	66.2 (19.0)	78.1 (25.6)	86.6 (30.3)	85.0 (29.4)	75.7 (24.3)	60.7 (15.9)	43.9 (6.6)	32.0 (0.0)	58.2 (14.6)
Daily mean °F (°C)	19.6 (−6.9)	24.5 (−4.2)	34.8 (1.6)	42.8 (6.0)	51.9 (11.1)	61.8 (16.6)	69.7 (20.9)	67.9 (19.9)	58.3 (14.6)	45.5 (7.5)	31.4 (−0.3)	20.9 (−6.2)	44.1 (6.7)
Mean daily minimum °F (°C)	8.1 (−13.3)	12.9 (−10.6)	22.5 (−5.3)	29.3 (−1.5)	37.6 (3.1)	45.5 (7.5)	52.9 (11.6)	50.7 (10.4)	40.9 (4.9)	30.3 (−0.9)	19.0 (−7.2)	9.8 (−12.3)	30.0 (−1.1)
Mean minimum °F (°C)	−13.4 (−25.2)	−9.0 (−22.8)	6.0 (−14.4)	17.9 (−7.8)	25.4 (−3.7)	34.2 (1.2)	43.9 (6.6)	40.4 (4.7)	29.9 (−1.2)	14.8 (−9.6)	1.1 (−17.2)	−7.9 (−22.2)	−17.9 (−27.7)
Record low °F (°C)	−40 (−40)	−41 (−41)	−26 (−32)	−2 (−19)	13 (−11)	22 (−6)	31 (−1)	23 (−5)	4 (−16)	−9 (−23)	−19 (−28)	−42 (−41)	−42 (−41)
Average precipitation inches (mm)	0.69 (18)	0.51 (13)	0.84 (21)	1.32 (34)	1.67 (42)	0.92 (23)	0.49 (12)	0.64 (16)	0.87 (22)	1.04 (26)	0.69 (18)	0.63 (16)	10.31 (261)
Average snowfall inches (cm)	6.3 (16)	7.6 (19)	5.4 (14)	3.9 (9.9)	0.9 (2.3)	0.0 (0.0)	0.0 (0.0)	0.0 (0.0)	0.3 (0.76)	2.4 (6.1)	5.0 (13)	6.7 (17)	38.5 (98.06)
Average precipitation days (≥ 0.01 in)	5.2	4.8	6.2	7.4	9.1	4.9	4.6	5.4	6.1	6.0	5.1	5.8	70.6
Average snowy days (≥ 0.1 in)	4.9	4.7	3.4	2.3	0.4	0.0	0.0	0.0	0.1	1.4	3.7	5.1	26.0
Source 1: NOAA
Source 2: National Weather Service

== Demographics ==
Historical population
Census	Pop.	Note	%±
1870	106		—
1880	327		208.5%
1890	723		121.1%
1900	1,361		88.2%
1910	1,313		−3.5%
1920	2,140		63.0%
1930	2,589		21.0%
1940	2,640		2.0%
1950	3,187		20.7%
1960	3,497		9.7%
1970	4,196		20.0%
1980	12,807		205.2%
1990	12,711		−0.7%
2000	11,808		−7.1%
2010	12,515		6.0%
2020	11,825		−5.5%

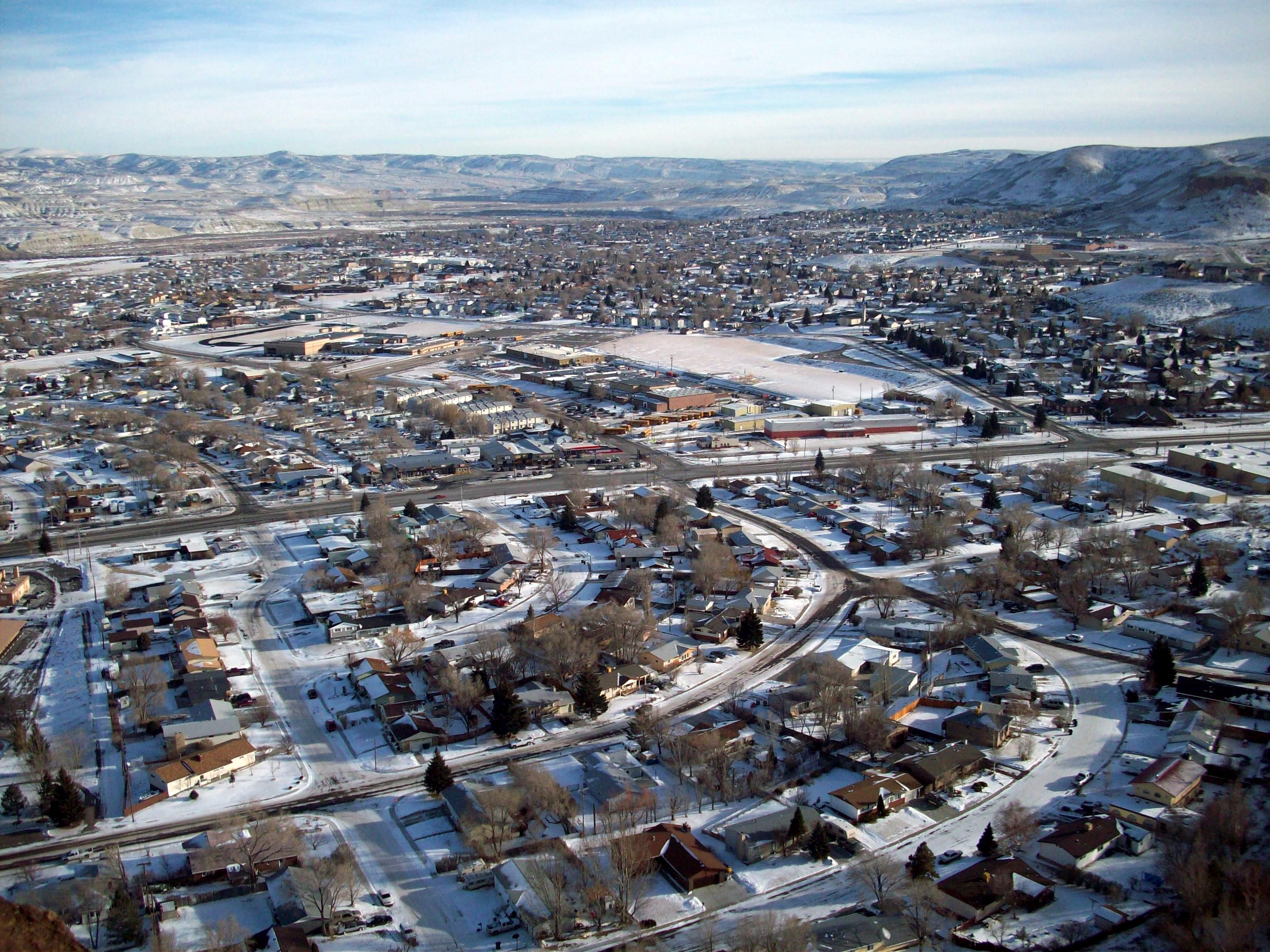
Southeast Green River, from Mansface Hill

=== 2020 census ===
As of the 2020 census, Green River had a population of 11,825. The median age was 37.5 years. 27.8% of residents were under the age of 18 and 14.6% of residents were 65 years of age or older. For every 100 females there were 100.7 males, and for every 100 females age 18 and over there were 99.9 males age 18 and over.

97.1% of residents lived in urban areas, while 2.9% lived in rural areas.

There were 4,548 households in Green River, of which 35.6% had children under the age of 18 living in them. Of all households, 55.4% were married-couple households, 17.7% were households with a male householder and no spouse or partner present, and 19.8% were households with a female householder and no spouse or partner present. About 24.7% of all households were made up of individuals and 9.5% had someone living alone who was 65 years of age or older.

There were 5,011 housing units, of which 9.2% were vacant. The homeowner vacancy rate was 1.7% and the rental vacancy rate was 17.4%.

Racial composition as of the 2020 census
Race	Number	Percent
White	9,935	84.0%
Black or African American	55	0.5%
American Indian and Alaska Native	94	0.8%
Asian	68	0.6%
Native Hawaiian and Other Pacific Islander	20	0.2%
Some other race	482	4.1%
Two or more races	1,171	9.9%
Hispanic or Latino (of any race)	1,586	13.4%

=== 2010 census ===
As of the census of 2010, there were 12,515 people, 4,642 households, and 3,406 families living in the city. The population density was 911.5 inhabitants per square mile (351.9/km^{2}). There were 5,002 housing units at an average density of 364.3 per square mile (140.7/km^{2}). The racial makeup of the city was 92.1% White, 0.4% African American, 0.8% Native American, 0.5% Asian, 0.1% Pacific Islander, 4.1% from other races, and 2.0% from two or more races. Hispanic or Latino of any race were 13.4% of the population.

There were 4,642 households, of which 39.0% had children under the age of 18 living with them, 59.4% were married couples living together, 7.9% had a female householder with no husband present, 6.0% had a male householder with no wife present, and 26.6% were non-families. 21.6% of all households were made up of individuals, and 5.7% had someone living alone who was 65 years of age or older. The average household size was 2.68 and the average family size was 3.12.

The median age in the city was 33.9 years. 28.4% of residents were under the age of 18; 8.2% were between the ages of 18 and 24; 26.6% were from 25 to 44; 28.1% were from 45 to 64; and 8.6% were 65 years of age or older. The gender makeup of the city was 51.6% male and 48.4% female.

=== 2000 census ===
As of the census of 2000, there were 11,808 people, 4,177 households, and 3,212 families living in the city. The population density was 861.5 people per square mile (332.5/km^{2}). There were 4,426 housing units at an average density of 322.9 per square mile (124.6/km^{2}). The racial makeup of the city was 92.13% White, 0.27% African American, 1.36% Native American, 0.32% Asian, 0.06% Pacific Islander, 4.23% from other races, and 1.63% from two or more races. Hispanic or Latino of any race were 10.21% of the population.

There were 4,177 households, out of which 42.5% had children under the age of 18 living with them, 64.4% were married couples living together, 8.4% had a female householder with no husband present, and 23.1% were non-families. 19.3% of all households were made up of individuals, and 6.0% had someone living alone who was 65 years of age or older. The average household size was 2.80 and the average family size was 3.22.

In the city, the population was spread out, with 31.1% under the age of 18, 8.8% from 18 to 24, 28.9% from 25 to 44, 24.8% from 45 to 64, and 6.5% who were 65 years of age or older. The median age was 34 years. For every 100 females, there were 102.8 males. For every 100 females age 18 and over, there were 100.7 males.

The median income for a household in the city was $53,164, and the median income for a family was $59,100. Males had a median income of $51,418 versus $24,306 for females. The per capita income for the city was $20,398. About 3.1% of families and 4.5% of the population were below the poverty line, including 6.0% of those under age 18 and 5.3% of those age 65 or over.

== Economy ==
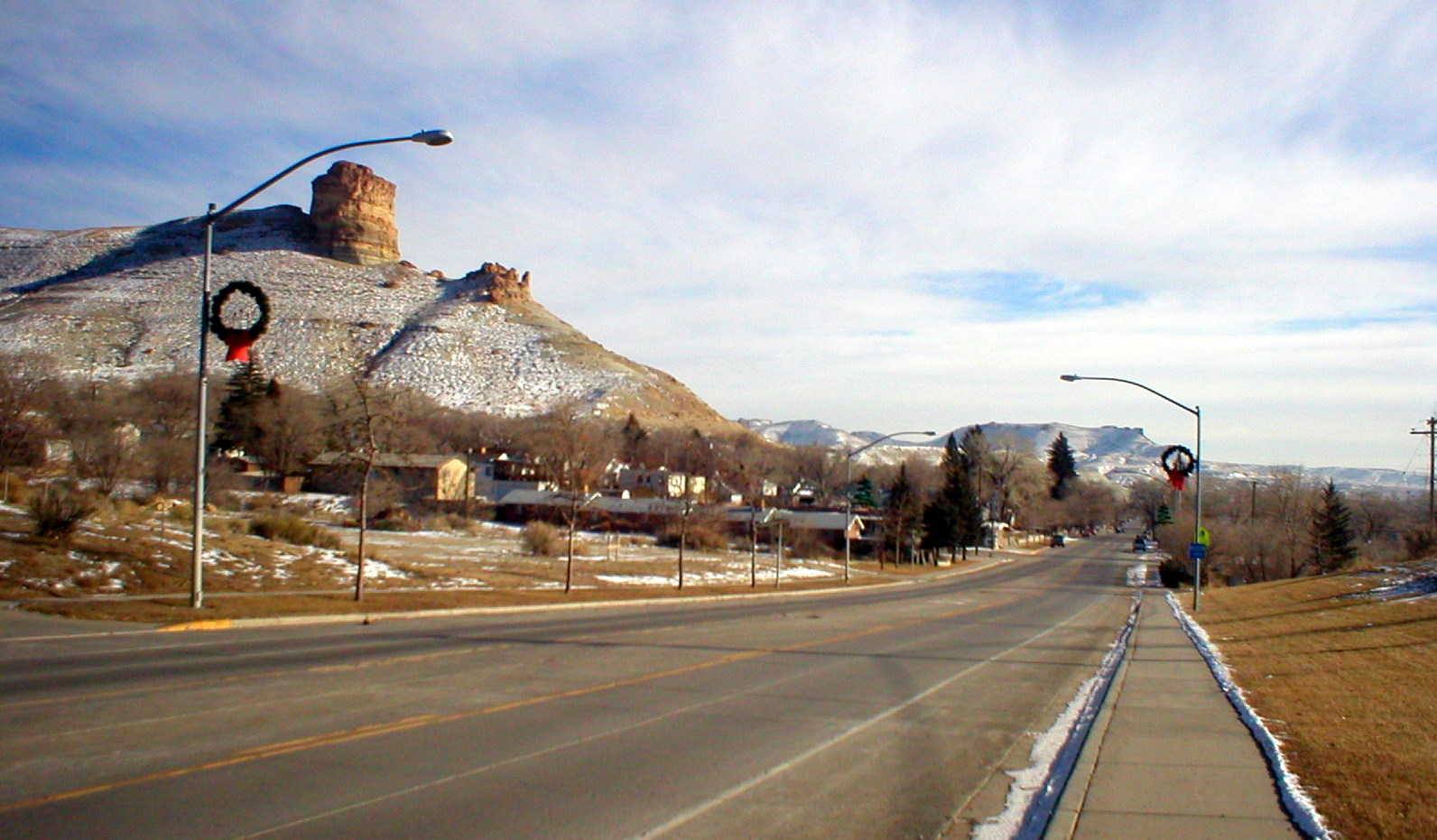
Green River, looking east

The Green River Basin contains the world's largest known deposit of trona ore. Soda ash mining from trona veins 900 and 1,600 feet (490 m) deep is a major industrial activity in the area, employing over 2000 persons at five mines. The mining operation is less expensive for production of soda ash in the United States than the synthetic Solvay process, which predominates in the rest of the world. The trona in Sweetwater County was created by an ancient body of water known as Lake Gosiute. Over time, the lake shrank. With the loss of outflows, highly alkaline water (salt brine) began to evaporate, depositing the beds of trona.

The four mines are run by these companies:

- Tata Chemicals Ltd., (formerly General Chemical)
- Genesis Alkali LLC
- Sisecam Wyoming (formerly Ciner Resources LP, formerly OCI, formerly Stauffer Chemical Company)
- Solvay Chemicals Inc.
- Tronox (formerly FMC Westvaco)

The Green River Basin also has large oil shale and natural gas reserves, which remain virtually untouched due to the high cost of extracting the oil from the hard shale formations. However, an increase in oil prices in 2008 and a national desire to become more energy independent led to an increase in well drilling and oil exploration. Expansion growth from Halliburton and Exxon, as well as other oil companies, created a mini-boom for Green River and its sister city, Rock Springs.

The 80MW Sweetwater Solar project near Green River is "the first utility-scale solar farm" in Wyoming. It was slated to come online in 2019. Concerns have been raised about its impact on antelope migration.

== Arts and culture ==
=== Flaming Gorge Days ===
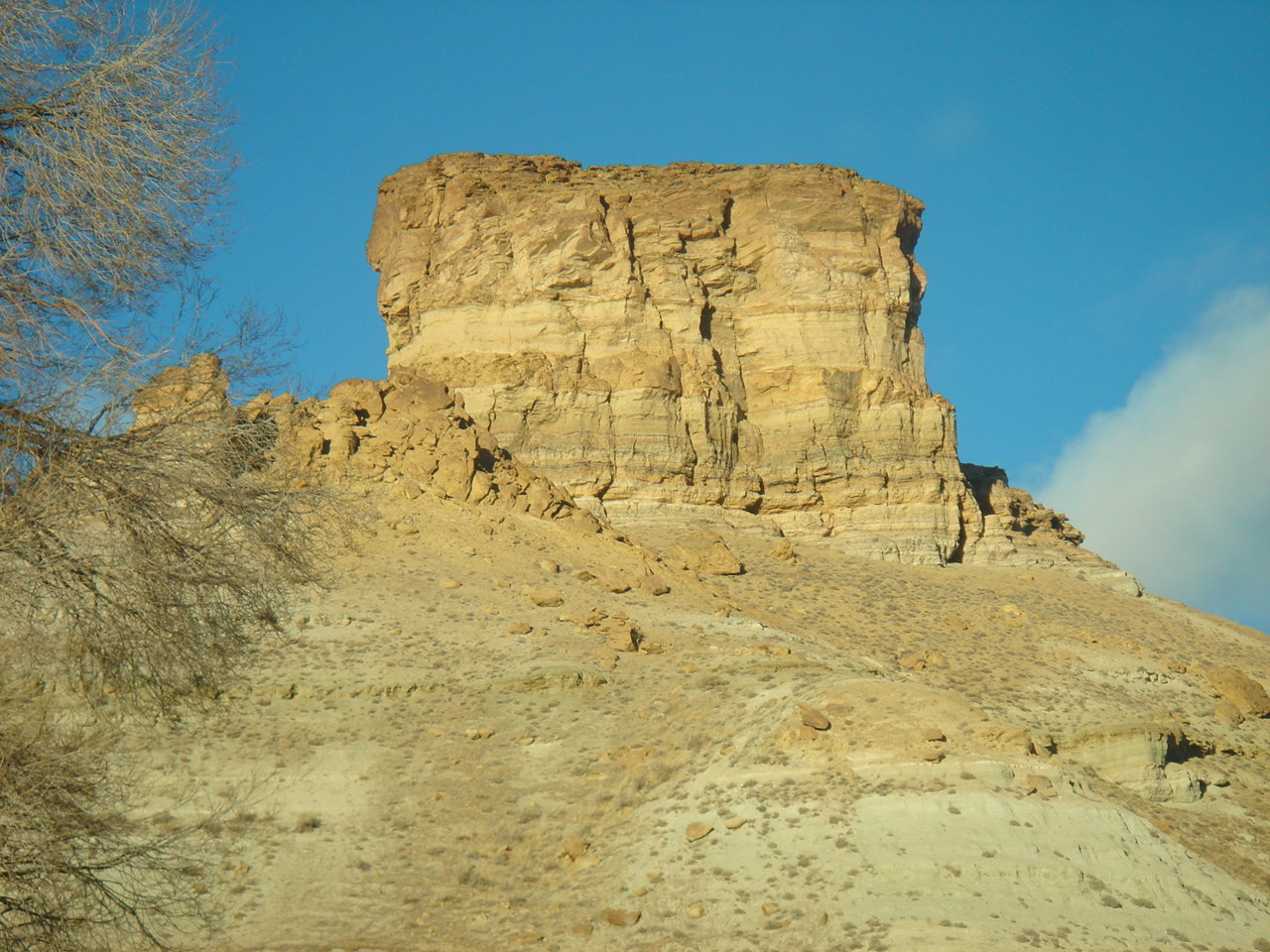
Castle Rock

Every year, on the last full weekend of June, Green River hosts Flaming Gorge Days. The festival features concerts, 3-on-3 basketball, Red Desert Road Runner 5K race, Festival in the Park, among other activities. Past musical performances at the festival have included Poison, Tesla, Everclear, Head East, Neal McCoy, REO Speedwagon, Josh Gracin, Chris LeDoux and Trick Pony.

== Government ==
Green River's government consists of a six-member city council, each of whom are elected from one of three wards. Each ward elects two members. The mayor is elected in a citywide vote. The city council was criticized in 2007 for its handling of a smoking ban, which caused several residents to question the council's motives.

The Mayor of Green River is Pete Rust, who was elected in November 2014.

== Education ==
Public education in the City of Green River is provided by Sweetwater County School District #2. Schools serving the city include: Harrison Elementary, Truman Elementary, Washington Elementary, Monroe Intermediate School, Lincoln Middle School, and Green River High School. There is also one alternative high school campus - Expedition Academy.

Western Wyoming Community College is located in nearby Rock Springs and maintains an extension center in Green River.

Green River has a public library, a branch of the Sweetwater County Library System.

== Media ==
Green River is served by two print publications: The Green River Star (a weekly newspaper published in Green River) and the Rock Springs Daily Rocket-Miner.

Four larger radio stations originate from Green River, three FM stations (KYCS, KZWB and KFRZ) as well as one AM station (KUGR). Stations from Rock Springs, Wyoming can also be heard in Green River.

== Infrastructure ==
=== Transportation ===
Green River lies along Interstate 80 (I-80), a major transcontinental freeway that crosses southern Wyoming. It was designated in 1956 and constructed in phases to replace U.S. Route 30, the previous transcontinental highway on the corridor. The section around Green River was opened on October 28, 1966, and included the construction of the Green River Tunnel, a pair of tunnels that ran 1,135 feet (346 m). The tunnels closed on February 14, 2025, after a mass collision involving 26 vehicles started a fire that killed 3 people. Other highways in the city include Highway 530, which connects to Flaming Gorge, and Interstate 80 Business, which uses the old route of U.S. Route 30 through Green River.

The city government owns a Greater Green River Intergalactic Spaceport, a public use airstrip 5 miles (8.0 km) south of the town on Highway 530. It was originally named Green River 48U for its Federal Aviation Administration identifier until 1994, when the city council passed a resolution to designate the airport as a spaceport. The same resolution included language with an "offer of sanctuary" to residents of Jupiter due to the impending collision of Comet Shoemaker–Levy 9. The airport has a 5,000-foot (1,500 m) runway and a commemorative sign that has been replaced several times due to theft.

== Notable people ==
- Curt Gowdy (1919–2006), sports announcer
- Heather Moody (born 1973), Olympic water polo silver and bronze medalist
- Nick Mamalis (born 1986), mixed martial artist who competed in the Bantamweight division
- Justin Salas (born 1982), mixed martial artist who competed as a lightweight in Ultimate Fighting Championship from 2012 to 2016
- Marlene Tromp (born 1966), English literature scholar and 7th president of Boise State University
