= Boars Tusk =

Geological feature in Wyoming, United States

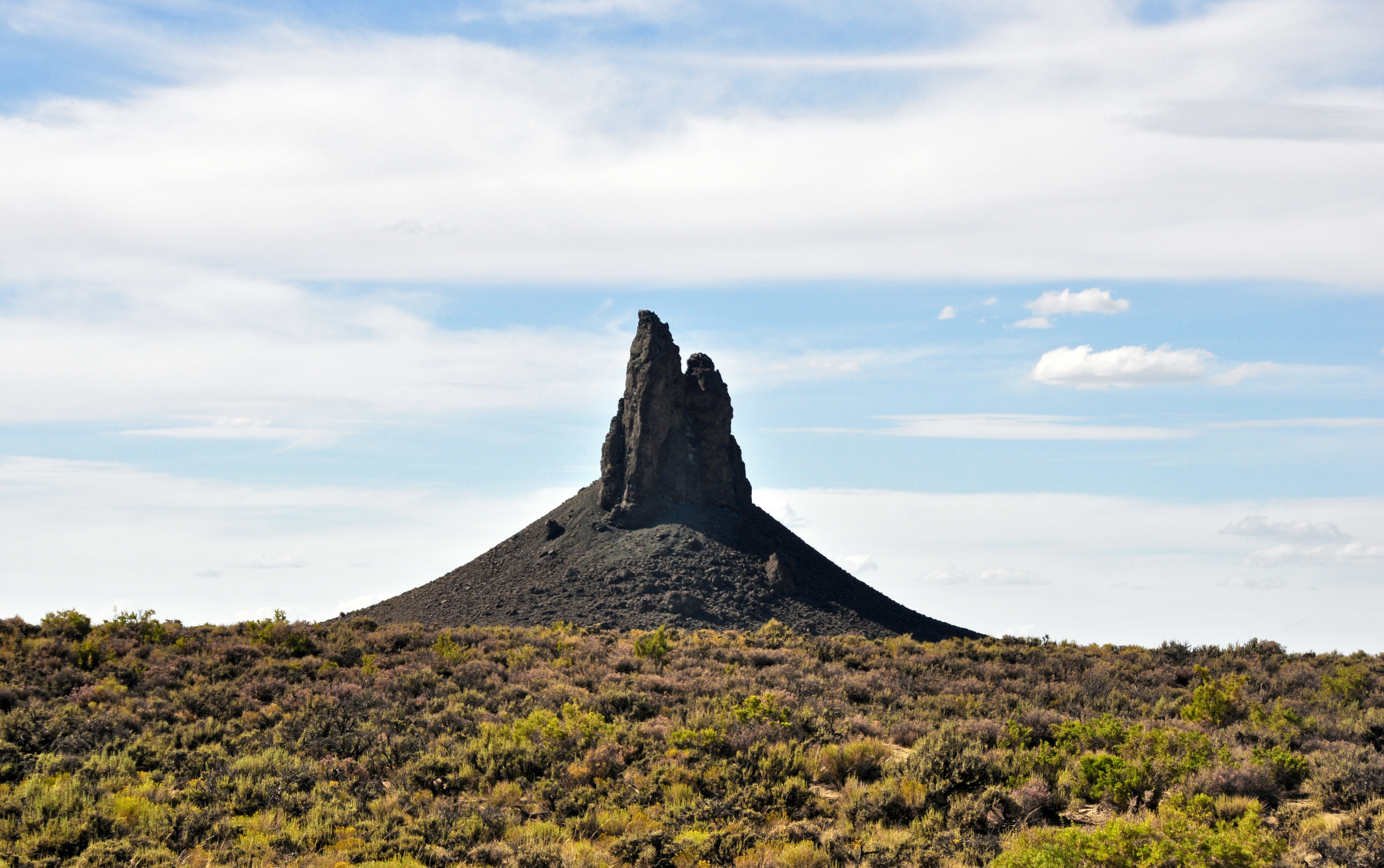

Highest point
- Elevation: 7,101 ft (2,164 m)
- Prominence: 397 ft (121 m)
- Coordinates: 41°57′46″N 109°11′50″W

Geography
- Location within Wyoming Location within the United States
- Location: Sweetwater County, Wyoming, U.S.
- Parent range: Leucite Hills
- Topo map: USGS Boars Tusk

Boars Tusk is an isolated remains of a volcano within the Rock Springs Uplift in the Green River Basin of southwestern Wyoming. It has a peak elevation of 7,101 ft (2,164 m) and rises some 400 ft (120 m) above the surrounding Killpecker Creek plain and lies 26.2 mi (42.2 km) north of Rock Springs. The north end of White Mountain lies 3.0 mi (4.8 km) to the west.

Boars Tusk is an isolated remnant of a long extinct volcano associated with the Leucite Hills to the east. The area was active roughly 2.5 million years ago during the Early Pleistocene epoch. All that remains of the volcano is part of the erosion resistant volcanic neck which is composed of the uncommon volcanic rock lamproite, specifically a variety called Wyomingite. Rock samples from Boars Tusk provided an age of 2.5 MA.

Wyomingite is characterized by a mineral assembly of leucite, phlogopite mica, and diopside pyroxene, and is frequently found as a volcanic breccia—a rock composed of broken fragments of minerals or rock cemented together by a fine-grained matrix. Geochemically, these lamproites are mafic and are believed to have originated from deep within the Earth's mantle, possibly triggered by "fringe melting" associated with the Yellowstone Hotspot. This unique composition makes Boars Tusk and the neighboring Leucite Hills a site of significant interest for petrologists studying mantle enrichment and rare volcanic processes in North America.
