= White Mountain (Wyoming) =

Mountain in Sweetwater County, Wyoming, United States

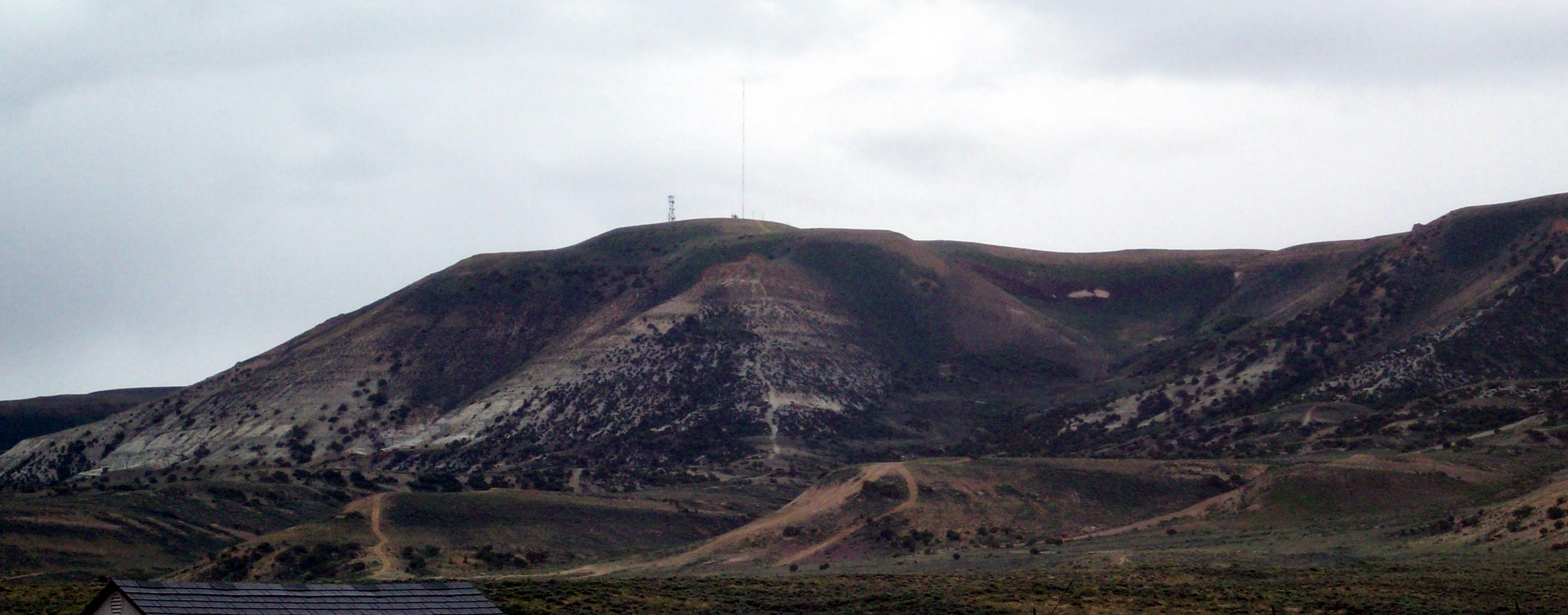
- White Mountain's highest point (minus Pilot Butte) located near Rock Springs, Wyoming

Highest point
- Elevation: 7,623 ft (2,323 m)
- Coordinates: 41°34′41″N 109°19′12″W

Geography
- Location: Sweetwater County, Wyoming, U.S.

Climbing
- Easiest route: Roads from Rock Springs and Green River

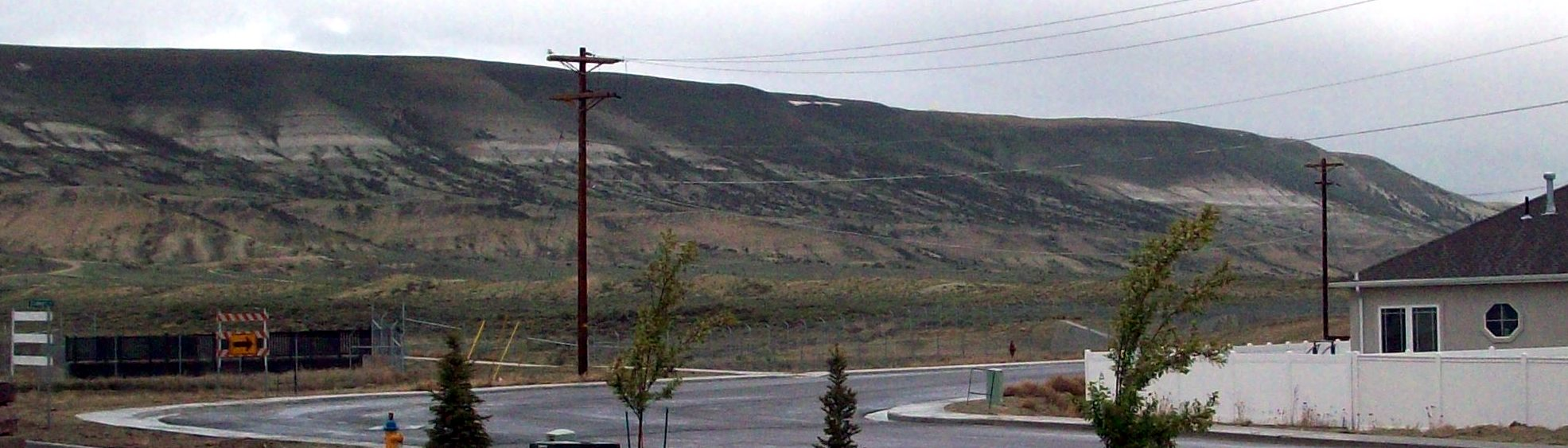
The central portion of the mountain, from Rock Springs, Wyoming

White Mountain is a long mountain located in central Sweetwater County, Wyoming, near the cities of Rock Springs and Green River. The mountain is part of the Green River Formation, and contains communications towers that serve a number of purposes. Hundreds of carved figures also dot the sandstone cliffs at the White Mountain Petroglyph site and range from 200 to 1,000 years old. Pilot Butte, located on top of White Mountain, is accessible from roads on the mountain.

== Geology ==
Like its neighbor, Wilkins Peak, White Mountain is a member of the Green River Formation, technically a plateau & aformation of the intermontane Lake Gosiute environment during the Eocene epoch. White Mountain is part of the Rock Springs Uplift, and some of the largest oil shale and trona beds in the region are located west of the mountain. White Mountain contains sediment from a subcategory of the Green River Formation, known as the Wilkins Peak Formation. White Mountain is part of the Leucite Hills topography of southwestern Wyoming.

The peak itself is 7,623 feet (2,323 m) in elevation and is located 5.4 miles (9 km) from Rock Springs, Wyoming and 8.85 miles (14 km) from Green River, Wyoming.

== Communication uses ==
White Mountain houses communication radio towers for several local and regional uses. The local cable company, Sweetwater Television, owns the tallest tower at the center of the mountain. This tower can be seen in the picture above. K28JU-D, the local PBS affiliate of KCWC-DT, broadcasts from space on the tower as well, and as of August 2009, is the only television station broadcasting from White Mountain. Located next to that tower are transmitters used by the local BLM office, as well as a tower for cellular telephones, owned by Union Wireless.

On the side of the mountain facing Green River, two more radio towers are present. One of the towers is used for airport communications from a nearby airport. The other, owned by Verizon Wireless, is used for cellular telephone transmissions.

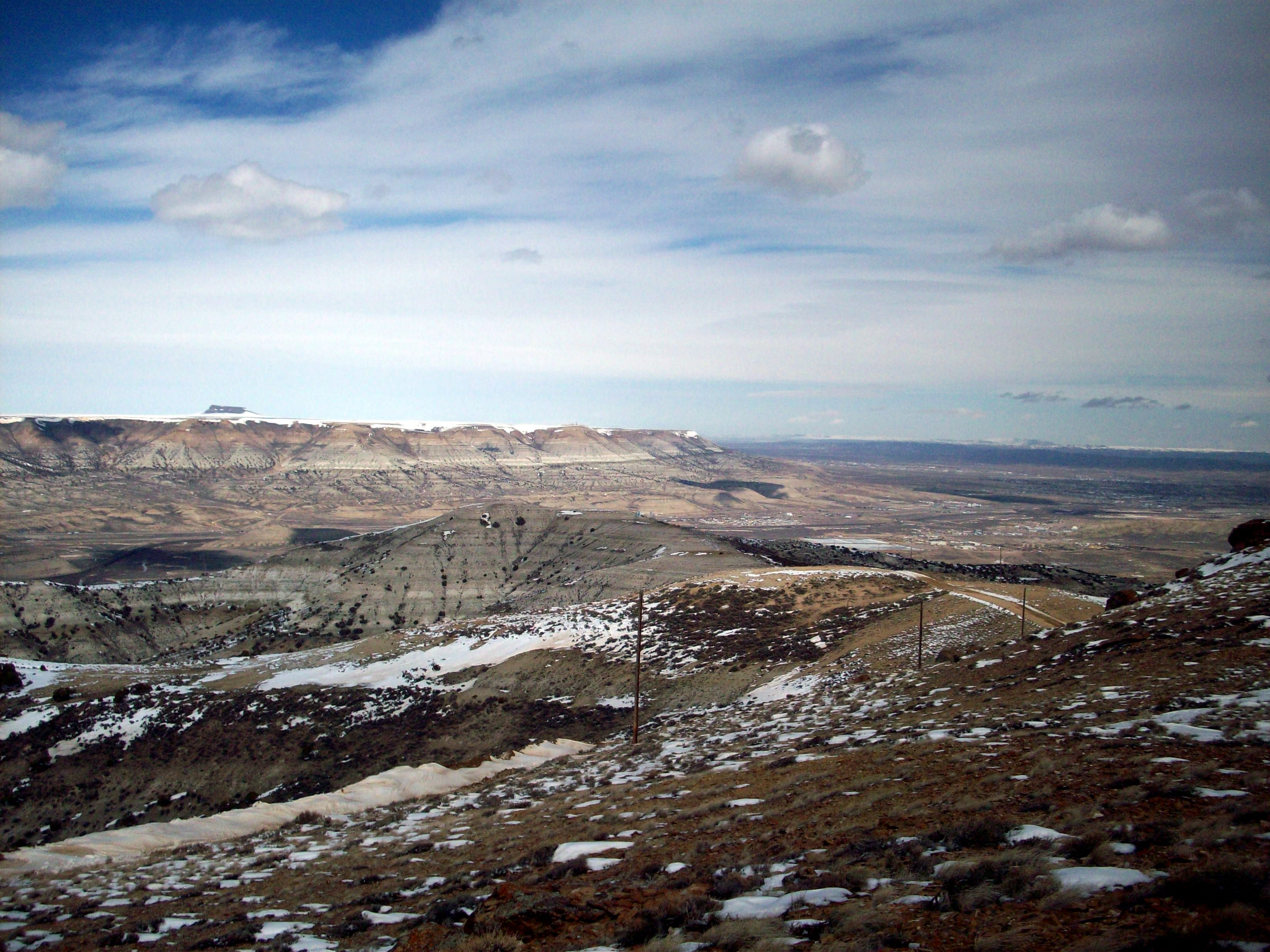
White Mountain, as seen from Wilkins Peak. Pilot Butte is to the left

== Pilot Butte ==
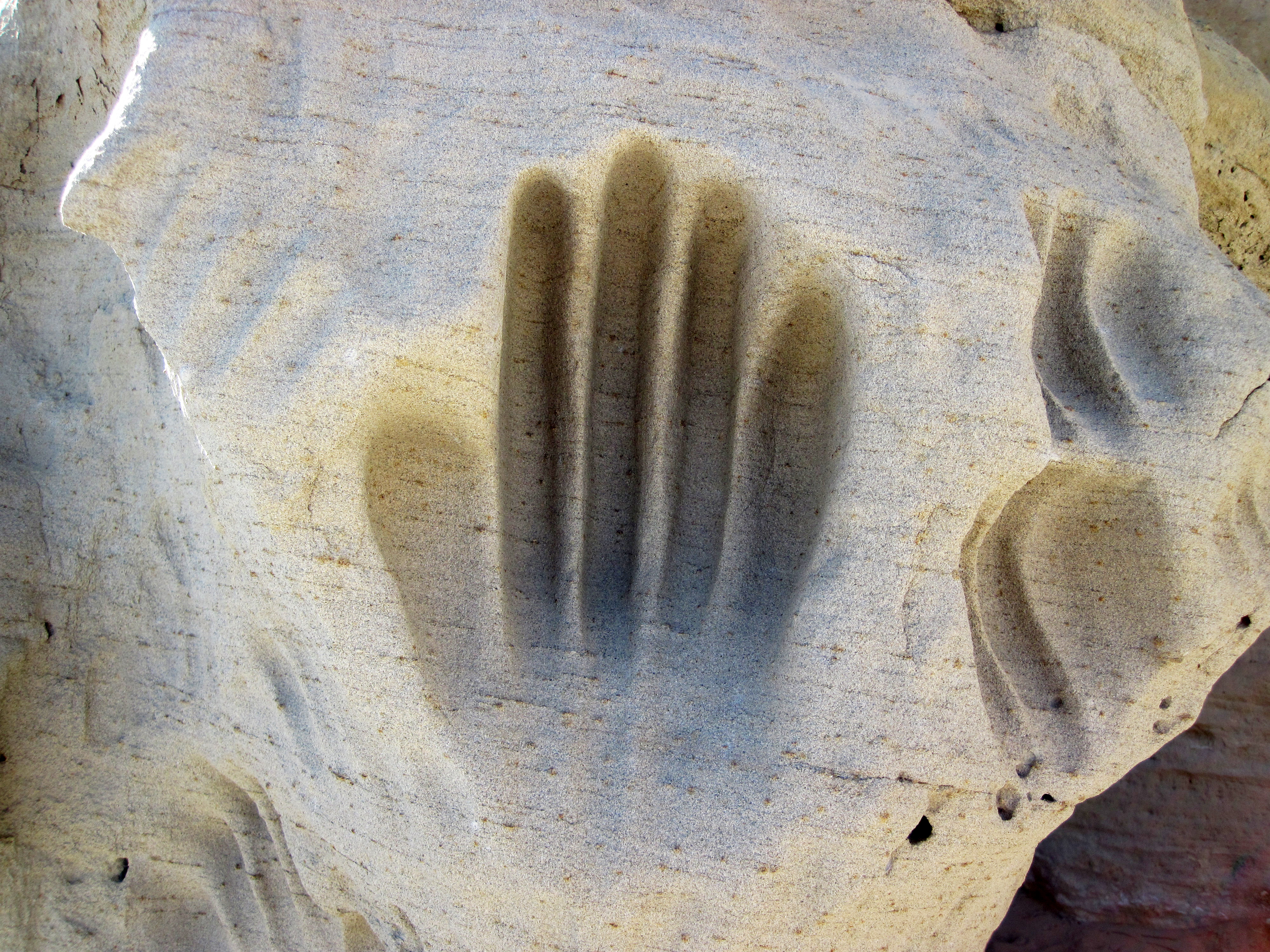
Ancestral Shoshone petroglyphs (White Mountain Petroglyphs), carved into the soft sandstone

Pilot Butte is located directly on top of White Mountain, and was named by early travelers in the region as a signal that they were close to the Green River. Pilot Butte is also a part of the Wild Horse tour, and several herds of wild horses have been spotted in the area. The butte is the second-highest point in the immediate region, the first being Aspen Mountain to the south. It is 7,949 feet (2,423 m) in elevation at its highest point. The butte can be hiked, and used to contain a steel ladder to assist in reaching the summit.

== Petroglyphs ==
Hundreds of carved figures dot the sandstone cliffs at the White Mountain Petroglyph site in Wyoming’s Red Desert. Etched into the stone surface some 200 to 1,000 years ago, several figures appear to portray bison and elk hunts, while others depict geometric forms or tiny footprints. Handprints are worn into the rock as well, providing visitors with a compelling connection to those who used the site long ago.
