= Leucite Hills =

Volcanic field in Wyoming, United States

- Location within Wyoming

Highest point
- Peak: Steamboat Mountain
- Elevation: 8,630 ft (2,630 m)
- Coordinates: 41°52′26″N 108°47′43″W

Geography
- Country: United States
- State: Wyoming
- District: Sweetwater County
- Parent range: Rock Springs Uplift

Geology
- Rock age: Pleistocene
- Rock type: Lamproite

The Leucite Hills are an isolated volcanic field located in Sweetwater County, in southwestern Wyoming. The area is situated on the northern flank of the Rock Springs Uplift within the Green River Basin. Known to petrologists as one of the largest and most significant lamproite provinces in the world, the field consists of 22 distinct volcanic features, including lava-capped mesas, buttes, cinder cones, dikes, and volcanic necks, including Boars Tusk. The lamproite has been named "Wyomingite" in this region. Radiometric dating places eruptive events between 3.0 and 0.89 million years ago. These volcanic eruptions tore through the existing Cretaceous and Teritiary sedimentary rocks, such as the Green River Formation and Wasatch Formation.

The Leucite Hills are the result of "deep-sourced" magmatism, with magma originating from partial melting of the metasomatized Archean mantle at depths exceeding 90 miles. This magmatic activity caused deep crustal fractures, particularly the northwest-trending Farson Lineament. The resulting landforms include prominent landmarks such as Boars Tusk, a 400-foot volcanic neck, and Zirkel Mesa, the largest lava flow in the area.

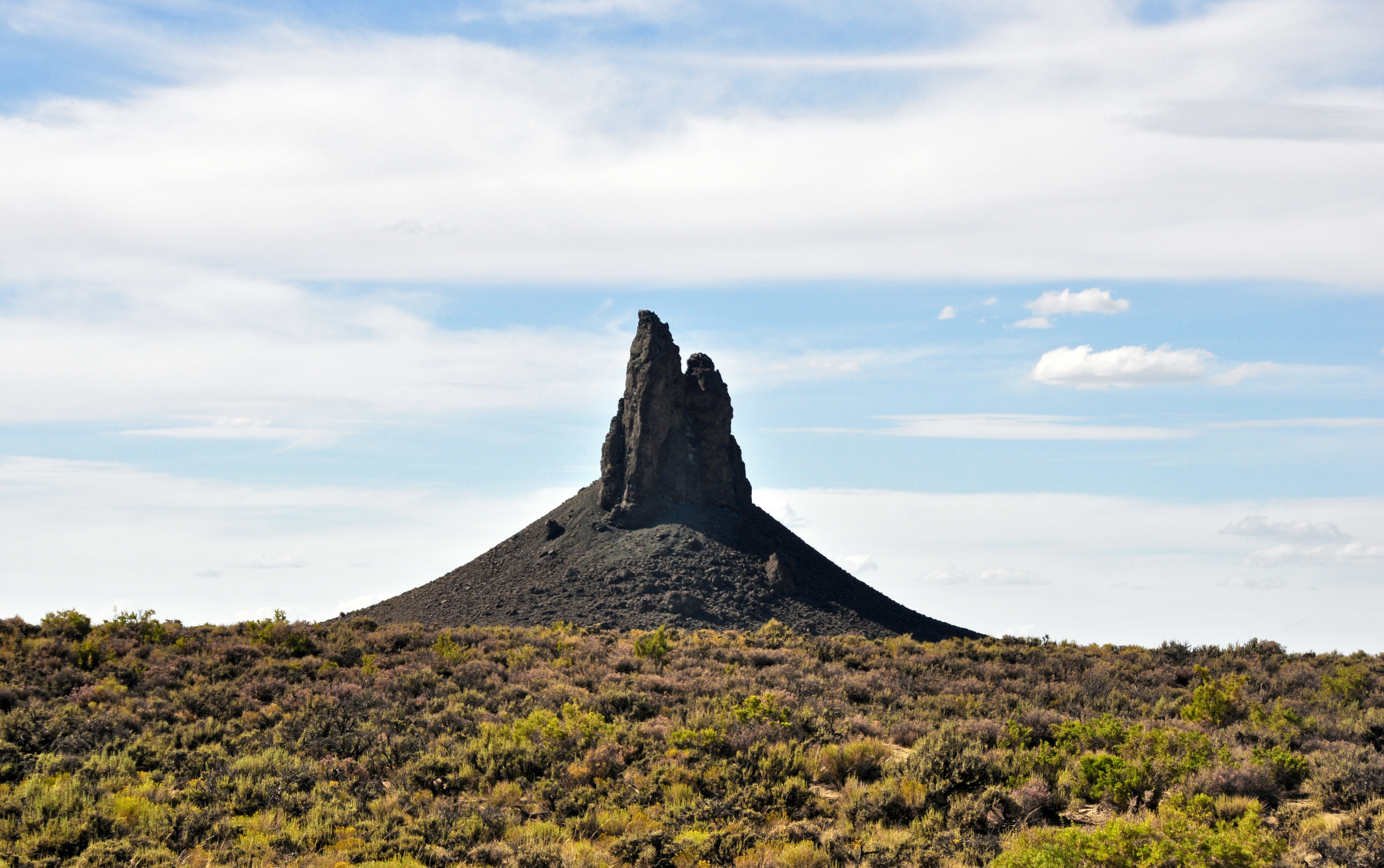
Boars Tusk

Several rare, potassium-rich igneous rocks can be found in the area. These have been historically classified into three main types: Wyomingite, Orendite, and Madupite. Given the high potassium content, the rocks were viewed as a potential domestic source of potash for fertilizer during the early 20th century. The Wyoming State Geological Survey has conducted reconnaissance for diamond potential, as lamproites can host diamonds, though no commercial deposits have been found.

Gem-quality olivine (peridot) has been identified in the northeastern portion of the field.

The surrounding Rock Springs Uplift is a major province for natural gas and coal production.

The Killpecker Sand Dunes are located nearby, part of Wyoming's Red Desert. The Leucite Hills create a natural "gap" or funnel. Prevailing westerly winds carry sand and silt from the Green River Basin and the Wind River Mountains; as these winds are squeezed through the gap between the Leucite Hills and the surrounding uplands, they accelerate and then drop their sediment load on the leeward side, creating the massive dune field.

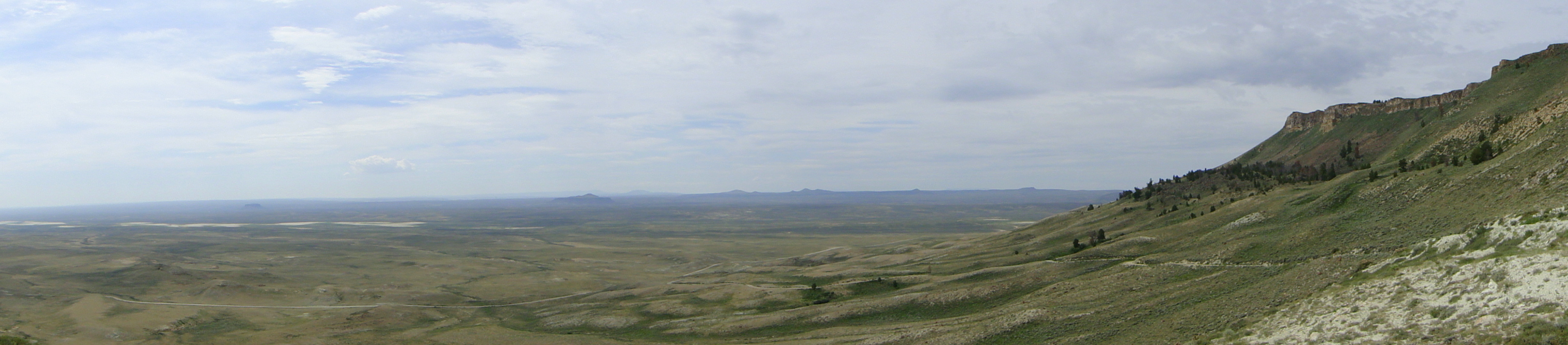
The Red Desert borders the eastern side of the hills. This image was taken near the highest point of the Leucite Hills, Steamboat Mountain.

== Farson Lineament ==
The Farson Lineament is a northwest-trending structural feature in the region. It is a deep-seated basement fracture or shear zone that has played a role in directing volcanic activity and shaping the subsurface architecture of the Green River Basin and the Rock Springs Uplift. Although it is not always visible as a distinct ridge on the surface, its existence is determened through its presence is inferred through geophyscal data and the alignment of volcanic vents in the Leucite Hills. The lineament gets its name from nearby Farson, Wyoming.

The lineament is part of system of Precambrian basement faults, which have been active throughout geologic time particularly during the Laramide Orogeny. It acts as a "conduit of weakness" through the thick North American craton. Approximately 1 to 3 million years ago, this deep fracture allowed ultrapotassic magmas—originating from the metasomatized mantle nearly 100 miles (160 km) below the surface—to bypass the cooler crust and erupt rapidly.
