= Greater Green River Basin =

River basin in southwestern Wyoming, United States

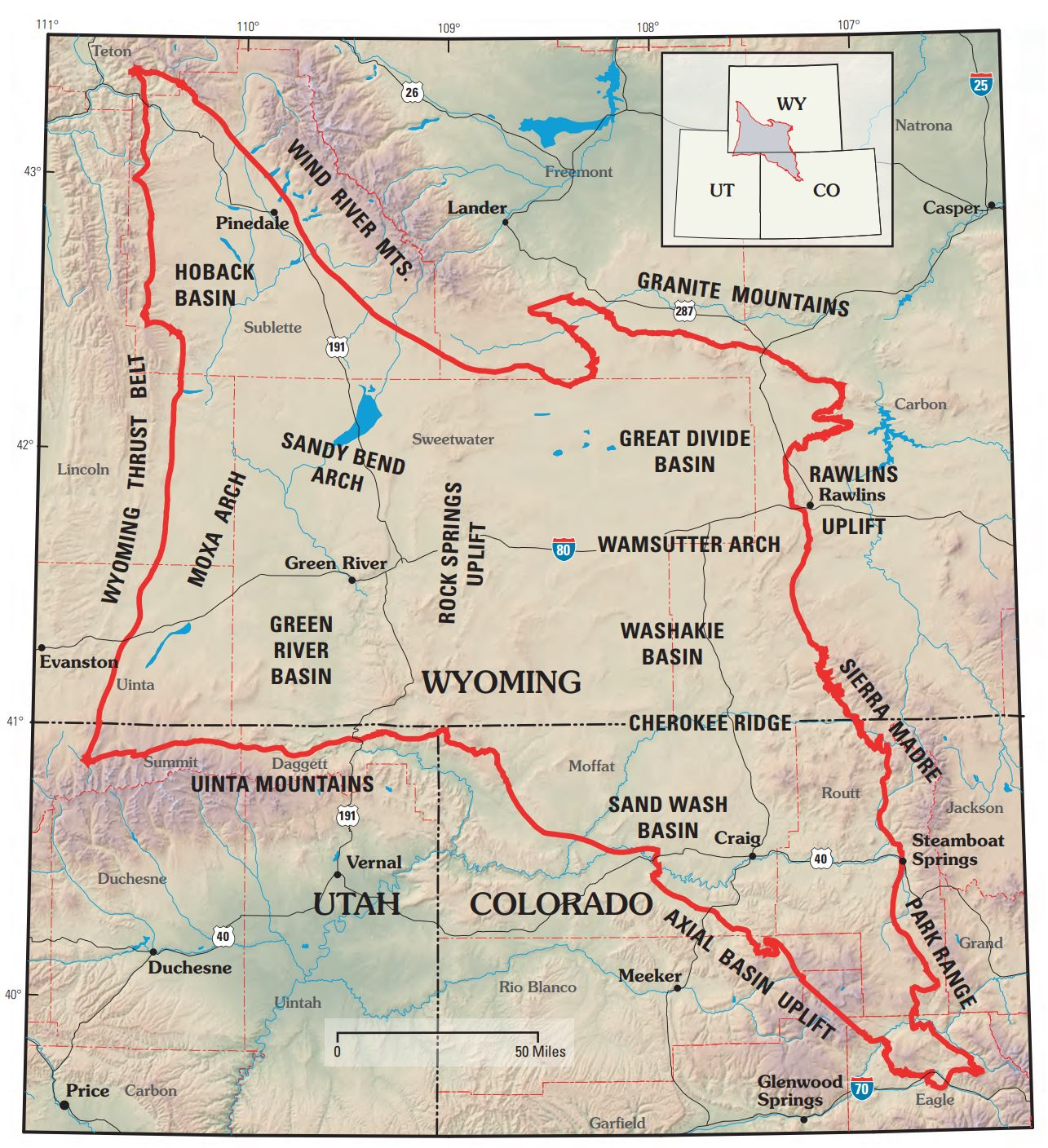
This map shows the border of the Greater Green River Basin, along with the subbasins and arches that make up the overall basin.

The Greater Green River Basin (GGRB) is a 21,000 square mile basin located in Southwestern Wyoming. The Basin was formed during the Cretaceous period sourced by underlying Permian and Cretaceous deposits. The GGRB is host to many anticlines created during the Laramide Orogeny trapping many of its hydrocarbon resources. It is bounded by the Rawlins Uplift, Uinta Mountains, Sevier overthrust belt, Sierra Madre Mountains, and the Wind River Mountain Range. The Greater Green River Basin is subdivided into four smaller basins, the Green River Basin, Great Divide Basin, Washakie Basin, and Sand Wash Basin. Each of these possesses hydrocarbons that have been economically exploited. There are 303 named fields throughout the basin, the majority of which produce natural gas; the largest of these gas fields is the Jonah Field.

== Geologic setting ==
The GGRB was formed during the Laramide Orogeny and is split into an east and west region by the Rock Springs Uplift; an intrabasin anticline uplift that consists of units formed at the end of the Cretaceous into the Eocene. Prior to the basins formation in the Cretaceous, many of the basins source rocks come from the Permian Phosphoria Formation. The Phosphoria Formation of Wyoming was deposited in a Successor Basin (a basin that is formed directly after a tectonic event) that lies between the Sevier Orogeny to the west and the ancient Rocky Mountain orogeny to the east. The Phosphoria Sea was a shallow, sediment starved sea that produced lots of carbonates and phosphorus rich sediments that source many of the hydrocarbon reservoirs found in the Rocky Mountain region today. The Laramide Orogeny was not a single event, but a prolonged tectonic event that had different affects across the large Greater Green River basin. Due to the GGRB size each sub-basin has its own unique geologic history and deposition.

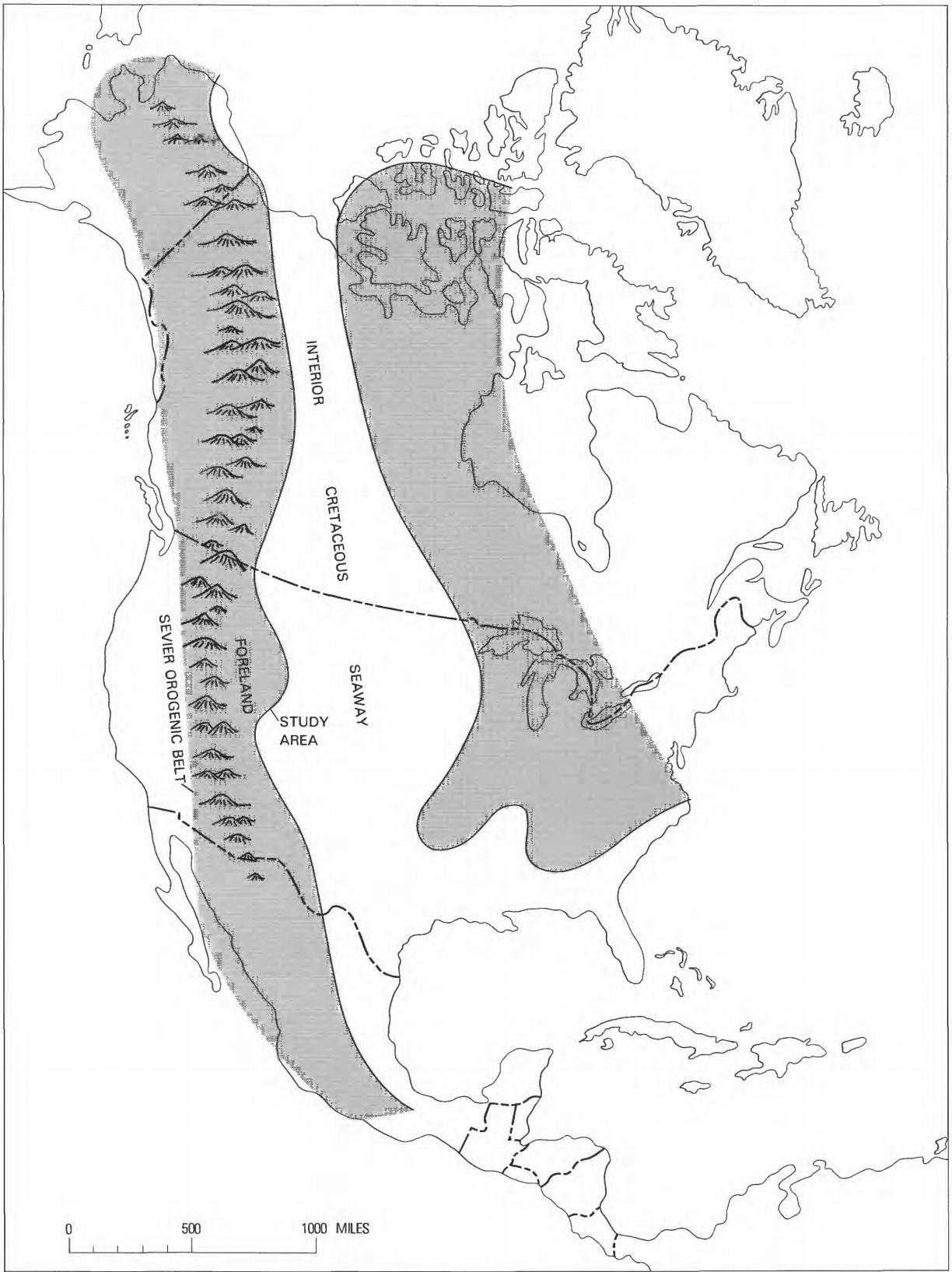
Study area of the Mesaverde Group in the Green River Basin, WY.

=== Rock Springs Uplift ===
The Rock Springs Uplift is a 1,200 square mile asymmetric anticline composed of Late Cretaceous Baxter Shale. This anticlinal uplift separates the Green River Basin to the West from the Greateat Divide, Washakie, and Sand Wash Basins to the East. The Baxter Shale is extremely eroded forming a deep depression surrounded by sandstone escarpments that are part of the Mesaverde Group. Above the Mesaverde Group escarpments are incised valleys that contain the Lewis Shale, Fox Hills Sandstone, and the Lance Formation. The next unit exposed is the Fort Union Formation deposited in the Paleocene, followed by lower Eocene Wasatch Formation. Most of these are easily eroded marine shale units deposited from Late Cretaceous into the Early Eocene.

=== Sub-basins ===
==== Green River Basin ====
The Green River Basin is the largest sub-basin in the GGRB area at 10,500 square miles. It is defined by multiple outcrops the most prominent being Oyster Ridge, a North to South angled hogback that exposes the Cretaceous Frontier Formation sandstone. The next outcrop is White Mountain containing Mid-Eocene exposure. The North and South margins of the basin are composed of gravels and conglomerates that are Tertiary in age. Eocene deposits dominate the outcrops in the Green River Basin.

==== Great Divide Basin ====
The Great Divide Basin is located in the Northeastern part of the GGRB. Earned its name due to its location right on the Continental Divide. The basin is 3,500 square miles with no significant outcropping. It is made up of low hills, dunes, alkali flats, and arid lakes. It is a desert plains environment separated from the Green River Basin by the Rock Springs Uplift to the West.

==== Washakie Basin ====
The Washakie Basin is a 3,000 square mile, rimmed basin in the South central part of the GGRB just below the Great Divide Basin. The rimmed parts of the basin are about 1,000 ft higher than the basin floor and are capped by the Laney Member of the Green River Formation (Mid-Eocene). Below the Laney Member is the exposure of the Wasatch Formation (Lower Eocene).

==== Sand Wash Basin ====
The Sand Wash is the smallest of the four sub-basins at just 2,000 square miles in size. It is in the Southeastern portion of the GGRB and dips into Northwestern Colorado. There are a few central exposures of Eocene aged rocks that form ridges. The Laney Member of the Green River Formation is exposed along these ridges followed by the Wasatch Formation. Similar to the Washakie Basin just to the North.

== Source rocks, traps, and seals ==
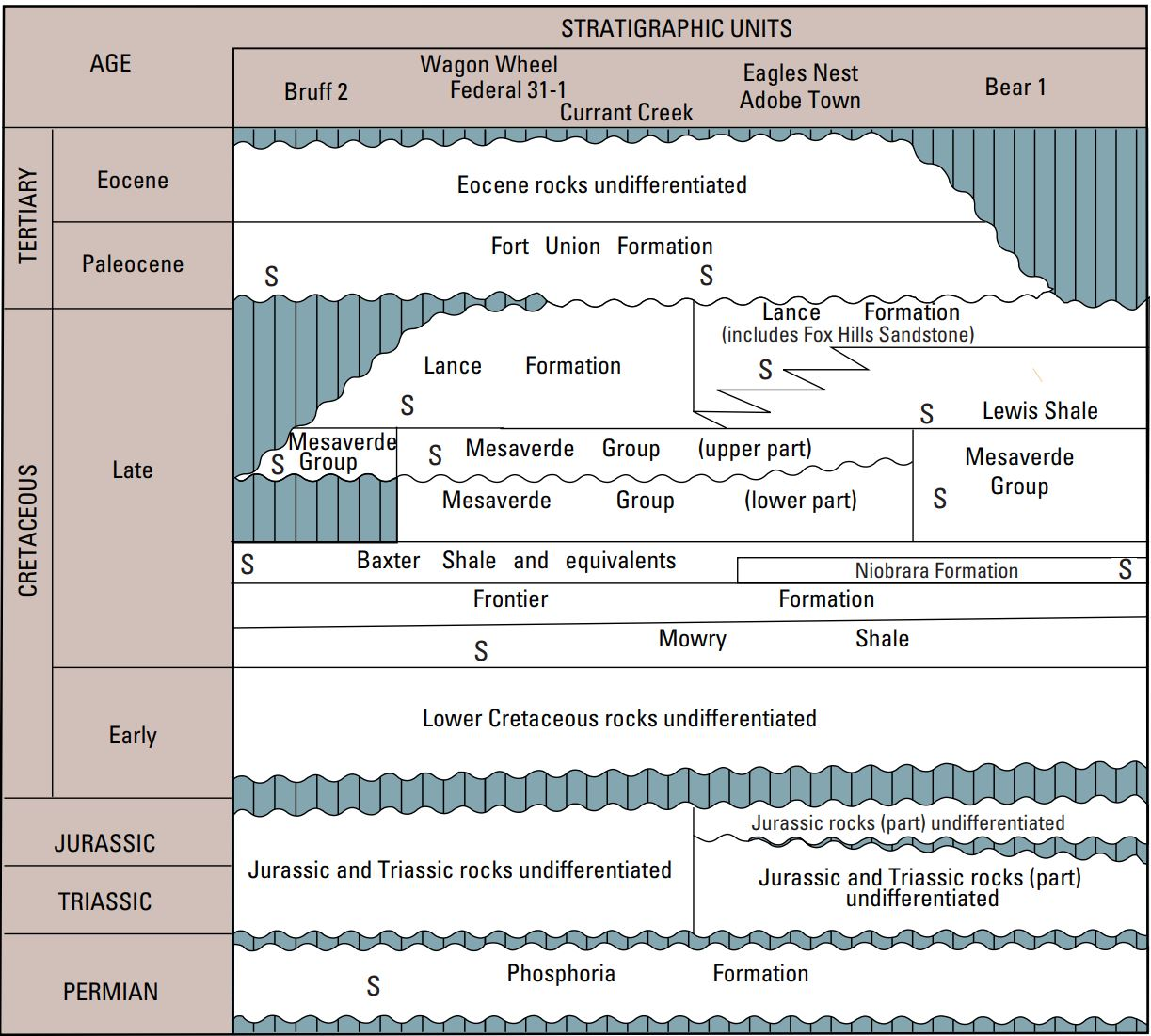
Generalized stratigraphy of the Southwestern Wyoming Province. "S" indicates major source rock.

There are many source rocks in the GGRB, up to 9 viable units, but the most abundant producers of hydrocarbons are the Permian Phosphoria Formation, the Cretaceous Mowry Shale, and the Cretaceous Mesaverde Group. The Cretaceous source rocks are all marine shales that were deposited in a foreland basin created by the Cretaceous seaway. The marine shales experienced subsidence from the erosion of the Sevier Orogeny as well as Progradational accumulation that topped these anoxic marine shales with clastic alluvium. The clastic alluvium units now serve as a great reservoir rock for the marine shales deposited from the Permian into the Cretaceous.

Phosphoria Formation is made up of Permian Shales. It is believed that the organic rich shales are the primary source to much of the oil in the region. It is thought that the oil from these shales have migrated into the Pennsylvanian Tensleep Formation, and Paleozoic reservoirs of Central and Eastern Wyoming. Due to its carbonate and chert rich depositional environment, the oil found in the Phosphoria Formation as a high sulfur content making it Type-IIS kerogen. This is important to note because sulfur rich oils have been known to mature at much lower temperatures than normal. The Tensleep Formation is the most prominent reservoir rock hosting approximately 142 million barrels of oil with about 12 fields producing from this unit. The Phosphoria Formation was sealed by the marine shale units of the Triassic Dinwoody Formation. This shale seal was broken during the Laramide Orogeny leading to the migration of oil into the Tensleep Formation. The oil now is trapped in anticlines formed by the Laramide.

The Mowry Shale is a well-known source rock of Paleozoic reservoirs in Wyoming with the highest total organic content in the area. It is known to source the Dakota Sandstone and Frontier Formation both prolific reservoirs in the Rocky Mountain Region. The Mowry Shale is oil prone for the most part due to the collection of Type-II kerogen at deposition. The Mowry is unique because it is sealed by marine shales and trapped by both anticlines and faults. The Mowry Shales are estimated to hold 6.6 million barrels of oil and about 2 billion cubic feet of gas.

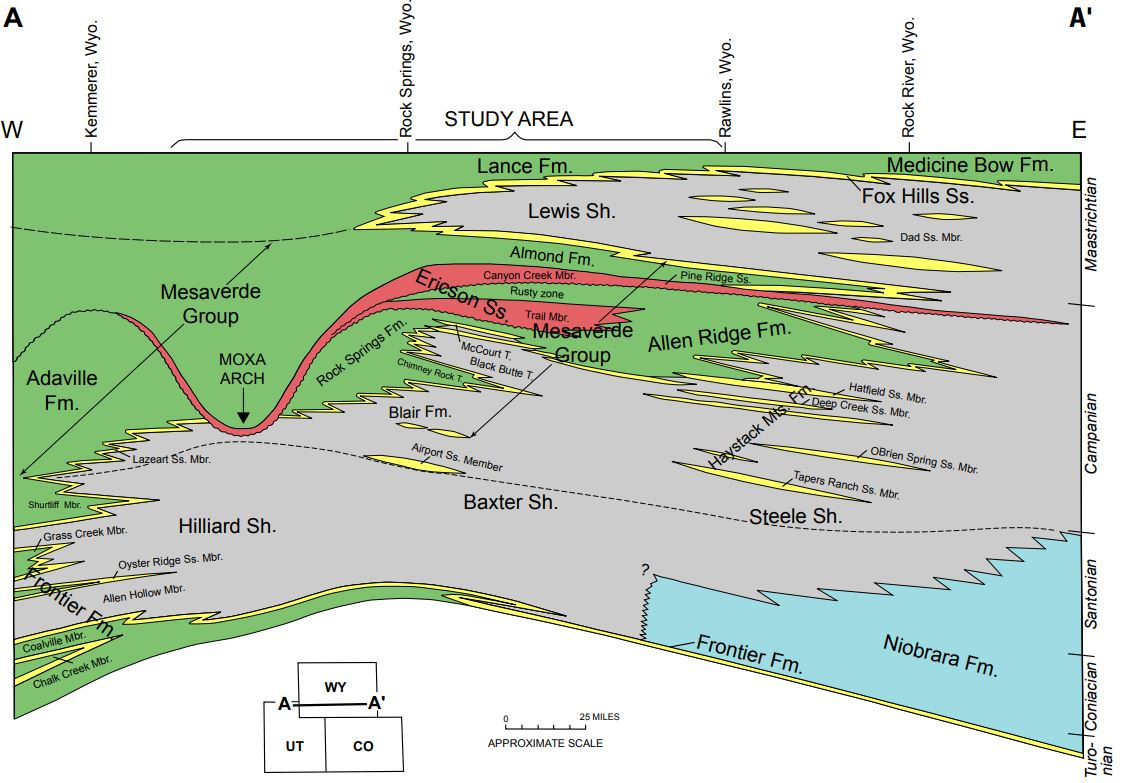
A generalized cross section of the Upper Cretaceous Units shown from west to east along Southwestern Wyoming.

The Cretaceous Mesaverde Group supplies much of the gas to GGRB. The Mesaverde Group was a product of two major transgressions and regressions that lasted approximately 6 million years followed by another sequence that lasted 3 million years. Though much of the Mesaverde units were eroded and this is observed by the unconformity that splits the lower Mesaverde Group from the Upper. The Mesaverde Group is dominated by Type-III Kerogen making it a great source for gas and a decent source for oil. The Mesaverde Group is predominately sealed by marine shales that overlie the group. The Mesaverde Group experiences anticline traps, fault traps, and stratigraphic pinch-out traps in the fields it functions as source rock for throughout the GGRB. The Mesaverde has an estimated production level of 2.3 million barrels of oil, and about 25.83 trillion cubic feet of gas making the Mesaverde Group the ideal source for gas exploration.
