= Aspen Mountain (Wyoming) =

Mountain in the American state of Wyoming

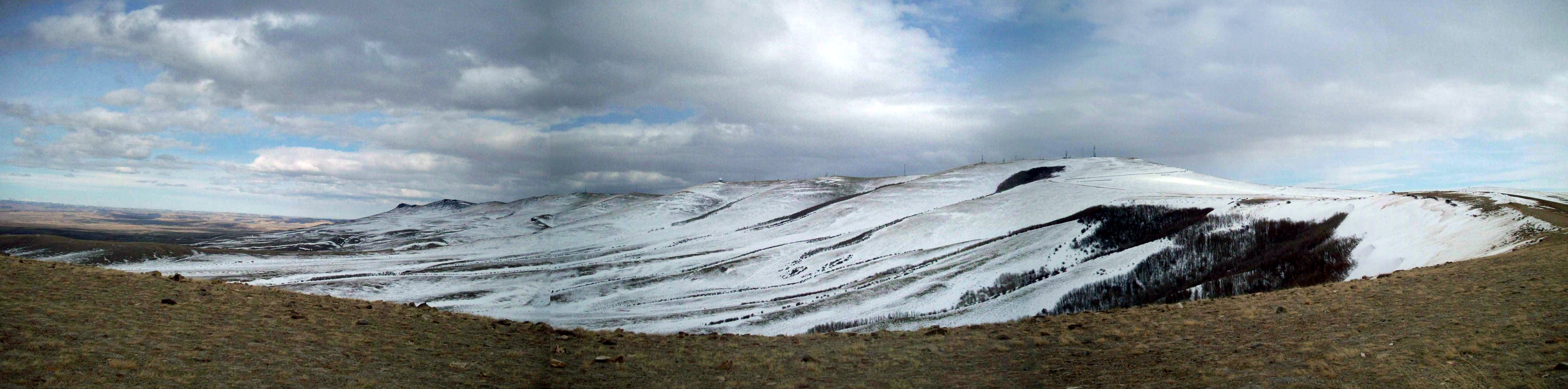
- Aspen Mountain Wyoming, from the north.

Highest point
- Elevation: 8,657 ft (2,639 m)
- Coordinates: 41°26′05.64″N 109°06′59.16″W

Geography
- Location within Wyoming
- Location: Sweetwater County, Wyoming, U.S.

Climbing
- Easiest route: Access Road

Aspen Mountain (also shown on some maps as "Quaking Aspen Mountain") is a long mountain located approximately 12 miles (19 km) south of Rock Springs, Wyoming and 5.5 miles (8.9 km) south of Arrowhead Springs, in Sweetwater County. The mountain gets its name from patches of Quaking Aspen trees located on the north and southern faces of the mountain. Various older topographical maps name the mountain "Quaking Aspen Mountain". Its primary use is for radio communications and it houses towers for various local and state companies.

== Other uses ==
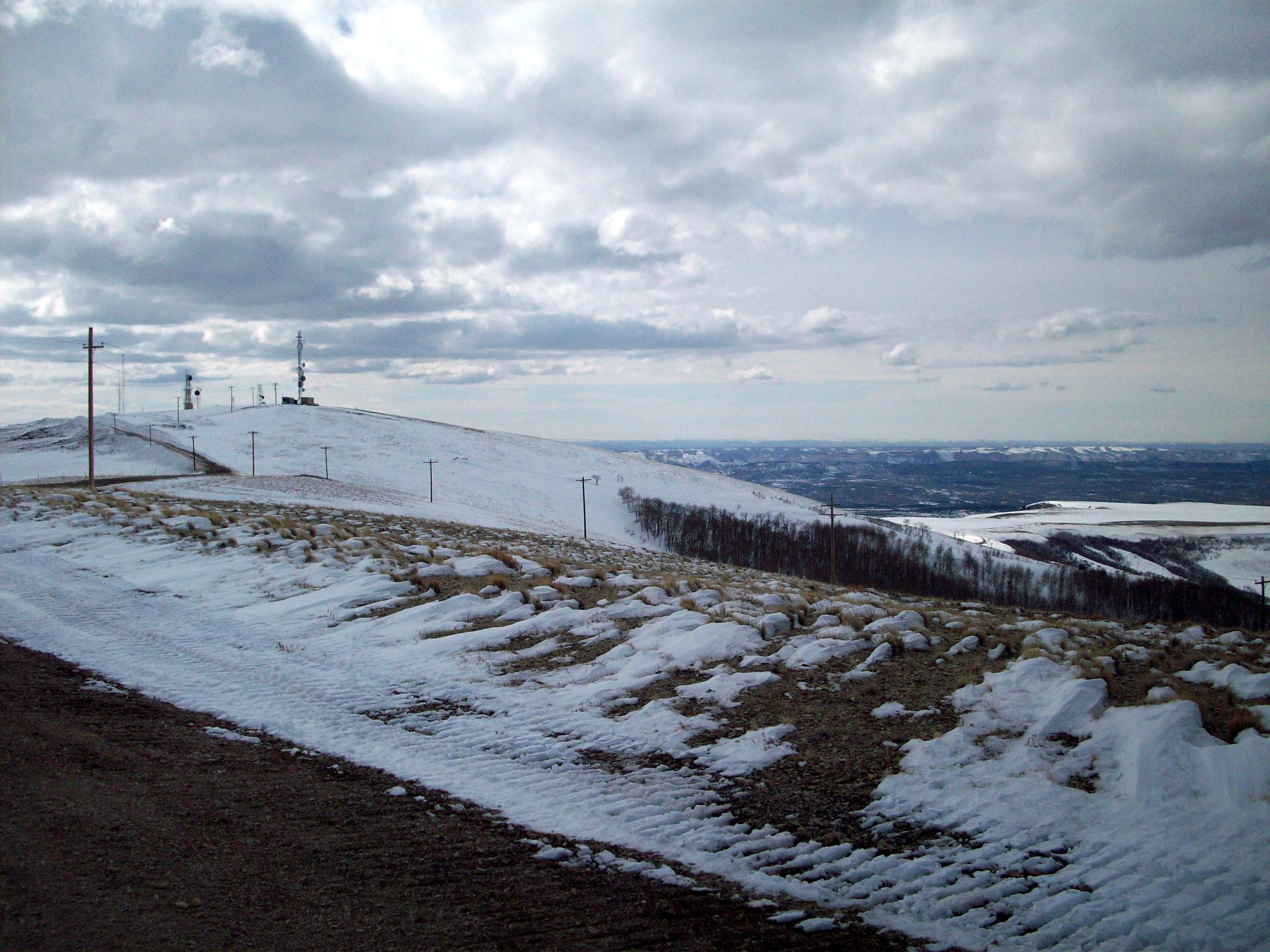
The mountain is named for its patches of Quaking Aspen trees on the north and south face.

Aspen Mountain also houses repeaters used by local highway patrol and local police and fire services for Sweetwater County, which are also present on nearby Wilkins Peak. If the local emergency repeaters on Aspen Mountain fail, they are automatically switched to the Wilkins Peak repeaters, and vice versa. The mountain also houses amateur radio repeaters, and a long range radar station (operated by the FAA) is the mountain's most visible feature.

== Geology ==
Aspen Mountain lies to the north of the Uinta Mountains in the center of the Greater Green River Basin. It is part of the Rock Springs Uplift, and is composed of Miocene deposits. Aspen Mountain contains older Late Cretaceous sections, including the Blair Formation and the Rock Springs Formation, which consist of interbedded sandstone, shale, and seams of coal. A widespread silicified zone characterized by hydrothermal alteration can be found at the summit and nearby ridges. This zone contains significant deposits of alunite and kaolinite, which were first described in detail by J.D. Love in 1962. In 1952, the USGS conducted airborne radioactivity surveys over the Aspen Mountain area to investigate potential uranium and thorium deposits, identifying several anomalies tied to the mountain's unique chemical composition.

== Access ==
Aspen Mountain can be accessed via a number of routes. From Rock Springs, access starts from Blairtown/Flaming Gorge Road, and begins on a road known as Little Bitter Creek Road. Aspen Mountain can also be accessed via county highway 4-27, which begins on Wyoming Highway 430. From the south, the mountain can be accessed via US 191. The roads are usually in good condition year-round, weather permitting. Travel is still possible during the winter months, but a four-wheel drive vehicle is recommended. The road on the mountain itself is known as "Radar Tower Road." Most of the mountain is not off limits, except for various radio towers with fences and the long-range radar station, which features no trespassing signs and a fence around its perimeter. The radar site is also staffed 24 hours a day, 365 days a year, with up to two employees watching the site at a time. In the winter, their only means of travel is often via Snowcats.

== Radio and television stations ==
Aspen Mountain houses telecommunications and surveillance equipment able to provide a large coverage area across Southwestern Wyoming. These transmitters are utilized by federal, state, and commercial entities. The summit's highest point is occupied by a long-range Air Route Surveillance Radar station, identified as site Z-218 (or "Rock Springs"), which is operated by the Federal Aviation Administration to monitor high-altitude air traffic across the region. There is also an amateur radio repeater on the mountain.

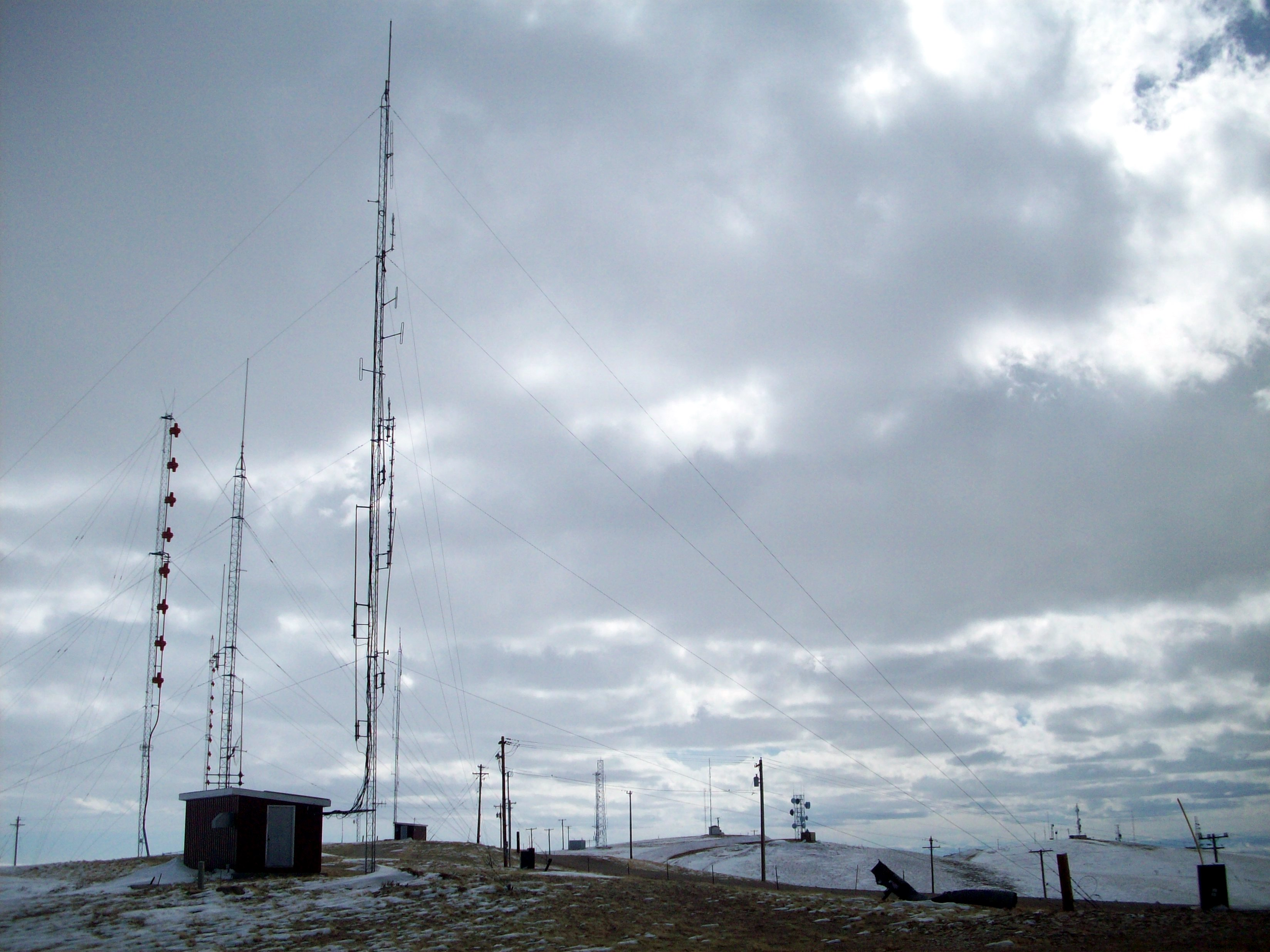
The eastern half of the mountain contains most of the TV and FM transmitters.

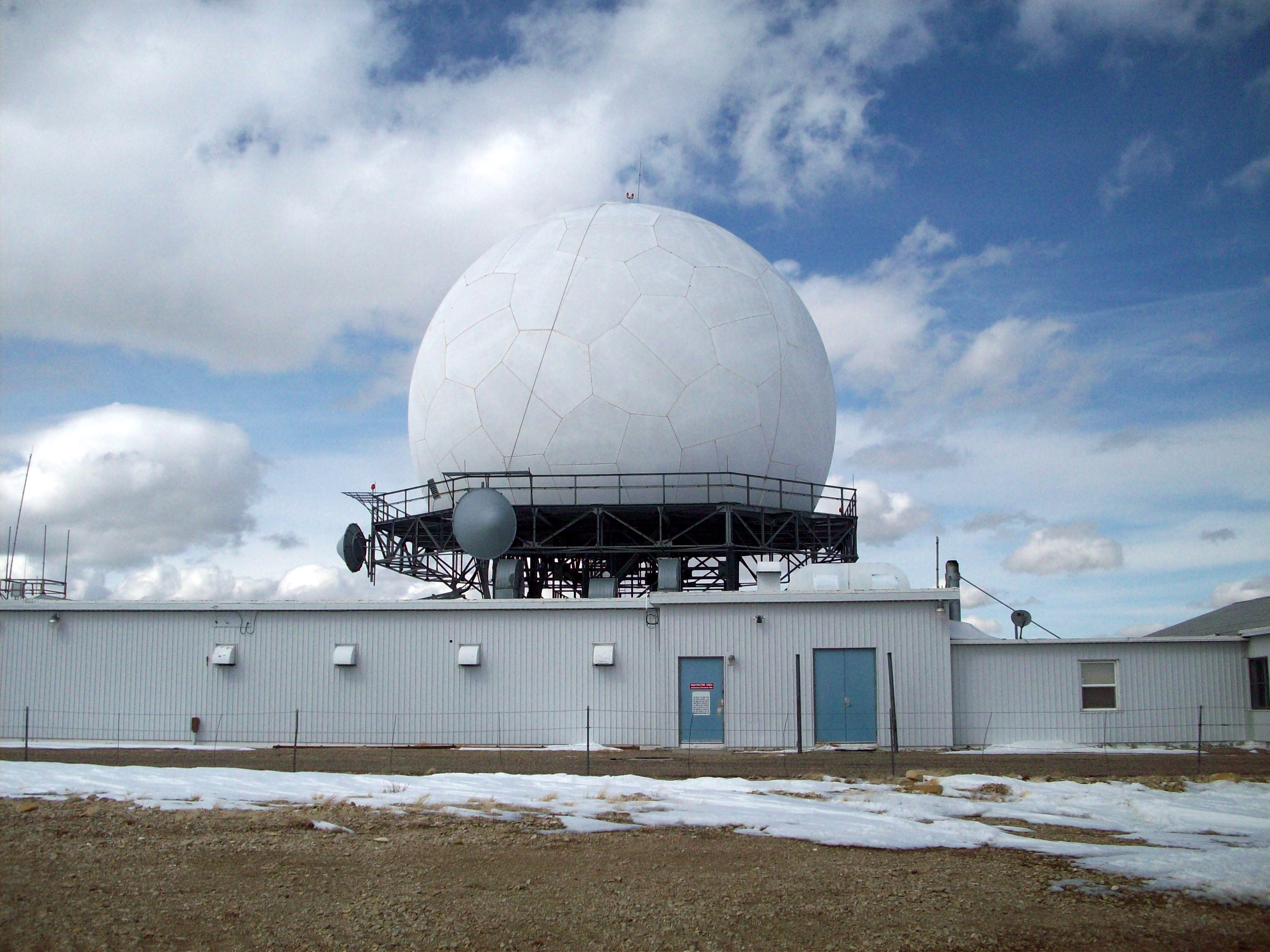
The FAA radar station at the highest point on Aspen Mountain.

- KZUW 88.5 FM - Licensed to Reliance.
- KUWZ 90.5 FM - Licensed to Rock Springs.
- KQSW 96.5 FM - Licensed to Rock Springs.
- KSIT 99.7 FM - Also licensed to Rock Springs (Both FM stations are located on the eastern half of the mountain, near the radar site).
- K278CV 103.5 FM - Licensed to Rock Springs, and retransmitting KRKK 1360 AM.
- KMRZ-FM 106.7 FM - Licensed to Superior, Wyoming, is the only FM station with a tower on the western half of the mountain.
- KGWR Channel 13 -CBS- Rock Springs (Far eastern side of the mountain, second tower from east). It is the only television station broadcasting from the mountain.
- KXI34 162.550 MHz- NOAA Weather Radio - Operated by the Riverton National Weather Service office.

Previously, the mountain was home to a translator for Salt Lake City-based KJZZ-TV, K45IA. That station's license was cancelled in 2018.

== Gallery ==
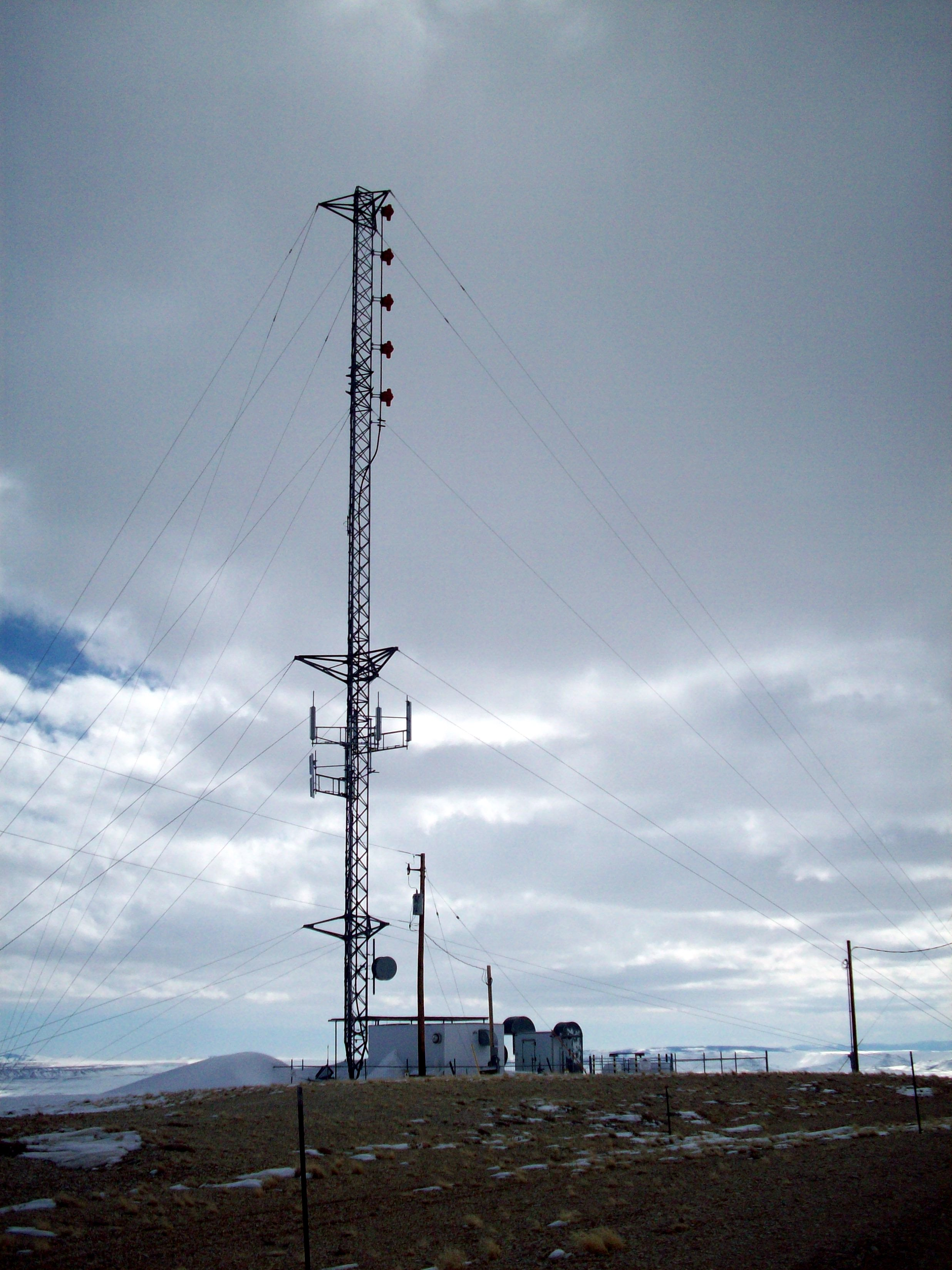
The All-Hazards NOAA weather station KXI34 radio tower is shared with KUWZ.

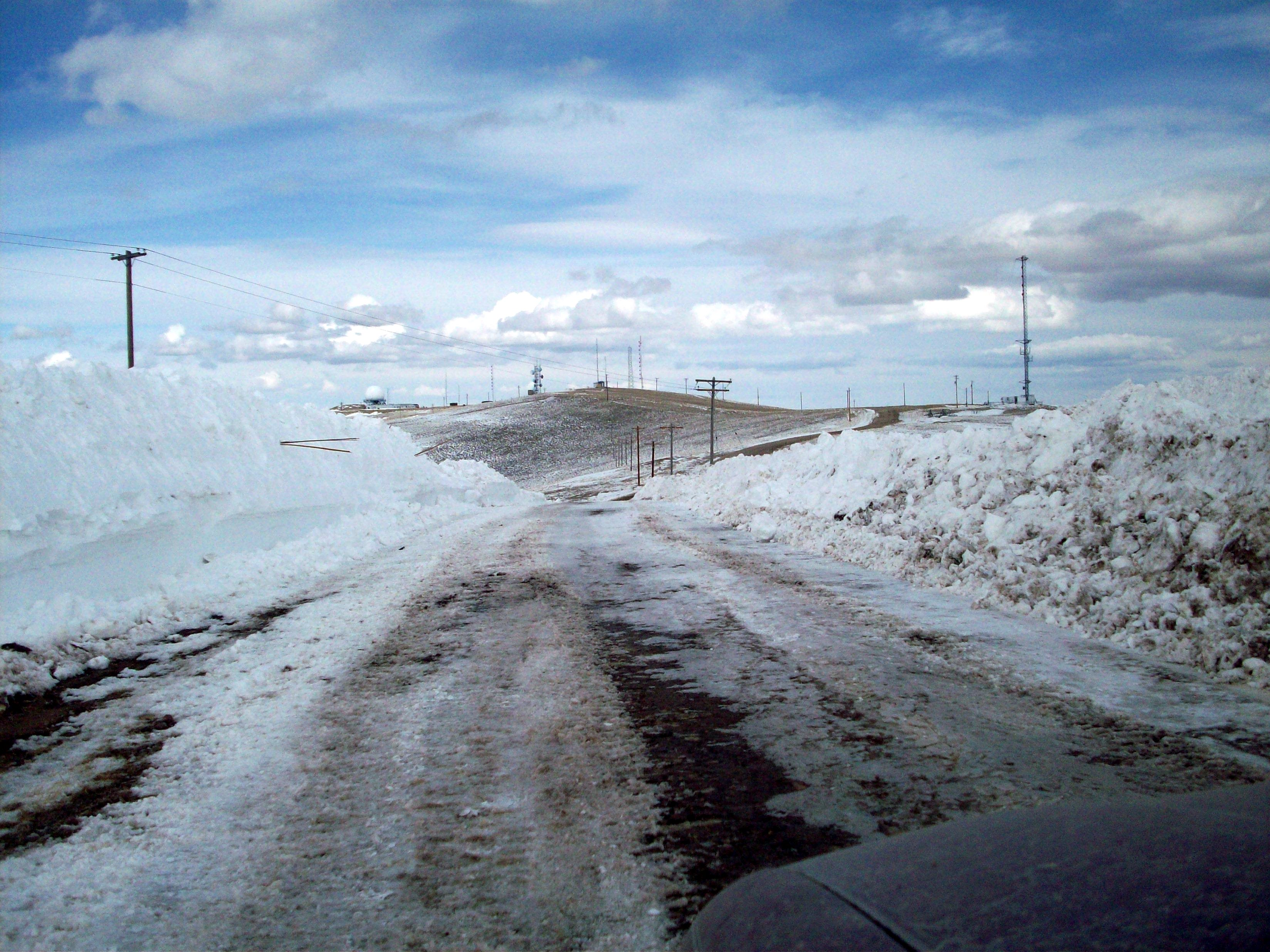
The road in the winter is often impassable without a four wheel drive vehicle.

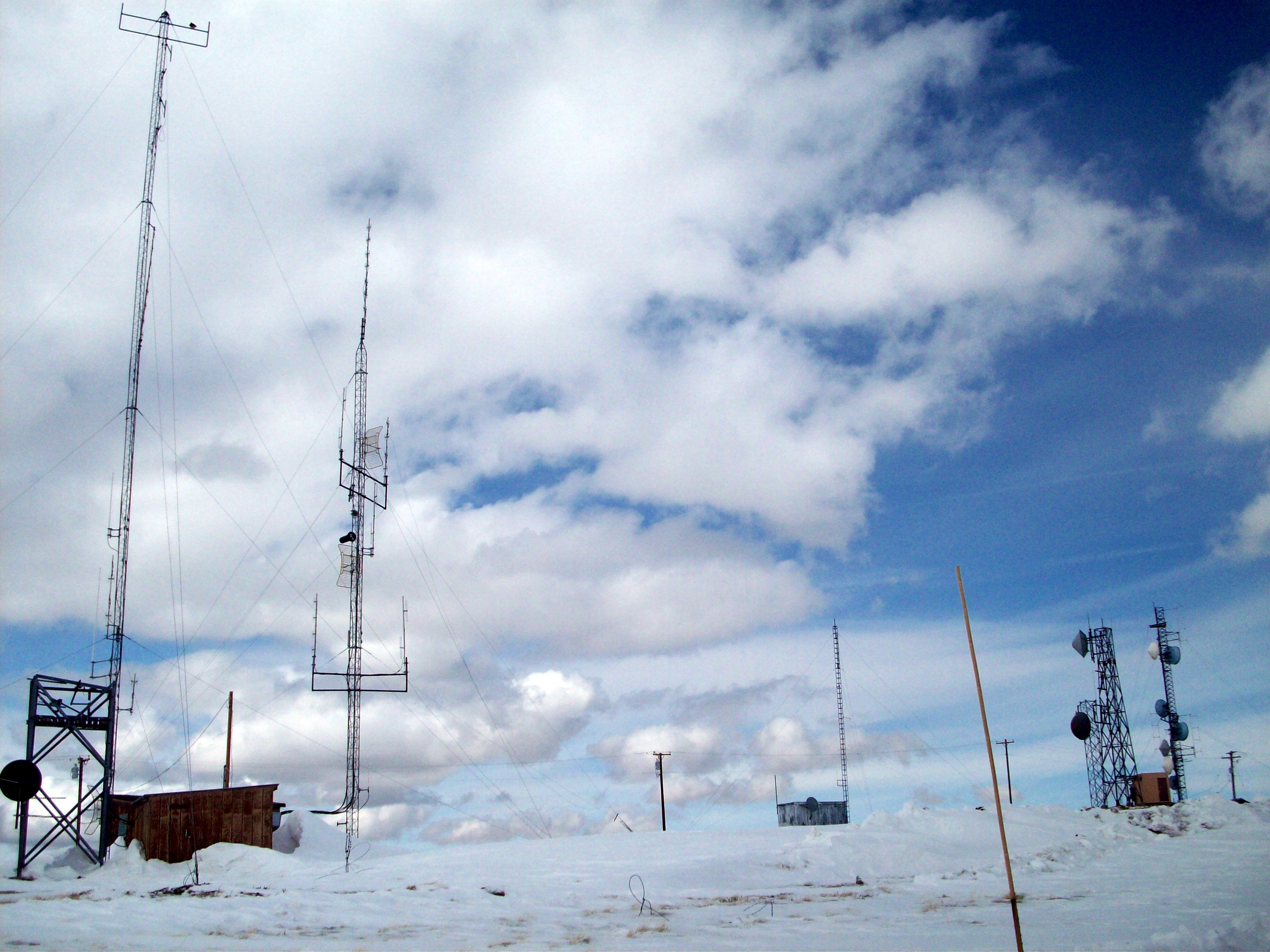
The west central radio towers, mostly used by local and state companies.

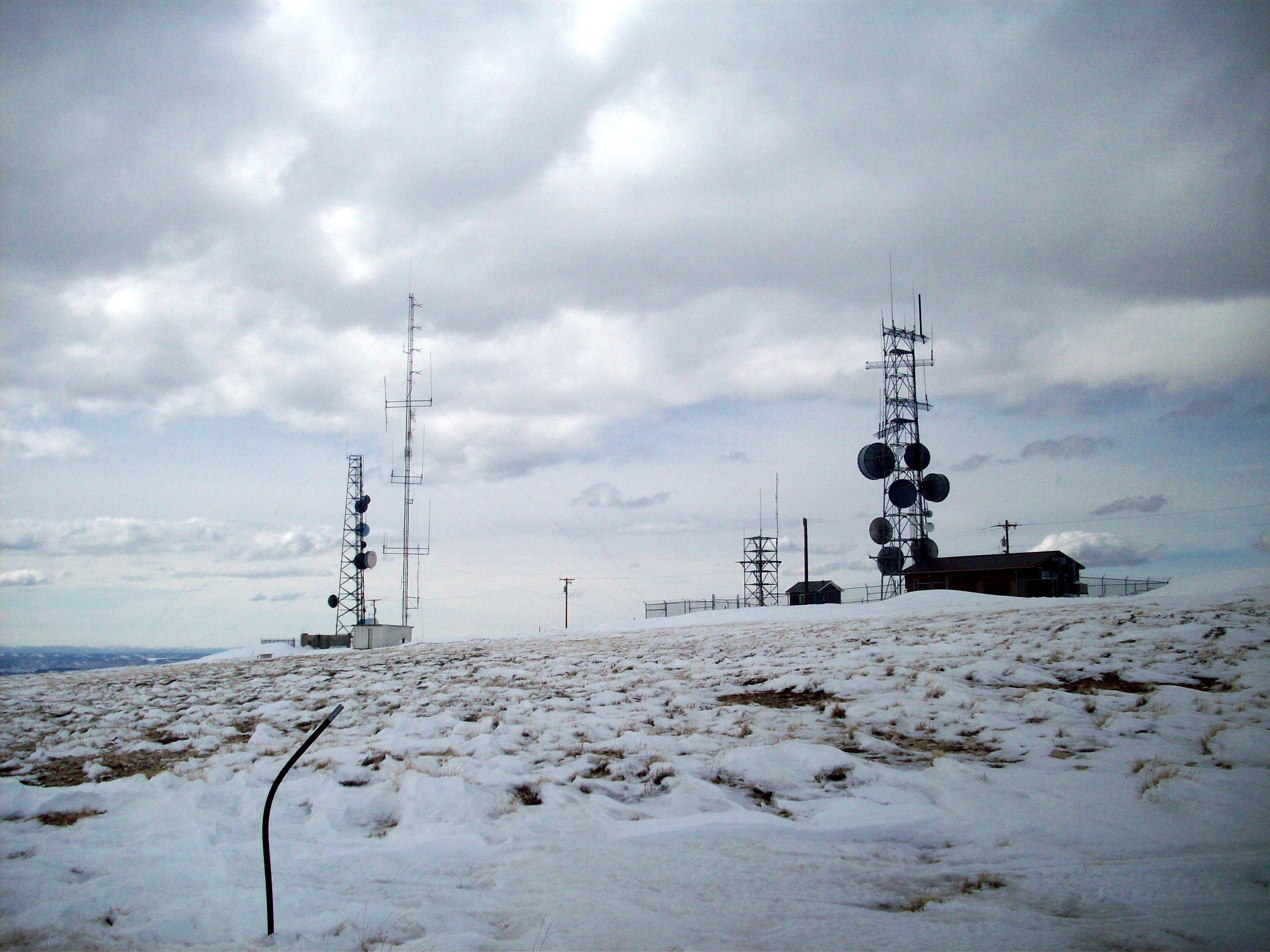
The far western side of the mountain houses radio towers owned by telephone companies such as Qwest.

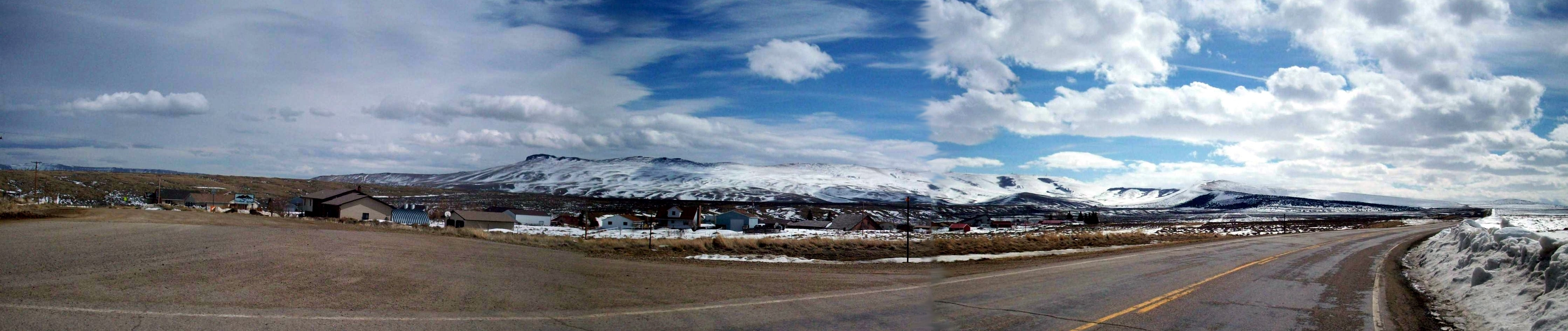
Arrowhead Springs, Wyoming, with Aspen Mountain to the south.
