= Arrowhead Springs, Wyoming =

- Census-designated place
- Location within the state of Wyoming
- Coordinates: 41°30′16″N 109°09′22″W
- Country: United States
- State: Wyoming
- County: Sweetwater

Area
  - Total: 1.2 sq mi (3.1 km^{2})
  - Land: 1.2 sq mi (3.1 km^{2})
  - Water: 0 sq mi (0.0 km^{2})
- Elevation: 6,772 ft (2,064 m)

Population (2010)
  - Total: 63
  - Density: 53/sq mi (20.3/km^{2})
- Time zone: UTC-7 (Mountain (MST))
  - Summer (DST): UTC-6 (MDT)
- Area code: 307
- FIPS code: 56-03652
- GNIS feature ID: 2407765

Arrowhead Springs is a census-designated place (CDP) in Sweetwater County, Wyoming, United States. The population was 63 at the 2010 census.

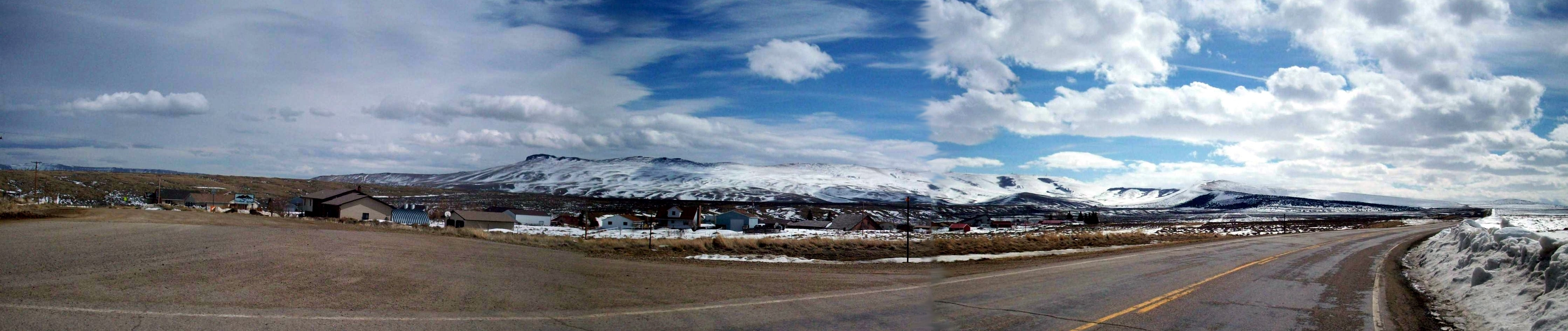
Arrowhead Springs, with Aspen Mountain to the south.

== Geography ==
According to the United States Census Bureau, the CDP has a total area of 1.2 square miles (3.1 km^{2}), all land.

== Demographics ==
As of the census of 2010, there were 63 people, 22 households, and 16 families residing in the CDP. The population density was 56.0 people per square mile (21.7/km^{2}). There were 23 housing units at an average density of 17.3/sq mi (6.7/km^{2}). The racial makeup of the CDP was 100% White.

There were 22 households, out of which 18.2% had children under the age of 18 living with them, 72.7% were married couples living together, and 27.3% were non-families. 18.2% of all households were made up of individuals, and none had someone living alone who was 65 years of age or older. The average household size was 2.86 and the average family size was 3.38.

In the CDP, the population was spread out, with 22.2% under the age of 18, 2.9% from 18 to 24, 20.7% from 25 to 44, 41.2% from 45 to 64, and 7.9% who were 65 years of age or older. The median age was 44.8 years. Males comprised 50.8% and females 49.2% of the population.

The median income for a household in the CDP was $81,467, and the median income for a family was $83,654. Males had a median income of $68,750 versus $46,250 for females. The per capita income for the CDP was $28,972. None of the population or the families were below the poverty line.

== Education ==
Public education in the community of Arrowhead Springs is provided by Sweetwater County School District #1.
