= KSIT =

- Rock Springs, Wyoming; United States
- Broadcast area: Rock Springs, Wyoming
- Frequency: 99.7 MHz
- Branding: 99.7 Jack FM

Programming
- Format: Adult hits
- Affiliations: Jack FM network

Ownership
- Owner: Big Thicket Broadcasting Company of Wyoming, Inc.
- Sister stations: KRKK, KQSW, and KMRZ-FM

History
- First air date: 1978; 48 years ago
- Former call signs: KMKX (1997–1999)
- Former frequencies: 104.5 MHz (1978–2005)

Technical information
- Licensing authority: FCC
- Facility ID: 63966
- Class: C
- ERP: 100,000 watts
- HAAT: 493.4 meters (1,619 ft)
- Transmitter coordinates: 41°25′59.9″N 109°7′03.4″W

Links
- Public license information: Public file; LMS
- Webcast: Listen Live
- Website: 99ksit.com

KSIT (99.7 FM) is an American radio station licensed to serve the community of Rock Springs, Wyoming. KSIT's sister stations are KQSW 96.5, KRKK AM 1360, and KMRZ-FM.

== History ==
KSIT signed on as the only classic rock station in Sweetwater County in 1978 at 104.5 FM. KSIT is also an affiliate of The Rockin' America Top 30 Countdown with Scott Shannon throughout the 1980s. The studios were located on Sunset Drive. In 1997, the station changed call letters to KMKX, playing a mix of formats from country to rock. It was owned by Sunset Broadcasting. The station returned to classic rock and the KSIT call letters in 1999. Prior to 1999, the station's competition included now sister KQSW and KRKK. Big Thicket Broadcasting acquired KSIT shortly after. The station was mentioned in a book about Southwestern American Literature. The author describes listening to the station on the way to Steamboat Springs, Colorado.

== Frequency change ==
A recording of KSIT 104.5 Rock Springs Wyoming from some time between 1999 and 2005.

In 2005, KSIT moved its frequency from 104.5 to 99.7 MHz to clear the path for the Utah radio station KYLZ to move to 104.7 MHz and change its city of license to Lyman, Wyoming. The frequency change was funded by the owners of KYLZ. 3 Point Media, the owners of KYLZ sought bankruptcy protection in July 2007, prior to the new KYLZ facilities being licensed for operation.

== Format change to Jack FM ==
On May 31, 2016 KSIT changed their format from classic rock (as "Rock 99.7") to adult hits, branded as "99.7 Jack FM".

== Signal ==
KSIT covers almost all of Sweetwater County and also has fringe coverage in parts of northern Utah, northern Colorado and southeastern Idaho. The station's broadcast tower is located on top of Aspen Mountain, south of Rock Springs. KSIT's tower is 8,648 feet (2,636 m) above sea level on top of Aspen Mountain. The studios are located north of Rock Springs on Yellowstone road, shared with its sister stations.
