= KRKK =

- Rock Springs, Wyoming; United States
- Broadcast area: Southwestern Wyoming
- Frequency: 1360 kHz
- Branding: 1360 KRKK

Programming
- Format: Oldies

Ownership
- Owner: Big Thicket Broadcasting Company of Wyoming, Inc.
- Sister stations: KMRZ-FM, KQSW, KSIT

History
- First air date: 1938; 88 years ago
- Former call signs: KVRS (1938–1974)
- Former frequencies: 1400 kHz (1942–1974)

Technical information
- Licensing authority: FCC
- Facility ID: 5301
- Class: B
- Power: 5,000 watts (day); 1,000 watts (night)
- Transmitter coordinates: 41°37′12″N 109°14′20″W
- Translator: 103.5 K278CV (Rock Springs)

Links
- Public license information: Public file; LMS
- Webcast: Listen live
- Website: 1360krkk.com

KRKK is a commercial AM radio station broadcasting from Rock Springs, Wyoming on 1360 kHz. KRKK broadcasts from two towers near its studios on Yellowstone Road in Rock Springs, Wyoming and is owned by Big Thicket Broadcasting Company of Wyoming. The current programming format is oldies under the branding Unforgettable Memories.

== History ==
The station's history dates back to 1938, when it was originally licensed under the call sign KVRS. It began broadcasting in 1942, operating at that time on 1400 kHz. In its early years of operation, it served as a local affiliate for the Mutual Broadcasting System (MBS). The transition to its current identity occurred on September 1, 1974, when the station changed its call letters to KRKK and moved to its present frequency of 1360 kHz. In the late 1970s, it was known for its robust local news coverage, which provided intense public scrutiny of local officials during a period of rapid economic growth in the region.

During its beginnings, the station carried top 40 programming, but switched to oldies some time in the 1980s. The station aired an oldies format from Cumulus Media.

In May 2009 and the station became a conservative talk station. On December 14, 2014, the station changed formats to ESPN Radio, becoming 1360 ESPN.

After three years of sports talk, the station returned to an oldies format, rebranding as Unforgettable Memories.

== Signal ==
At 5,000 watts during the day, KRKK drops to 1,000 watts at night with a directional signal to protect other stations on 1360 kHz. KRKK utilizes a two-tower directional antenna array to broadcast its signal. These towers are located at 2717 Yellowstone Road in Rock Springs. KRKK has three sister stations KSIT 99.7, KQSW 96.5 and KMRZ-FM 106.7 FM. Monitoring reports from the National Radio Club in 2023 and 2025 show that the station is often heard with a "fairly strong signal" in various parts of California. KRKK has sometimes been reported as far away as New Zealand.

In 2018, the station added a translator on 103.5 FM. The translator was broadcasting from Aspen Mountain.
