= KQSW =

- Rock Springs, Wyoming; United States
- Frequency: 96.5 MHz
- Branding: 96.5 FM Hot Country

Programming
- Format: Country music
- Affiliations: Cumulus Media

Ownership
- Owner: Big Thicket Broadcasting Company of Wyoming, Inc.
- Sister stations: KSIT, KRKK, KMRZ-FM

History
- First air date: 1977

Technical information
- Licensing authority: FCC
- Facility ID: 5300
- Class: C
- ERP: 100,000 watts
- HAAT: 494 meters (1,621 ft)

Links
- Public license information: Public file; LMS
- Webcast: Listen live
- Website: https://96kqsw.com/

KQSW (96.5 FM) is a country music formatted radio station broadcasting from Rock Springs, Wyoming, United States, serving southwestern Wyoming. The station is owned by Big Thicket Broadcasting of Wyoming, who identifies themselves as WyoRadio, which includes local sister stations KSIT, KMRZ-FM, and KRKK.

== History ==
The station signed on the air in 1977. Its first owner was Media West. The station was relaunched in 1984 by Lifestyles, Inc., a company owned by Dennis Hill and John Walsh. In March 1989, Lifestyles, Inc. reached an agreement to sell KQSW to Poster Communications, Inc. for $721,600.

The station has been owned and operated by Big Thicket Broadcasting Company of Wyoming since 1999. Big Thicket consolidated KQSW's operations with sister stations KRKK and KSIT at a central facility on Yellowstone Road in Rock Springs. In the late 1990s, the station shifted its primary branding to "Q-96" and adopted a country music format.

== Signal ==
Like its sister FM station KSIT, KQSW broadcasts from a tower on Aspen Mountain located south of Rock Springs. Although sister stations KQSW and KMRZ-FM are also on Aspen Mountain, the three stations use separate towers. KQSW can be heard throughout Sweetwater County, and in parts of northern Utah. KQSW's tower is 8,647 feet (2,636 m) above sea level atop Aspen Mountain.
