= KMRZ-FM =

- Superior, Wyoming; United States
- Broadcast area: Rock Springs–Green River
- Frequency: 106.7 MHz
- Branding: Z106

Programming
- Format: Adult contemporary
- Affiliations: Westwood One

Ownership
- Owner: Big Thicket Broadcasting Company of Wyoming, Inc.
- Sister stations: KRKK, KQSW, KSIT

History
- First air date: July 2008; 17 years ago
- Former call signs: KKWY (2008)

Technical information
- Licensing authority: FCC
- Facility ID: 164153
- Class: C1
- ERP: 7,000 watts
- HAAT: 482 meters (1,581 ft)
- Transmitter coordinates: 41°25′28″N 109°7′54″W

Links
- Public license information: Public file; LMS
- Webcast: Listen live
- Website: KMRZ-FM website

KMRZ-FM (106.7 FM) is a radio station licensed to Superior, Wyoming. Carrying an adult contemporary format, the station serves the Rock Springs area. The station is owned by Big Thicket Broadcasting Company of Wyoming. Along with other stations in the area, the broadcast tower for KMRZ is located on Aspen Mountain.

== History ==
Though its license was granted on May 14, 2008, the station signed on in July 2008 as KKWY. In August 2008, while off air, the station changed calls to KMRZ. The station started airing a Spanish contemporary format, before flipping to contemporary hits. The call letters KMRZ were previously used for a station in Cheyenne, Wyoming, known now as KGAB. The KKWY calls appeared on KFBU, also in Cheyenne.

On July 3, 2023, the station flipped from a top 40 format to an adult contemporary format with the branding Z106.
