= Mowry Shale =

Geologic formation in Wyoming, USA

- Stratigraphic range: Albian
- Characteristic white or silvery colored Mowry Shale below the Mancos Shale, west of Dinosaur National Monument.
- Type: Geological formation

Location
- Region: Johnson County, Wyoming

Type section
- Named by: N. H. Darton in 1904

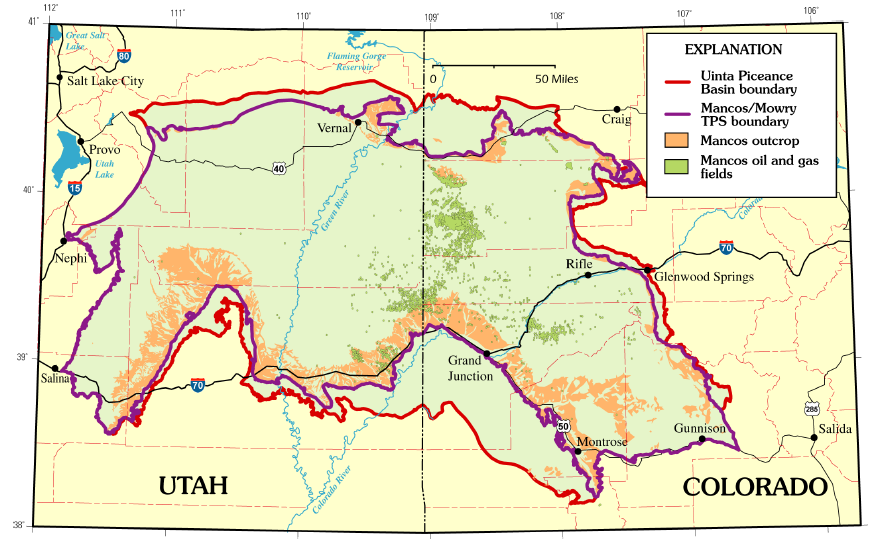
Mancos Shale and Mowry shale oil and gas fields within the Uinta Basin and Piceance Basin

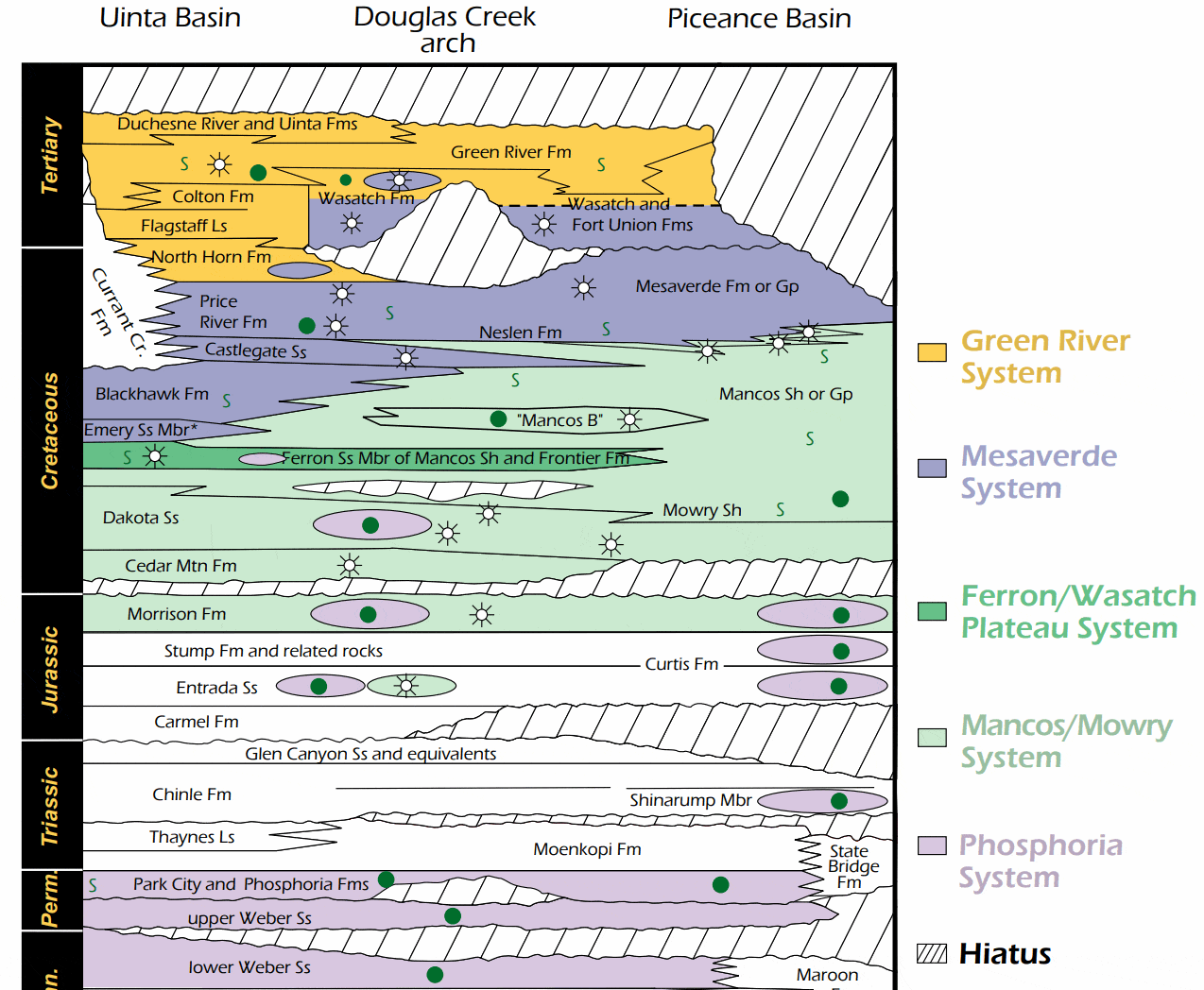
Stratigraphic column showing the relationship of the Mancos and Mowry shales

The Mowry Shale is an Early Cretaceous geologic formation. The formation was named for Mowrie Creek, northwest of Buffalo in Johnson County, Wyoming.

== Description ==
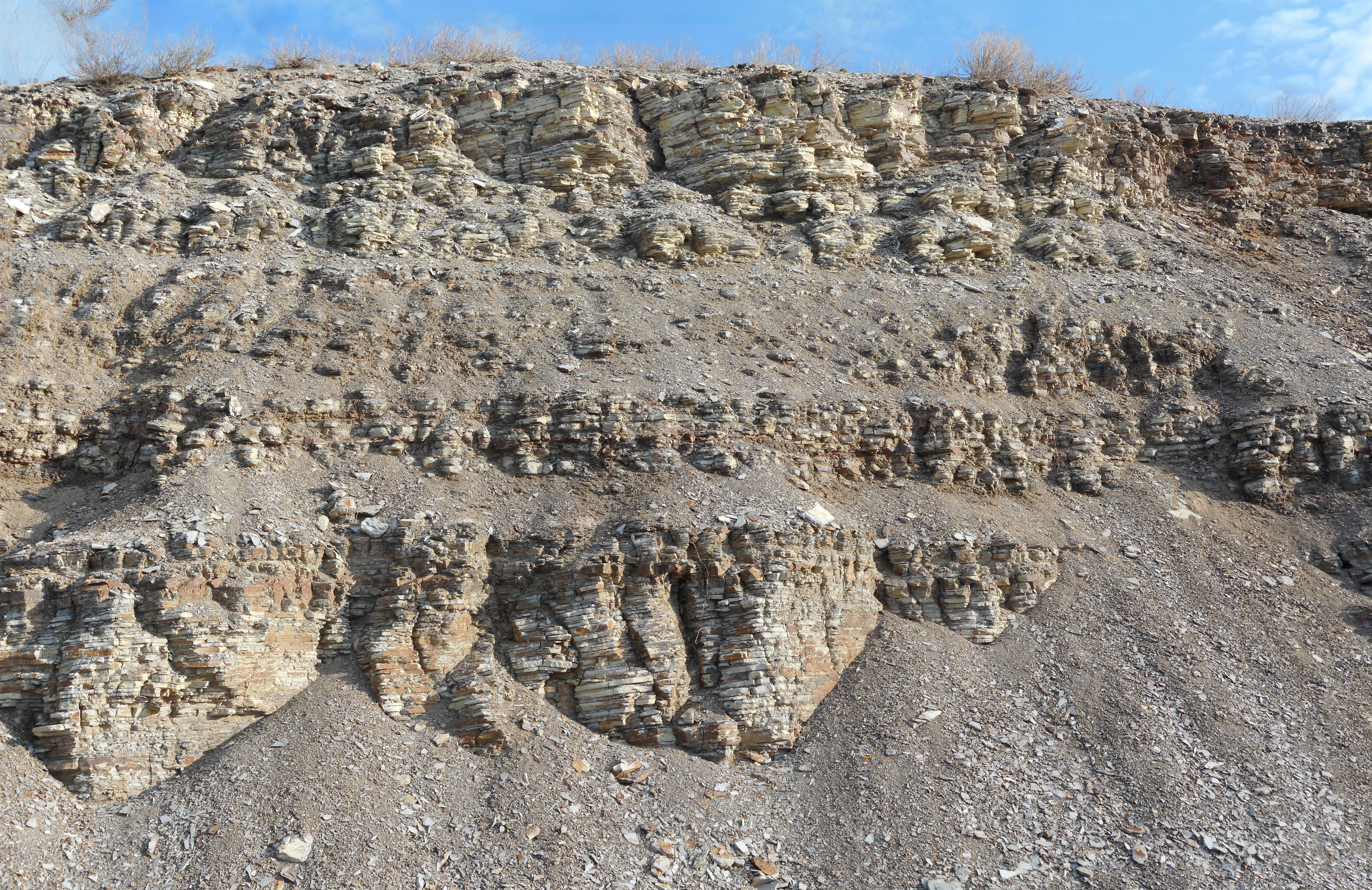
Mowry Shale exposed in a road cut, Uintah Basin, Utah.

The Mowry Shale or Fish-scale Beds because of the abundance of fish scales, is a dark-gray, siliceous shale that weathers silver gray; it is 10-70 m thick. 40Ar/39Ar of sanidine from a bentonite yielded an age of 97.17 +/-0.69 Ma, thus is Cenomanian in age. Fossils indicate the Mowry was deposited during the early stages of the Western Interior Seaway.

== Age ==
In so much as the Mowry was observed to lie above formations that were originally thought to be associated with the difficult to date upper Dakota units, especially Newcastle Sandstone, the Mowry was previously thought to be of Cenomanian age. However, recent studies, particularly of fossil pollens and spores, have dated the Mowry to the late-Albian. In many locations, the Mowry is bounded above by the Clay Spur bentonite, which is assigned the radiometric date of 97 million years, the upper Mowry may extend into the earliest Cenomanian.

== Paleontology ==
Invertebrate fossils known include the ammonites Metengonoceras aspenanum, Metengonoceras teigenense, Neogastroplites americanus, and Neogastroplites muelleri.

Isolated, lenticular accumulations of fish bones, scales, teeth and coprolites are thought to represent storm lag deposits formed by winnowing of the seafloor and concentration of the bones in bottom scours. The following fish species have been identified from the Mowry: an unnamed caturid, an unnamed ichthyodectid, Clupavus sp., Enchodus sp., Apateodus sp., an unnamed alepisaurid, and Xenyllion zonensis. Xenyllion is the oldest acanthomorph (spiny-rayed) teleost in North America.

Dinosaur remains diagnostic to the genus have been recovered from the formation.

== Distribution ==
The Mowry outcrops or occurs at depth in parts of Colorado, Montana, North Dakota, South Dakota, Utah and Wyoming. It occurs within the following geologic regions:

- Bighorn Basin
- Central Montana Uplift
- Chadron Arch
- Denver Basin
- Green River Basin
- Montana Fold Belt
- North Park Basin
- Powder River Basin
- Sweetgrass Arch
- Uinta Uplift
- Williston Basin
- Wind River Basin
- Yellowstone Province

== See also ==
- List of dinosaur-bearing rock formations
  - List of stratigraphic units with few dinosaur genera
