= Wyomingite =

Type of volcanic rock

Wyomingite is a type of volcanic rock. Specifically, it is a diopside-leucite phlogopite lamproite. It is a potassium enriched, alkaline, basic, phonolite first found in the Leucite Hills of Sweetwater County, Wyoming. Wyomingites are between foidite and tephri-phonolite in composition (in the QAPF classification) and contain leucite (20-25%), augite, phlogopite, apatite, calcite, magnetite and small amounts of olivine (but the latter may be absent). Silica (SiO_{2}) content is between 48.9% and 51.7%. Common groundmass includes potassium-richterite. Wyomingite has also been found at two locations in Australia: West Kimberley, and near Ballina, New South Wales.

Wyomingite plots in the phonolite field in the TAS classification.

== See also ==
- Nephrite – Variety of jade – the state gemstone of Wyoming
