= Rock Springs Uplift =

Coordinates: 41°35′44″N 109°04′00″W

The Rock Springs Uplift is an area of uplifted Cretaceous to Eocene rocks in Wyoming surrounded and once covered by sediments of the Green River Formation which were deposited in the Eocene Lake Gosiute. The Rock Springs Uplift formed in the Late Cretaceous through the Eocene and is related to the Laramide orogeny. The structure is a north–south trending anticline with a surface expression of approximately 56 miles (90 km) by 28 mi (45 km). The community of Rock Springs is located on the western margin of the uplift.

A recently discovered lithium deposit is estimated at 228,000 tons. Additional deposits in the same formation were extrapolated to be as much as 18 million tons.

== Features ==
- White Mountain
- Aspen Mountain
- Wilkins Peak
