= Timeline of Wyoming history =

Coordinates: 42.9957°N 107.5512°W

This timeline is a chronology of significant events in the history of the U.S. State of Wyoming and the historical area now occupied by the state.

2000s 1900s 1800s Statehood Territory 1700s 1600s 1500s Before 1492

== 2020s ==
Year	Date	Event
2022	November 8	In the 2022 General Election, Wyoming voters elect Harriet Hageman as U.S. Representative and re-elect Mark Gordon as Governor. Republicans retain control of the Wyoming Legislature.
2021	September 2	Wyoming U.S. Representative Liz Cheney is named Vice Chair of the United States House Select Committee on the January 6 Attack.
2021	May 12	Wyoming U.S. Representative Liz Cheney is removed as Chair of the House Republican Conference.
2021	January 13	Wyoming U.S. Representative Liz Cheney votes to impeach President Donald Trump.
2020	November 3	In the 2020 General Election, Wyoming voters elect three U.S. Presidential Electors for President Donald Trump, elect Cynthia Lummis as the junior U.S. Senator, and re-elect Liz Cheney as U.S. Representative. Republicans retain control of the Wyoming Legislature.
2020	September 17	The Mullen Fire ignites 7 miles (11 km) west of Centennial. As many as 1,254 firefighters battle the wildfire as it spreads through Carbon County, Albany County, and Jackson County, Colorado, and consumes 176,878 acres (716 km^{2}) of forest.
2020	April 1	The 2020 United States census enumerates the population of the State of Wyoming, later determined to be 576,851, a 2.35% increase since the 2010 United States census. Wyoming remains the least populous of the 50 United States.

== 2010s ==
Year	Date	Event
2019	January 7	Mark Gordon takes office as the thirty-third Governor of State of Wyoming.
2019	January 3	Liz Cheney takes office as the Wyoming U.S. Representative and is named Chair of the House Republican Conference.
2017	August 21	The solar eclipse of August 21, 2017 sweeps across Wyoming. Huge crowds gather in Casper and Glendo to witness the total solar eclipse.
2011	January 3	Matt Mead takes office as the thirty-second Governor of State of Wyoming.
2010	April 1	The 2010 United States census enumerates the population of the State of Wyoming, later determined to be 563,626, an increase of 14.1% since the 2000 United States census. Wyoming remains the least populous of the 50 U.S. states.

== 2000s ==
Year	Date	Event
2007	January 3	John Barrasso takes office as the junior Wyoming U.S. Senator.
2003	January 6	Dave Freudenthal takes office as the thirty-first Governor of State of Wyoming.
2001	January 20	Dick Cheney takes office as the forty-sixth Vice President of the United States.
2000	April 1	The 2000 United States census enumerates the population of the State of Wyoming, later determined to be 493,782, an increase of 8.9% since the 1990 United States census. Wyoming remains the least populous of the 50 U.S. states.

== 1990s ==
Year	Date	Event
1997	January 3	Mike Enzi takes office as the junior Wyoming U.S. Senator.
1995	January 2	Jim Geringer takes office as the thirtieth Governor of State of Wyoming.
1992	August 3	U.S. President George H. W. Bush signs into law an amendment to the National Trails System Act to designate the California National Historic Trail and Pony Express National Historic Trail as components of the National Trails System.
1990	April 1	The 1990 United States census enumerates the population of the State of Wyoming, later determined to be 453,588, a decrease of -3.4% since the 1980 United States census. As its population decreases, Wyoming becomes the least populous of the 50 U.S. states.

== 1980s ==
Year	Date	Event
1989	March 22	U.S. President George H. W. Bush appoints Dick Cheney the seventeenth United States Secretary of Defense.
1988	November 8	The Town of Alpine is incorporated.
1988	June 14	The first of over 200 wildfires begin burning in Yellowstone National Park and adjacent national forests. More than 9,000 firefighters battle the wildfires as they consume 793,880 acres (3,213 km^{2}) of forest.
1987	January 5	Mike Sullivan takes office as the twenty-ninth Governor of State of Wyoming.
1984	November 27	The Town of Wright is incorporated.
1984	March 8	The Town of Rolling Hills is incorporated.
1982	November 8	The Town of Bar Nunn is incorporated.
1980	April 1	The 1980 United States census enumerates the population of the State of Wyoming, later determined to be 469,557, an increase of 41.3% since the 1970 United States census. Wyoming remains the 49th most populous of the 50 U.S. states.

== 1970s ==
Year	Date	Event
1979	December 18	The Town of Hanna annexes the adjacent Town of Elmo.
1979	July 16	An F3 tornado makes landfall in Cheyenne, killing 1 and injuring 40. It remains the most destructive tornado in the state's history.
1978	November 10	U.S. President Jimmy Carter signs the National Parks and Recreation Act of 1978 authorizing the Continental Divide National Scenic Trail, the Mormon Pioneer National Historic Trail, and the Oregon National Historic Trail.
1978	October 9	The United Nations Educational, Scientific and Cultural Organization (UNESCO) designates Yellowstone National Park as one of the first 12 World Heritage Sites.
1977	September	The City of Cody transfers Shoshone Cavern to the Bureau of Land Management.
1976	July 4	The State of Wyoming celebrates the Bicentennial of the United States of America.
1975	January 6	Edgar J. Herschler takes office as the twenty-eighth Governor of State of Wyoming.
1973	April 26	The Town of Midwest is incorporated.
1973	February 13	The Town of La Barge is incorporated.
1972	October 23	U.S. President Richard Nixon issues a proclamation creating Fossil Butte National Monument.
1970	April 1	The 1970 United States census enumerates the population of the State of Wyoming, later determined to be 332,416, an increase of 0.7% since the 1960 United States census. Wyoming becomes the 49th most populous of the 50 U.S. states.

== 1960s ==
Year	Date	Event
1968	December 2	U.S. President Lyndon B. Johnson signs An Act to establish a national trails system, and for other purposes, creating the National Trails System.
1967	January 2	Stanley K. Hathaway takes office as the twenty-seventh Governor of State of Wyoming.
1966	October 15	U.S. President Lyndon B. Johnson signs An Act to provide for the establishment of the Bighorn Canyon National Recreation Area, and for other purposes.
1963	January 7	Clifford P. Hansen takes office as the twenty-sixth Governor of State of Wyoming.
1961	January 2	Jack R. Gage takes office as the twenty-fifth Governor of State of Wyoming.
1960	April 29	U.S. President Dwight D. Eisenhower signs An Act to revise the boundaries and change the name of the Fort Laramie National Monument, Wyoming, and for other purposes, expanding Fort Laramie National Monument and changing the name to Fort Laramie National Historic Site.
1960	April 1	The 1960 United States census enumerates the population of the State of Wyoming, later determined to be 330,066, an increase of 13.6% since the 1950 United States census. Wyoming becomes the 48th most populous of the 50 U.S. states.

== 1950s ==
Year	Date	Event
1959	January 3	John J. Hickey takes office as the twenty-fourth Governor of State of Wyoming.
1957	spring	Buffalo Bill State Park, Wyoming's first state park, opens.
1955	January 3	Milward Simpson takes office as the twenty-third Governor of State of Wyoming.
1954	June 29	The Town of Frannie is incorporated.
1954	June 17	U.S. President Dwight D. Eisenhower signs An Act to authorize the abolishment of the Shoshone Cavern National Monument and the transfer of the land therein to the city of Cody, Wyoming, for public recreational use, and for other purposes.
1953	January 3	Clifford J. Rogers takes office as the twenty-second Governor of State of Wyoming.
1951	May 1	The Town of Hulett is incorporated.
1951	January 1	Frank A. Barrett takes office as the twenty-first Governor of State of Wyoming.
1950	September 14	U.S. President Harry Truman signs An Act to establish a new Grand Teton National Park in the State of Wyoming, and for other purposes, merging Jackson Hole National Monument into Grand Teton National Park.
1950	April 1	The 1950 United States census enumerates the population of the State of Wyoming, later determined to be 290,529, an increase of 15.9% since the 1940 United States census. Wyoming remains the 47th most populous of the 48 U.S. states.

== 1940s ==
Year	Date	Event
1949	January 3	Arthur G. Crane takes office as the twentieth Governor of State of Wyoming.
1945	September 2	World War II ends as the Empire of Japan formally surrenders.
1945	May 8	The war in Europe ends as the Greater German Empire formally surrenders.
1944	December 29	U.S. President Franklin D. Roosevelt vetoes House Resolution 2241, "To abolish the Jackson Hole National Monument as created by Presidential Proclamation Numbered 2578, dated March 15, 1943."
1943	March 15	U.S. President Franklin D. Roosevelt issues Executive Proclamation Number 2578, creating Jackson Hole National Monument.
1943	January 4	Lester C. Hunt takes office as the nineteenth Governor of State of Wyoming.
1942	November 3	The Town of Parco changes its name to the Town of Sinclair at the General Election of 1942.
1941	December 11	The United States declares war on the German Reich and the Italian Empire.
1941	December 8	The United States declares war on the Empire of Japan and enters World War II.
1941	March 10	U.S. President Franklin D. Roosevelt issues an executive order renaming Wyoming National Forest as the re-established Bridger National Forest.
1940	April 1	The 1940 United States census enumerates the population of the State of Wyoming, later determined to be 250,742, an increase of 11.2% since the 1930 United States census. Wyoming remains the 47th most populous of the 48 U.S. states.

== 1930s ==
Year	Date	Event
1939	January 2	Nels H. Smith takes office as the eighteenth Governor of State of Wyoming.
1938	July 16	U.S. President Franklin D. Roosevelt issues a proclamation creating Fort Laramie National Monument.
1938	April 18	The Town of La Grange is incorporated.
1937	July 22	U.S. President Franklin D. Roosevelt signs An Act to create the Farmers' Home Corporation, to promote more secure occupancy of farms and farm homes, to correct the economic instability resulting from some present forms of farm tenancy, and for other purposes, also known as the Bankhead-Jones Farm Tenant Act.
1935	August 6	The Town of Hanna is incorporated.
1933	May 3	U.S. President Franklin D. Roosevelt appoints Nellie Tayloe Ross as the 28th Director of the United States Mint, the first woman to hold the post. She will hold the office for twenty years.
1933	January 2	Leslie A. Miller takes office as the seventeenth Governor of State of Wyoming.
1932	January 1	The Town of Ten Sleep is incorporated.
1931	November 16	The Town of Green River passes the Green River ordinance that prohibits door-to-door selling. Other towns across the country will adopt the ordinance.
1931	February 18	Alonzo M. Clark takes office as the sixteenth Governor of State of Wyoming.
1930	September 13	The Town of Albin is incorporated.
1930	April 1	The 1930 United States census enumerates the population of the State of Wyoming, later determined to be 225,565, an increase of 16.0% since the 1920 United States census. Wyoming remains the 47th most populous of the 48 U.S. states.

== 1920s ==
Year	Date	Event
1929	July 10	U.S. President Calvin Coolidge signs An Act to establish the Grand Teton National Park in the State of Wyoming, and for other purposes.
1927	January 3	Frank C. Emerson takes office as the fifteenth Governor of State of Wyoming.
1925	November 3	The Town of Edgerton is incorporated.
1925	April 1	The Town of Parco is incorporated. (Changed name to the Town of Sinclair on November 3, 1942.)
1925	January 5	Nellie Tayloe Ross takes office as the fourteenth Governor of State of Wyoming. She becomes the first woman to be sworn in as governor of a U.S. state.
1924	October 2	Frank Lucas takes office as the thirteenth Governor of State of Wyoming.
1924	June 2	U.S. President Calvin Coolidge signs An Act To authorize the Secretary of the Interior to issue certificates of citizenship to Indians, also known as the Indian Citizenship Act of 1924, finally granting full United States Citizenship to all Native Americans born in the United States.
1923	May 14	U.S. President Warren G. Harding issues an executive order abolishing Bridger National Forest and transferring its land to Wyoming National Forest. (Wyoming National Forest will be renamed Bridger National Forest on March 10, 1941.)
1923	January 1	William B. Ross takes office as the twelfth Governor of State of Wyoming.
1922	May 1	The Town of Glendo is incorporated.
1922	April 15	Wyoming U.S. Senator John B. Kendrick introduces a resolution calling for an investigation into the Teapot Dome scandal.
1921	February 15	The State of Wyoming creates two new counties: Sublette County from portions of Fremont County and Lincoln County; and Teton County from a portion of Lincoln County.
1920	April 1	The 1920 United States census enumerates the population of the State of Wyoming, later determined to be 194,402, an increase of 33.2% since the 1910 United States census. Wyoming becomes the 47th most populous of the 48 U.S. states.

== 1910s ==
Year	Date	Event
1919	September 28	The Town of Ranchester is incorporated.
1919	January 6	Robert D. Carey takes office as the eleventh Governor of State of Wyoming.
1918	November 11	An armistice halts the Great War.
1917	April 6	The United States declares war on the German Empire and enters the Great War.
1917	February 26	Frank L. Houx takes office as the tenth Governor of State of Wyoming.
1917	January 29	The Town of Elmo is incorporated. (Annexed by the adjacent Town of Hanna on December 18, 1979.)
1916	August 25	U.S. President Woodrow Wilson signs An Act To establish a National Park Service, and for other purposes.
1916	March 8	The Town of Van Tassell is incorporated.
1915	January 4	John B. Kendrick takes office as the ninth Governor of State of Wyoming.
1914	August 7	The Town of Jackson is incorporated.
1914	August 4	The Town of Marbleton is incorporated.
1914	August 3	The Town of Opal is incorporated.
1914	May 14	The Town of Dubois is incorporated.
1914	April 21	The Town of Wamsutter is incorporated.
1913	July 1	The Town of Kaycee is incorporated.
1913	April 1	The Town of Big Piney is incorporated.
1912	February 12	The Town of Pinedale is incorporated.
1911	June 30	U.S. President William Howard Taft issues proclamations creating Washakie National Forest and Bridger National Forest. (Bridger National Forest will be abolished May 14, 1923, but re-established March 10, 1941.)
1911	February 21	The State of Wyoming creates seven new counties: Campbell County from portions of Crook County and Weston County; Goshen County from a portion of Laramie County; Hot Springs County from portions of Big Horn County, Fremont County, and Hot Springs County; Lincoln County from a portion of Uinta County; Niobrara County from a portion of Converse County; Platte County from a portion of Laramie County; and Washakie County from a portion of Big Horn County.
1911	January 2	Joseph M. Carey takes office as the eighth Governor of State of Wyoming.
1910	July 1	U.S. President William Howard Taft issues a proclamation re-establishing Medicine Bow National Forest.
1910	June 28	U.S. President William Howard Taft issues a proclamation creating Palisade National Forest.
1910	May 31	The Town of Cokeville is incorporated.
1910	May 10	The Town of Powell is incorporated.
1910	April 1	The 1910 United States census enumerates the population of the State of Wyoming, later determined to be 145,965, an increase of 57.7% since the 1900 United States census. Wyoming becomes the 45th most populous of the 46 U.S. states.

== 1900s ==
Year	Date	Event
1909	September 24	The State of Wyoming creates Park County from a portion of Big Horn County.
1909	September 21	U.S. President William Howard Taft issues an executive order creating Shoshone Cavern National Monument.
1909	June 6	The Town of Medicine Bow is incorporated.
1909	June 1	The Town of Lost Cabin is incorporated.
1909	May 14	The Town of Pine Bluffs is incorporated.
1909	May 12	The Town of Rock River is incorporated.
1909	February 4	The Town of Hudson is incorporated.
1908	October 18	The Town of Upton is incorporated.
1908	July 2	U.S. President Theodore Roosevelt issues an executive order creating Bighorn National Forest.
1908	July 1	U.S. President Theodore Roosevelt issues executive orders creating Targhee National Forest, Teton National Forest, Wyoming National Forest, Bonneville National Forest, Ashley National Forest, and Shoshone National Forest.
1908	June 30	U.S. President Theodore Roosevelt issues an executive order creating Cheyenne National Forest.
1908	June 26	U.S. President Theodore Roosevelt issues an executive order creating Sundance National Forest.
1908	June 25	U.S. President Theodore Roosevelt issues an executive order creating Hayden National Forest.
1908	May 11	U.S. President Theodore Roosevelt issues an executive order creating Lewis and Clark Cavern National Monument.
1908	March 28	Two coal gas explosions in the Union Pacific Coal Company's Hanna Mine No. 1 kill 59 miners.
1907	July 8	The Town of Sheridan is incorporated.
1907	March 1	U.S. President Theodore Roosevelt issues a proclamation creating the Bear Lodge Forest Reserve.
1907	January 15	U.S. President Theodore Roosevelt issues a proclamation creating the Caribou Forest Reserve.
1907	January 4	The Town of Torrington is incorporated.
1906	November 5	U.S. President Theodore Roosevelt issues a proclamation creating the Sierra Madre Forest Reserve.
1906	October 2	The Town of Moorcroft is incorporated.
1906	October 2	The Town of Riverton is incorporated.
1906	September 24	U.S. President Theodore Roosevelt issues a proclamation creating Devils Tower National Monument, the first United States National Monument created under the Antiquities Act.
1906	July 2	The Town of Dayton is incorporated.
1906	June 8	U.S. President Theodore Roosevelt signs An Act For the preservation of American antiquities, also known as the Antiquities Act of 1906, giving the President of the United States the authority to create national monuments on federal lands to protect significant natural, cultural, or scientific features.
1906	April 2	The Town of Shoshoni is incorporated.
1906	March 30	The Town of Worland is incorporated.
1906	January 16	U.S. President Theodore Roosevelt issues a proclamation creating the Uinta Forest Reserve.
1905	November 18	The Town of Wheatland is incorporated.
1905	January 2	Bryant B. Brooks takes office as the seventh Governor of State of Wyoming.
1903	June 30	A coal gas explosion in the Union Pacific Coal Company's Hanna Mine No. 1 kills 169 miners.
1903	April 28	Fenimore Chatterton takes office as the sixth Governor of State of Wyoming.
1902	July 7	The Town of Basin is incorporated.
1902	May 22	U.S. President Theodore Roosevelt issues a proclamation creating the Yellowstone Forest Reserve and the Medicine Bow Forest Reserve.
1902	April 24	The Town of Afton is incorporated.
1902	April 4	The Town of Guernsey is incorporated.
1901	October 1	The Town of Cody is incorporated.
1901	August 7	The Town of Meeteetse is incorporated.
1901	April 2	The Town of Encampment is incorporated.
1901	March 2	The Town of Diamondville is incorporated.
1900	October 10	U.S. President William McKinley issues a proclamation creating the Crow Creek Forest Reserve.
1900	July 1	The Town of Saratoga is incorporated.
1900	April 28	A coal gas explosion in the Union Pacific Coal Company's Hanna Mine No. 1 kills miner Henry Ward.
1900	April 1	The 1900 United States census enumerates the population of the State of Wyoming, later determined to be 92,531, an increase of 47.9% since the 1890 United States census. Wyoming becomes the 44th most populous of the 45 U.S. states.
1900	February 17	The Town of Hartville is incorporated.

== 1890s ==
Year	Date	Event
1899	January 23	The Town of Kemmerer is incorporated.
1899	January 21	The Town of Thermopolis is incorporated.
1899	January 2	DeForest Richards takes office as the fifth Governor of State of Wyoming.
1898	December 10	The United States of America and the Kingdom of Spain sign the Treaty of Paris of 1898 to end the Spanish–American War.
1898	September 19	U.S. President William McKinley issues a proclamation creating the Black Hills Forest Reserve.
1898	August 12	The United States of America and the Kingdom of Spain sign a Protocol of Peace.
1898	June 17	The Town of Lusk is incorporated.
1898	April 23	The Kingdom of Spain declares war on the United States of America. The United States declares war on Spain two days later.
1897	September 23	Cheyenne hosts the first Cheyenne Frontier Days.
1897	February 22	U.S. President Grover Cleveland issues proclamations creating the Teton Forest Reserve and the Big Horn Forest Reserve.
1895	January 7	William A. Richards takes office as the fourth Governor of State of Wyoming.
1893	January 2	John E. Osborne takes office as the third Governor of State of Wyoming.
1892	January 7	The Town of Gillette is incorporated.
1891	November 24	Amos W. Barber takes office as the second Governor of State of Wyoming.
1891	June 10	The Town of Green River is re-incorporated under the laws of the State of Wyoming.
1891	March 30	U.S. President Benjamin Harrison issues a proclamation creating the Yellowstone Park Timber Land Reserve, the first United States National Forest.
1891	March 3	U.S. President Benjamin Harrison signs An act to repeal timber-culture laws, and for other purposes, also known as the Forest Reserve Act of 1891, giving the President of the United States the authority to create protected national forests on federal lands.
1890	October 11	Territorial Governor Francis E. Warren takes office as the first Governor of State of Wyoming.
1890	July 17	The Town of Lander is incorporated.
1890	July 10	U.S. President Benjamin Harrison signs An Act to provide for the admission of the State of Wyoming into the Union, and for other purposes. The Territory of Wyoming becomes the State of Wyoming, the 44th U.S. state and the first U.S. state to grant women the right to vote. Wyoming later becomes known as the Equality State.
1890	April 1	The 1890 United States census enumerates the population of the Territory of Wyoming, later determined to be 62,555, an increase of 200.9% since the 1880 United States census. Wyoming becomes the fifth most populous of the six U.S. territories.
1890	March 12	The Territory of Wyoming creates two new counties: Big Horn County from portions of Fremont County, Johnson County, and Sheridan County; and Weston County from a portion of Crook County.

== 1880s ==
Year	Date	Event
1889	October 25	The Town of Newcastle is incorporated.
1889	July 8	The Town of Casper is incorporated.
1889	April 9	U.S. President Benjamin Harrison appoints Francis E. Warren the tenth (and last) Governor of Territory of Wyoming.
1888	June 1	The Town of Evanston is incorporated.
1888	March 9	The Territory of Wyoming creates three new counties: Converse County from portions of Albany County and Laramie County; Natrona County from a portion of Carbon County; and Sheridan County from a portion of Johnson County.
1887	October 5	The Town of Sundance is incorporated.
1887	June 8	The Town of Douglas is incorporated.
1887	January 24	U.S. President Grover Cleveland appoints Thomas Moonlight the ninth Governor of Territory of Wyoming.
1886	December 20	U.S. President Grover Cleveland appoints Elliot S.N. Morgan the eighth Governor of Territory of Wyoming.
1886	November 11	U.S. President Grover Cleveland appoints George W. Baxter the seventh Governor of Territory of Wyoming.
1886	March 12	The Town of Rawlins is incorporated.
1886	March 4	The Territory of Wyoming establishes the University of Wyoming.
1885	September 2	White immigrant miners riot and kill 28 Chinese immigrant miners and burn 78 homes in the Rock Springs massacre.
1885	February 28	U.S. President Chester A. Arthur appoints Francis E. Warren the sixth Governor of Territory of Wyoming.
1885	January 13	U.S. President Chester A. Arthur appoints Elliot S.N. Morgan the fifth Governor of Territory of Wyoming.
1884	April 4	The Town of Buffalo is incorporated.
1884	April 1	The Territory of Wyoming creates Fremont County from a portion of Sweetwater County.
1882	July 18	U.S. President Chester A. Arthur appoints William Hale the fourth Governor of Territory of Wyoming.
1880	April 1	The 1880 United States census enumerates the population of the Territory of Wyoming, later determined to be 20,789, an increase of 128.0% since the 1880 United States census. Wyoming becomes the least populous of the eight U.S. territories.

== 1870s ==
Year	Date	Event
1879	December 13	The Territory of Wyoming changes the name of Pease County to Johnson County.
1878	April 10	U.S. President Rutherford B. Hayes appoints John Wesley Hoyt the third Governor of Territory of Wyoming.
1876	July 4	The Territory of Wyoming celebrates the Centennial of the United States of America while still reeling from the defeat of Lieutenant Colonel George Armstrong Custer and the 7th Cavalry Regiment at the Battle of the Little Bighorn on June 26.
1875	December 8	The Territory of Wyoming creates two new counties: Crook County from portions of Albany County and Laramie County; and Pease County from portions of Albany County, Carbon County and Sweetwater County.
1875	March 1	U.S. President Ulysses S. Grant appoints John Milton Thayer the second Governor of Territory of Wyoming.
1874	January 13	The Town of Laramie is incorporated.
1872	March 1	U.S. President Ulysses S. Grant signs An Act to set apart a certain tract of land lying near the headwaters of the Yellowstone River as a public park, creating Yellowstone National Park, the world's first national park.
1870	April 1	The 1870 United States census enumerates the population of the Territory of Wyoming, later determined to be 9,118. Wyoming becomes the least populous of the nine U.S. territories.

== 1860s ==
Year	Date	Event
1869	December 16	The Union Pacific Railroad arrives in Evanston.
1869	December 10	The first session of the Wyoming Territorial Legislature meets in Cheyenne. The legislature passes and Territorial Governor Campbell signs an act to re-incorporate the Town of Cheyenne, Wyoming Territory, and an act granting white women the right to vote, the first U.S. state or territory to grant suffrage to women.
1869	December 1	Wyoming Territorial Governor John Allen Campbell creates a fifth original county: Uinta County.
1869	May 24	John Wesley Powell launches the Powell Geographic Expedition from Green River.
1869	April 5	U.S. President Ulysses S. Grant appoints John Allen Campbell the first Governor of Territory of Wyoming.
1868	December 16	The provisional legislature of Wyoming creates four original counties: Albany County, Carbon County, Laramie County (previously Laramie County, Dakota Territory), and Sweetwater County (previously Carter County, Dakota Territory).
1868	October 1	The Union Pacific Railroad arrives in Green River.
1868	August 21	The Town of Green River, Wyoming Territory is incorporated under the laws of the previous Territory of Dakota. (Re-incorporated under the laws of the State of Wyoming on June 10, 1891.)
1868	August 8	The Union Pacific Railroad arrives in Rawlins Springs.
1868	July 25	U.S. President Andrew Johnson signs An Act to provide a temporary Government for the Territory of Wyoming which creates the Territory of Wyoming from the portion of the Territory of Dakota west of the 27th meridian west from Washington, and the portions of Territory of Idaho and the Territory of Utah east of the 34th meridian west from Washington. The boundaries of the Territory of Wyoming remain unchanged to the present-day State of Wyoming.
1868	May 4	The Union Pacific Railroad arrives in Laramie.
1867	December 27	The Territory of Dakota creates Carter County, Dakota Territory from a portion of Laramie County, Dakota Territory.
1867	November 13	The Union Pacific Railroad arrives in Cheyenne.
1867	September 8	The United States Army establishes Fort D.A. Russell three miles (5 km) west of Cheyenne to protect the railroad.
1867	August 8	The Town of Cheyenne, Dakota Territory (formerly Crow Creek Crossing) is incorporated. (Re-incorporated under the laws of the Territory of Wyoming on December 10, 1869.)
1867	July 5	The Union Pacific Railroad plats the townsite of Crow Creek Crossing, Dakota Territory.
1867	January 9	The Territory of Dakota creates Laramie County, Dakota Territory.
1865	May 9	U.S. President Andrew Johnson proclaims the end of the American Civil War.
1864	summer	Civil engineer James A. Evans of the Union Pacific Railroad locates a pass in the Black Hills (later the Laramie Mountains) of the Territory of Dakota through which the Transcontinental Railroad could pass.
1864	May 26	U.S. President Abraham Lincoln signs An Act to provide a temporary Government for the Territory of Montana. In addition to creating the free Territory of Montana, the act transfers the portion of the Territory of Idaho "included within the following boundaries, to wit: commencing at a point formed by the intersection of the thirty-third degree of longitude west from Washington with the forty-first degree of north latitude; thence along said thirty-third degree of longitude to the crest of the Rocky Mountains; thence northward along the said crest of the Rocky Mountains to its intersection with the forty-fourth degree and thirty minutes of north latitude; thence eastward along said forty-fourth degree thirty minutes north latitude to the thirty-fourth degree of longitude west from Washington; thence northward along said thirty-fourth degree of longitude to its intersection with the forty-fifth degree north latitude; thence eastward along said forty-fifth degree of north latitude to its intersection with the twenty-seventh degree of longitude west from Washington; thence south along said twenty-seventh degree of longitude west from Washington to the forty-first degree north latitude; thence west along said forty-first degree of latitude to the place of beginning," back to the Territory of Dakota.
1863	March 3	U.S. President Abraham Lincoln signs An Act to provide a Temporary Government for the Territory of Idaho. The free Territory of Idaho encompasses all of the future State of Wyoming except the southwest corner lying south of the 43rd parallel north and west of the 27th meridian west from Washington which remains in the Territory of Utah.
1861	June 6	Jefferson Territorial Governor Robert Williamson Steele proclaims the Territory of Jefferson officially disbanded.
1861	April 12	The American Civil War begins with the Battle of Fort Sumter.
1861	March 4	Abraham Lincoln assumes office as the 16th President of the United States.
1861	March 2	Outgoing U.S. President James Buchanan signs An Act to provide a temporary government for the Territory of Dakota, and to create the office of surveyor general therein. The free Territory of Dakota encompasses the northeast portion of the future State of Wyoming lying north of the 43rd parallel north and east of the Continental Divide of the Americas. South of the 43rd parallel north, the Territory of Nebraska is extended westward from the Continental Divide of the Americas to the 27th meridian west from Washington, annexing the eastern portions of the Territory of Utah and the Territory of Washington.
1861	February 8	The seven secessionist slave states create the Confederate States of America.
1860	November 6	Abraham Lincoln is elected President of the United States. Seven slave states will secede from the United States of America before February 8, 1861.

== 1850s ==
Year	Date	Event
1859	October 24	Voters of the Pike's Peak goldfields approve the establishment of the Provisional Government of the Territory of Jefferson. The proposed territory includes the portion of the future State of Wyoming south of the 43rd parallel north and east of the 110th meridian west. (Note: The Constitution of the Provisional Government of the Territory of Jefferson states its boundaries as "Commencing at a point where the 37th degree of north latitude, crosses the 102nd degree of west longitude, and running north on said meridian to the 43d degree of north latitude; thence west on said parallel to the 110th degree of west longitude; thence south on said meridian to the 37th degree of north latitude; thence east on the said parallel to the place of beginning.")
1859	February 14	U.S. President James Buchanan signs An Act for the Admission of Oregon into the Union. The Territory of Washington now includes the western portion of the future State of Wyoming lying north of the 42nd parallel north and southwest of the Continental Divide of the Americas.
1854	May 30	U.S. President Franklin Pierce signs An Act to Organize the Territories of Nebraska and Kansas. The Territory of Nebraska includes all of the future State of Wyoming northeast of the Continental Divide of the Americas.
1853	March 2	U.S. President Millard Fillmore signs An Act to establish the Territorial Government of Washington.
1851	April 5	The State of Deseret dissolves and yields to the Territory of Utah.
1850	September 9	The Territory of New Mexico and the Territory of Utah are established as part of the Compromise of 1850. U.S. President Millard Fillmore signs An Act to establish a Territorial Government for Utah. The Territory of Utah includes the southwestern portion of the future State of Wyoming lying south of the 42nd parallel north and west of the Continental Divide of the Americas.
1850	summer	Jim Bridger leads the Stansbury Expedition across a mountain pass on the Continental Divide of the Americas near the south Great Divide Basin bifurcation point, later known as Bridger Pass. Bridger Pass will become the crossing point for the Overland Trail and the Pony Express.

== 1840s ==
Year	Date	Event
1849	June 26	The U.S. Army purchases Fort John from the American Fur Company for $4,000 and renames it Fort Laramie. The fort becomes the headquarters for the Regiment of Mounted Rifles. With Army protection, Fort Laramie becomes a major stop on the Emigrant Trail, the Bozeman Trail, Pony Express route, the Deadwood and Cheyenne Stage route, and the route of the first transcontinental telegraph.
1849	March 10	The Mormon settlers of the Great Salt Lake Valley form the Provisional Government of the State of Deseret. Brigham Young is elected Governor. Deseret encompasses almost all of the present U.S. states of Utah and Nevada, and portions of Oregon, Idaho, Wyoming, Colorado, New Mexico, Arizona, and California, although only the Wasatch Front was occupied. (Note: The Constitution of the State of Deseret states its boundaries as "commencing at the 33 degree of north latitude where it crosses the 108 degree of longitude west of Greenwich thence running south and west to and down the main channel of the Gila River on the northern line of Mexico and on the northern boundary of Lower California to the Pacific Ocean thence along the coast north westerly to 118 degrees 30 minutes of west longitude thence north to where said line intersects the dividing ridge of the Sierra Nevada mountains thence north along the summit of the Sierra Nevada mountains to the dividing range of mountains that separates the waters flowing into the Columbia River from the waters running into the Great Basin thence easterly along the dividing range of mountains that separates said waters flowing into the Columbia River on the north from the waters flowing into the Great Basin on the south to the summit of the Wind River chain of mountains thence south east and south by the dividing range of mountains that separate the waters flowing into the Gulf of Mexico from the waters flowing into the Gulf of California to the place of beginning as set forth in a map drawn by Charles Preuss and published by order of the Senate of the United States in 1848." This ambitious claim included the future cities of Las Vegas, Phoenix, San Diego, and Los Angeles.) Although the proposed State of Deseret includes the southwestern portion of the future State of Wyoming, it has no actual presence in the region. Deseret served as the de facto government of the Wasatch Front until the Provisional State was dissolved on April 4, 1851.
1848	August 14	U.S. President James K. Polk signs An Act to Establish the Territorial Government of Oregon. The Territory of Oregon includes the western portion of the future State of Wyoming lying north of the 42nd parallel north and southwest of the Continental Divide of the Americas. The rest of the future state remains unorganized United States territory.
1848	February 2	The United States and United Mexican States sign the Treaty of Guadalupe Hidalgo to end the Mexican–American War. Mexico relinquishes all of its northern territories. All land in the future State of Wyoming becomes unorganized United States territory.
1846	May 13	The United States declares war on the Mexican Republic.
1846	February 14	The State of Texas cedes the territorial claims of the Republic of Texas to the United States. The boundaries of the State of Texas within those territorial claims remain undefined. The United States now claims the Rio Grande as its border with Mexico.
1845	December 29	The United States admits the Republic of Texas to the Union as the slave State of Texas but declines to define its borders. The Mexican Republic maintains that Texas is still its territory by the Treaty of Limits of 1828 and states that it will fight to regain Texas.
1842	spring	Jim Bridger and Louis Vasquez establish Fort Bridger along Blacks Fork of the Green River in the Mexican territory of Alta California. Fort Bridger will become an important stop on the Emigrant Trail.
1841	autumn	The American Fur Company completes a $10,000 adobe replacement for Fort William now named Fort John.
1840	autumn	Lancaster Lupton establishes Fort Platte 1 mile (1.6 km) north of Fort William at the confluence of the Laramie River and the North Platte River.

== 1830s ==
Year	Date	Event
1836	May 14	Texians force captured General Santa Anna to sign the coerced Treaties of Velasco recognizing the independence of the Republic of Texas. Mexico neither acknowledges nor ratifies these treaties. Based upon these treaties, the Republic of Texas claims as its eastern and northern border the Adams–Onís border with the United States and as its western and southern border the Rio Grande to its headwaters, thence north along meridian 107°32′35″ west to the Adams–Onís border with the United States. (Note: The Republic of Texas claimed as its eastern and northern border the Adams–Onís border with the United States and as its western and southern border the Rio Grande to its headwaters, thence north along meridian 107°32′35″ west to the Adams–Onís border with the United States. The western extent of this claim was dubious since the Republic of Texas never occupied any territory west of the 102nd meridian west.) The disputed region will later become portions of the future U.S. states of Wyoming, Colorado, Kansas, Oklahoma, Texas, and New Mexico.
1834	May 31	William Sublette and Robert Campbell establish Fort William at the confluence of the Laramie River and the North Platte River. Fort William is the first American settlement in the future State of Wyoming and will become an important stop on the Emigrant Trail.

== 1820s ==
Year	Date	Event
1828	January 12	The United States and the United Mexican States sign the Treaty of Limits affirming the boundaries set by the Adams–Onís Treaty of 1819.
1821	August 24	Ferdinand VII of Spain signs the Treaty of Córdoba recognizing the independence of the Mexican Empire. The southwestern portion of the future State of Wyoming lying south of the 42nd parallel north and west of the Continental Divide of the Americas becomes part of the Mexican territory of Alta California, although there is no Mexican presence in the region.
1821	August 10	The State of Missouri is admitted to the Union. The rest of the Territory of Missouri becomes unorganized United States territory.
1821	March 2	U.S. President James Monroe signs An Act to authorize the people of the Missouri territory to form a constitution and state government, and for the admission of such state into the Union on an equal footing with the original states, and to prohibit slavery in certain territories.
1821	February 22	The Adams–Onís Treaty of 1819 takes effect. All land in the future State of Wyoming north of the 42nd parallel north or east of the meridian 106°20'35" west becomes part of the Territory of Missouri. Land south of the 42nd parallel north and west of the meridian 106°20'35" west remains part of the New Spain (Nueva España) province of New Mexico (Santa Fe de Nuevo México).

== 1810s ==
Year	Date	Event
1819	February 22	The United States and the restored Kingdom of Spain sign the Adams–Onís Treaty. The United States relinquinshes its claim to land west of the 100th meridian west of Greenwich and southwest of the Arkansas River and south of the 42nd parallel north. Spain relinquishes Florida and all claims to land north of the 42nd parallel in North America.
1814		William Clark publishes A Map of Lewis and Clark's Track Across the Western Portion of North America from the Mississippi to the Pacific Ocean which includes the route of John Colter's explorations in 1807–1808.
1812	October 22	Robert Stuart and six companions from the Pacific Fur Company cross South Pass, the lowest point on the Continental Divide of the Americas between the Central Rocky Mountains and the Southern Rocky Mountains. South Pass will become the crossing point for the Oregon Trail, the California Trail, and the Mormon Trail.
1812	June 4	U.S. President James Madison signs An Act providing for the government of the territory of Missouri. The Territory of Louisiana is renamed the Territory of Missouri. The Territory of Missouri includes all land in the future State of Wyoming northeast of the Continental Divide of the Americas.
1810	August 1	Mexican priest Miguel Gregorio Antonio Ignacio Hidalgo-Costilla y Gallaga Mandarte Villaseñor (Hidalgo) proclaims the independence of Mexico from the Napoleonic Kingdom of Spain in the village of Dolores.

== 1800s ==
Year	Date	Event
1807	autumn	Mountain man John Colter becomes the first person from the United States to enter the future State of Wyoming. Colter's description of geysers, fumaroles, and mudpots along the Shoshone River led to the area being known as Colter's Hell.
1805	March 3	U.S. President Thomas Jefferson signs An Act further providing for the government of the district of Louisiana. The District of Louisiana is reorganized as the self-governing Territory of Louisiana. The Territory of Louisiana includes all land in the future State of Wyoming northeast of the Continental Divide of the Americas.
1804	October 1	The District of Louisiana is organized under the jurisdiction of the Territory of Indiana.
1804	March 26	U.S. President Thomas Jefferson signs An Act erecting Louisiana into two territories, and providing for the temporary government thereof. The portion of the Louisiana Purchase north of the 33rd parallel north is designated the military District of Louisiana.
1803	December 20	The French Republic turns its colony of La Louisiane over to the United States. All land in the future State of Wyoming northeast of the Continental Divide of the Americas becomes unorganized United States territory.
1803	April 30	The United States and the French Republic sign the Louisiana Purchase Treaty.
1800	October 1	Under pressure from Napoléon Bonaparte, the Kingdom of Spain transfers the colony of la Luisiana back to the French Republic with the secret Third Treaty of San Ildefonso.

== 1790s ==
Year	Date	Event

== 1780s ==
Year	Date	Event
1783	September 3	The Treaty of Paris is signed in Paris by representatives of King George III of Great Britain and representatives of the United States of America. The treaty affirms the independence of the United States and sets the Mississippi River as its western boundary.

== 1770s ==
Year	Date	Event
1776	July 4	Representatives of the thirteen United States of America sign the Declaration of Independence from the Kingdom of Great Britain.

== 1760s ==
Year	Date	Event
1762	November 13	Fearing the loss of its American territories in the Seven Years' War, the Kingdom of France transfers its colony of La Louisiane to the Kingdom of Spain with the secret Treaty of Fontainebleau.

== 1690s ==
Year	Date	Event

== 1680s ==
Year	Date	Event
1682	April 9	René-Robert Cavelier, Sieur de La Salle, claims the Mississippi River and its watershed for the Kingdom of France and names the region La Louisiane in honor of King Louis XIV. The Mississippi Basin is later determined to be the fourth most extensive on Earth and includes lands inhabited by hundreds of thousands of native peoples and lands previously claimed by Spain, France, and England. The Louisiane claim includes all land in the future State of Wyoming northeast of the Continental Divide of the Americas. This will set up a rivalry among native peoples, France, Spain, and eventually the United States in the area.

=== 1590s ===
Year	Date	Event
1598	July 12	Don Juan de Oñate Salazar establishes the New Spain (Nueva España) colony of Santa Fe de Nuevo Méjico at the village of San Juan de los Caballeros adjacent to the Ohkay Owingeh Pueblo at the confluence of the Rio Grande (río Bravo) and the río Chama. At its greatest extent, the colony encompassed all of the present U.S. state of New Mexico and portions of Arizona, Utah, Colorado, Wyoming, Nebraska, Kansas, Oklahoma, Texas, and the Mexican state of Chihuahua. (Note: At its greatest territorial extent, the Spanish Empire claimed that the border of its colony of New Mexico (Santa Fe de Nuevo México) began where the 31st parallel north crossed 100th meridian west, thence north along the 100th meridian west to the 42nd parallel north, thence west along the 42nd parallel north to the Green River (río Español), thence down the Green River to its confluence with the Colorado River (río Colorado), thence down the Colorado River to its confluence with the Gila River (río Gila), thence up the Gila River up to its confluence with its East Fork and West Fork, thence south along the meridian 108°12′22″ west to the 31st parallel north, thence east along the 31st parallel north back to the 100th meridian west.)

== 1540s ==
Year	Date	Event
1541	June 28	A Spanish military expedition led by Hernando de Soto, Governor of Cuba, become the first Europeans to cross the Mississippi River.

== 1510s ==
Year	Date	Event
1513	September 29	Spanish conquistador Vasco Núñez de Balboa crosses the Isthmus of Panama and arrives on the shore of a sea that he names Mar del Sur (the South Sea, later named the Pacific Ocean). He claims the sea and all adjacent lands for the Queen of Castile. This includes the portion of the future State of Wyoming southwest of the Continental Divide of the Americas.

== 1490s ==
Year	Date	Event
1493	May 5	Pope Alexander VI (born Roderic de Borja in Valencia) issues the papal bull Inter caetera which splits the non-Christian world into two halves. The eastern half goes to the King of Portugal for his exploration, conquest, conversion, and exploitation. The western half (including all of North America) goes to the Queen of Castile and the King of Aragon for their exploration, conquest, conversion, and exploitation. The indigenous peoples of the Americas have no idea that any of these people exist.
1492	October 12	Genoese seaman Cristòffa Cómbo (Christopher Columbus) leading an expedition for Queen Isabella I of Castile lands on the Lucayan island of Guanahani that he renames San Salvador. This begins the Spanish conquest of the Americas.

== Before 1492 ==
Era	Event
c. 12,000 BCE	During a centuries long period of warming, ice-age Paleoamericans from Beringia begin using the ice-free corridor east of the Rocky Mountains to migrate throughout the Americas.

2000s 1900s 1800s Statehood Territory 1700s 1600s 1500s Before 1492

== See also ==
History of Wyoming

- Bibliography of Wyoming history
  - Bibliography of Yellowstone National Park
- Emigrant Trail in Wyoming
- List of counties in Wyoming
- List of ghost towns in Wyoming
- List of governors of Wyoming
- List of Wyoming state legislatures
- List of municipalities in Wyoming
- Outline of Wyoming
- Outline of Wyoming territorial evolution
  - Territory of Wyoming
  - State of Wyoming
- Timeline of Wyoming history
  - Timeline of Cheyenne, Wyoming
