= History of Wyoming =

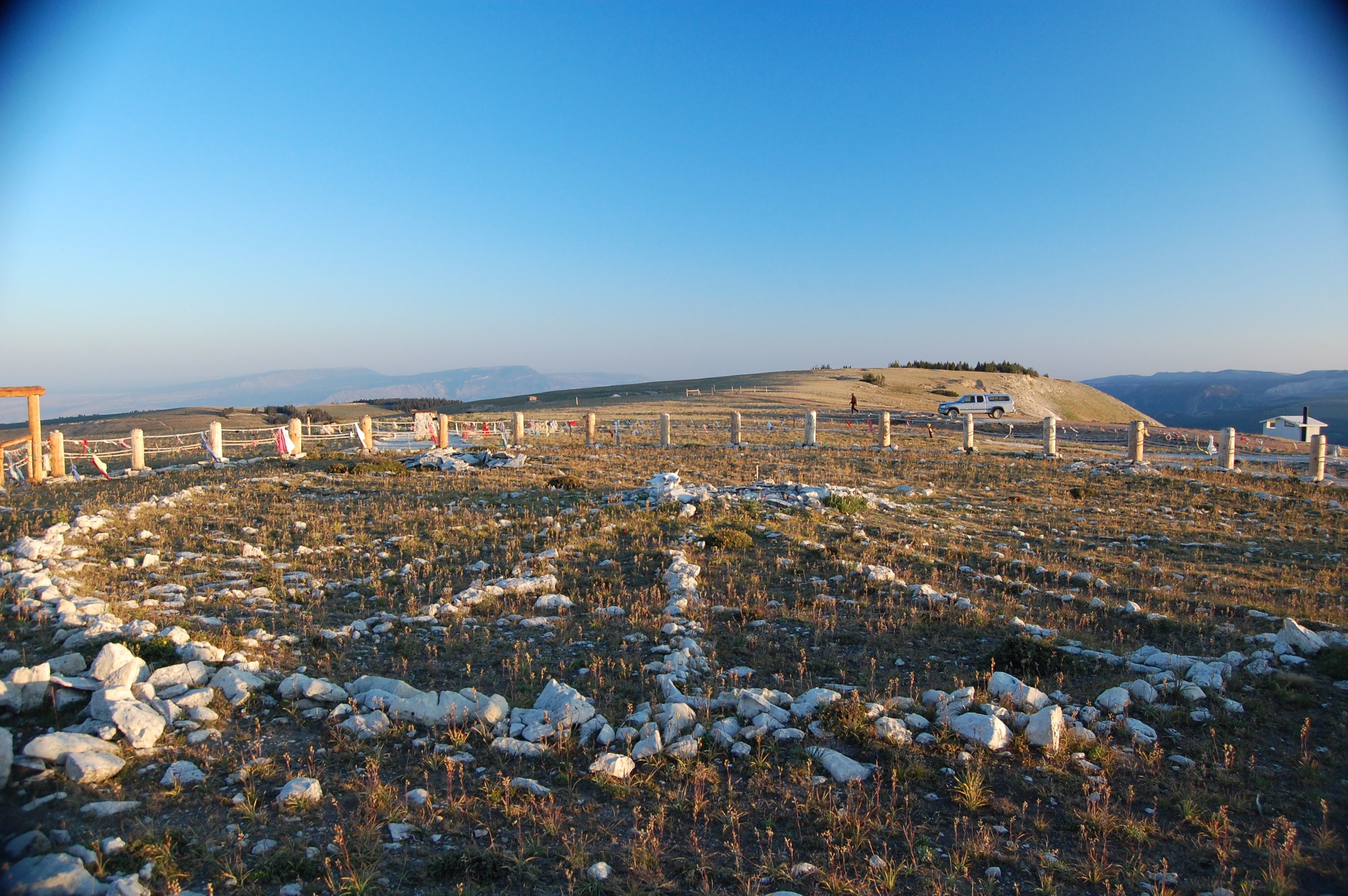
Big Horn Medicine Wheel 2011

Wyoming, 1883

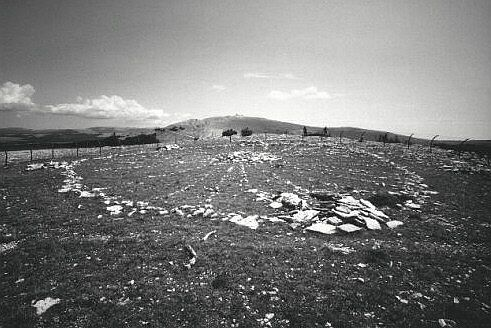
Big Horn medicine wheel

There is evidence of prehistoric human habitation in the region known today as the U.S. state of Wyoming stretching back roughly 13,000 years. Stone projectile points associated with the Clovis, Folsom and Plano cultures have been discovered throughout Wyoming. Evidence from what is now Yellowstone National Park indicates the presence of vast continental trading networks since around 1,000 years ago.

The Union Pacific Railroad played a central role in the European colonization of the area. Wyoming would become a U.S. territory in 1868. It was the first state to grant women the right to vote in 1869 (although it was then still a territory). Wyoming would become a U.S. state on July 10, 1890, as the 44th state.

== Native American settlement ==
There is evidence of prehistoric human habitation in the region known today as the U.S. state of Wyoming stretching back roughly 13,000 years. Stone projectile points associated with the Clovis, Folsom, and Plano cultures have been discovered throughout Wyoming. In the Big Horn Mountains there is a medicine wheel that has not yet been dated accurately due to disruption of the site before the two archaeological excavations of 1958 and 1978. However, the Big Horn Medicine Wheel's design of twenty-eight spokes is similar to the Majorville Medicine Wheel in Canada that has been dated at 3200 BCE (5200 years ago) by careful stratification of known artifact types. Throughout the Bighorn Mountains, south to Medicine Lodge Creek, artifacts of occupation date back 10,000 years. Large ceremonial blades chipped from obsidian rock formations in what is now Yellowstone National Park to the west of the Bighorns, have been found in the Hopewell burial mounds of Southern Ohio, indicative of vast continental trading networks since around 1000 years ago. When White explorers first entered the region, they encountered numerous American Indian tribes including the Arapaho, Bannock, Blackfeet, Cheyenne, Crow, Gros Ventre, Kiowa, Nez Perce, Sioux, Shoshone and Ute.

== Early European observations ==
Europeans may have ventured into the northern sections of the state in the 18th century. Most of the southern part of modern-day Wyoming was nominally claimed by Spain and Mexico until the 1830s, but they had no presence. John Colter, a member of the Lewis and Clark Expedition, was probably the first American to enter the region in 1807. His reports of thermal activity in the Yellowstone area were considered at the time to be fictional. Robert Stuart and a party of five men returning from Astoria, Oregon discovered South Pass in 1812. The route was later followed by the Oregon Trail. In 1850, Jim Bridger located what is now known as Bridger Pass, which was later used by both the Union Pacific Railroad in 1868, and in the 20th century by Interstate 80. Bridger also explored the Yellowstone region and like Colter, most of his reports on that region of the state were considered at the time to be tall tales. During the early 19th century, fur trappers known as mountain men flocked to the mountains of western Wyoming in search of beaver. In 1824, the first mountain man rendezvous was held in Wyoming. The gatherings continued annually until 1840, with the majority of them held within Wyoming territory.

== Immigration trails ==
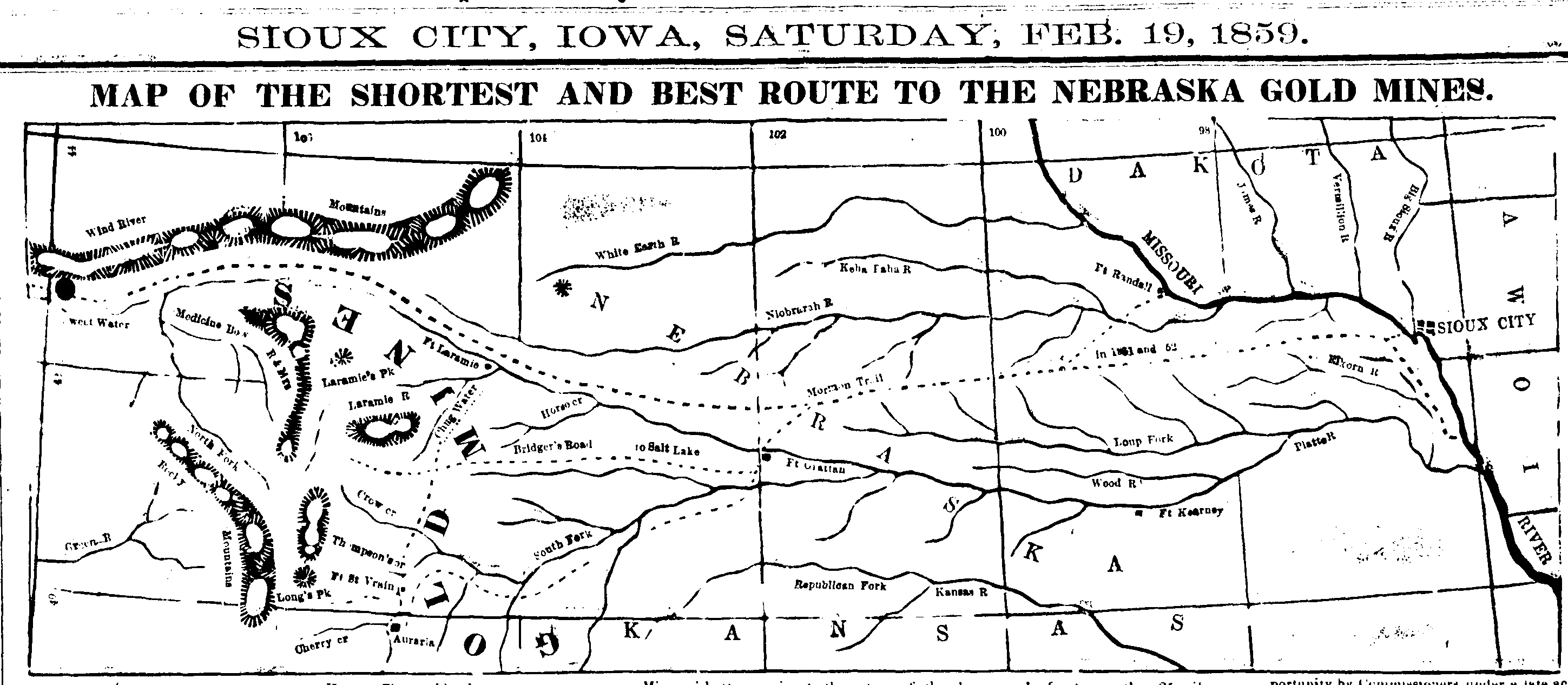
1859 map of route from Sioux City, Iowa, through Nebraska, to gold fields of Wyoming, partially following old Mormon trails.

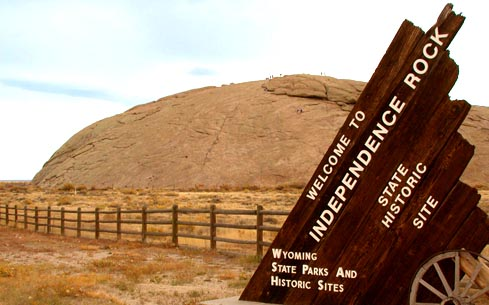
Independence Rock, a famous Wyoming landmark along the Oregon Trail

The route later known as the Oregon Trail was already in regular use by traders and explorers in the early 1830s. The trail snakes across Wyoming, entering the state on the eastern border near the present day town of Torrington following the North Platte River to the current town of Casper. It then crosses South Pass, and exits on the western side of the state near Cokeville. In 1847, Mormon emigrants blazed the Mormon Trail, which mirrors the Oregon Trail, but splits off at South Pass and continues south to Fort Bridger and into Utah. Over 350,000 emigrants followed these trails to destinations in Utah, California and Oregon between 1840 and 1859. In 1859, gold was discovered in Montana, drawing miners north along the Bozeman and Bridger trails through the Powder River Country and Big Horn Basin respectively.

== Indian Wars ==
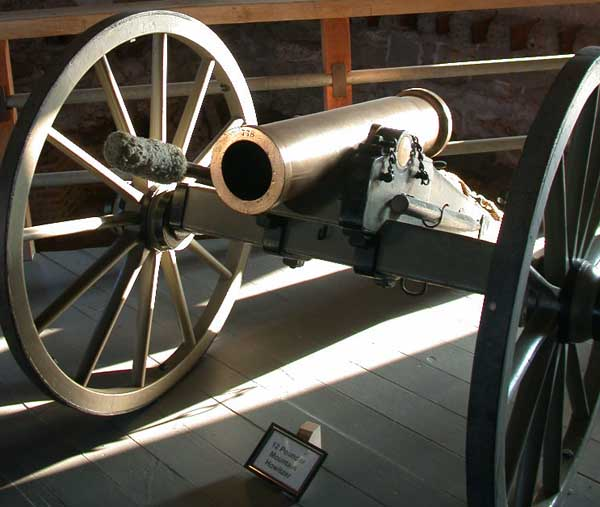
A 12-pounder mountain howitzer on display at Fort Laramie in eastern Wyoming.

The influx of emigrants and settlers into the state led to further encounters with the native people there, and settler military presence along the trails increased; military posts such as Fort Laramie were established. In 1851, representatives from the United States and American Indian nations signed the first Treaty of Fort Laramie in hopes of ensuring peace and the safety of settlers on the trails. While the 1850s were subsequently quiet, tensions rose again after settlers increasingly encroached upon lands promised to the tribes in the region. This was the case after settlers, in 1864, blazed the Bozeman Trail through the hunting grounds of the Powder River Country, which the United States had promised to the tribes in the 1851 treaty. As encounters between settlers and natives grew more serious in 1865, Major General Grenville M. Dodge ordered the first Powder River Expedition to attempt to quell the violence. The expedition ended in the Battle of the Tongue River against the Arapaho. In the following year, the fighting escalated into Red Cloud's War, which was the first major military conflict between the United States and the Wyoming Indian tribes. The second Treaty of Fort Laramie in 1868 ended the war by closing the Powder River Country to whites. Violation of this treaty by miners in the Black Hills led to the Black Hills War in 1876, which was fought mainly along the border of Wyoming and Montana.

== Cattle ==
In 1866, Nelson Story Sr. drove approximately 1000 head of Texas Longhorns to Montana through Wyoming along the Bozeman Trail—the first major cattle drive from Texas into Montana. The Wyoming Stock Growers Association is a historic American cattle organization created in 1873. The Association was started among Wyoming cattle ranchers to standardize and organize the cattle industry, but quickly grew into a political force that has been called "the de facto territorial government" of Wyoming's organization into early statehood, and wielded great influence throughout the Western United States. The association is still active to this day, but it is best known for its rich history and is perhaps most famous for its role in Wyoming's Johnson County War. In 1892 the Johnson County War, also known as the War on Powder River and the Wyoming Range War, took place in Johnson, Natrona and Converse County, Wyoming. It was fought between small settling ranchers against larger established ranchers in the Powder River Country and culminated in a lengthy shootout between local ranchers, a band of hired killers, and a sheriff's posse, eventually requiring the intervention of the United States Cavalry on the orders of President Benjamin Harrison. The events have since become a highly mythologized and symbolic story of the Wild West, and over the years variations of the storyline have come to include some of the west's most famous historical figures and gunslingers. The storyline and its variations have served as the basis for numerous popular novels, films, and television shows.

== Railroad ==
In 1870, roughly three-eights of Wyoming's population was foreign born, coming primarily from Ireland, Germany and England. The Union Pacific Railroad played a central role in the settlement of Wyoming. The land was good for cattle ranches, but without transportation it was too far for a cattle drive. The UP railroad companies had large land grants that were used to back the borrowings from New York and London that financed construction. UP was anxious to locate settlers upon the land as soon as possible, so there would be a steady outflow of cattle, and a steady inflow of manufactured items purchased by the ranchers. UP also built towns that were needed to service the railroad itself, with dining halls for passengers, construction crews, repair shops and housing for train crews. The towns attracted cattle drives and cowboys.

The UP reached the town of Cheyenne, which later became the state capital, in 1867. The railroad eventually spanned the entire state, boosting the population, and creating some of Wyoming's largest cities, such as Laramie, Rock Springs and Evanston. The railroad needed coal, which was discovered in quantity in the southwestern part of the state, especially around Rock Springs. In 1885, a murderous riot known as the Rock Springs Massacre broke out when white miners drove out Chinese miners employed by the Union Pacific Coal Company in Rock Springs.

== Territory and statehood ==
The name "Wyoming" was used by Representative J. M. Ashley of Ohio, who introduced the Ashley Bill to Congress to provide a "temporary government for the territory of Wyoming". The name was made famous by the 1809 poem Gertrude of Wyoming by Thomas Campbell. "Wyoming" is derived from the Delaware (Munsee) name xwé:wamənk, meaning "at the big river flat", originally applied to the Wyoming Valley in Pennsylvania.

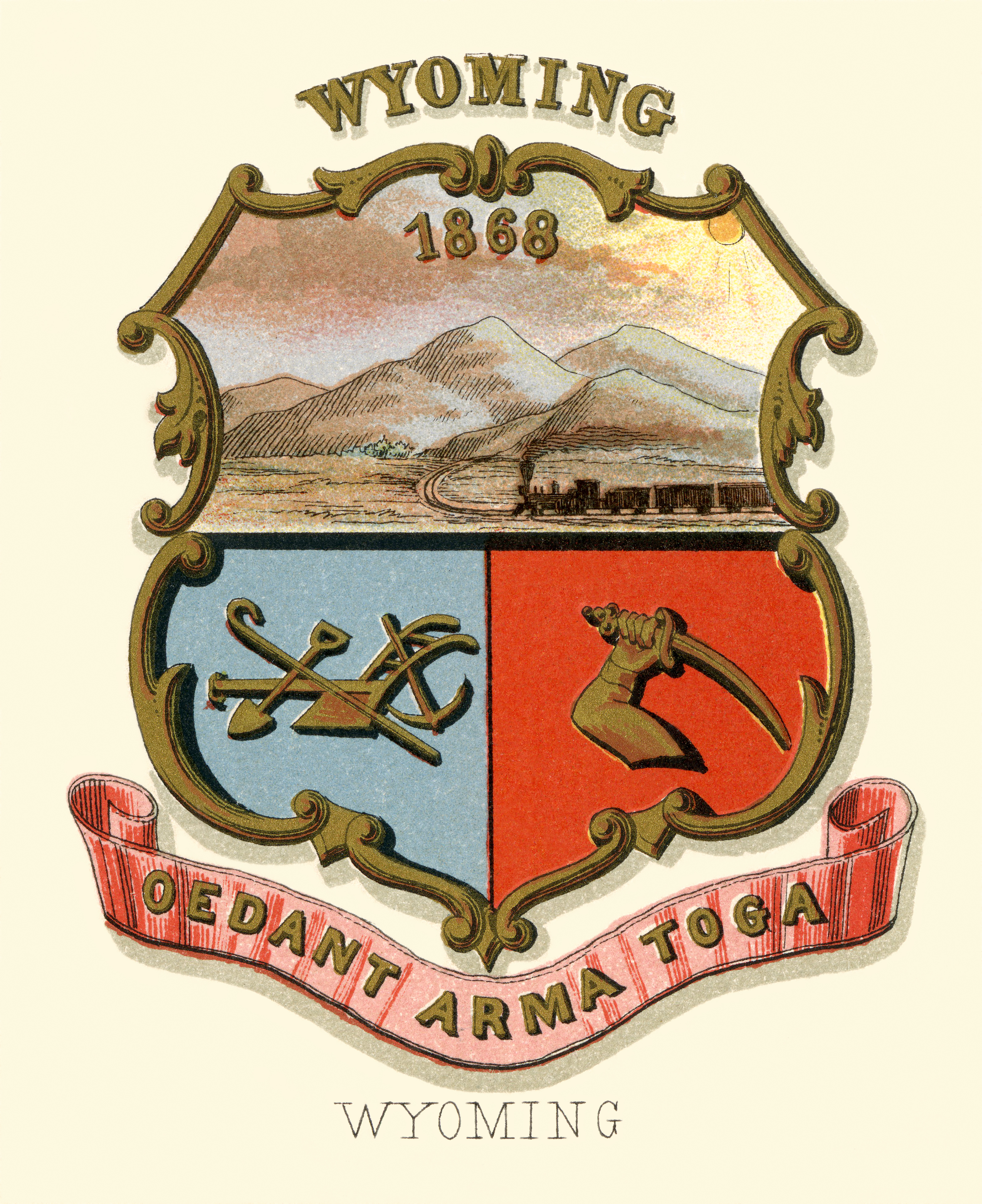
Wyoming territory historical coat of arms (illustrated, 1876). This territorial design was re-adopted at statehood (1890) until a complete redesign in 1893.

After the arrival of the railroad, the population began to grow steadily in the Wyoming Territory, which was established on July 25, 1868. Unlike Colorado to the south, Wyoming never experienced a rapid population boom in the 19th century from any major mineral discoveries such as gold or silver.

Inclusion of women's suffrage in the Wyoming constitution was debated in the constitutional convention, but ultimately accepted. The constitution was mostly borrowed from those of other states, but also included an article making all the water in Wyoming property of the state. Wyoming overcame the obstacles of low population and of being the only territory in the U.S. giving women the right to vote, and the United States admitted Wyoming into the Union as the 44th state on July 10, 1890.

== Suffrage ==
On December 10, 1869, Wyoming Territory granted women the right to vote, becoming the first future U.S. state to extend suffrage to women. Wyoming was also the home of many other firsts for U.S. women in politics. The first time women served on a jury was in Wyoming (Laramie in 1870). Wyoming had the first female court bailiff (Mary Atkinson, Laramie, in 1870), and the country's first female justice of the peace (Esther Hobart Morris, South Pass City, in 1870). Wyoming became the first state in the Union to elect a female governor, Nellie Tayloe Ross, who was elected in 1924 and took office in January 1925.

== Yellowstone National Park ==
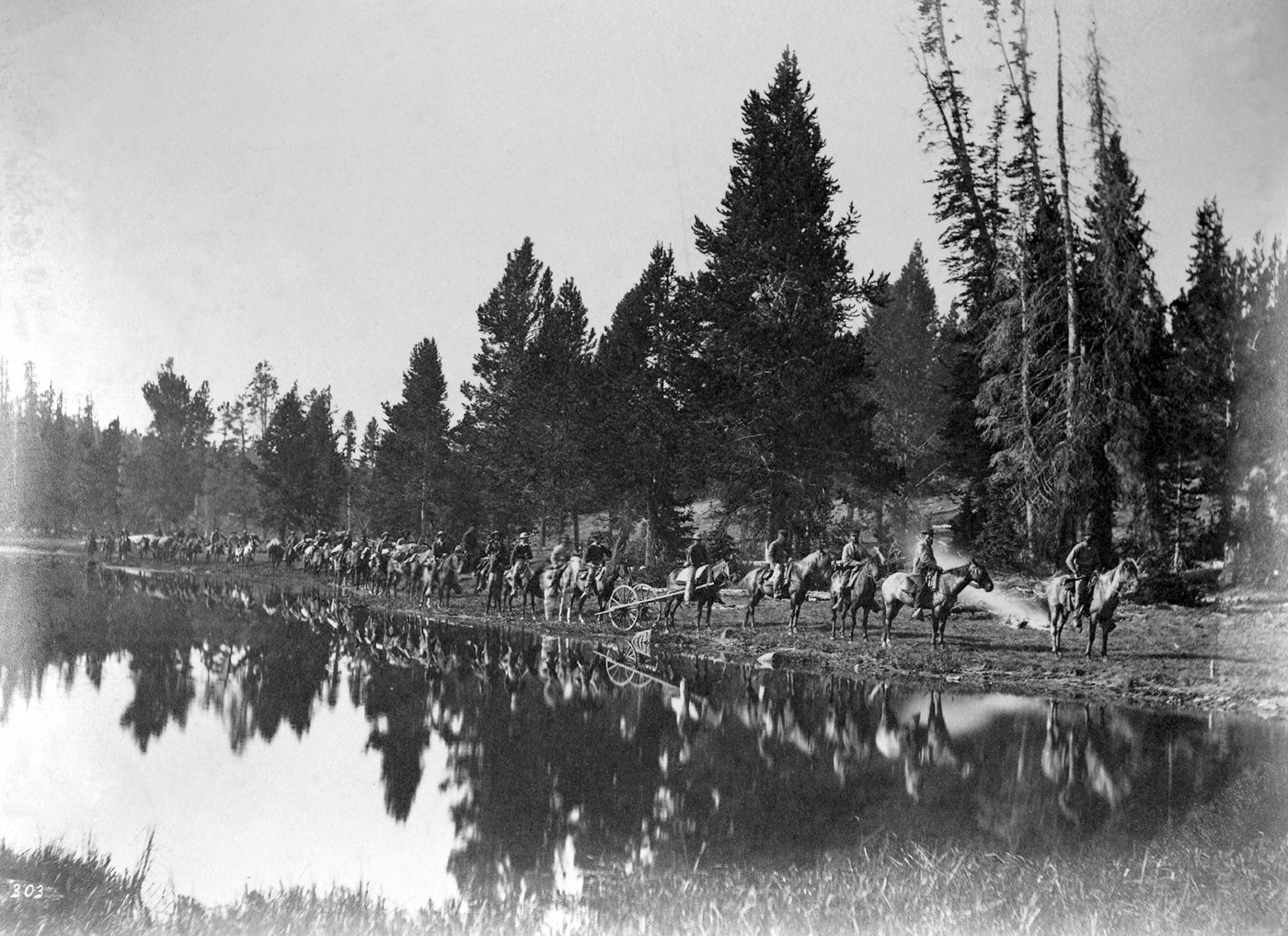
The Hayden expedition in Wyoming as photographed by William Henry Jackson

Following on the reports of men like Colter and Bridger, a number of organized expeditions were undertaken in northwestern Wyoming. The Cook–Folsom–Peterson Expedition in 1869 and the Washburn-Langford-Doane Expedition in 1870 confirmed the stories of the mountain men. In 1871, Ferdinand Vandeveer Hayden led a formal geological survey of the area, the result of which ultimately convinced Congress to set aside the region. Yellowstone National Park became the world's first National Park in 1872. In August 1886, the U.S. Army was given administration of the park. In 1917, administration of the park was transferred to the new National Park Service. Hundreds of structures have been built and are protected for their architectural and historical significance, and researchers have examined more than 1,000 archaeological sites. Most of Yellowstone National Park is located in Wyoming.

Wyoming is also home to the nation's first national monument (Devils Tower created in 1906), and the first national forest (Shoshone National Forest created in 1891).

== Settlers ==
The Homestead Act of 1862 attracted many new farmers and ranchers to Wyoming, where they congregated along the fertile banks of the rivers. Most of the land in Wyoming in the 2nd half of the 19th century was in the public domain and so was open for both homesteading and open range for grazing cattle. As individual ranchers moved into the state, they became at odds with the larger ranches for control of the range and water sources. Tensions rose to a boiling point in April 1892 as an armed conflict known as the Johnson County War, fought between the large cattle operators and smaller ranchers and homesteaders. The increased number of settlers also brought with them merchants, as well as outlaws. A number of notable outlaws of the time started their careers in Wyoming, including Butch Cassidy and Harry Longabaugh, both of whom were incarcerated in Wyoming as young men. A remote area in Johnson County, Wyoming known as the Hole-in-the-Wall was a well known hideout for a loose association of outlaw gangs known as the Hole in the Wall Gang. It was used from the 1860s through the early 20th century by outlaws operating throughout Wyoming.

== Mining ==
Precious metals were never discovered in great quantities, though a small amount of gold was discovered near South Pass prompting a small rush in the 1860s. Coal was discovered early and has been mined extensively through the state. Union Pacific Railroad ran several coal mines in the southern part of the state to supply the railroad. In 1885 tensions at a Union Pacific mine in Rock Springs resulted in the Rock Springs massacre, one of the largest race riots in U.S. history. Oil is also plentiful throughout the state. In 1924, irregularities over the allocation of naval reserves near Casper resulted in the Teapot Dome Scandal. Natural gas, bentonite and uranium have also been mined through the state's history.

One exception is the copper mines in Carbon County west of Encampment. The Ferris-Haggarty Mine Site supplied copper for the electrification of the world in the late 1800s and early 1900s.

== Historical memory ==
After 1890, Wyoming pageants and parades, as well as school courses, increasingly told a nostalgic story of Wyoming as rooted in the frontier West. During the 1940s, Wyoming millionaire William R. Coe made large contributions to the American studies programs at Yale University and at the University of Wyoming. Coe wished to celebrate the values of the Western United States in order to meet the threat of communism.

== See also ==
History of Wyoming

- Wyoming Territory
- Bibliography of Wyoming history
- Emigrant Trail in Wyoming
- List of counties in Wyoming
- List of ghost towns in Wyoming
- List of governors of Wyoming
- List of municipalities in Wyoming
- Outline of Wyoming
- Outline of Wyoming territorial evolution
  - Territory of Wyoming
  - State of Wyoming
- Timeline of Wyoming history
  - Timeline of Cheyenne, Wyoming
