= Hanna Mine disasters =

Two coal mine explosions in Wyoming

Coordinates: 41°51′58″N 106°32′39″W

Two separate explosions in 1903 and 1908 at Hanna Mines, coal mines located in Carbon County, Wyoming, United States, caused a total of over 200 fatalities. The 1903 incident was Wyoming's worst coal mining disaster.

== Background ==
In 1889, Union Pacific Railroad needed a reliable fuel source to run its progressively larger coal-fired steam locomotives. After the coal mines in Carbon, Wyoming ran out, it hastily formed the Union Pacific Coal Company and opened a mine at Chimney Springs.

Chimney Springs was renamed Hanna in honor of Marcus A. Hanna, a member of Union Pacific Company management and an Ohio United States Senator. Hanna, Wyoming was formed as a company town for the Union Pacific Coal Company. As such, the Union Pacific owned everything in it, including the boarding house, the general store and the miners' houses that were rented to them by the month. Hanna was a major hub of the emerging transportation industry of the day with the Union Pacific Railroad and the Overland Trail passing through.

== 1903 disaster ==
In 1903, coal was mined by dynamite and the backs of men loading it into donkey-drawn carts. Men worked long hours in the dark, faces covered in black dust.

The disaster at the Union Pacific Coal Company Hanna mine #1 occurred on June 30, 1903. Coal mine gas (methane) was ignited in Mine No. 1 causing a violent explosion and a mine cave-in, killing 169 miners, while 46 survivors narrowly escaped this disaster. Many bodies, recovered over the next year, are buried in the nearby Hanna Cemetery. This tragedy was the greatest loss of life in any Wyoming mining disaster. The mine's bosses blamed the accident on a careless miner and, because of a coal strike in Colorado, Union Pacific Coal Company reopened mine #1 a few months later.

== 1908 disaster ==
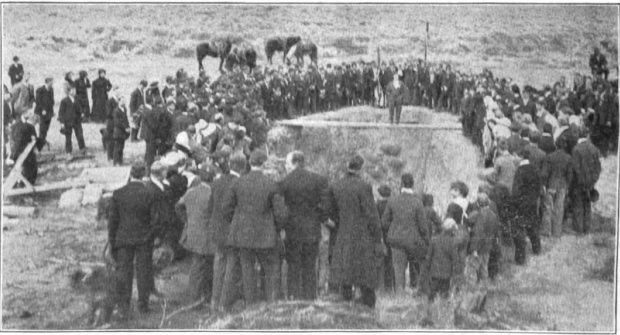
Memorial services held at Mine No. 1 on March 28, 1910

On March 28, 1908 the Hanna Mine #1 exploded again, trapping 18 miners. As the state mine inspector and 40 rescuers entered the mine, a second explosion occurred and killed all 59 inside. Recovery teams eventually removed 27 bodies, but another 32 were left in the mountain. With the 1903 blast leaving 169 men dead in the mine, 201 men are still buried there today.

After the 1908 blast, the Wyoming state inspector blamed Union Pacific Coal Company's method of mining for the disaster. It was called "gouging", a system in which coal is mined immediately after the mine is opened, because it yields coal more quickly at the start of the operation. Gouging allows methane gas to gather in rooms already mined while miners are digging for coal deeper in the mountain. Had Union Pacific dug deep into the mountain first and mined the coal on their way back toward the surface, they would have been able to flood mined rooms with water. This would have prevented the buildup of methane gas, and saved many lives.

The 1908 double explosions left 31 widows and orphaned 103 children. In settlements with Union Pacific Coal Company, each widow who lived in Hanna got $800 plus $50 for each child. Widows who returned to their homelands abroad got $350. The settlement barred any future claims against the company.

== Closing of the mines ==
In the five-year period from 1903 through 1908, 228 had died in these two mine disasters in mine #1 before the creation of safety teams, safety laws or even the implementation of safety inspections. Just weeks before each blast, company mine inspectors gave Mine #1 glowing safety reviews.

After 1908, the Union Pacific Coal Company permanently closed Mine #1. The Union Pacific Coal Company opened new mines in Hanna, hiring new miners.

All of the Hanna mines closed in 1954 due to the Union Pacific Railroad's switching over to Diesel locomotives. Green grass now covers most of the hill that was once the entrance to Mine #1. This mine is now but a tomb marked with a now rusty ribbon of an abandoned railroad line. Numerous reclamation projects to protect the overlying community from mine subsidence related issues have been performed by the Wyoming Department of Environmental Quality's Abandoned Mine Land Division since the 1980s.

== Memorial ==
A memorial to miners killed in Hanna and Carbon County is located at Hanna Junction, northeast of highway US30, in a site difficult to access.
