= Outline of Wyoming territorial evolution =

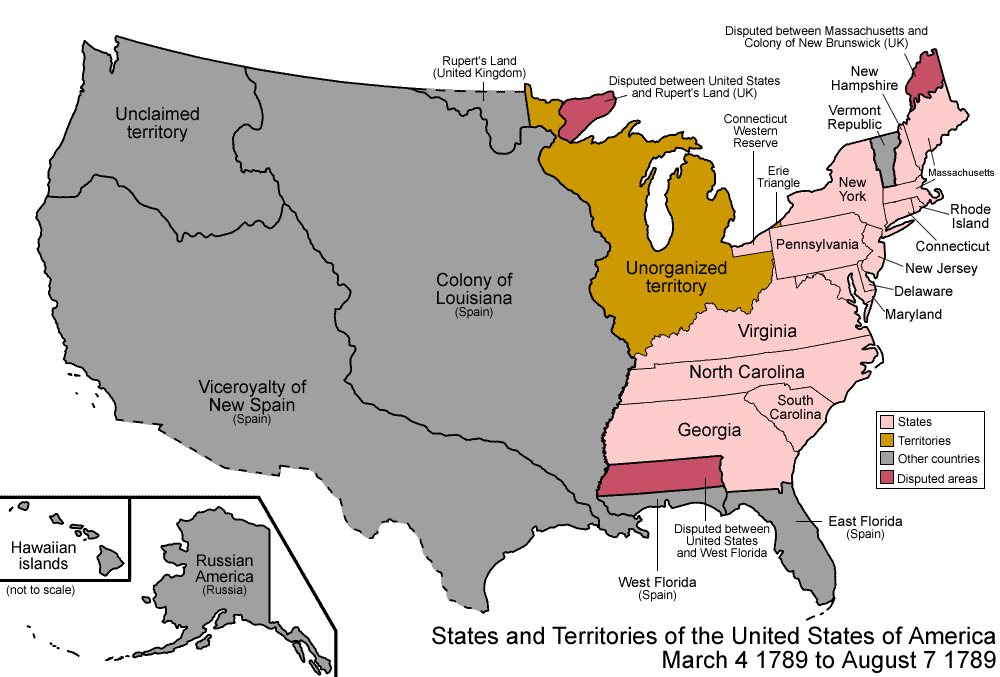
An enlargeable map of the United States after the Constitution of the United States was ratified on March 4, 1789.

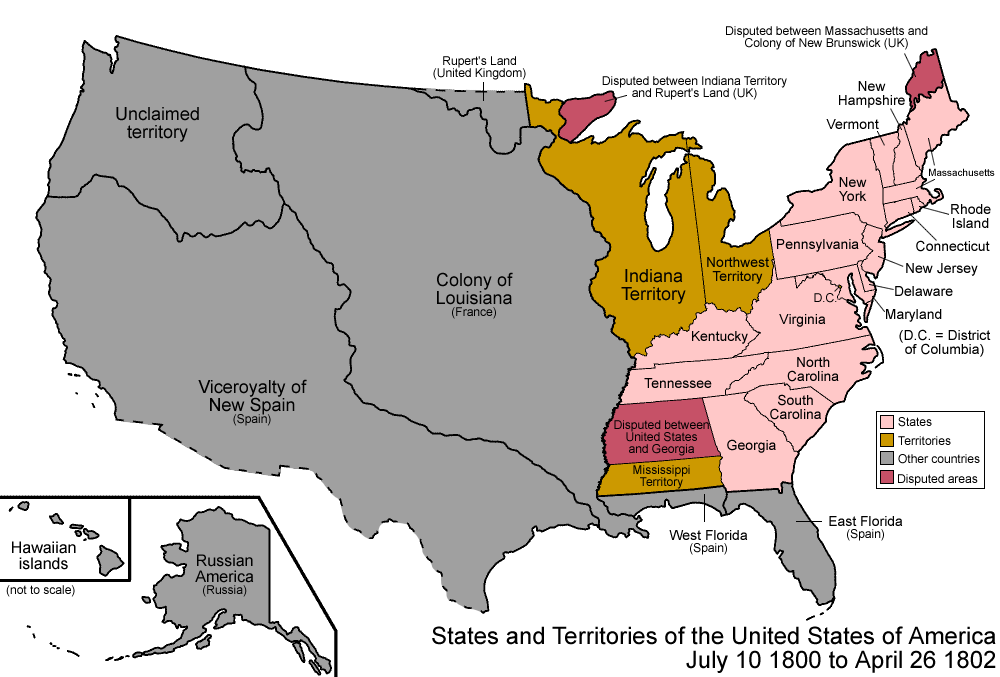
An enlargeable map of the United States after the secret Third Treaty of San Ildefonso transferred the Spanish colony of la Luisiana to the French Republic on October 1, 1800.

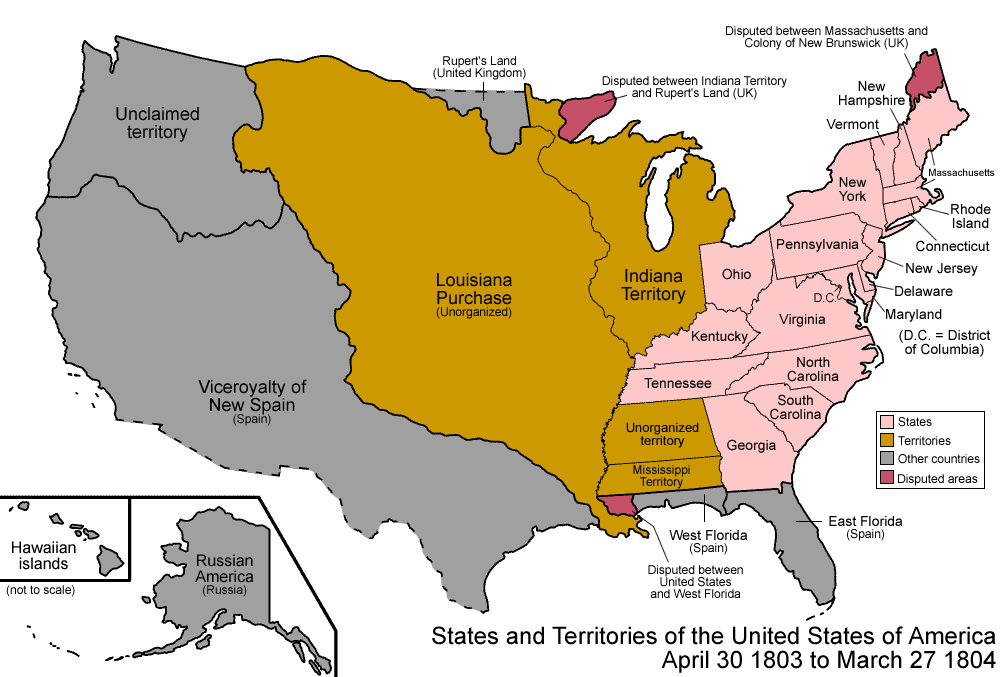
An enlargeable map of the United States after the Louisiana Purchase took effect on December 20, 1803.

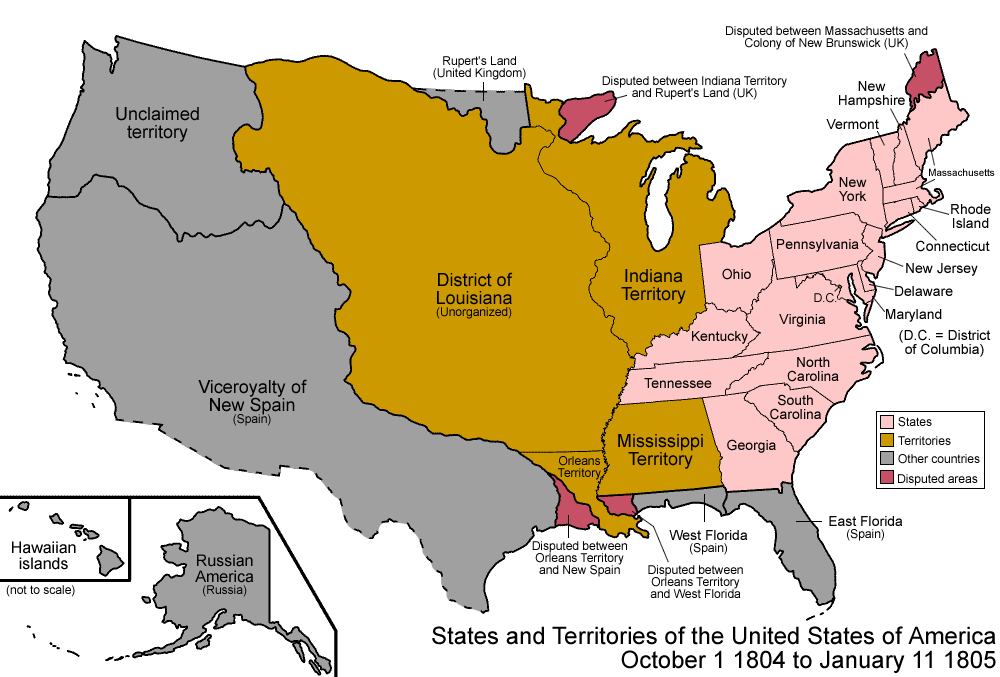
An enlargeable map of the United States after the creation of the District of Louisiana on March 26, 1804.

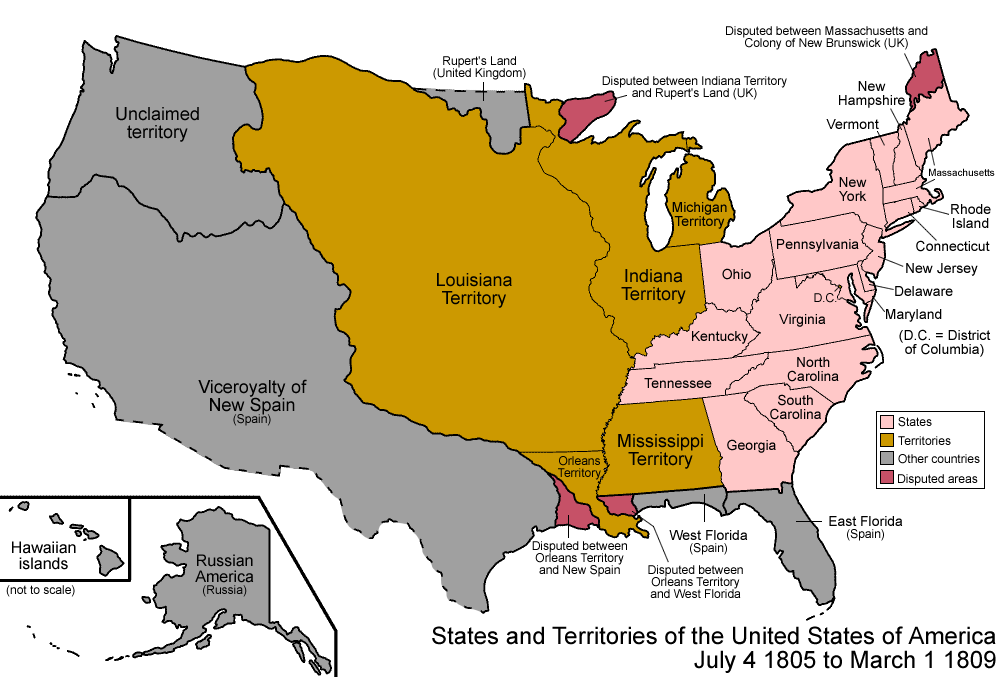
An enlargeable map of the United States after the creation of the Territory of Louisiana on March 3, 1805.

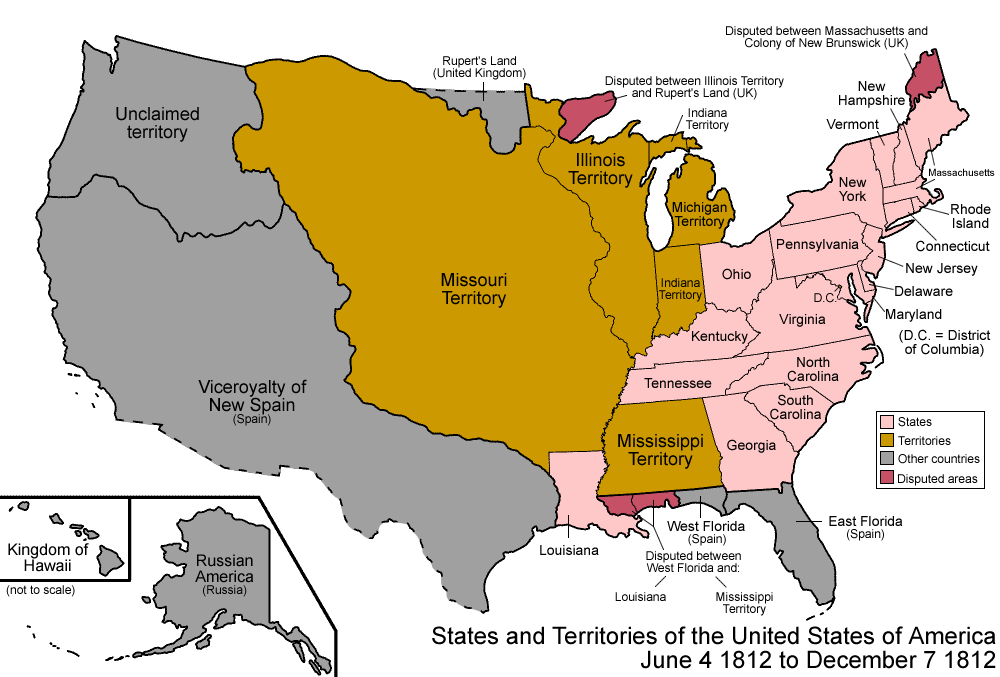
An enlargeable map of the United States after the creation of the Territory of Missouri on June 4, 1812.

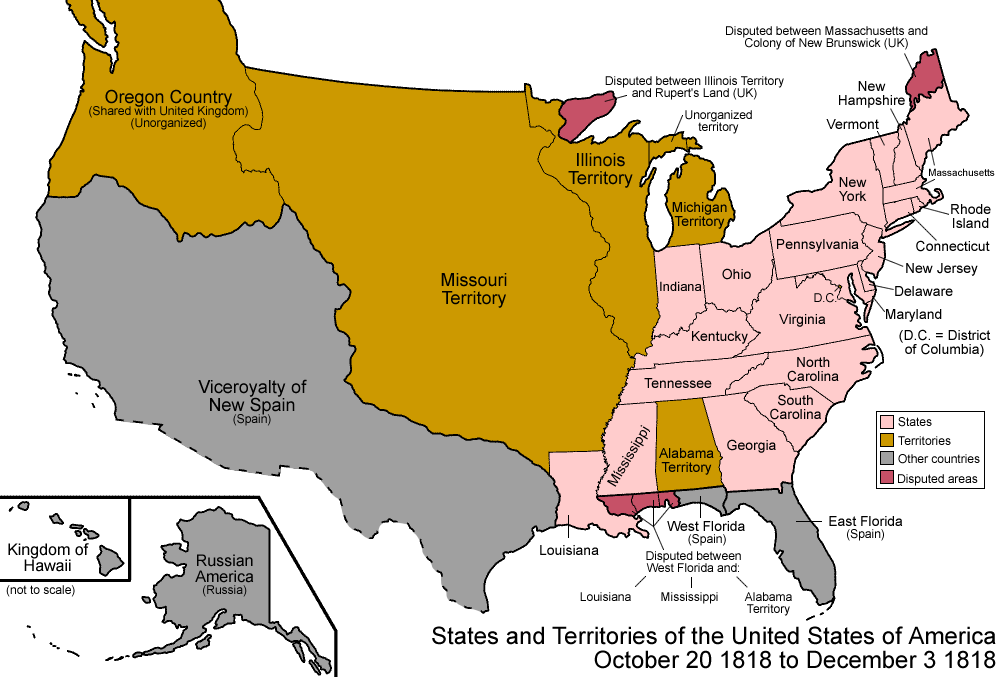
An enlargeable map of the United States after the Treaty of 1818 took effect on October 20, 1818.

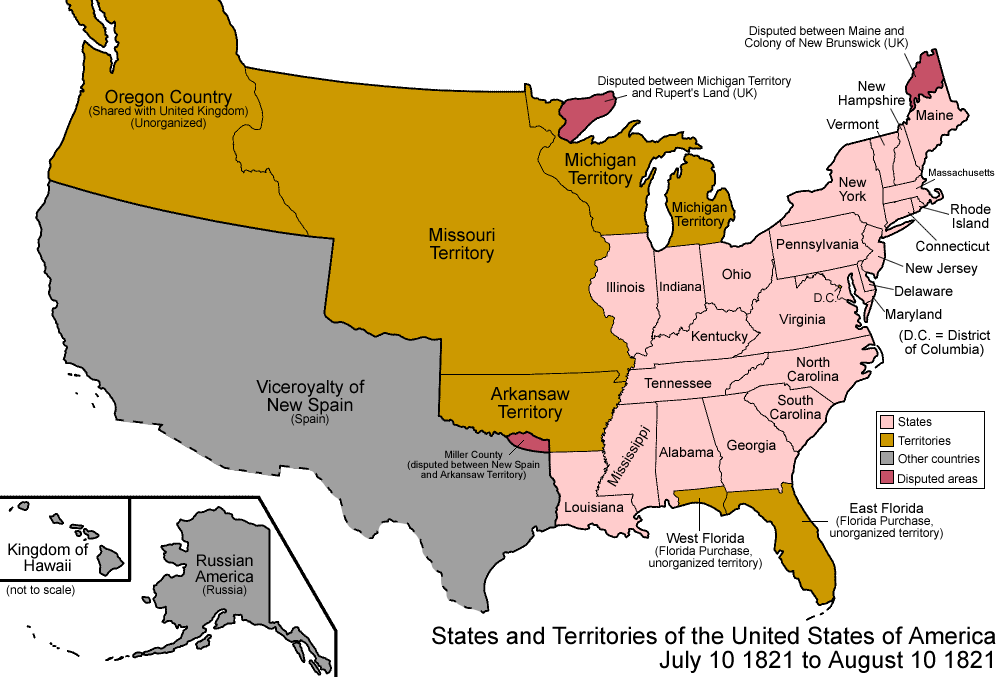
An enlargeable map of the United States after the Adams–Onís Treaty took effect on February 22, 1821.

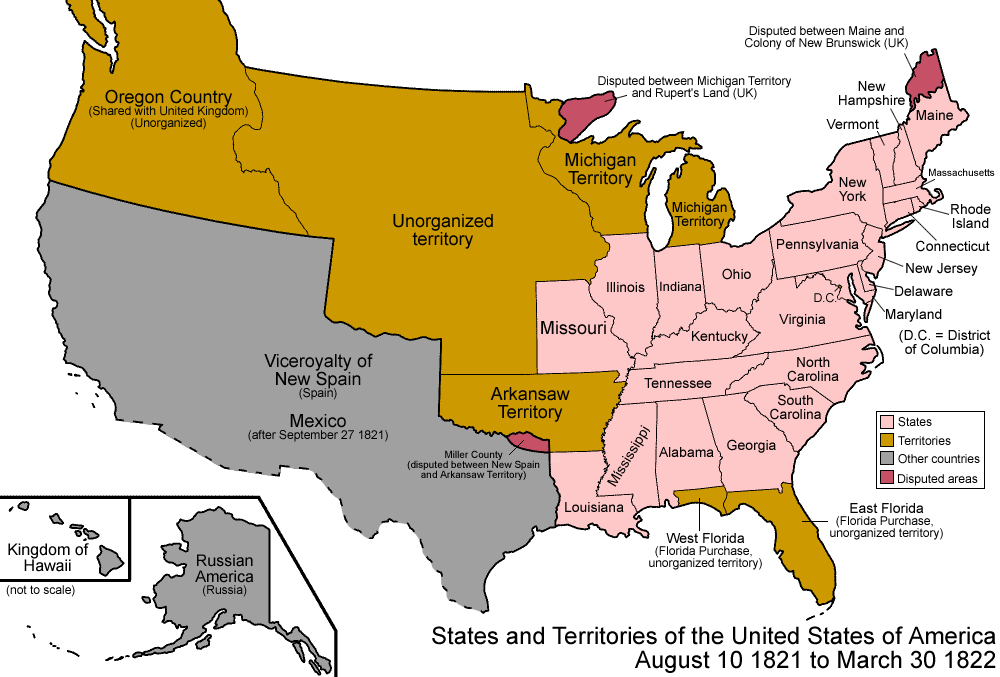
An enlargeable map of the United States after Missouri was admitted to the Union on August 10, 1821.

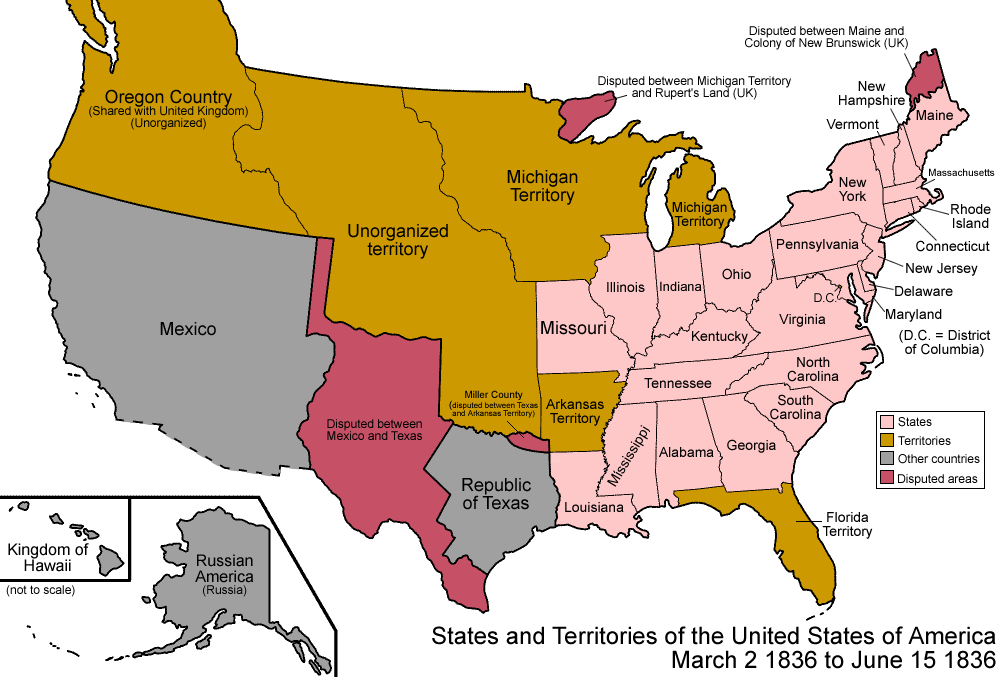
Territorial claims of the Republic of Texas, May 2, 1836.

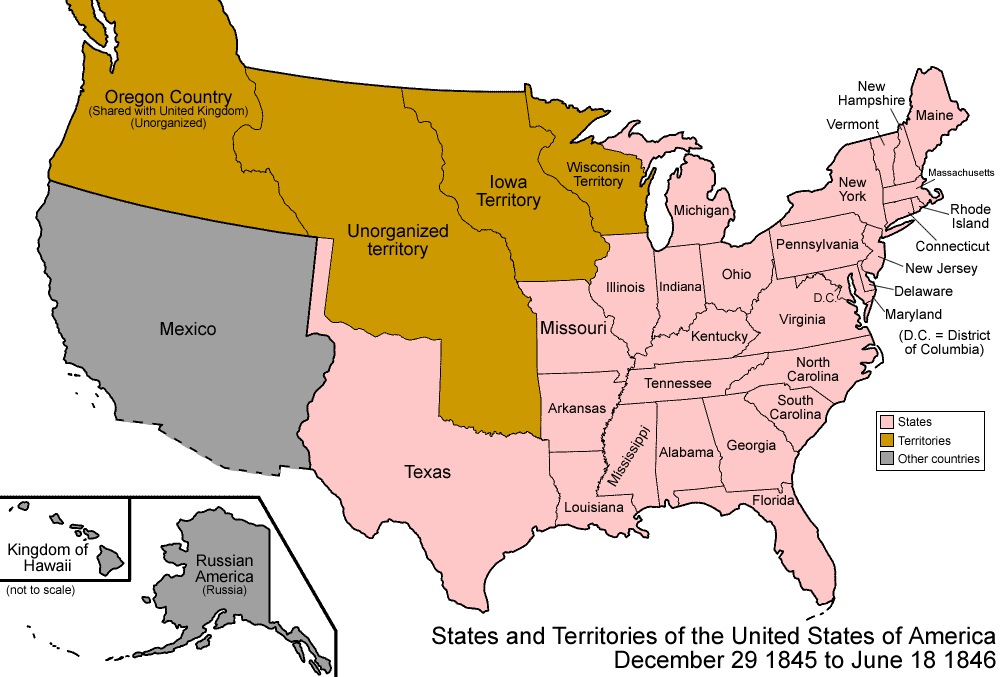
An enlargeable map of the United States after Texas was admitted to the Union on December 29, 1845.

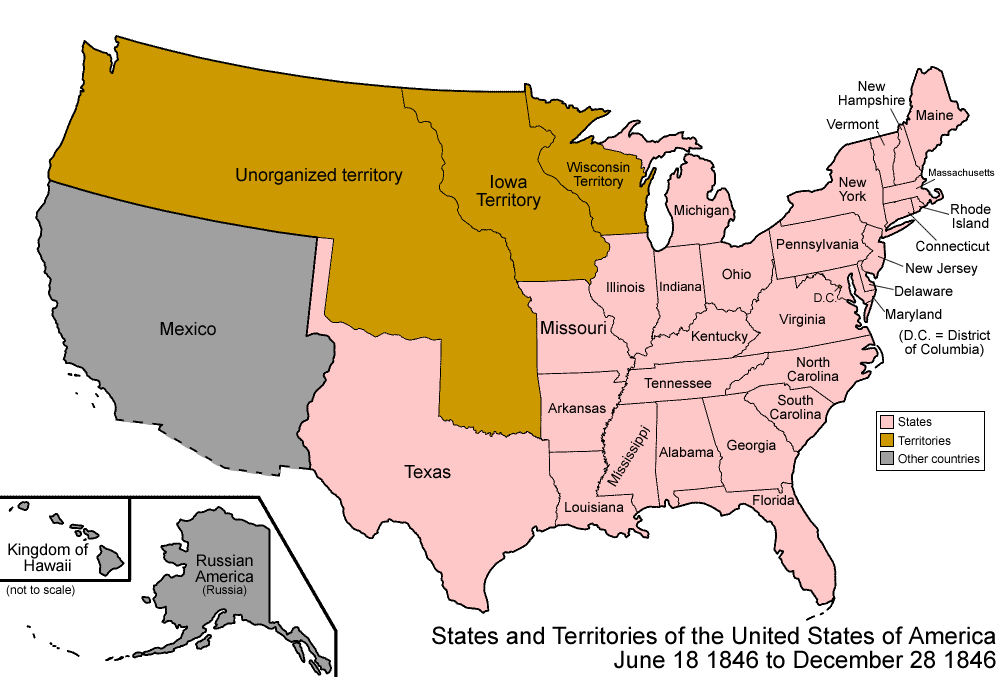
An enlargeable map of the United States after the Oregon Treaty took effect July 17, 1846

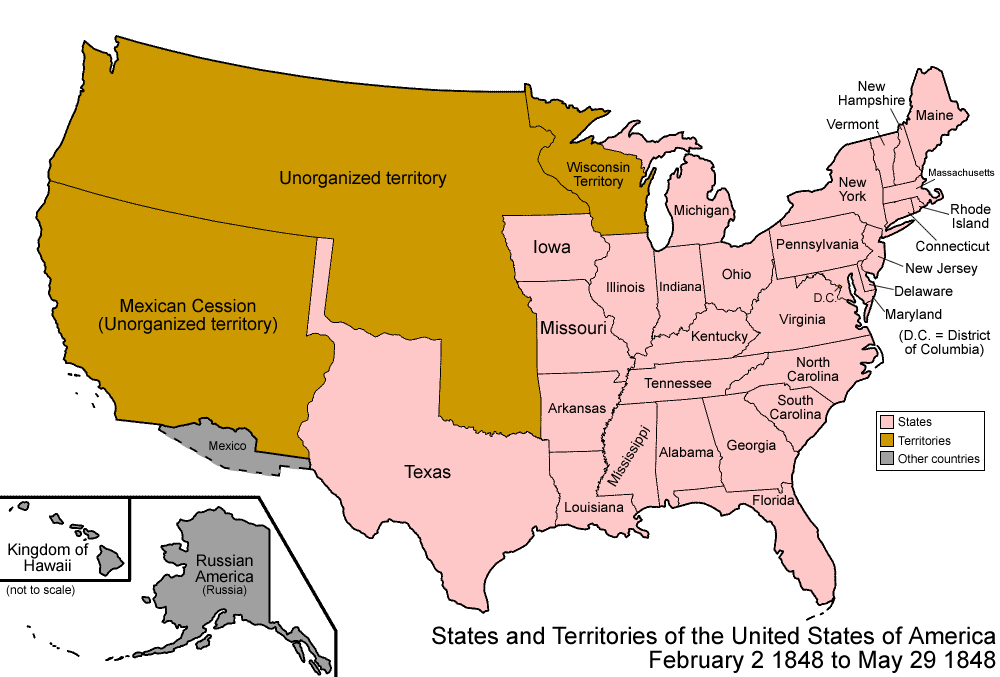
An enlargeable map of the United States after the Treaty of Guadalupe Hidalgo was signed on February 2, 1848.

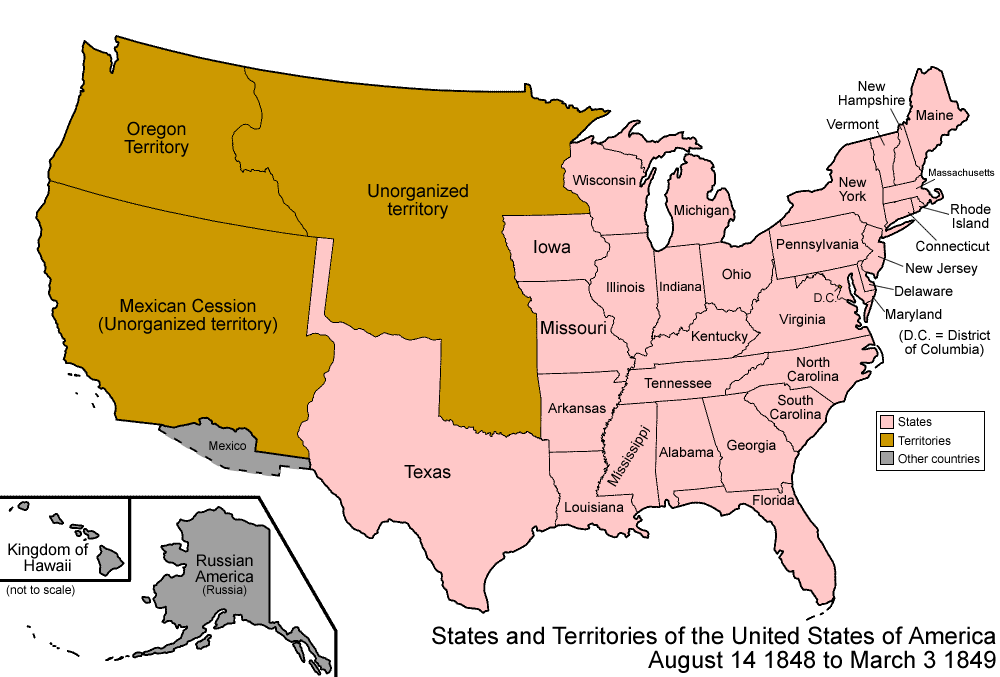
An enlargeable map of the United States after the creation of the Territory of Oregon on August 14, 1848.

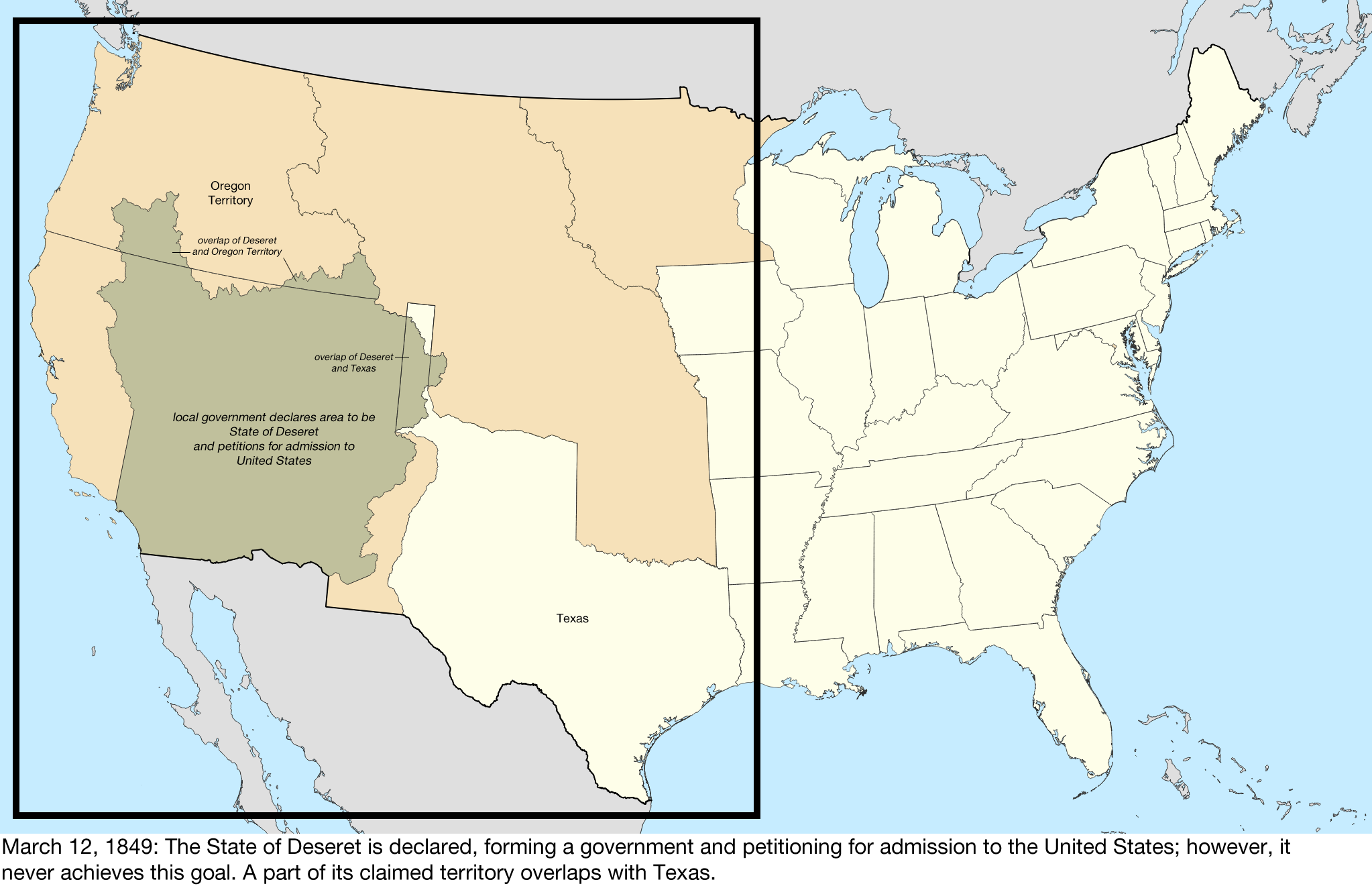
An enlargeable map of the United States after the creation of the proposed State of Deseret on July 2, 1849.

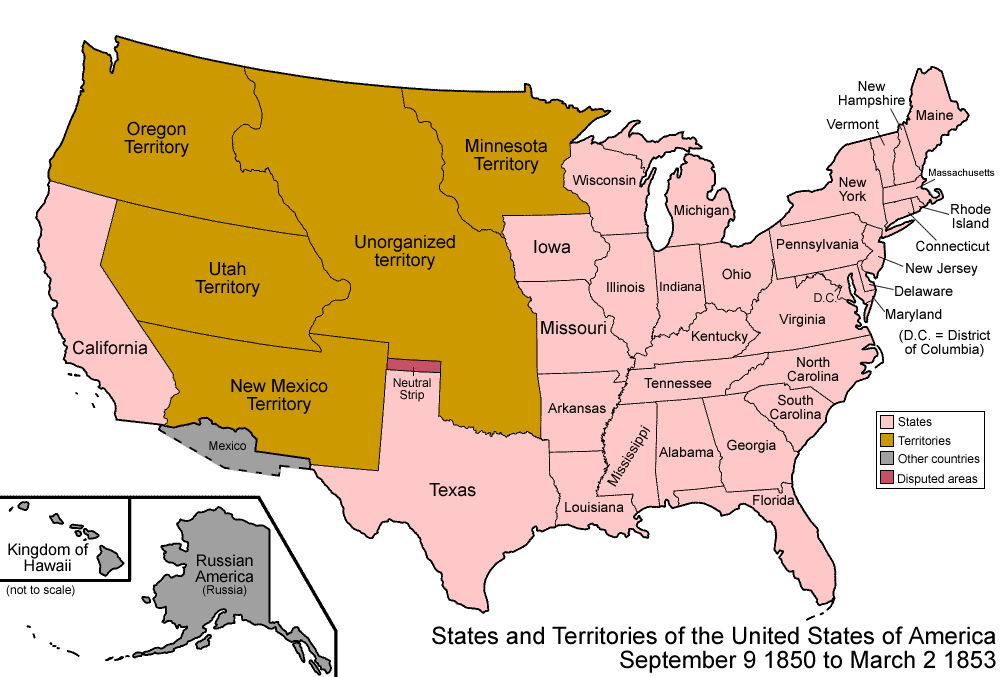
An enlargeable map of the United States after the creation of the Territory of New Mexico and the Territory of Utah on September 9, 1850.

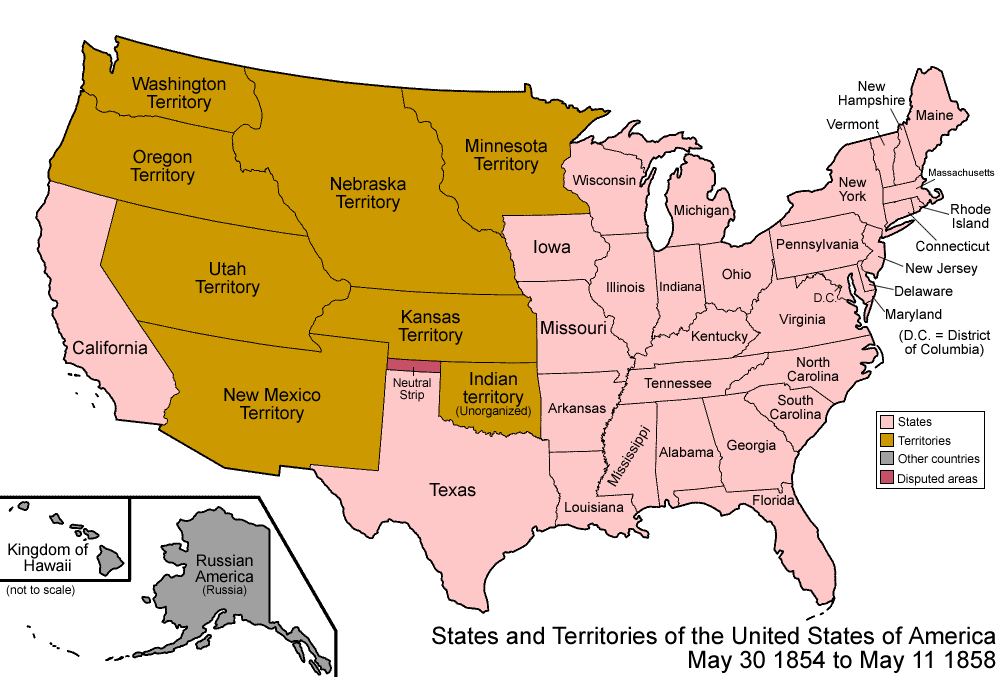
An enlargeable map of the United States after the creation of the Territory of Kansas and the Territory of Nebraska on May 30, 1854.

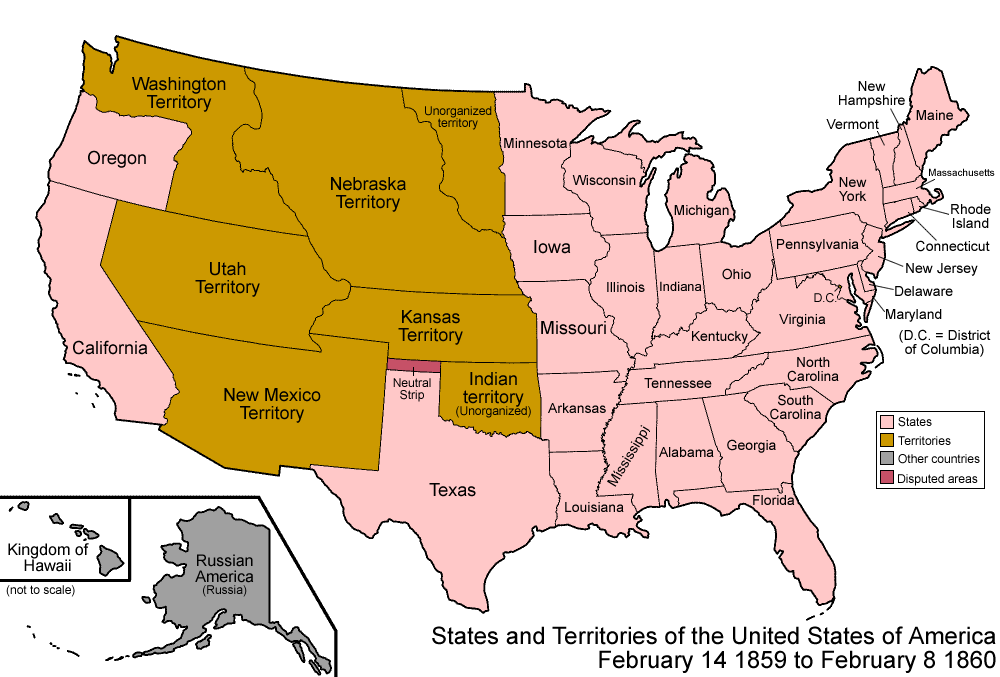
An enlargeable map of the United States after the admission of Oregon to the Union on February 14, 1859.

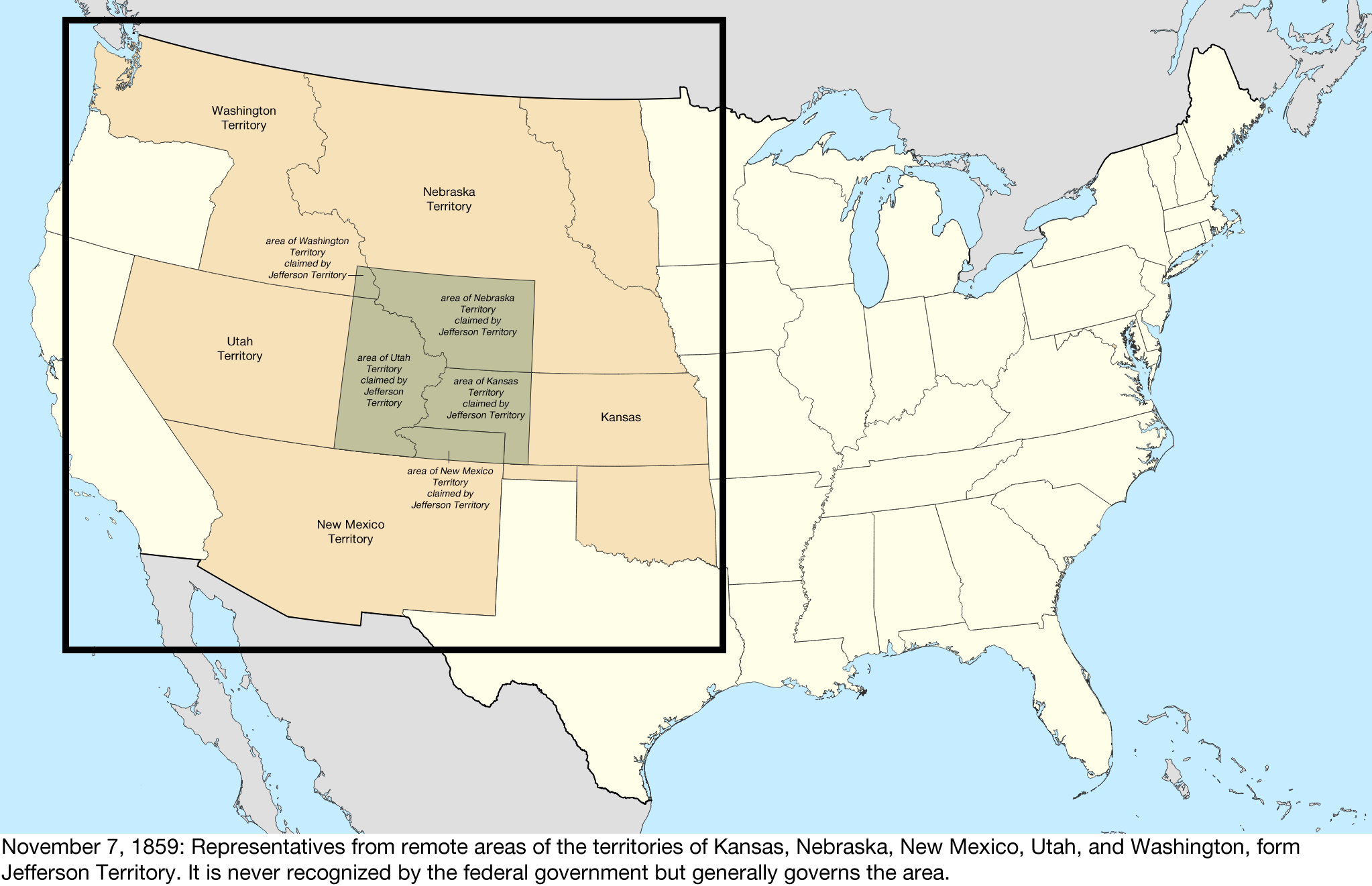
An enlargeable map of the United States after the creation of the proposed Territory of Jefferson on October 24, 1859.

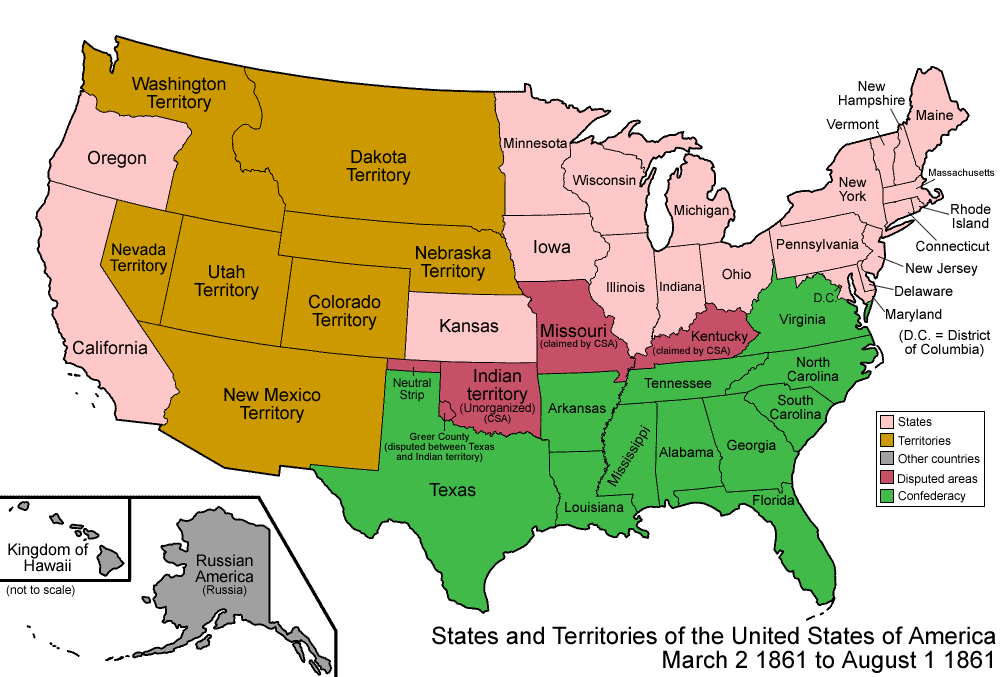
An enlargeable map of the United States after the creation of the Territory of Dakota on March 2, 1861.

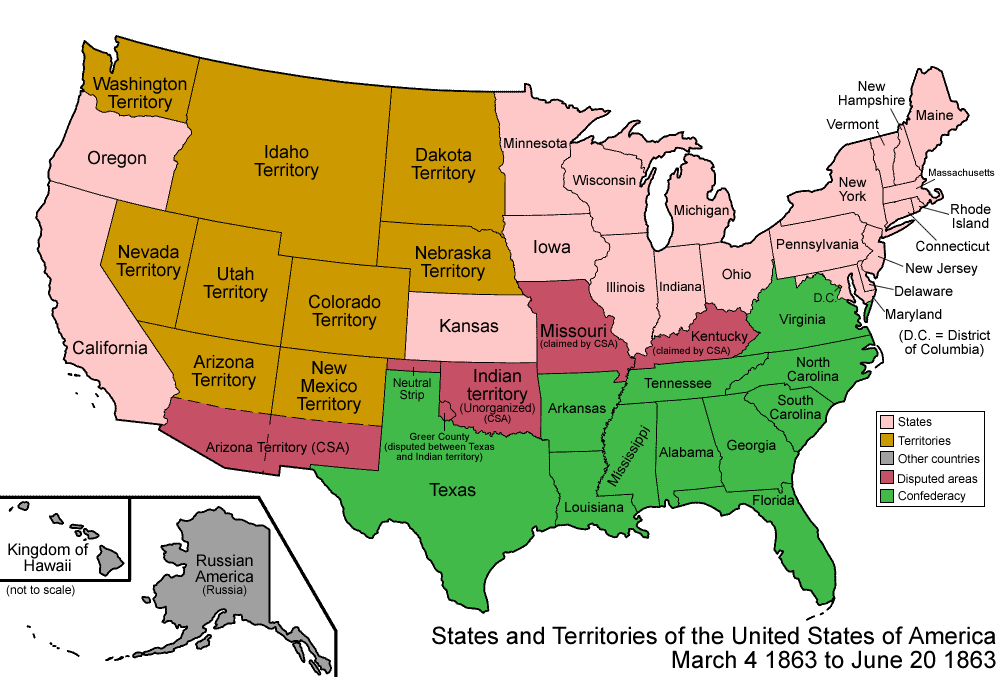
An enlargeable map of the United States after the creation of the Territory of Idaho on March 3, 1863.

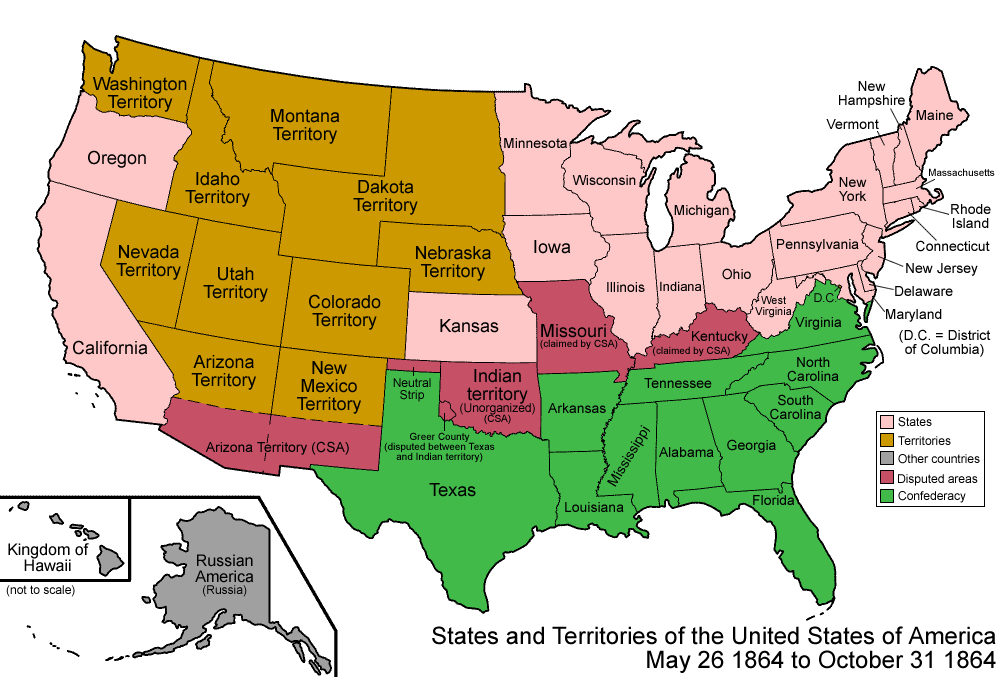
An enlargeable map of the United States after the creation of the Territory of Montana on May 26, 1864.

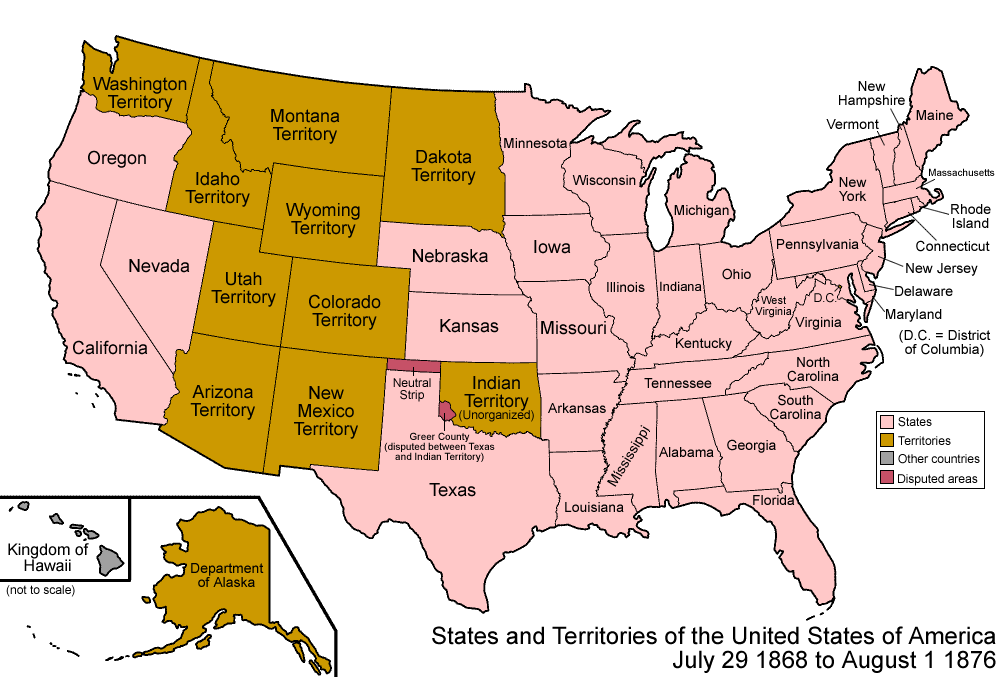
An enlargeable map of the United States after the creation of the Territory of Wyoming on July 25, 1868.

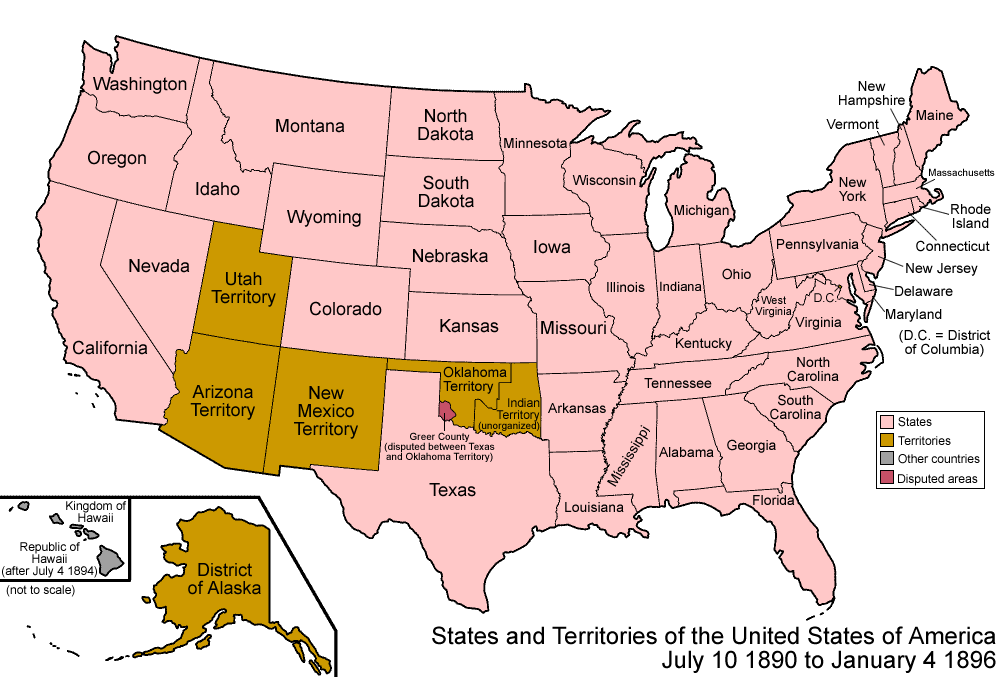
An enlargeable map of the United States after the admission of Wyoming to the Union on July 10, 1890.

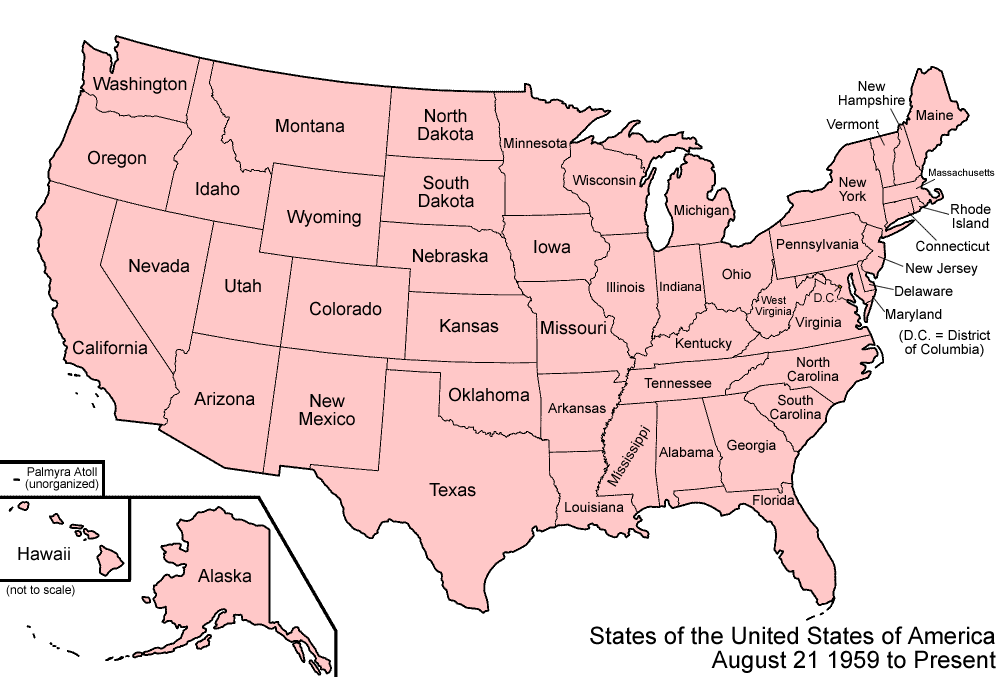
An enlargeable map of the United States as it has been since Hawaiʻi was admitted to the Union on August 21, 1959.

The following outline traces the territorial evolution of the U.S. State of Wyoming.

== Outline ==
- Historical territorial claims of Spain in the present State of Wyoming:
  - Nueva Vizcaya, 1562–1821
  - Santa Fé de Nuevo Méjico, 1598–1821
  - Gran Cuenca, 1776–1821
    - Treaty of Córdoba of 1821
- Historical territorial claims of France in the present State of Wyoming:
  - Louisiane, 1682–1764
    - Treaty of Fontainebleau of 1762
- Historical territorial claims of Spain in the present State of Wyoming:
  - Luisiana, 1764–1803
    - Third Treaty of San Ildefonso of 1800
- Historical territorial claims of France in the present State of Wyoming:
  - Louisiane, 1803
    - Vente de la Louisiane of 1803
- Historical international territory in the present State of Wyoming:
  - Oregon Country, 1818–1846
    - Provisional Government of Oregon (extralegal), 1843–1849
    - Oregon Treaty of 1846
- Historical territorial claims of Mexico in the present State of Wyoming:
  - Santa Fé de Nuevo México, 1821–1848
  - Gran Cuenca, 1821–1848
    - Treaty of Guadalupe Hidalgo of 1848
- Historical territorial claims of the Republic of Texas in the present State of Wyoming:
  - Disputed strip north from the headwaters of the Arkansas River and the Rio Grande, 1836–1845
    - Texas Annexation of 1845
- Historical political divisions of the United States in the present State of Wyoming:
  - Unorganized territory created by the Louisiana Purchase, 1803–1804
  - District of Louisiana, 1804–1805
  - Territory of Louisiana, 1805–1812
  - Territory of Missouri, 1812–1821
    - Adams-Onís Treaty of 1819
  - Unorganized territory previously the western portion of the Missouri Territory, 1821–1854
  - Disputed territory created by the Texas Annexation, 1845–1850
    - Compromise of 1850
  - Unorganized territory created by the Oregon Treaty, 1846–1848
  - Unorganized territory created by the Treaty of Guadalupe Hidalgo, 1848–1850
  - Territory of Oregon, 1848–1859
  - State of Deseret (extralegal), 1849–1850
  - Territory of Utah, 1850–1896
  - Territory of Nebraska, 1854–1867
  - Territory of Washington, 1853–1889
  - Territory of Jefferson (extralegal), 1859–1861
  - Territory of Dakota, 1861–1889
  - Territory of Idaho, 1863–1890
  - Territory of Wyoming, 1868-1890
  - State of Wyoming since 1890

== See also ==
- History of Wyoming
  - Timeline of Wyoming history
- Native Americans in the United States
- Territorial evolution of the United States

(Spain) Nueva España
(New France) La Louisiane
(Spain) La Luisiana
(United States) Louisiana Purchase
(United States) District of Louisiana
(Missouri) Louisiana Territory
Missouri Territory
(Mexico) Mexican Empire
Republic of Texas
Oregon Territory
Utah Territory
(Washington (state)) Washington Territory
Nebraska Territory
(South Dakota) Dakota Territory
Idaho Territory
Wyoming Territory
State of Wyoming
