= Shoshone Cavern National Monument =

National monument in Wyoming, United States

Coordinates: 44°30′6″N 109°8′48″W

Shoshone Cavern National Monument was proclaimed by William Howard Taft on September 21, 1909. On March 17, 1954, the 83rd Congress abolished the monument and transferred the 210 acres (0.85 km^{2}) site to the city of Cody, Wyoming. The cavern is located high up near the summit of Cedar Mountain, about 4 miles from Cody on the south side of the Shoshone River. The main cavern follows a fairly straight course, extending into the mountain about 2,500 feet (760 m). The walls of the cavern are well covered by incrustations of crystals and dripping formations, mostly white, but some brownish or reddish in color. As of 2008, the cavern is owned by the federal government on land administered by the Bureau of Land Management and is now called Spirit Mountain Cave. A permit is required to visit Spirit Mountain Cave. To obtain permits to visit the cave contact Bureau of Land Management office in the Cody WY.
