= 27th meridian west from Washington =

Former survey line

Coordinates: 0°0′0″N 104°3′5.194″W

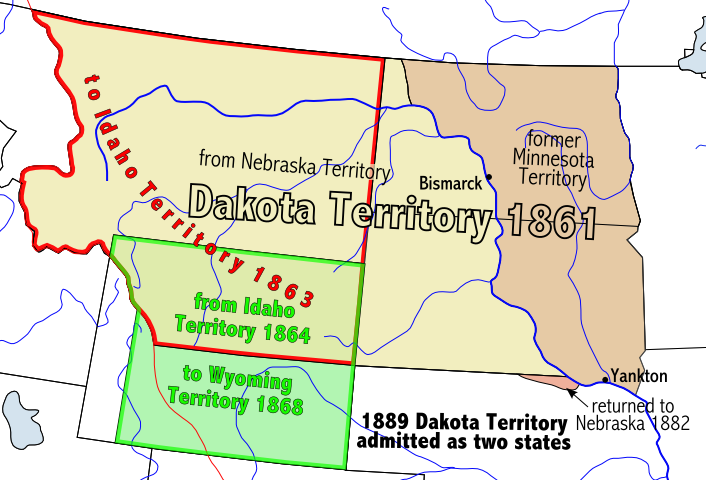
Territorial evolution of the states on the boundary

The 27th meridian west from Washington is an archaic meridian based on the Washington Meridian. The meridian is approximately 104 degrees west of the Prime Meridian. It is used as the boundary of five states of the United States.

== History ==
After the completion of the first transcontinental railroad in the United States on May 10, 1869, Robert R. Livingston, the Iowa and Nebraska Surveyor General, on May 29, 1869, hired Oliver N. Chaffee, a surveyor and astronomer from Detroit, Michigan, to survey the 25th and 27th meridians west of Washington, D.C. Chaffee traveled to the eastern terminus of the Union Pacific Railroad at Omaha, Nebraska, where he met with the newly established astronomical station built by the United States Coast Survey. From there, he went to Bushnell, Nebraska, where he took astronomical readings for two days to coordinate with Omaha. Chaffee then placed a second astronomical station in Julesburg, Colorado, and traveled east to connect the 25th and 27th meridians with the 41st parallel, which formed the boundaries or corners of five western states.

== Usage as boundary ==
The use of the meridian as a boundary began in 1863 when the Idaho Territory was created, with the 27th meridian as its eastern boundary. At that time, the Dakota Territory and the Nebraska Territory gained their western boundary as portions of those territories were made a part of Idaho Territory. Nebraska became a state in 1867. In 1868, the Wyoming Territory was created with the meridian as its eastern boundary. The Dakota Territory was divided into North Dakota and South Dakota when they became states on November 2, 1889, and Montana became a state just six days later. Wyoming became a state in 1890. The Montana-North Dakota, Montana-South Dakota, Wyoming-South Dakota, and Wyoming-Nebraska state borders therefore are all defined by the 27th meridian west from Washington.
