= 34th meridian west from Washington =

Archaic line of longitude

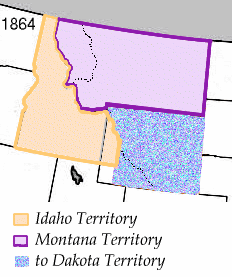
The partition of the Idaho Territory which gave the meridian its first usage as a boundary

The 34th meridian west from Washington is an archaic meridian based on the Washington Meridian and hence 111°2′48.0″ West of Greenwich. The meridian is most notably used as a boundary for four states. The east-west continental divide of North America crosses the 34th meridian at the tripoint between Idaho, Montana and Wyoming.

== Usage as a boundary ==
The meridian was first used as a boundary when the Montana Territory was created in 1864. It served as Montana Territory's extreme southwestern boundary. The next usage of the boundary came when the Wyoming Territory was established in 1868, with the meridian as its western boundary. It was also at this time that it became much of the then-Idaho Territory's eastern boundary, as well as the extreme northeastern boundary of the then-Utah Territory. Montana became a state in 1889, with Idaho and Wyoming following the year afterwards. Utah became a state in 1896.

In the present day, the meridian is used as Wyoming's western border with Montana, Idaho and Utah.
