= Union Pacific Coal Company =

The Union Pacific Coal Company was formed in 1874 as the Union Pacific Coal Department by the Union Pacific Railway. The company was formed because Union Pacific's former coal supplier, Wyoming Coal and Mining Company, was selling coal at highly inflated costs to the railroad.

== Founding ==
Before 1874 the Union Pacific Railway owned all of the mineral rights along its right-of-way but not a mining company, thus the Wyoming Mining and Coal Company provided coal to the railroad. This was a problem for UP because the coal company's stock was owned by Oliver Ames, the Wyoming Coal Company president and five members of the board of directors for UP. Wyoming Coal was able to sell its product back to UP at highly inflated costs. The railroad's reaction was to form the Union Pacific Coal Department in 1874.

== History ==
After the coal company's formation it began to find ways to make money from coal mining. The company was able to stop competition by influencing the railroad to charge high shipping costs to other coal companies. The United States Secretary of Interior stated, on December 2, 1874, that UP was selling Wyoming coal in Omaha, Nebraska for US$9 per ton while they charged other coal companies $10 per ton to ship their freight.

By 1890, the Union Pacific Coal Department was replaced by the Union Pacific Coal Company. The UP Coal Company was producing most of Wyoming's coal in mines located near Rock Springs.

== Gallery ==
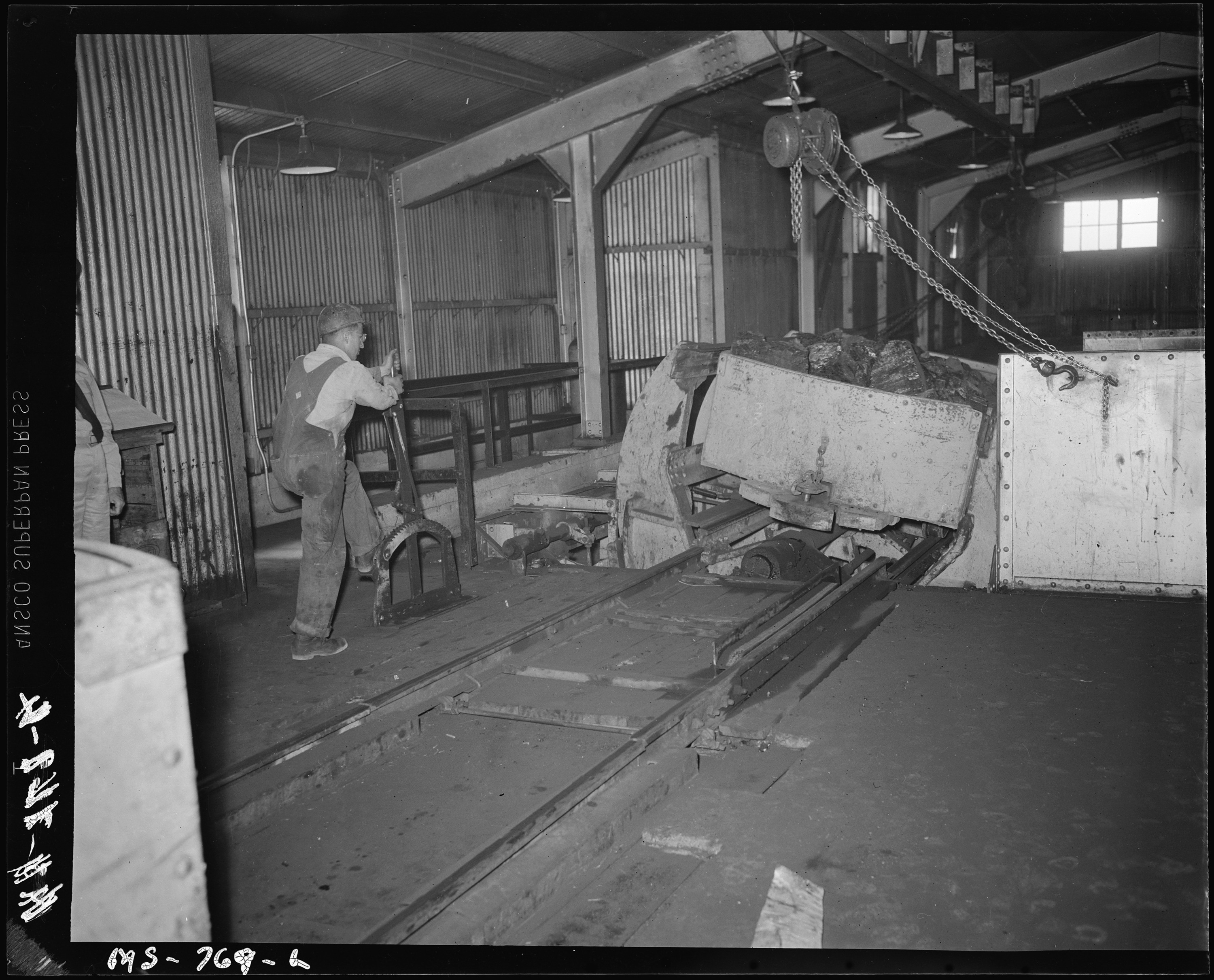
Operating rotary coal car unloader at the tipple. Union Pacific Coal Company, Stansbury Mine, Rock Springs.

Rock Springs, with coal mines and Union Pacific Railroad tracks in 1890

Rock Springs coal station, in Rock Springs, Wyoming in 1908. The Union Pacific Railroad coal chutes were used to load Union Pacific Railroad steam locomotives

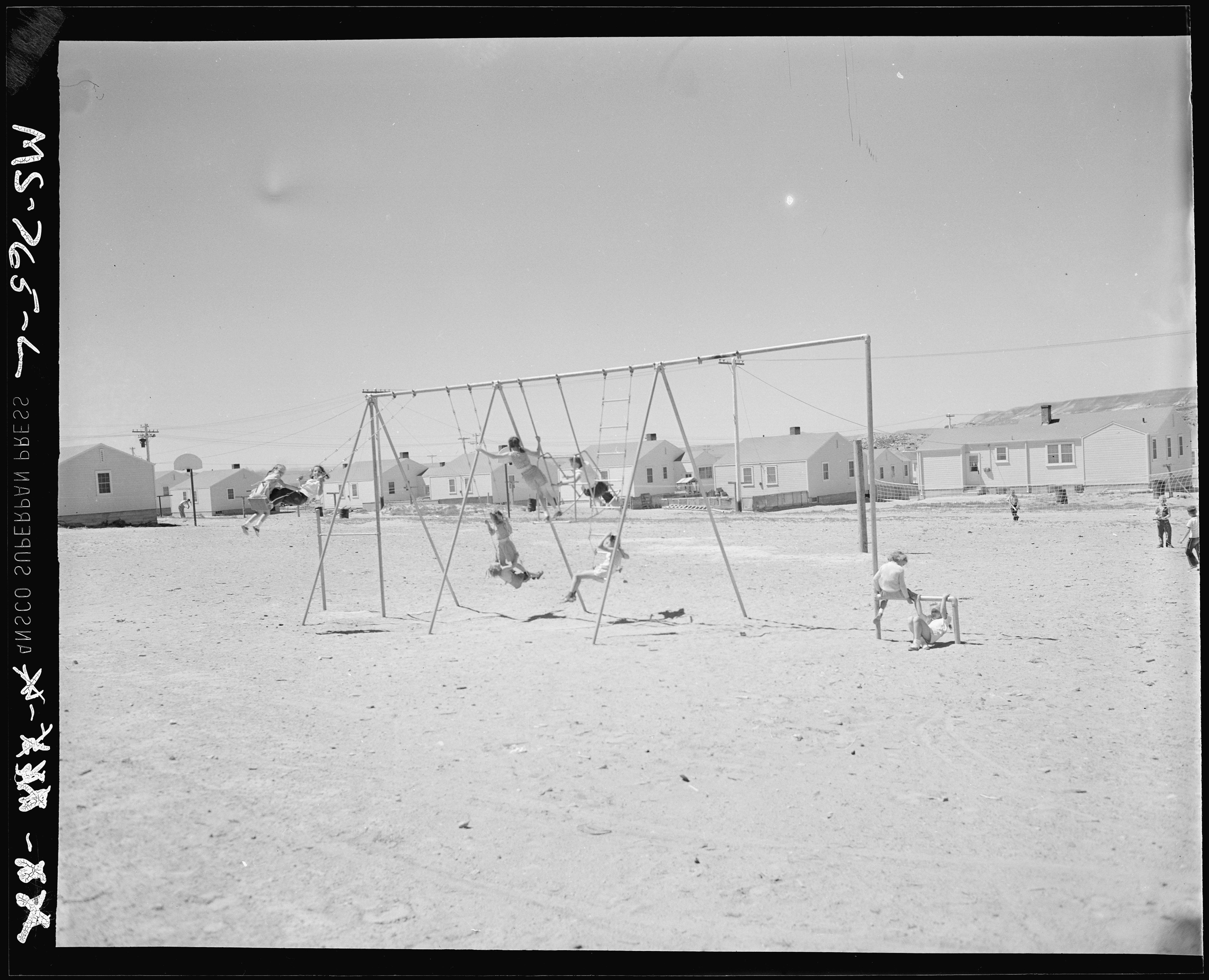
Playground for miner's children at the Union Pacific Coal Company's Stansbury Mine in Rock Springs

== See also ==
- Rock Springs station
- Union Pacific Big Boy
- Rock Springs coal station
