= National Register of Historic Places listings in Fremont County, Wyoming =

Location of Fremont County in Wyoming

This is a list of the National Register of Historic Places listings in Fremont County, Wyoming.

This is intended to be a complete list of the properties and districts on the National Register of Historic Places in Fremont County, Wyoming, United States. The locations of National Register properties and districts for which the latitude and longitude coordinates are included below, may be seen in a map.

There are 37 properties and districts listed on the National Register in the county, 1 of which is a National Historic Landmark.

This National Park Service list is complete through NPS recent listings posted April 24, 2026.

Contents: Counties in Wyoming
Albany - Big Horn - Campbell - Carbon - Converse - Crook - Fremont - Goshen - Hot Springs - Johnson - Laramie - Lincoln - Natrona - Niobrara - Park - Platte - Sheridan - Sublette - Sweetwater - Teton - Uinta - Washakie - Weston

== Current listings ==
	Name on the Register	Image	Date listed	Location	City or town	Description
1	Amoretti, Welty, Helmer & Co Bank	Amoretti, Welty, Helmer & Co Bank	September 27, 2019 (#100004423)	111 W. Ramshorn St. 43°32′01″N 109°38′01″W	Dubois	
2	Atlantic City Mercantile	Atlantic City Mercantile	April 25, 1985 (#85000869)	Rt. 62, Box 260; 42°29′15″N 108°43′47″W	Atlantic City	
3	BMU Bridge over Wind River	BMU Bridge over Wind River	February 22, 1985 (#85000421)	Wyoming Highway 132; 43°08′36″N 108°42′29″W	Ethete	Replaced
4	Brooks Lake Lodge		September 29, 1982 (#82004333)	Lower Brooks Lake-Shoshone National Forest; 43°44′47″N 110°00′23″W	Dubois	Partially damaged by fire July 28, 2019.
5	Carpenter Hotel Historic District	Carpenter Hotel Historic District	December 12, 2012 (#12001054)	290 Atlantic City Rd. 42°29′40″N 108°43′59″W	Atlantic City	
6	Castle Gardens Petroglyph Site	Castle Gardens Petroglyph Site	April 16, 1969 (#69000189)	Castle Garden Road; 42°55′45″N 107°36′49″W	Moneta	
7	Chief Washakie Hot Springs Site		April 7, 2025 (#100009578)	3 miles (4.8 km) east of Fort Washakie on Ethete Highway; 43°00′27″N 108°50′06″W	Fort Washakie vicinity	
8	CM Ranch and Simpson Lake Cabins		September 15, 1992 (#92001249)	State Fish Hatchery Rd. south of Dubois off U.S. Route 287; 43°28′08″N 109°39′03″W	Dubois	
9	Dean Decker Site (48FR916; 48SW541)	Dean Decker Site (48FR916; 48SW541)	March 12, 1986 (#86000354)	Address restricted	Honeycomb Buttes	Extends into Sweetwater County
10	Delfelder Schoolhouse	Delfelder Schoolhouse	March 29, 1978 (#78002826)	North of Riverton off U.S. Route 26; 43°05′01″N 108°21′37″W	Riverton	
11	Diamond A Ranch	Diamond A Ranch	August 19, 1991 (#91001026)	Off U.S. Routes 26/287 northeast of Whiskey Mountain; 43°28′43″N 109°30′09″W	Dubois	
12	ELS Bridge over Big Wind River	ELS Bridge over Big Wind River	February 22, 1985 (#85000420)	County Road CN10-21; 43°32′47″N 109°40′02″W	Dubois	Has been replaced
13	ELY Wind River Diversion Dam Bridge	ELY Wind River Diversion Dam Bridge	February 22, 1985 (#85000422)	County Road CN10-24; 43°13′30″N 108°57′16″W	Morton	
14	Fort Washakie Historic District	Fort Washakie Historic District	April 16, 1969 (#69000188)	Wind River Indian Reservation on U.S. Route 287; 43°00′22″N 108°52′59″W	Fort Washakie	
15	Green Mountain Arrow Site	Green Mountain Arrow Site	March 12, 1986 (#86000351)	Address restricted	Stratton Rim	
16	Hamilton City	Hamilton City	June 4, 1980 (#80004047)	Northeast of Atlantic City; 42°31′58″N 108°40′55″W	Atlantic City	
17	High Rise Village	High Rise Village	July 23, 2013 (#13000542)	Address restricted	Dubois vicinity	
18	Jackson Park Town Site Addition Brick Row	Jackson Park Town Site Addition Brick Row	February 27, 2003 (#03000083)	615, 635, and 677 S. 3rd St. 42°49′39″N 108°43′58″W	Lander	
19	C. H. King Company and First National Bank of Shoshoni	C. H. King Company and First National Bank of Shoshoni	September 8, 1994 (#94001135)	127 Main St. 43°14′06″N 108°06′25″W	Shoshoni	Also known as Old Yellowstone Drug
20	Lander Downtown Historic District	Lander Downtown Historic District	May 5, 1987 (#87000700)	Main St. between 2nd and 4th Sts. 42°49′59″N 108°43′55″W	Lander	
21	Helen Lookingbill Site	Helen Lookingbill Site	March 20, 2013 (#13000102)	Address restricted	Dubois	
22	Quien Sabe Ranch		April 18, 1991 (#91000434)	Quien Sabe Ranch Rd., 18 mi (29 km) northeast of Shoshoni; 43°23′40″N 107°59′35″W	Shoshoni	
23	Riverton Railroad Depot	Riverton Railroad Depot	May 22, 1978 (#78002827)	1st and Main Sts. 43°01′28″N 108°23′24″W	Riverton	
24	St. Andrew's Episcopal Church	St. Andrew's Episcopal Church	December 11, 2023 (#100009595)	90 East Forbes Street; 42°29′49″N 108°43′51″W	Atlantic City	
25	Shoshone-Episcopal Mission	Shoshone-Episcopal Mission	April 11, 1973 (#73001931)	3 mi (4.8 km) southwest of Fort Washakie on Moccasin Lake Rd. 42°59′09″N 108°54′17″W	Fort Washakie	Destroyed by fire in 2016
26	South Pass	South Pass	October 15, 1966 (#66000754)	About 10 mi (16 km) southwest of South Pass City on Wyoming Highway 28; 42°22′12″N 108°54′49″W	South Pass City	
27	South Pass City Historic District	South Pass City Historic District	February 26, 1970 (#70000670)	South Pass Rd.; also 675 Atlantic City Rd. 42°28′16″N 108°48′19″W	South Pass City	Originally listed simply as "South Pass City"; name changed in 2012
28	Split Rock Prehistoric Site	Split Rock Prehistoric Site	May 4, 1987 (#87000662)	Address restricted	Split Rock Ranch	
29	St. Michael's Mission	St. Michael's Mission	June 21, 1971 (#71000886)	In Ethete; 43°01′30″N 108°46′22″W	Ethete	
30	T Cross Ranch Rural Historic District	T Cross Ranch Rural Historic District	April 11, 2008 (#07000371)	Address restricted	Dubois	
31	Torrey Lake Club/Ranch Historic District	Torrey Lake Club/Ranch Historic District	August 12, 1991 (#91000999)	Along the western shores of Lake Julia, Torrey Lake, and Ring Lake; 43°27′38″N 109°33′21″W	Dubois	
32	Torrey Lake Petroglyph District	Torrey Lake Petroglyph District	October 4, 1993 (#93000983)	Address restricted	Dubois	
33	Twin Pines Lodge and Cabin Camp	Twin Pines Lodge and Cabin Camp	December 10, 1993 (#93001382)	218 W. Ramshorn; 43°32′01″N 109°38′04″W	Dubois	
34	Union Pass	Union Pass	April 16, 1969 (#69000367)	On the Continental Divide in Teton National Forest; 43°28′54″N 109°52′24″W	Dubois	
35	US Post Office and Courthouse-Lander Main	US Post Office and Courthouse-Lander Main	May 19, 1987 (#87000782)	177 N. 3rd St. 42°50′02″N 108°43′50″W	Lander	
36	Welty's General Store	Welty's General Store	November 15, 1979 (#79003680)	220 Ramshorn St. 43°32′01″N 109°37′59″W	Dubois	
37	Wind River Agency Blockhouse	Wind River Agency Blockhouse	December 23, 2000 (#00001589)	Address restricted	Fort Washakie	

== See also ==
- List of National Historic Landmarks in Wyoming
- National Register of Historic Places listings in Wyoming
