= Halff =

Halff is a surname. Notable people with the surname include:

- Arlette Halff (1908–2007), French tennis player
- Betty Halff-Epstein (1905-1991), Swiss entrepreneur
- Henry Mayer Halff (1874–1934), American rancher, horse breeder, and polo player
- Mayer Halff (1836–1905), American rancher
