= Pinnacle Buttes =

Mountain in Wyoming, United States

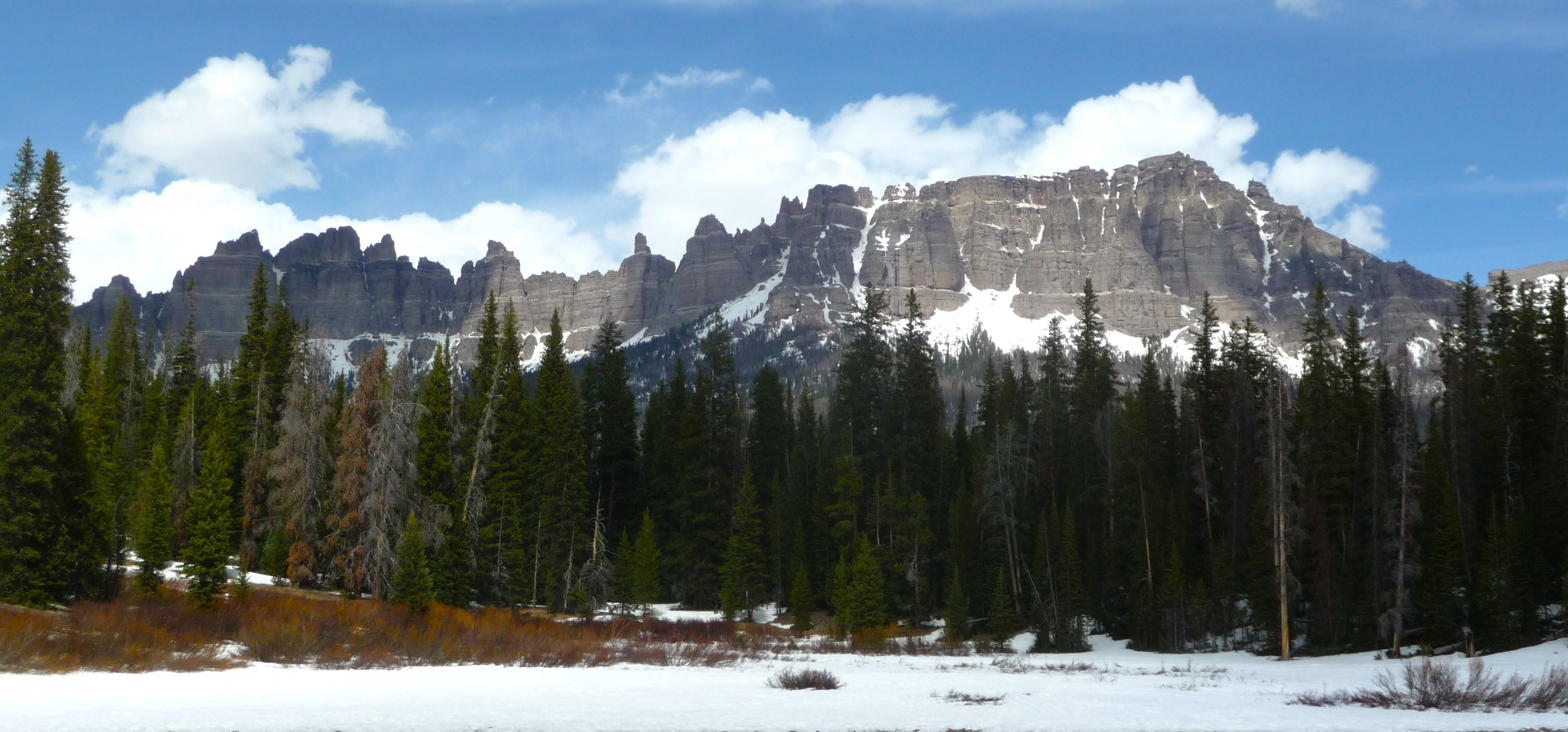
- Southwest aspect

Highest point
- Elevation: 11,516 ft (3,510 m)
- Prominence: 1,576 ft (480 m)
- Parent peak: The Ramshorn
- Isolation: 10.72 mi (17.25 km)
- Coordinates: 43°44′54″N 109°57′27″W

Dimensions
- Length: 3 mi (4.8 km) North-South
- Width: 2 mi (3.2 km) East-West

Geography
- Location within Wyoming Location within the United States
- Country: United States
- State: Wyoming
- County: Fremont
- Parent range: Absaroka Range; Rocky Mountains
- Topo map: USGS Kisinger Lakes

Geology
- Rock age: Paleogene
- Rock type(s): Wiggins Formation, volcanic breccia, conglomerate

Climbing
- Easiest route: class 3 scrambling

Pinnacle Buttes is an 11,516-foot-elevation (3,510-meter) mountain summit located in Fremont County, Wyoming, United States.

== Description ==
Pinnacle Buttes is situated approximately four miles east of the Continental Divide in the Absaroka Range which is a subrange of the Rocky Mountains. It is set on land managed by Shoshone National Forest with precipitation runoff from the mountain draining into tributaries of the Wind River. Topographic relief is significant as the summit rises nearly 2,900 feet (880 meters) above Brooks Lake Creek in 1.8 mile (2.9 km). Pinnacle Buttes can be seen for up to 15 miles from U.S. Route 26 / U.S. 287 in the Togwotee Pass area. The peaks are also a backdrop at historic Brooks Lake Lodge and Brooks Lake. The nearest town is Dubois, Wyoming, 22 miles to the southeast. The mountain's toponym has been officially adopted by the United States Board on Geographic Names, and was in use in 1914 as "Pinnacle Butte" when published in an USGS bulletin.

== Climate ==
According to the Köppen climate classification system, Pinnacle Buttes is located in an alpine subarctic climate zone with cold, snowy winters, and cool to warm summers. Due to its altitude, it receives precipitation all year, as snow in winter, and as thunderstorms in summer.

== See also ==
- List of mountain peaks of Wyoming
- Tepee Trail Formation

== Gallery ==
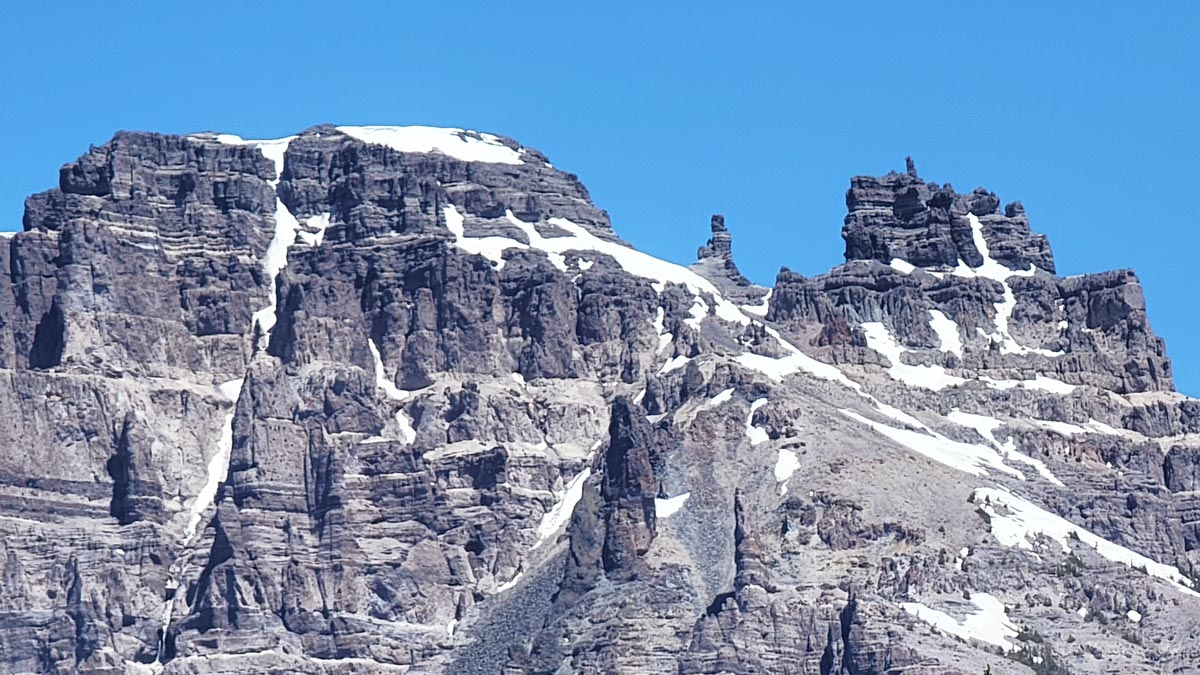

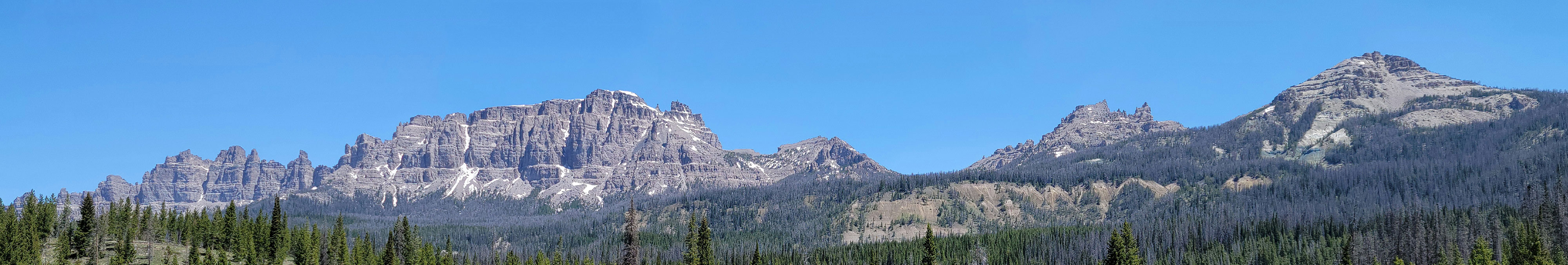

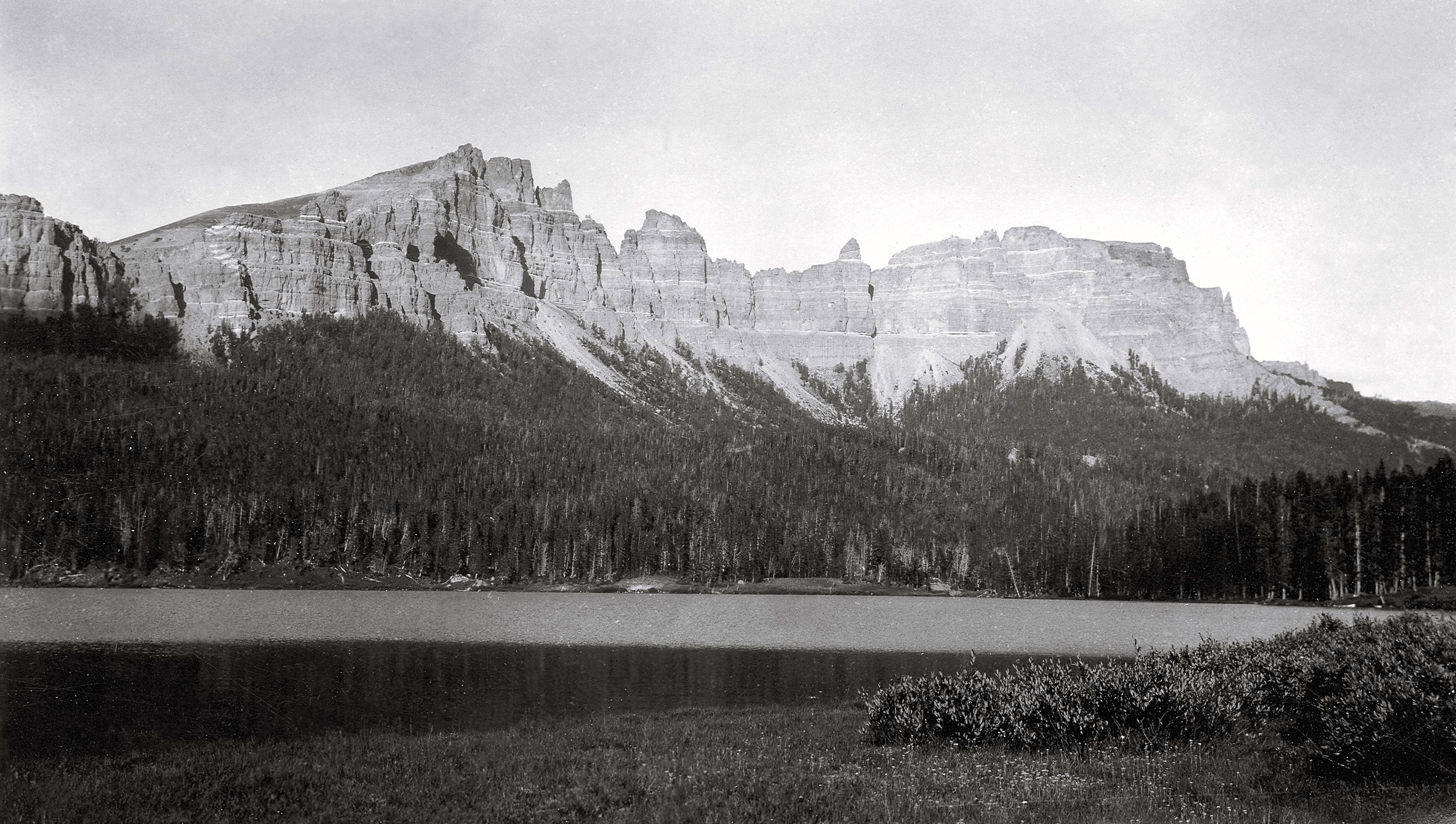
Pinnacle Butte(s) from Brooks Lake in 1923.
