= Diamond A Ranch =

Diamond A Ranch may refer to:

- Diamond A Ranch (Roswell, New Mexico), on the National Register of Historic Places listings in Chaves County, New Mexico
- Diamond A Ranch (Dubois, Wyoming), on the National Register of Historic Places listings in Fremont County, Wyoming
