= Castle Gardens =

Castle Gardens may refer to:

- Castle Gardens Petroglyph Site

== See also ==
- Castle Clinton, formerly Castle Garden, New York
