= Diamond Ranch =

Diamond Ranch may refer to:

- Diamond Ranch (Chugwater, Wyoming), listed on the National Register of Historic Places listings in Platte County, Wyoming
- Diamond Ranch High School
- Diamond Ranch Academy

== See also ==
- Diamond A Ranch (disambiguation)
