= Twin Pines Lodge and Cabin Camp =

- U.S. National Register of Historic Places
- U.S. Historic district
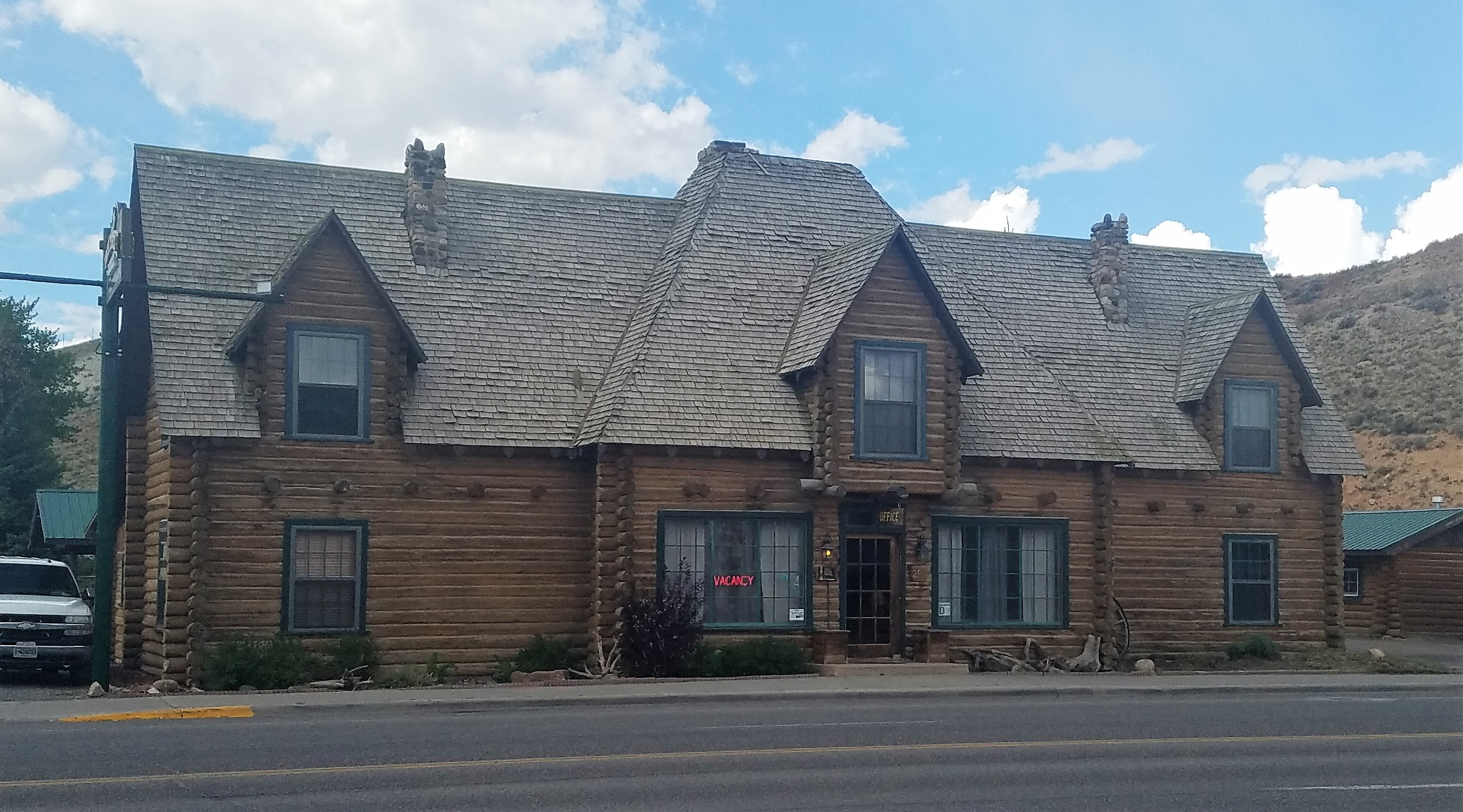

- Location within Wyoming Location within the United States
- Location: 218 W. Ramshorn, Dubois, Wyoming
- Coordinates: 43°32′02.06″N 109°38′06.64″W
- Area: 2 acres (0.81 ha)
- Built: 1929
- Architect: Stringer, Oliver Ernest; Johnson, Ernest
- Architectural style: Log architecture
- NRHP reference No.: 93001382
- Added to NRHP: December 10, 1993

The Twin Pines Lodge and Cabin Camp, also known as the Twin Pines Motel and Frontier Court, is a tourist camp in Dubois, Wyoming on the way to Yellowstone National Park on U.S. Route 287. The camp was established in 1929 by Dubois businessman Oliver Ernest Stringer who designed the camp and assisted in its construction. Stringer had previously been involved in the construction of the Brooks Lake Lodge, where he built furniture.

Stringer came to Dubois in 1901 with his mother, sister and three older brothers. He was born in 1888 in Ohio. Establishing a homestead near Dubois, the family quickly became prominent in the area. Brothers Albert and Oscar built the Stringer Hotel in 1913, with Ernest assisting, and Ernest worked on the local episcopal church and family homes.

Stringer bought the camp site in 1929, calling it Frontier Court. In 1934, he built five log cabins and a central camp building. The main lodge was started in 1939 and was completed in 1941, when the name was changed to Twin Pines, named for two blue spruces that Stringer planted at the entrance. By 1950 Stringer had sold the property.

== Description ==
The main lodge is directly on the street. It is a 1-1/2 story log structure with a steeply-sloping hipped center section flanked by gable extensions. The "twin pines" were directly in front. To the rear is a carport with a catslide roof next to a double-gabled extension. The interior features extensive exposed log construction. The cabins are one-story log structures with shallow gabled roofs. Many have graduated saddle-notched log corner details and craftsman style trim and accessories.

The Twin Pines was placed on the National Register of Historic Places on December 10, 1993. It continues to operate as a cabin camp.

Twin Pines is owned by a Wyoming hospitality company called UncleToby307, LLC which includes former Cheyenne City Council President Dicky Shanor.

== See also ==
- List of motels
