= Henry Mayer Halff =

American rancher, horse breeder and polo player

- Born: August 17, 1874; San Antonio, Texas, U.S.
- Died: March 20, 1934 (aged 59); Richardson, Texas, U.S.
- Resting place: Emanu-El Cemetery, Dallas, Texas, U.S.
- Education: Staunton Military Academy; Eastman Business College
- Occupations: Rancher, horse breeder, polo player
- Spouse: Rosa Wechsler
- Children: 2 sons, 2 daughters
- Parent(s): Mayer Halff; Rachel Hart

Henry Mayer Halff (1874–1934) was an American rancher, horse breeder and polo player.

== Early life ==
Henry Mayer Halff was born on August 17, 1874, in San Antonio, Texas. His father, Mayer Halff, was a French immigrant who became a large rancher in Texas. His mother was Rachel Hart.

Halff was educated at the Staunton Military Academy, a male-only military boarding school in Staunton, Virginia. He graduated from Eastman Business College, a business school in Poughkeepsie, New York.

Halff served in the Spanish–American War.

== Career ==
Halff moved to Midland, Texas, to embark upon a career in ranching in 1904. He ranched in Midland County, Crane County, Crockett County and Upton County. He inherited the Quien Sabe Ranch in Midland County and the JM Ranch in Upton County from his father. He raised Hereford cattle and grew honeydew melon.

Halff was the owner of the H.M. Halff Polo Farm, a polo and horsebreeder farm in Midland, Texas. He bred Belgian stallions with draft horses. He also bred Thoroughbreds with mares to produce polo ponies.

Halff was the owner of a real estate business in Midland. When he moved to Mineral Wells, Texas, in 1925, he ran a real estate business there. When he moved to Dallas in 1929, he ran a real estate business there as well. Halff served as the president of the West Texas Chamber of Commerce.

Halff was a member of the Rotary Club.

== Personal life ==
Halff married Rosa Wechsler in 1905. They had two sons and two daughters. He retired to a farm in Richardson, Texas, in 1931.

== Death ==
Halff died on March 20, 1934, in Richardson, Texas. His funeral was held at Temple Emanu-El. He was buried at the Emanu-El Cemetery in Dallas, Texas.
