= Amoretti, Welty, Helmer & Co Bank =

- U.S. National Register of Historic Places
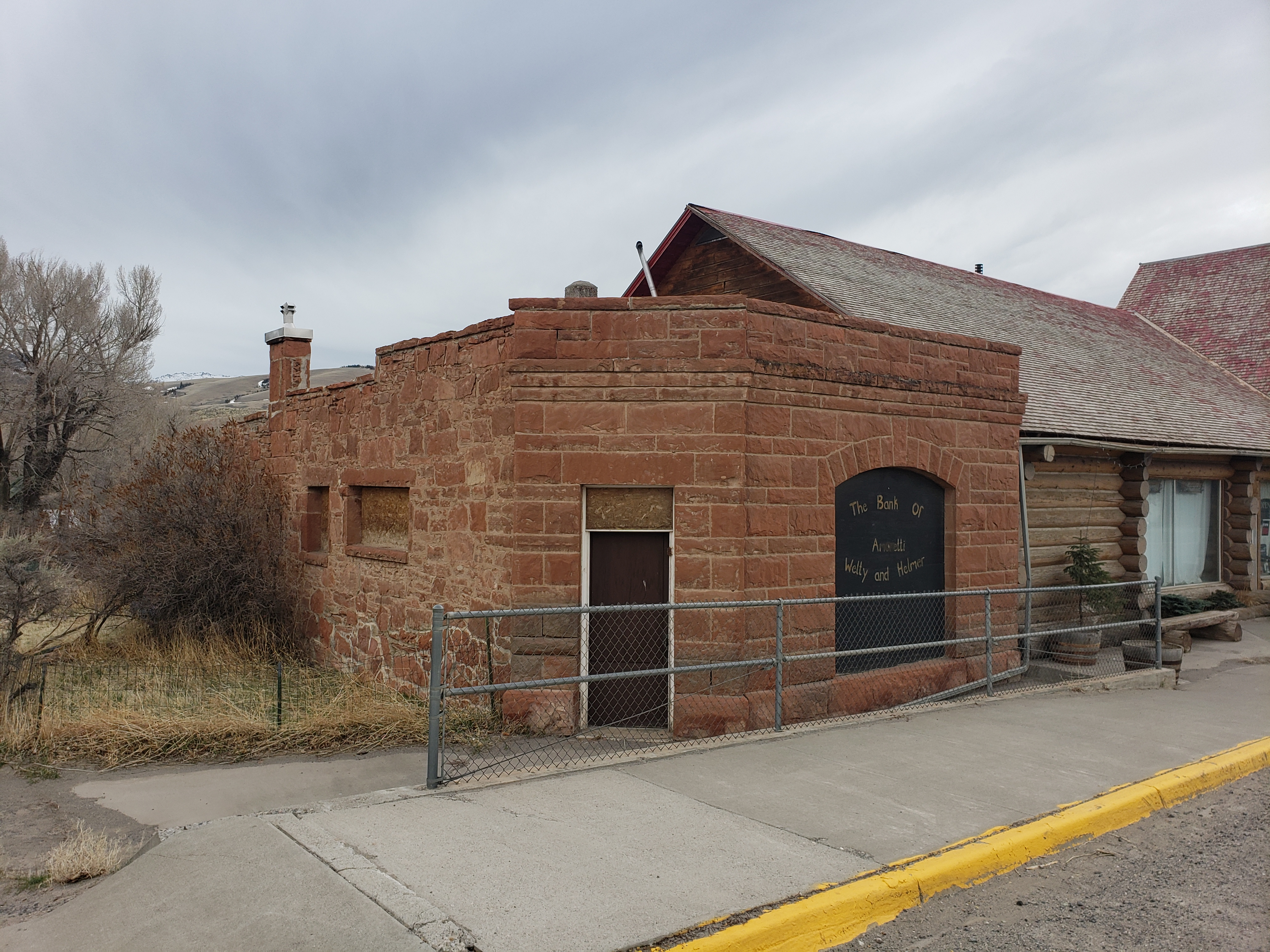

- Location within Wyoming Location within the United States
- Location: 109/111 West Ramshorn Street, Dubois, Fremont County, Wyoming
- Coordinates: 43°32′01″N 109°38′01″W
- Area: 0.5 acres (0.20 ha)
- Built: 1913
- NRHP reference No.: 100004423
- Added to NRHP: September 27, 2019

Amoretti, Welty, Helmer & Co Bank is a historic building located in the town of Dubois, Fremont County, Wyoming. Built-in 1911–13, it is listed on the National Register of Historic Places.

== History ==
Frank A. Welty Sr. and others built the one-story bank in 1911–13. The structure of the building features a flat roof and a short parapet and it is built with locally sourced red sandstone. The bank's construction began in 1911, and it opened for business in 1913. As the town of Dubois's first bank, it acted as a hub for financial activities and investment. The bank was operated by the town's founder Frank A. Welty and bankers, Ernest B. Helmer and Eugene Amoretti Jr.

== See also ==
- Welty's General Store
