= Carpenter Hotel Historic District =

- U.S. National Register of Historic Places
- U.S. Historic district
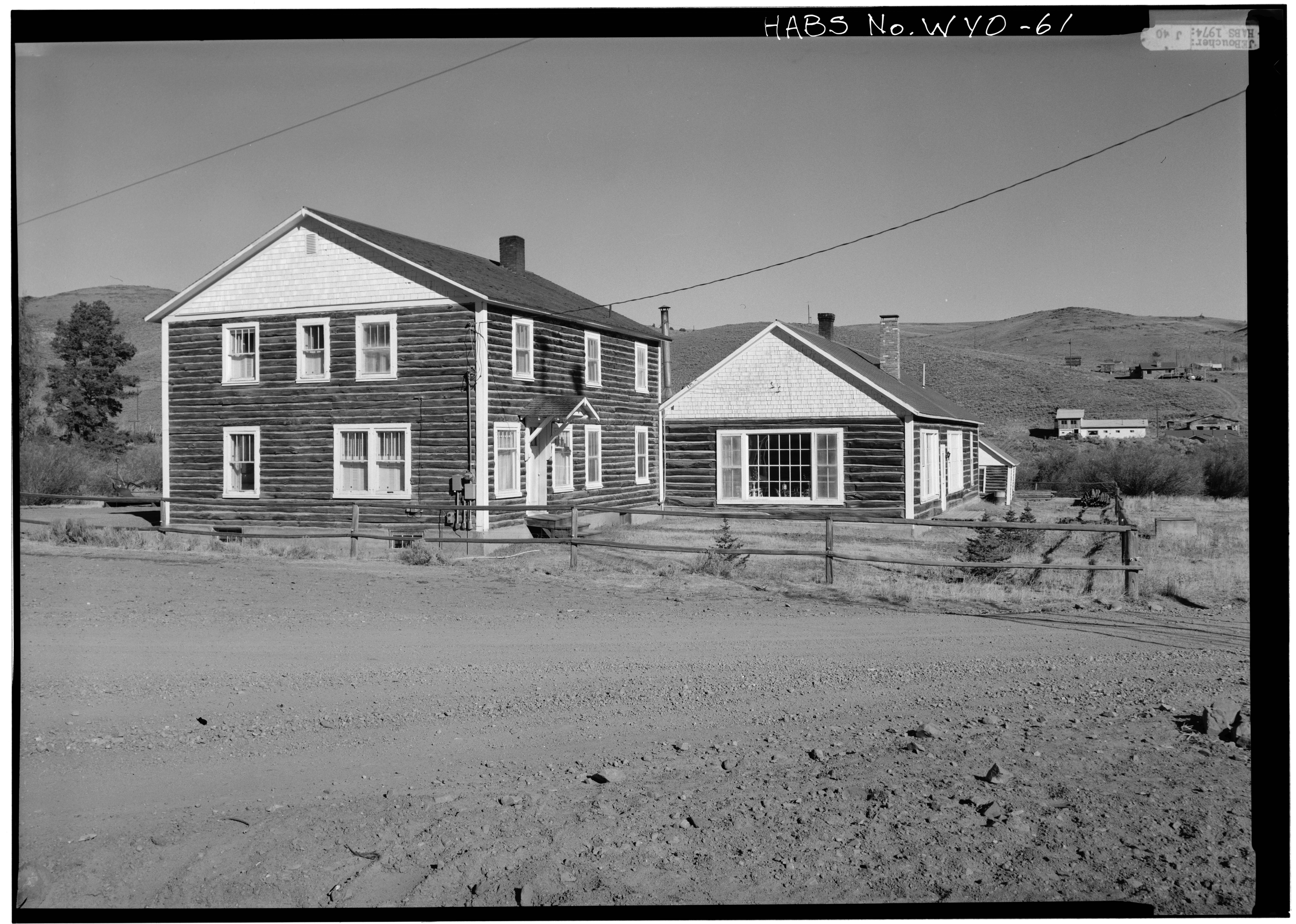

- Location within Wyoming Location within the United States
- Nearest city: Atlantic City, Wyoming
- Coordinates: 42°29′40″N 108°43′59″W
- Built: 1904
- NRHP reference No.: 12001054
- Added to NRHP: December 12, 2012

The Carpenter Hotel Historic District comprises a hotel complex near Atlantic City, Wyoming. Also known as the Miner's Delight Inn, the hotel was established by Nellie Carpenter in 1904 with six rooms and a dining room. The hotel was expanded in 1935 with a two-story section and five guest cabins. The hotel housed Atlantic City's post office from 1930 to 1953. The Carpenter family sold the hotel in 1963 following Nellie's death. It continues to operate as a hotel.

The Carpenter Hotel was listed on the National Register of Historic Places on September 29, 1982.
