= Jackson Park Town Site Addition Brick Row =

- U.S. National Register of Historic Places
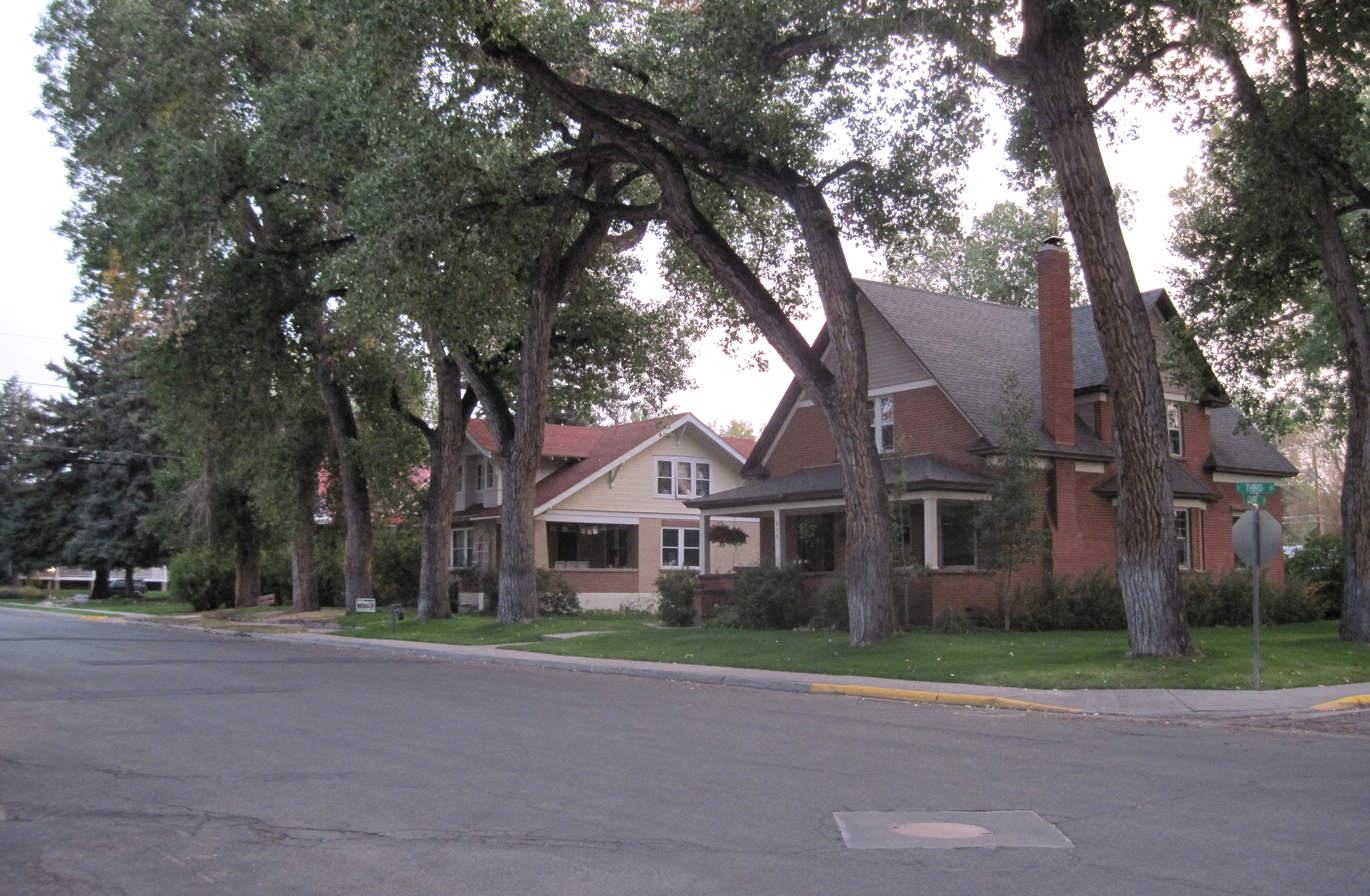
- The houses of the Jackson Park Town Site Addition Brick Row

- Location within Wyoming Location within the United States
- Location: 615, 635 and 677 S. Third St., Lander, Wyoming
- Coordinates: 42°49′40″N 108°44′2″W
- Area: less than one acre
- Built: 1917, 1919
- Built by: Unknown; Packard, Dan
- Architectural style: Bungalow/Craftsman
- NRHP reference No.: 03000083
- Added to NRHP: February 27, 2003

Jackson Park Town Site Addition Brick Row is a group of three historic houses and two frame garages located on the west side of the 300 block of South Third Street in Lander, Wyoming. Two of the homes were built in 1917, and the third in 1919. The properties were added to the National Register of Historic Places on February 27, 2003.

== 615 South Third Street ==
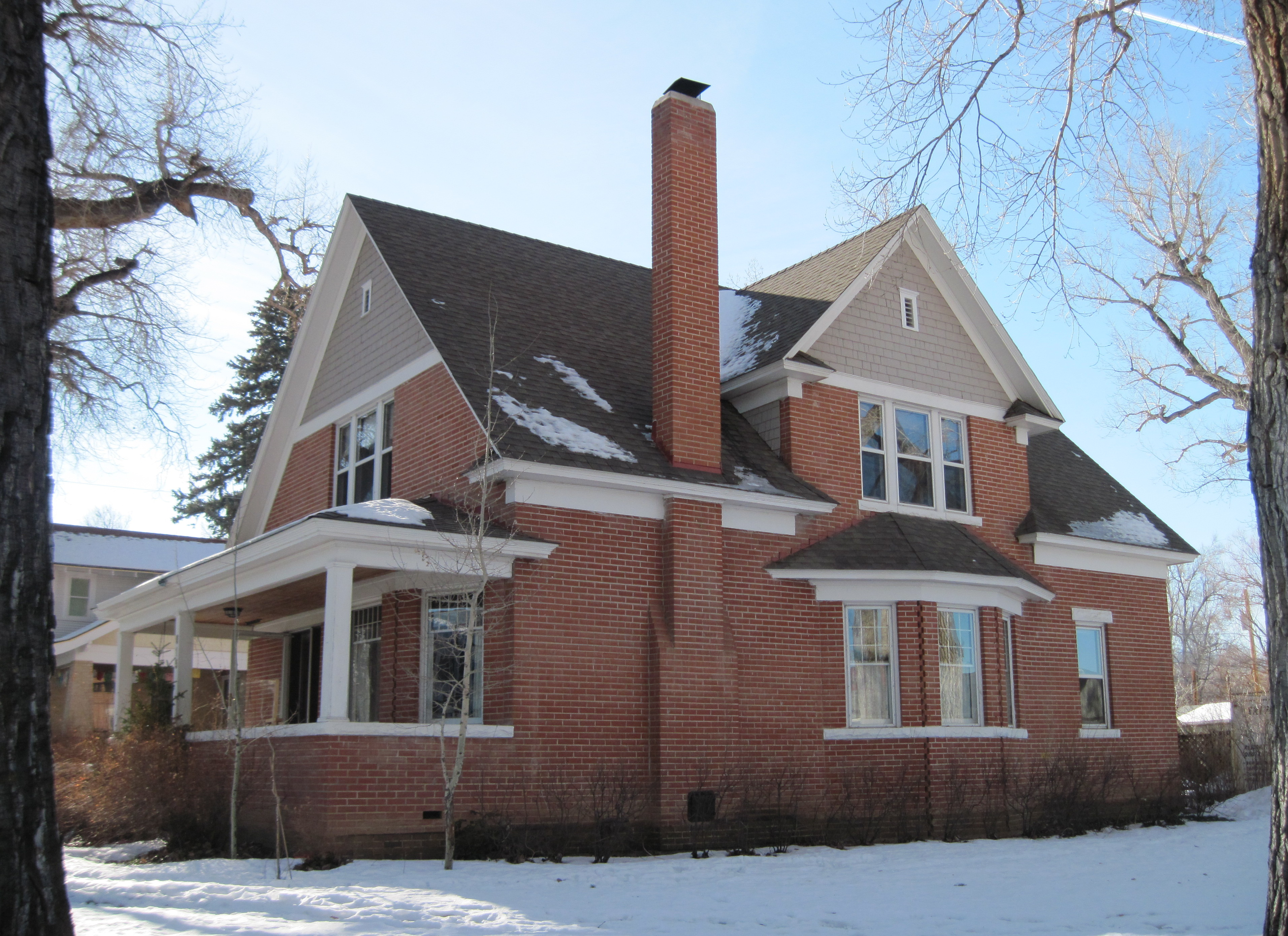
615 S. 3rd St., southeast elevation)

The 1 1/2-story brick house at 615 South Third Street was built for Alexander (Scotty) Johnston, a successful sheep rancher, in 1917. The structure is situated on three lots lined with large cottonwood trees. Red brick covers the building on all sides, with a partial foundation visible at the bottom of the exterior walls and a water table of brown brick runs around the entire structure about two feet above grade. The roof is gable-fronted, with two projecting side dormers. A full-length porch built on the front of the building features a hipped roof supported by boxed columns. The porch railings and all the home's windowsills (with the exception of two on the back porch) are sandstone. A second porch on the back of the house was originally screened in but was winterized with the addition of two casement windows in 1999. A detached garage is set slightly behind the structure.

The front porch, accessible via concrete steps, leads to the paneled oak front door with beveled glass. The screen door, of white aluminum, was installed in 2001. To the right of the front door is a bay window with decorative brickwork. A similar bay window with a hipped roof is located on the right (north) side of the home, next to a tall brick chimney. Towards the rear of the building, also on the right side, is a single-hung window. On the rear of the house, wooden steps (reconstructed in 1999) lead onto the enclosed back porch through a wooden screen door and a wooden paneled door. A single double-hung window is the only one on the first-floor rear of the house. On the left (south) side of the structure is a pair of double-hung windows next to a door leading to the basement.

Both second-floor gables of the home and both dormers sport double-hung windows. Wood shingles cover the dormer walls from the tops of these windows to the roof. The roof itself originally utilized wood shingles as well, but these have been replaced with asphalt shingles.

Inside the building are oak woodwork and wooden flooring. Separating the parlor, living room, and dining room from each other are two colonnaded bookcases. The dining room features a large Craftsman-style china cabinet with leaded glass. The kitchen, which sits off the dining room, has oak cabinets and granite counters. The updated TV room/guest room features a full bathroom and is located in the rear of the home. The second floor, accessed by a bracketed oak staircase at the front entry, contains three bedrooms, one with a half bath. An updated master bath is located at the end of the west hallway and features era-matching walk-in shower, along with a clawfoot tub and double sink vanity.

== 635 South Third Street ==
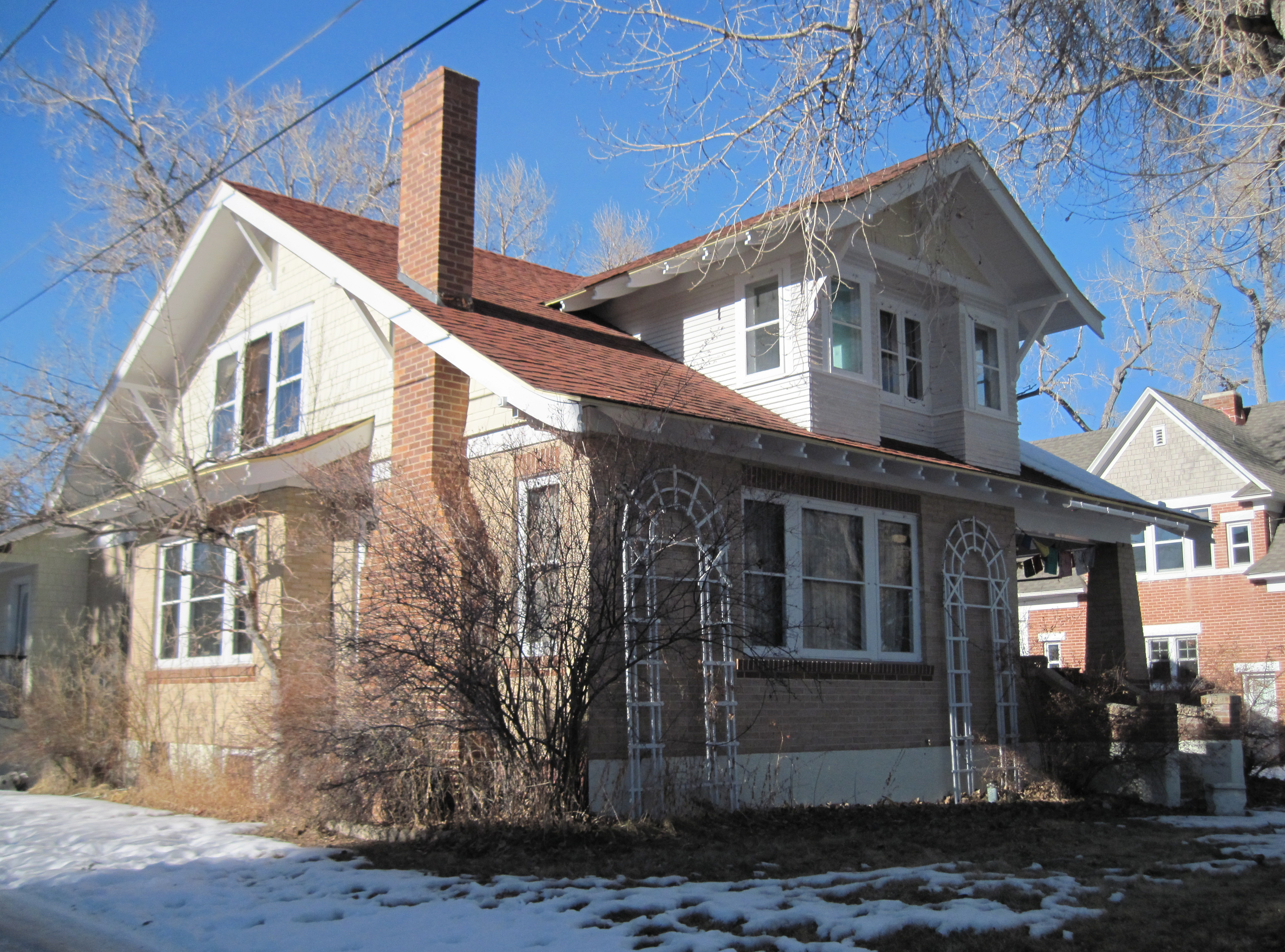
635 S. 3rd St., southeast elevation)

The 1 1/2-story Arts and Crafts bungalow at 635 South Third Street, sandwiched between the other two houses of the Jackson Park Town Site Addition Brick Row, was constructed in 1919 for Leslie Read (grandson of pioneer Lander businessman Major Noyes Baldwin) by carpenter Dan Packard. The roof is side-gabled, with a dormer on the front and another dating from 1989 on the back. The house shares three tree-lined lots with a detached two-car garage accessible from the alley running along the property's south (left) border. The house's foundation is visible for about two feet over ground level and is covered in stucco. The first story is covered in blonde brick, while the porch railings and the flat arches and sills of all but one of the first-floor windows utilize brown brick.

Fronting the house are three double-hung windows, to the right of which is situated a "cutaway" front porch with a single tapering brick column at the structure's northeast corner. A pair of double-hung windows look into the house from the back wall of the porch, and the Craftsman-style front door with stained glass is in the porch's east wall. A pair of double-hung windows and a single-double hung window are on the house's right (north) side. Another double-hung window is on the rear of the building, next to a small window that once utilized a double-hung sash but has been changed to glass block for privacy, as the window looks into a bathroom. Also on the rear of the house is a 1989 addition on a concrete block foundation, with exterior walls finished in wood shingles, a picture window and a gable roof. The addition was built in a manner that complements the building's original styling. A bay window with three double-hung windows and a shed roof is on the structure's south (left) side, toward the rear of the house; toward the front is a chimney flanked by single double-hung windows. Also on the left side of the house, a wooden storm door and a paneled door lead into the basement.

The gabled second-floor ends of the building are covered in wood shingles and feature triple-ganged double-hung windows. The roof's gabled front dormer is finished in wood lap siding, although the actual gable in covered with wood shingles. A pair of double-hung windows are centered in the front of the dormer, flanked by single double-hung windows. The rear dormer, added after the original construction, sports triple-ganged double-hung windows and wood shingles. The home's roof is covered in asphalt shingles, and features the exposed rafter tails and knee braces.

The inside of the house echoes the Arts and Crafts styling of the exterior, with oak flooring and pine woodwork. A living room, dining room, kitchen, den, bathroom, and bedroom are on the first floor, while three bedrooms and an additional bathroom dating from 1989 are upstairs.

== 677 South Third Street ==
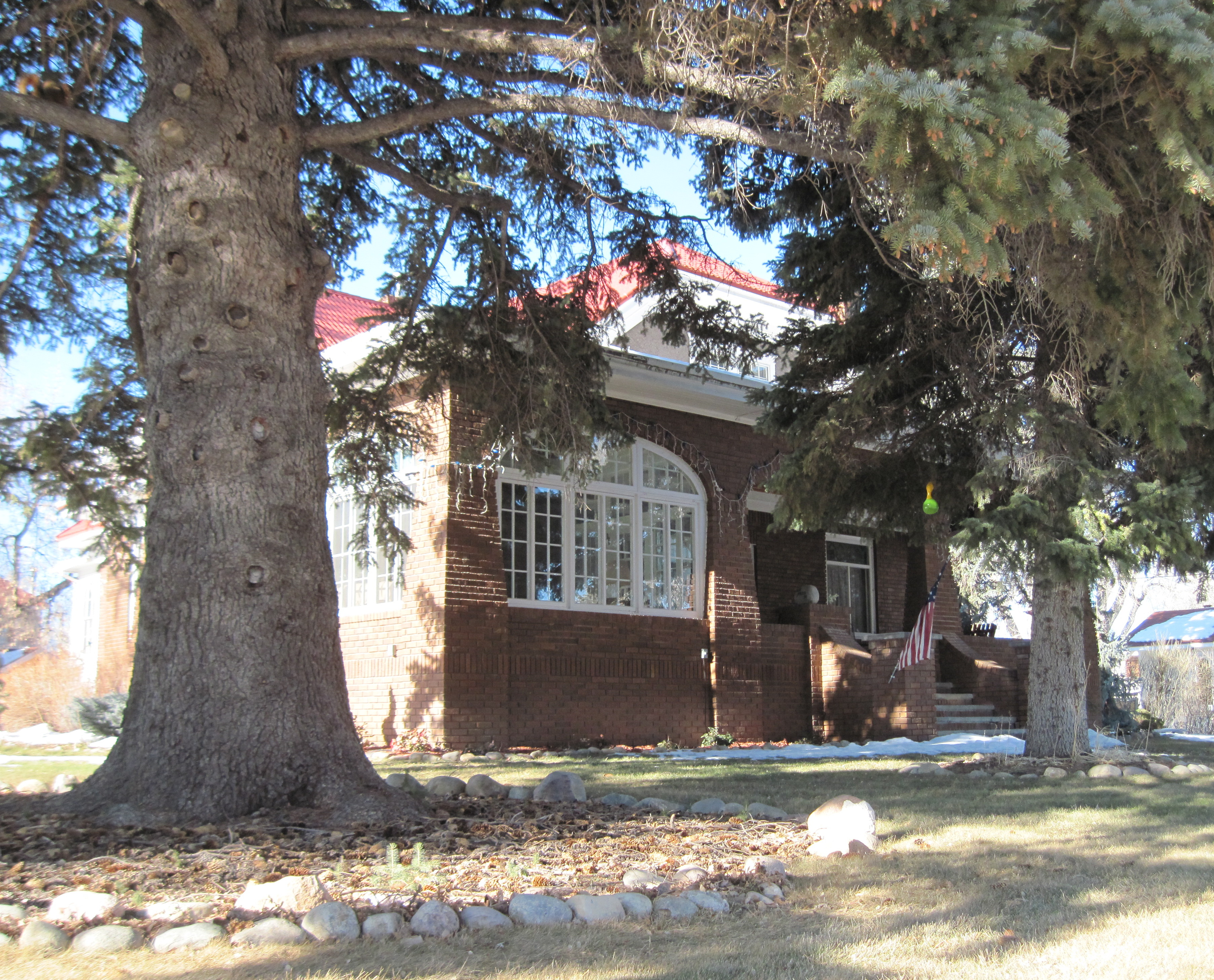
677 S. 3rd St., southeast elevation

The third house of the Jackson Park Town Site Addition Brick Row is a large 1 1/2-story Arts & Crafts home occupying three lots at the northwest corner of 3rd and Cascade Streets, with several large blue spruce trees and gardens. The home was built in 1919 for Frank S. Bower, a local lumberyard owner and sheep rancher. Fronted by a partially enclosed wraparound porch, the house is topped by an intersecting gable roof. A two-car garage built to match the house is attached on a rear corner. The house's exterior is covered in brown brick, with the concrete foundation visible for approximately one foot above grade.

Concrete and brick stairs lead onto the porch, the roof of which is supported by six brick columns with decorative arches in between. Large cottage windows with stained glass headers are on either side of a Craftsman-style front door with a stained glass insert. Part of the porch was enclosed with eight-light casement windows in 1935. The most prominent feature on the structure's left (north) side is a large window bay, sharing the wall with a chimney flanked by three double-hung windows and two more double-hung windows next to a side entry, with a wooden storm door and a wooden paneled door. Sharing the back of the structure with the attached garage, a large enclosed porch sports six double-hung windows and a hipped roof. The left (north) side of the house includes more windows, with a window bay matching the one on the right side of the house and a set of triple-ganged double-hung windows flanked by two single double-hung windows.

The roof's front gable, clipped in the front to form a jerkinhead like the house's other three gables, has a pair of double-hung windows flanked by two small triangular windows; the gable end is finished in stucco. The gables on the left and right sides of the roof are built similarly. The rear gable, however, features two double-hung windows flanking a picture window; the picture window replaced a set of French doors opening onto an upper-level porch that was later removed.

A spacious living room, dining room, sitting room, bathroom, bedroom, and kitchen are located on the first floor. The woodwork, central staircase, and floors are all oak. The home also sports a built-in buffet, pocket doors, and ten-foot ceilings with ornate crown molding. On the second floor are a large reading room, three bedrooms, and three bathrooms.

== See also ==
- National Register of Historic Places in Fremont County, Wyoming
