= T Cross Ranch Rural Historic District =

- U.S. National Register of Historic Places
- U.S. Historic district
- Location within Wyoming Location within the United States
- Nearest city: Dubois, Wyoming
- Coordinates: 43.7052°N 109.6339°W
- Area: 260 acres (110 ha)
- Built: 1918
- Built by: Henry M. Seipt, Robert S. Cox
- Architectural style: Log Cabin
- NRHP reference No.: 07000371
- Added to NRHP: April 11, 2008

T Cross Ranch is a dude ranch in Fremont County, Wyoming. The ranch is located at 7,800 feet (2,400 m) altitude in Shoshone National Forest, 15 miles (24 km) from Dubois and 2 miles (3.2 km) from the Washakie Wilderness. Apart from a cabin built by the site's original homesteader, the contributing buildings of the ranch date between 1916 and 1946. The ranch was established in 1918 by German immigrant Henry Seipt when he established his homestead and called it The Hermitage. Seipt and his family ran the ranch as a hunting and fishing camp until 1929, when it was sold to Robert and Helen Cox. The Coxes renamed it the T Cross Ranch and made it into a dude ranch. The new name was derived from the Tau Chapter of Saint Anthony's Society, to which Robert Cox had belonged at the Massachusetts Institute of Technology, and from the cross of St. Anthony. A total of 16 log buildings comprise the historic section of the ranch. The district also includes irrigation ditches dug during the 1920s and 1930s.

The T Cross Ranch was placed on the National Register of Historic Places in 2008.
