= Delfelder Schoolhouse =

- U.S. National Register of Historic Places
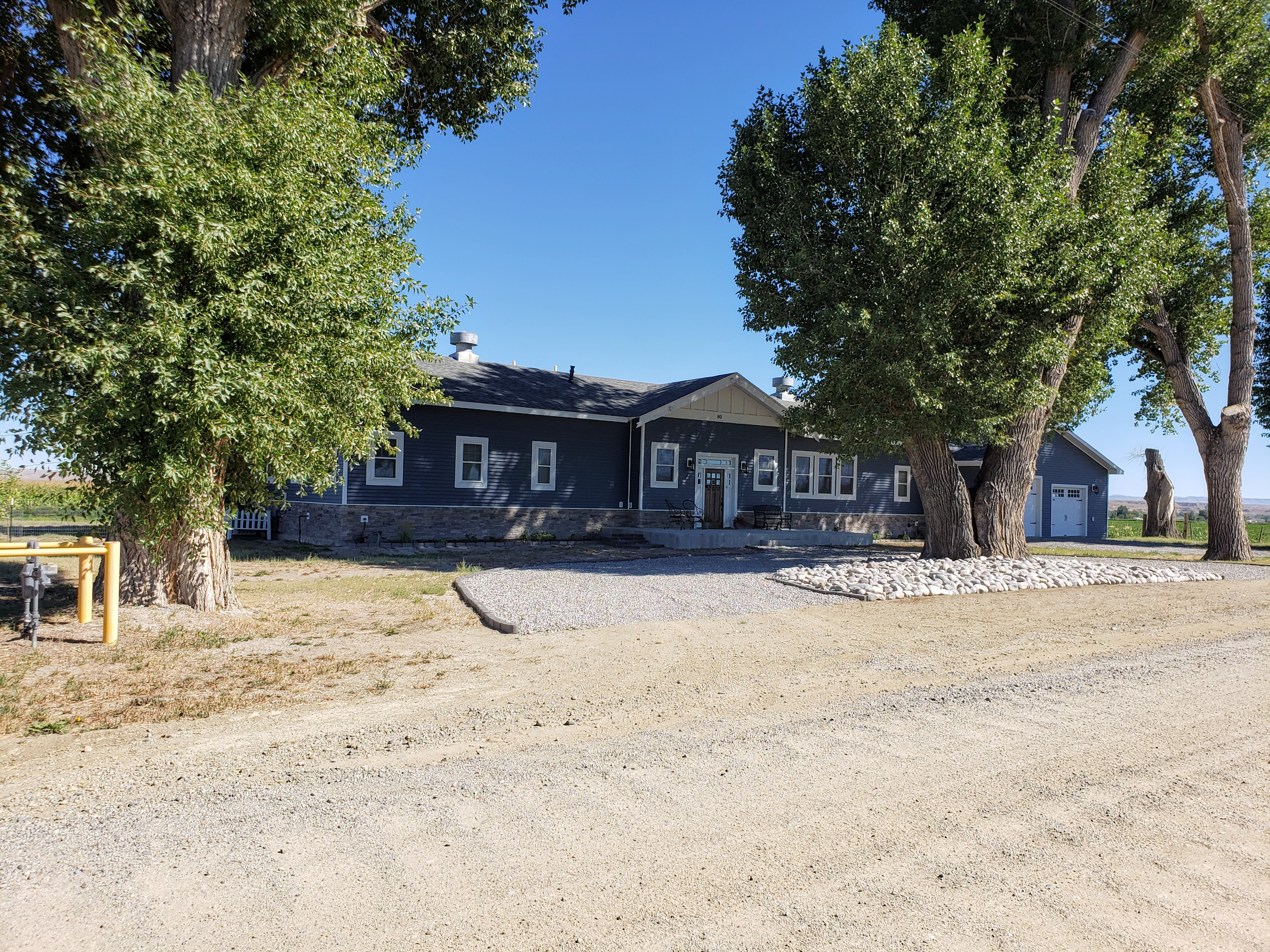

- Location within Wyoming Location within the United States
- Nearest city: Riverton, Wyoming
- Coordinates: 43°5′1″N 108°21′37″W
- Area: less than one acre
- Built: 1920
- Built by: Westerlund & Schodin
- NRHP reference No.: 78002826
- Added to NRHP: March 29, 1978

The Delfelder Schoolhouse, also known as Delfelder Hall, was built in 1920–21 on property formerly owned by Jacob Delfelder in Fremont County, Wyoming, United States. The school was the third school building on the site, intended to serve the children of residents in the remote region of the county. The school operated until 1929, when transportation became available to allow students to attend school in Riverton. After its use as a school the building became a community center. In 1940 the Delfelder Hall Association was formed to purchase and operate the building, buying it for $575 and retiring the debt in 1943.

Delfelder Hall is a one-story stucco building covered by a shallow hipped roof with deep overhangs. It measures about 82 feet (25 m) by 24.5 feet (7.5 m). The entrance is marked by a small cross gable. The interior is dominated by a large meeting space, entered through the vestibule. A kitchen occupies the south end. The original partitions between classrooms have been removed. Small additions have been appended to the east side.

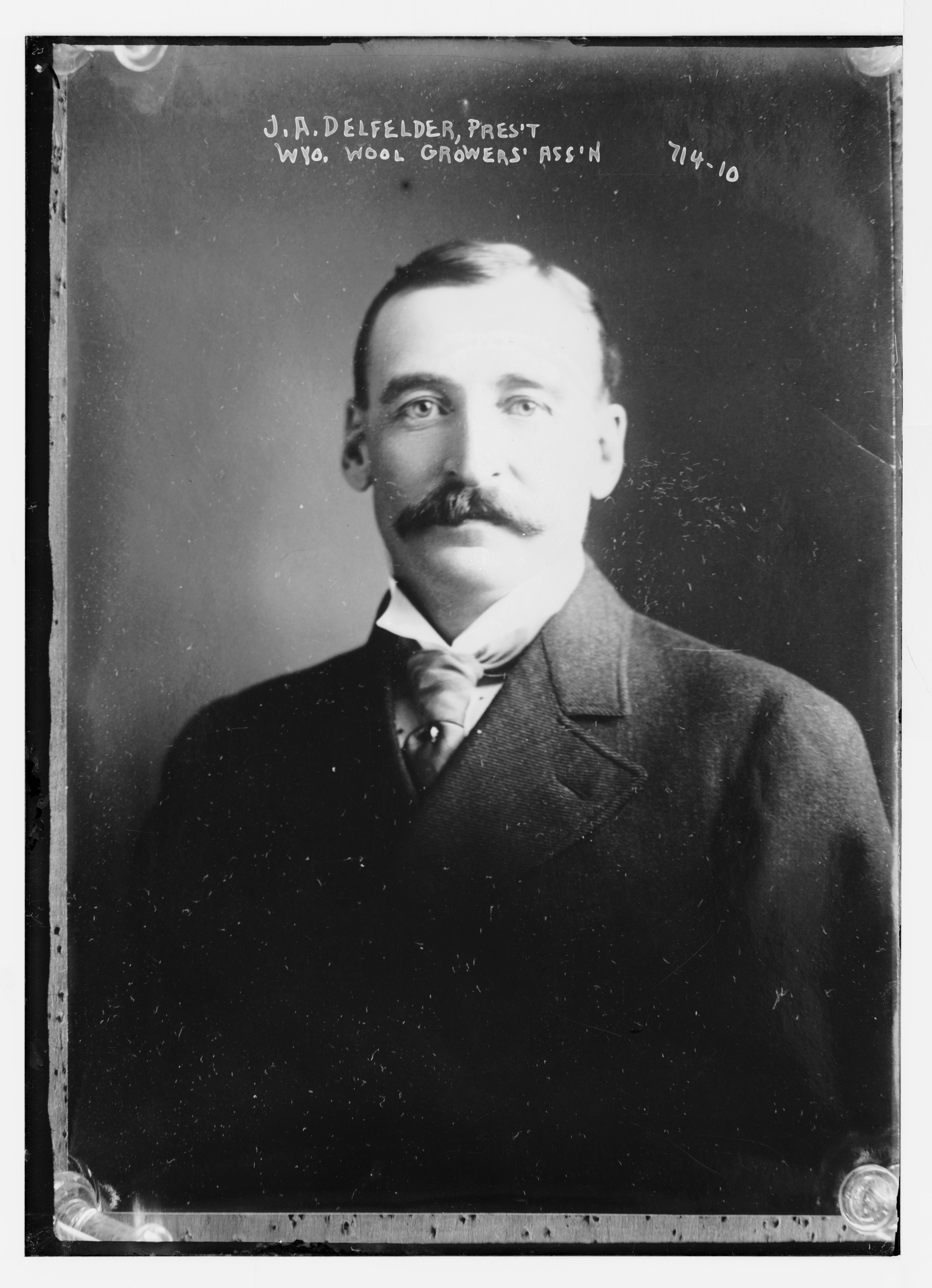
Jacob A. Delfelder c. 1909

Delfelder Hall was placed on the National Register of Historic Places on March 29, 1978.
