= Green Mountain Arrow Site =

- Green Mountain Arrow Site (48FR96)
- U.S. National Register of Historic Places
- Nearest city: Stratton Rim, Wyoming
- Area: 3 acres (1.2 ha)
- NRHP reference No.: 86000351
- Added to NRHP: March 12, 1986

The Green Mountain Arrow Site is an assemblage of arranged stones in Fremont County, Wyoming. The site includes seven stone cairns, a 50-metre (160 ft) directional arrow, three possible stone circles and lines of small stones. It is one of relatively few stone effigies found in the northern Great Plans and Rocky Mountains.

The site was placed on the National Register of Historic Places on March 12, 1986.
