= Castle Gardens Petroglyph Site =

- U.S. National Register of Historic Places
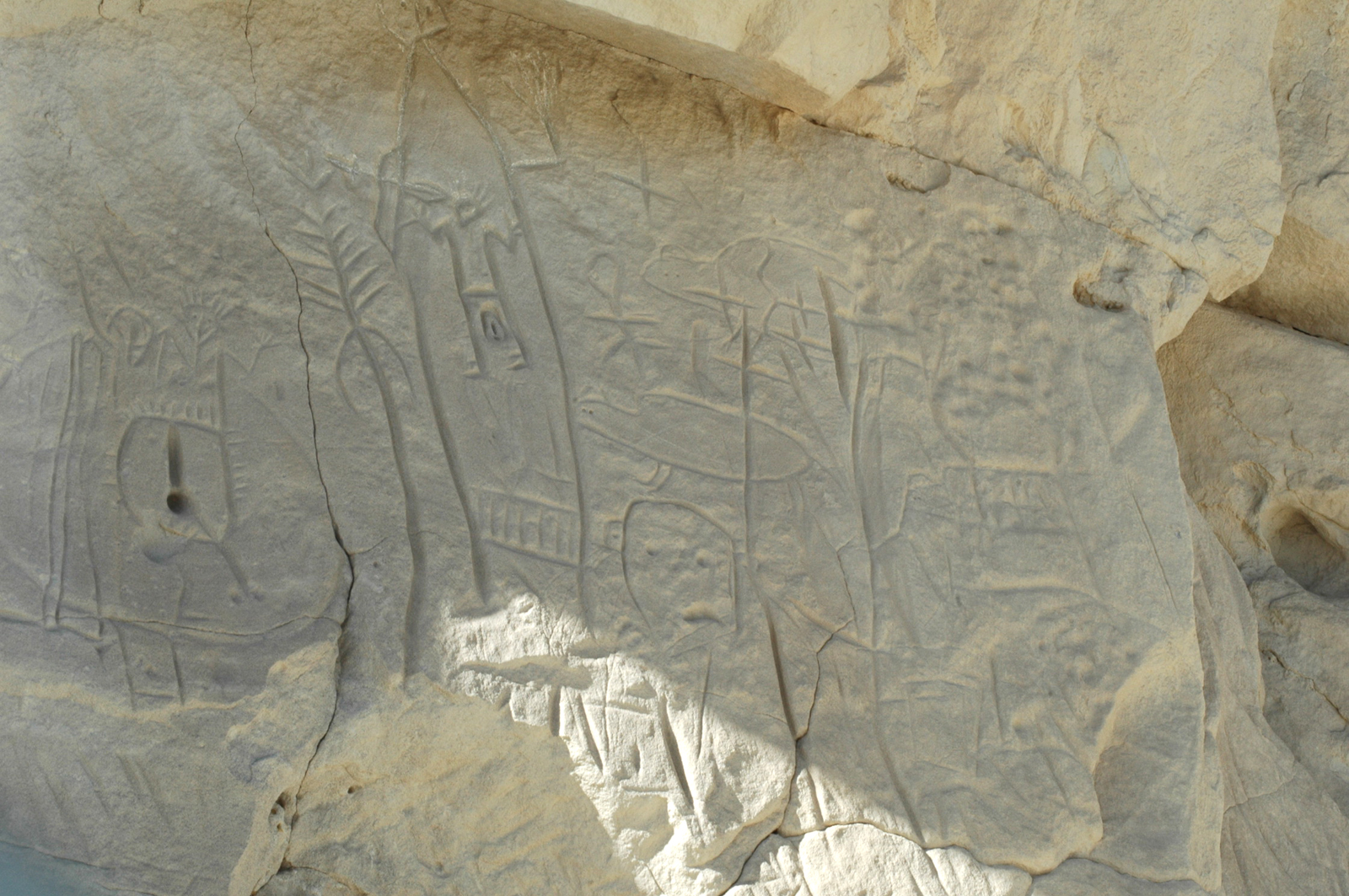

- Location within Wyoming
- Nearest city: Moneta, Wyoming
- Coordinates: 42°55′45.48″N 107°36′49.32″W
- Area: 3,840 acres (1,550 ha)
- NRHP reference No.: 69000189
- Added to NRHP: April 16, 1969

The Castle Gardens Petroglyph Site is a 6-mile (9.7 km) by 1-mile (1.6 km) region of vertical cliff faces in Fremont County, Wyoming, United States, with extensive petroglyph images incised in the rock faces. The glyphs include images of water turtles and circular shields, as well as human and animal figures. The figures with circular shields are particular to the area, and are known as Castle Gardens Shield style images. A consensus of researchers is that the figures were carved by Athabaskans related to the Navajo and Apache, some time between 1000 AD and 1250 AD. The site is being developed by the Bureau of Land Management, and may be visited.

The site was placed on the National Register of Historic Places on April 16, 1969.

== See also ==
- National Register of Historic Places listings in Fremont County, Wyoming
