= Torrey Lake Historic District =

Historic district in Wyoming, United States

- Torrey Lake Club/Ranch Historic District
- U.S. National Register of Historic Places
- U.S. Historic district
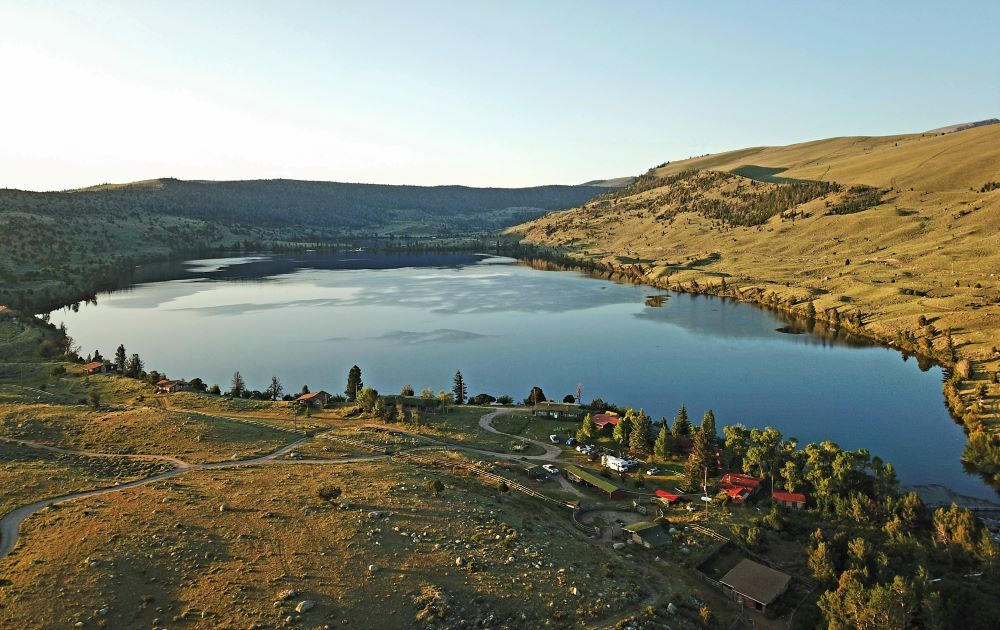

- Location within Wyoming Location within the United States
- Location: Along W shores of Lake Julia, Torrey Lake and Ring Lake, Dubois, Wyoming
- Coordinates: 43°27′38″N 109°33′21″W
- Area: 603 acres (244 ha)
- Architect: Boardman, John R.; Et al.
- Architectural style: Log
- NRHP reference No.: 91000999
- Added to NRHP: August 12, 1991

The Torrey Lake Club or Torrey Lake Ranch, also known as the Boardman Ranch or Murdock Ranch, was built as a resort in the 1920s about 8 miles (13 km) southeast of Dubois, Wyoming at an elevation of about 7,400 feet (2,300 m). The club is on about 603 acres (244 ha), centered on a complex of nine cabins, a bunkhouse for ranch hands and staff, and supporting structures. The log cabins were built by club members from local materials.

The club was established by Oklahoma businessman John R. Boardman, who came to the area in 1901 with family and friends. In 1915 Boardman bought property on Torrey Lake and homesteaded it in 1921. That year he and two partners formed the Torrey Lake Club as a resort for friends. In 1926 the club became the Torrey Lake Ranch, a working ranch on 3,000 acres (1,200 ha) owned by Boardman and partner Charles Brown Voorhis. In 1938 during the Great Depression Boardman and Voorhis divided the property between them. The area containing club structures was on Voorhis's portion of the ranch. The Voorhis property was sold in 1944, while the Boardman section remains in the Boardman family. The property remains a working cattle ranch.

The club area was listed on the National Register of Historic Places on August 12, 1991.
