= Wind River Agency Blockhouse =

- U.S. National Register of Historic Places
- Nearest city: Fort Washakie, Wyoming
- Area: less than one acre
- Built: 1871
- NRHP reference No.: 00001589
- Added to NRHP: December 23, 2000

The Wind River Agency Blockhouse, also known as the Trout Creek Blockhouse, was built in 1871 on the Wind River Indian Reservation. It is one of the oldest surviving structures in Wyoming. The blockhouse was built at the suggestion of Chief Washakie as a defensive position for the local Shoshone and non-Indians against attack by Cheyenne, Northern Arapaho and Sioux raiders. After the Wyoming Territory became more stable the structure served as a jail and as a storehouse.

The Wind River Agency Blockhouse was placed on the National Register of Historic Places on December 23, 2000.
