= Split Rock Prehistoric Site =

- U.S. National Register of Historic Places
- Nearest city: Split Rock Ranch, Wyoming
- Area: 50 acres (20 ha)
- NRHP reference No.: 87000662
- Added to NRHP: May 4, 1987

The Split Rock Archeological Site comprises a series of river terraces south of the Sweetwater River in Fremont County, Wyoming. The terraces have yielded Native American artifacts from the Early Plains Archaic Period. Several housepit features were found in 1984 excavations. The site was placed on the National Register of Historic Places on May 4, 1987.
