= Dean Decker Site =

Archeological site in Wyoming, U.S.

- Decker, Dean, Site (48FR916; 48SW541)
- U.S. National Register of Historic Places
- Nearest city: Honeycomb Buttes, Wyoming
- Area: 420 acres (170 ha)
- NRHP reference No.: 86000354
- Added to NRHP: March 12, 1986

The Dean Decker Site is an archeological site in Sweetwater and Fremont counties in Wyoming. The site extends for 6.5 kilometres (4.0 mi) along the terraces of Red Creek and Lower Sand Creek, with many Native American hearths and worked stone fragments. The site appears to have been used from the Middle Archaic Period to the Protohistoric Period. It was added to the National Register of Historic Places on March 12, 1986.
