= Mayer Halff =

American rancher (1836–1900)

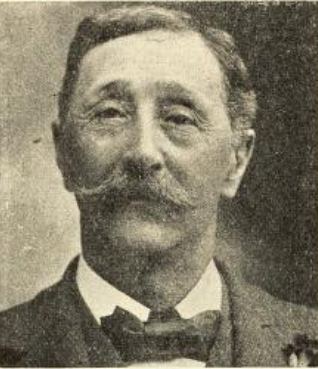
- Halff in a 1925 publication
- Born: February 7, 1836; Lauterbourg, France
- Died: December 23, 1905 (aged 69)
- Occupation: Rancher
- Spouse: Rachel Hart
- Children: 4, including Henry

Mayer Halff (February 7, 1836 – December 23, 1905) was an American rancher. He was a pioneering rancher in Texas and a prominent member of the Jewish community of that state. Mayer acquired 1,000,000 acres (400,000 ha) of ranchland in western Texas and New Mexico and at one time was the third largest cattle owner in the United States.

== Early life ==
Halff was born February 7, 1836, in Lauterbourg, Alsace, France. Halff's family was engaged in the cattle industry. In 1851, Halff immigrated to the United States, joining his brother Adolphe in Galveston, Texas. Halff was an itinerant peddler for several years in the area around Liberty, Texas. Adolphe perished in a shipwreck in 1856. In 1857, Halff's younger brother Solomon joined him in Texas and the two brothers became business partners. Solomon managed the Halff's dry good store while Mayer increasingly became involved in cattle trading. Halff became a U.S. citizen in 1860.

Halff did not serve in the Confederate States of America army during the American Civil War, but instead relocated to southern Texas and Matamoros, Mexico. His brother Solomon, drafted into the Confederate Army, was jailed for not serving, but eventually became part of a largely Jewish infantry unit. In 1864, the Halff brothers opened "M. Halff and Brother" dry goods store in San Antonio.

== Career ==
Halff began acquiring land and cattle in the 1850s. After his relocation to San Antonio in 1864, he quickly acquired a million acres of scattered ranch land west of San Antonio extending all the way to Fort Stockton, Texas, the Pecos River country, and New Mexico. After the chaos of the Civil War, 5 million longhorn cattle, many of then unclaimed by owners, ranged over western Texas and, in 1877, Halff joined other ranchers in driving thousands of cattle north from the range lands of Texas to railroads in Dodge City, Kansas, for transport to markets for beef in the eastern United States. Halff continued to drive cattle northwards, often to Colorado, until 1893.

Halff owned more than a dozen ranches in western Texas and New Mexico, including the Peña Colorado ranch near Marathon, Texas in the desert Big Bend region. The Peña Colorado was more than 100,000 acres in size. Comanche and Apache raids were still feared in the Big Bend in the 1880s and U.S. soldiers were stationed at Camp Peña Colorado on Halff land. One half of Halff's cattle in the Big Bend died during a drought from 1885 to 1887.

On a cattle drive in New Mexico in 1893, a hailstorm left Halff and his cowboys on foot after a hailstorm killed most of their horses and many of their cattle. A nearby herd of another rancher was untouched and Halff complained, "What's the matter with God Almighty? Does he kill the old Jew's cattle and not bother the gentiles?" On another occasion, one of Halff's ranch managers, Rufe Moore, traded cattle for a trainload of bacon. Halff complained, "What in the name of God would a Jew do with a trainload of hog meat?" Moore sold the bacon for a profit. Halff called him "the smartest man I've ever seen."

In 1896, the Halff brothers acquired their largest and most famous ranch, the Quien Sabe near Midland, Texas. The Quien Sabe acquired its name when a Mexican cowboy was asked the name of the ranch and answered, "Quien Sabe?" ("who knows" in Spanish). The Quien Sabe consisted of more than 300,000 acres (120,000 ha) of owned and leased land. The Quien Sabe was one of the last of giant open range ranches of Texas. One year the Halff ranches branded 35,000 calves, making Halff the third largest owner of cattle in the United States.

== Personal life and death ==
Halff married Rachel Hart on September 2, 1866. The couple had four children who lived beyond infancy. Halff died on December 23, 1905, aged 69, of "an abscess of the prostate." His son Henry inherited the ranches.
