= High Rise Village =

- U.S. National Register of Historic Places
- NRHP reference No.: 13000542
- Added to NRHP: July 23, 2013

High Rise Village is a high-elevation archeological site in Fremont County, Wyoming. Discovered in 2006 in the Wind River Range in Shoshone National Forest, the location features almost sixty lodge pads and has yielded more than 30,000 artifacts from the Archaic to the Protohistoric Period, a period of over 2500 years. The site is at 3,500 metres (11,500 ft) elevation and represents a major discovery of prehistoric occupation of high elevation zones, which had previously been neglected in archeological studies in the Western United States. High Rise Village and other similar locations share an association with stands of whitebark pines, an abundant food source.

High Rise Village was placed on the National Register of Historic Places on July 23, 2013.
