= Atlantic City Mercantile =

- U.S. National Register of Historic Places
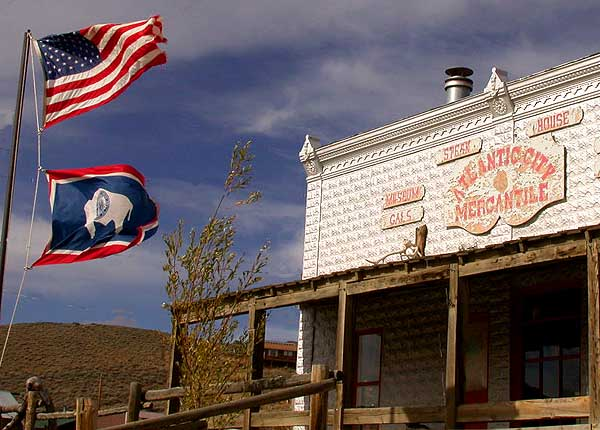

- Location within Wyoming Location within the United States
- Location: Rt. 62, Box 260, Atlantic City, Wyoming
- Coordinates: 42°29′15″N 108°43′47″W
- Area: 0.5 acres (0.20 ha)
- Built: 1893
- NRHP reference No.: 85000869
- Added to NRHP: April 25, 1985

Atlantic City Mercantile is a former store now used as a bar and restaurant in Atlantic City, Wyoming. It is one of the chief buildings in the small mining town in the South Pass area of Wyoming, and is a significant example of a late 19th-century commercial building on what had recently been the frontier.

== History ==
The store was built in 1893 by Lawrence Geissler, a 38-year-old German immigrant who had arrived in Wyoming at the age of 18 to work as a cowboy. In 1889 he married Emma Stegmiller in South Pass City. The couple opened a store in Atlantic City the following year on land owned by Emile Granier, a mining speculator who owned most of the land in Atlantic City. Geissler bought the property from Granier in 1900 for five dollars. The store served as the town's telephone exchange and post office. It closed after Geissler's death in 1929. It was reopened as a tavern in 1964 by Lyle F. Moerer, who retained the name and appearance of the store. It was sold in 1971 to Terry Weirman, and again in 1977 to Robert Rice. The establishment has been profiled in a variety of media, including National Geographic and Esquire.

== Description ==
Atlantic City Mercantile is built from adobe blocks covered with tin siding, with a false front on the south side of the building. The interior walls and ceilings are also covered with tin. The one-story building stands on a stone foundation with a full basement. It is roofed with a gabled roof hidden by the false front. The building's principal characteristic is its front facade, with large display windows and a formed metal cornice.

The Mercantile is the oldest surviving building in Atlantic City, with the exception of Hyde's Hall. It was placed on the National Register of Historic Places on April 25, 1985.
