= Torrey Lake Petroglyph District =

- U.S. National Register of Historic Places
- U.S. Historic district
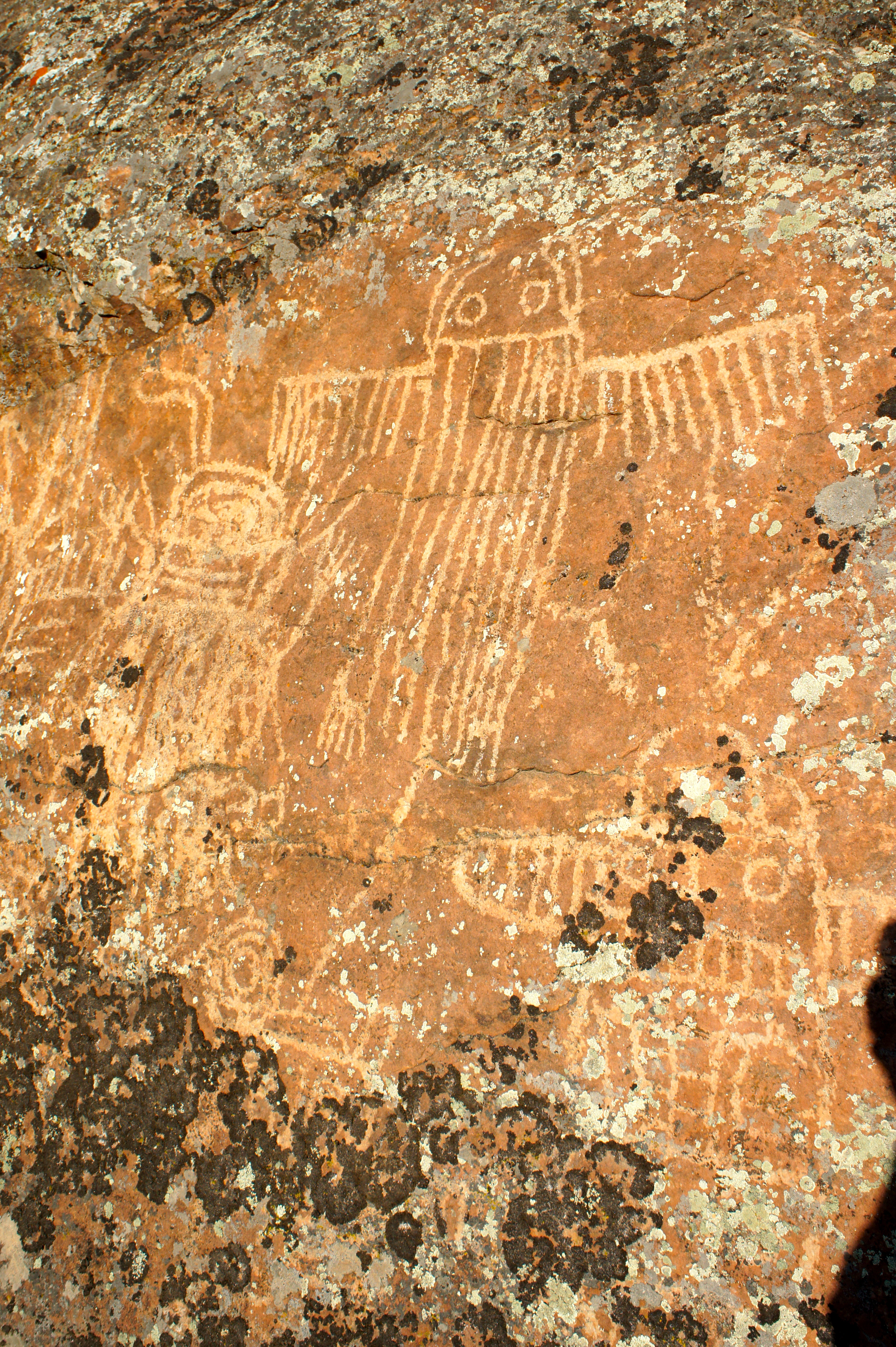
- Nearest city: Dubois, Wyoming
- Area: 1,620 acres (660 ha)
- NRHP reference No.: 93000983
- Added to NRHP: October 4, 1993

The Torrey Lake Petroglyph District extends for about 3.2 miles (5.1 km) along Torrey Creek in Fremont County, Wyoming. The site includes about 175 petroglyphs, as well as eleven lithic scatters and a sheep trap. The petroglyphs are in the Interior Line Style, or Dinwoody style, consistent with other rock art in central Wyoming. Site investigations have uncovered a number of petroglyphs that had previously been hidden under lichen. The site was placed on the National Register of Historic Places on October 4, 1993.
