= Helen Lookingbill Site =

- U.S. National Register of Historic Places
- NRHP reference No.: 13000102
- Added to NRHP: March 30, 2013

The Helen Lookingbill Site is a prehistoric campsite in the Absaroka Range of Fremont County, Wyoming. Occupied over 12,500 years, the site has yielded more than 125,000 artifacts, including a large quantity of Early Plains Archaic side-notched points. The site has been assessed as a tool production location.

The site was placed on the National Register of Historic Places on March 30, 2013.
