= Miner's Delight, Wyoming =

Ghost town in Wyoming, United States

- Hamilton City
- U.S. National Register of Historic Places
- U.S. Historic district
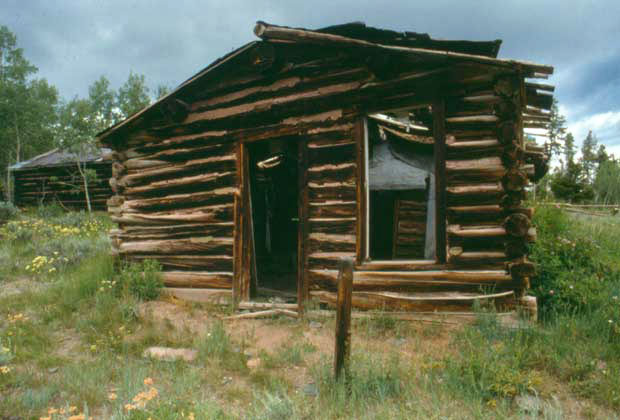
- An abandoned cabin in the ghost town at Miner's Delight

- Location within Wyoming Location within the United States
- Location: Fremont County, Wyoming, NE of Atlantic City
- Nearest city: Atlantic City, Wyoming
- Coordinates: 42°31′59″N 108°40′50″W
- NRHP reference No.: 80004047
- Added to NRHP: June 4, 1980

Hamilton City, or Miner's Delight as it was commonly known, was a town in Fremont County, Wyoming, United States, on the southeastern tip of the Wind River Range, that prospered during the mining boom in the American West in the second half of the 19th century. It was a "sister city" of Atlantic City and South Pass City. Today a few buildings still stand as a reminder of an era in Wyoming's past history.

Miner's Delight went through several boom-bust periods, as many western mining towns did, with corresponding rises and declines in its population. Gold was discovered there in 1868, and by 1870, at the height of the mine's operations, the population in Hamilton City was 75, forty of whom were miners. The original boom of mining activity "busted", however, from 1872 to 1874, but by the 1880s a new era of economic prosperity had dawned. Smaller booms occurred in 1907 and in 1910, and then again during the Great Depression. The town was inhabited as late as 1960. As of 2015, there were no residents in the town.

== History ==
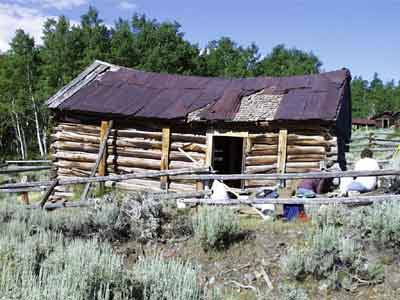
The Bureau of Land Management has worked toward the preservation of the ruins of Miner's Delight.

=== Boom or bust, 1868–1910 ===
The Miners Delight mine, discovered by Jonathan Pugh, was located about a quarter mile west of the town then known as Hamilton City. Boom and bust periods followed, and in March 1882, the mine was completely shut down and not used again until after the turn of the 20th century. The two brief boom periods in 1907 and in 1910, were in relation to mining operations.

A famous incident involving Miner's Delight occurred there in March 1893, which was widely covered in the press at the time in Cheyenne and throughout Wyoming, and came to be known as "the brass lock service mystery". Miner's Delight postmaster, James "Jimmy" Kime had attempted to ship eight registered letters via the Rawlins and Northwestern's line's Lander-to-Rawlins stagecoach to the Postmaster in Rawlins using the "brass lock service". The Post Office's so-called "brass lock service" utilized canvas pouches, which were locked with brass locks, with the only persons having a key being the Postmasters along the stage line. When Kime's pouch reached its destination in Rawlins some 120 miles to the southeast, however, the postmaster there discovered that someone had cut the pouch and stolen all the registered letters.

For many months, U.S. Postal inspectors investigated the matter, and a number of other related thefts of various valuables on the line from the locked pouches, before finally arresting Postmaster John Gatlin of the Myersville Station near today's Jeffrey City, Wyoming, along with his wife Stella. The trials of the couple in Laramie City went on into the Fall of 1893, when charges against John Gatlin were finally dropped, after Stella Gatlin confessed to stealing the items, due to what she claimed to be her illness of kleptomania. Her affidavit stated that she had struggled for years to overcome the mania, while keeping it a secret from her husband. On November 25, 1893, the jury found Mrs. Gatlin guilty. Two days later, she was taken to the Laramie Prison, where she was registered as Prisoner #150, the first woman to be imprisoned there after being convicted of a federal crime in Wyoming. She was released early in December 1894, based on her "good conduct", and following her departure, prison officials added a special new wing exclusively for women, with individual cells and a toilet.

=== The Ghost Town of Miner's Delight today ===
Today, through historic preservation by the Bureau of Land Management and various university programs and courses, on the ghost town at Miner's Delight are seventeen structures, including: seven cabins, one saloon, one meat house, one shop or barn, one shaft house, one pantry, one cellar, three privies, and a corral. All of the buildings are constructed of logs or unfinished lumber.

Miner's Delight was added to the National Register of Historic Places on June 4, 1980.

=== History of the town's name ===
The town's nomenclature, and how it ended up being called "Miner's Delight" instead of "Hamilton City", is a topic of historical debate. There are generally two stories associated with the changing of the town's name. Both stories involve the discovery of a golden lode, a miner's delight, on the ridge above town.

The first story holds that in 1869, a man named William Jones, while chasing his cows about a pasture, stumbled across some quartz with gold flecks dotting it. The site was so remote and so far above town, that he erroneously assumed no one else would ever find it. Contented, he continued on his way, gathering his stray cattle. When he returned later to the site of the gold lode, however, he found others working the claim. He tried to relate his tale of the discovery to the other miners, but they would have none of it, and ran him off.

The other story does not have quite the same Old West flair as the tale of Jones' would-be discovery. A man named Johnathan Pugh, who incidentally is listed as one of the original founders of the lode, claimed to have discovered the gold. He even described the quartz ridge above town, down to the gold nuggets embedded in it.

== Highways ==
- The road west out of Miner's Delight intersects with WYO 28 four miles west of town; Wyo. 28 intersects with US 287 thirty miles north of that intersection.
