= Diamond A Ranch (Dubois, Wyoming) =

- U.S. National Register of Historic Places
- U.S. Historic district
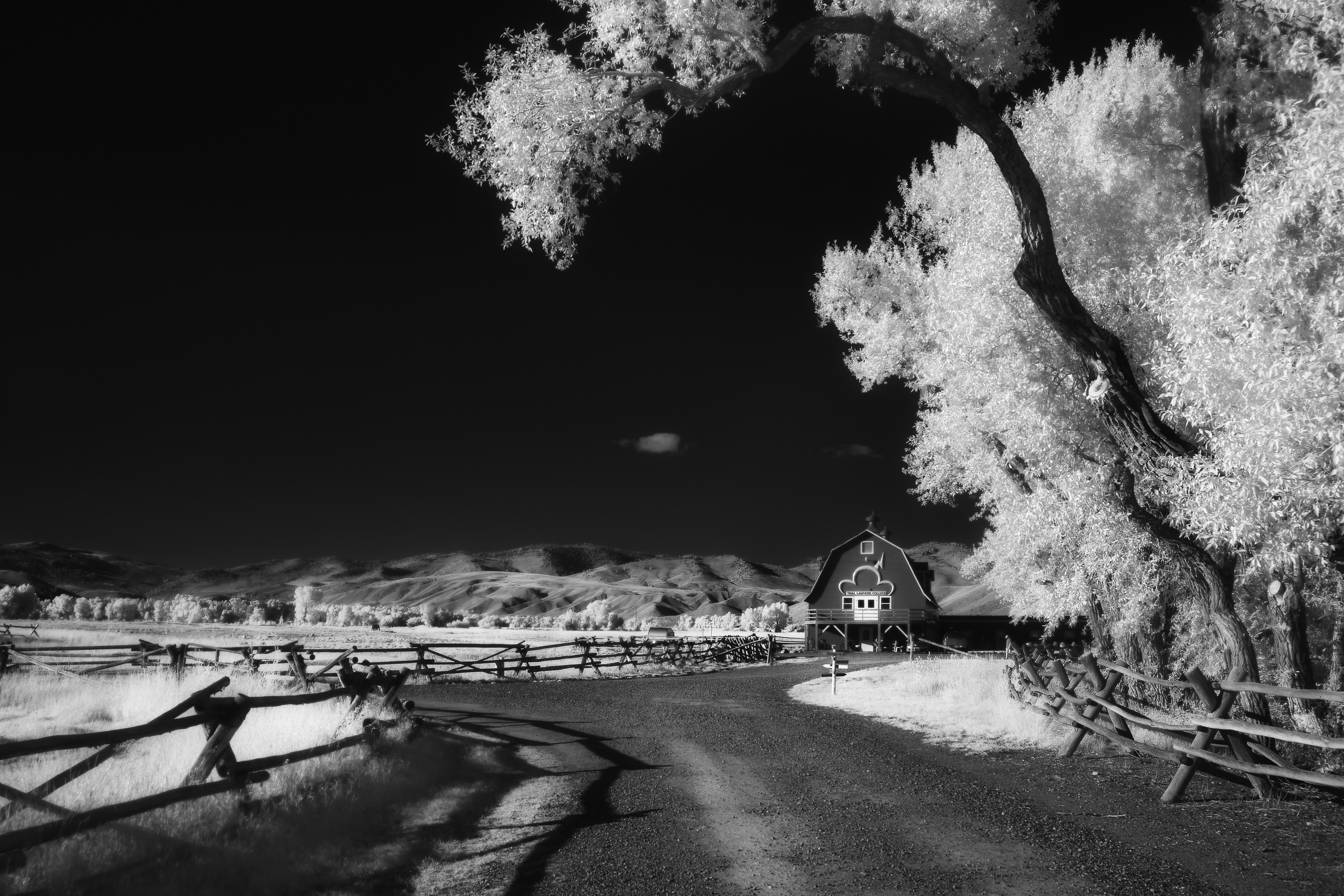

- Location within Wyoming Location within the United States
- Nearest city: Dubois, Wyoming
- Coordinates: 43°28′43″N 109°30′09″W
- Area: 6.1 acres (2.5 ha)
- Built: 1891
- Built by: David Williamson, others
- Architectural style: Vernacular log and stone
- MPS: Pioneer Ranches/Farms in Fremont County MPS
- NRHP reference No.: 91001026
- Added to NRHP: August 19, 1991

The Diamond A Ranch, or Spring Ranch, is a ranch in the upper Wind River valley of Fremont County, Wyoming. The site was first settled by John Robert McDonald, a Scottish immigrant who had a 160-acre (65 ha) homestead on the site in 1891. McDonald sold the property to John Williamson in 1907. Jack Williamson and his brother David were Scots as well, working as stonemasons. The Williamsons had worked in New York City, at Princeton University, at the Mormon Temple in Salt Lake City and on bridge work for the Union Pacific Railroad. In 1888 they came from Salt Lake City to Lander, where they worked on a number of projects, as well as in Rawlins and at Fort Washakie. They joined their sister Jean Williamson Sinclair at the Upper Circle Ranch near Dubois in the early 1890s. David Williamson married Annie McKenzie, a friend of his sister's who had come with her from Scotland. When Jack died of tick fever in 1916, David moved to the ranch with his family. After David's death in 1934, his wife Annie operated the ranch until she sold it in 1966. The ranch is notable as one of several ranches established by Scottish immigrants.

The ranch includes 14 buildings of frame, log or stone construction. The main ranch house was built starting in 1903, initially in stone and later in log. Despite the professional abilities of the Williamsons, it was built by a local stonemason. Other buildings include poultry houses, an outhouse, a bunkhouse, a granary, a calf shed, a garage and the homestead cabin. There are also a number of barns and livestock sheds.

The Diamond A Ranch was placed on the National Register of Historic Places on August 19, 1991.
