= Welty's General Store =

- U.S. National Register of Historic Places
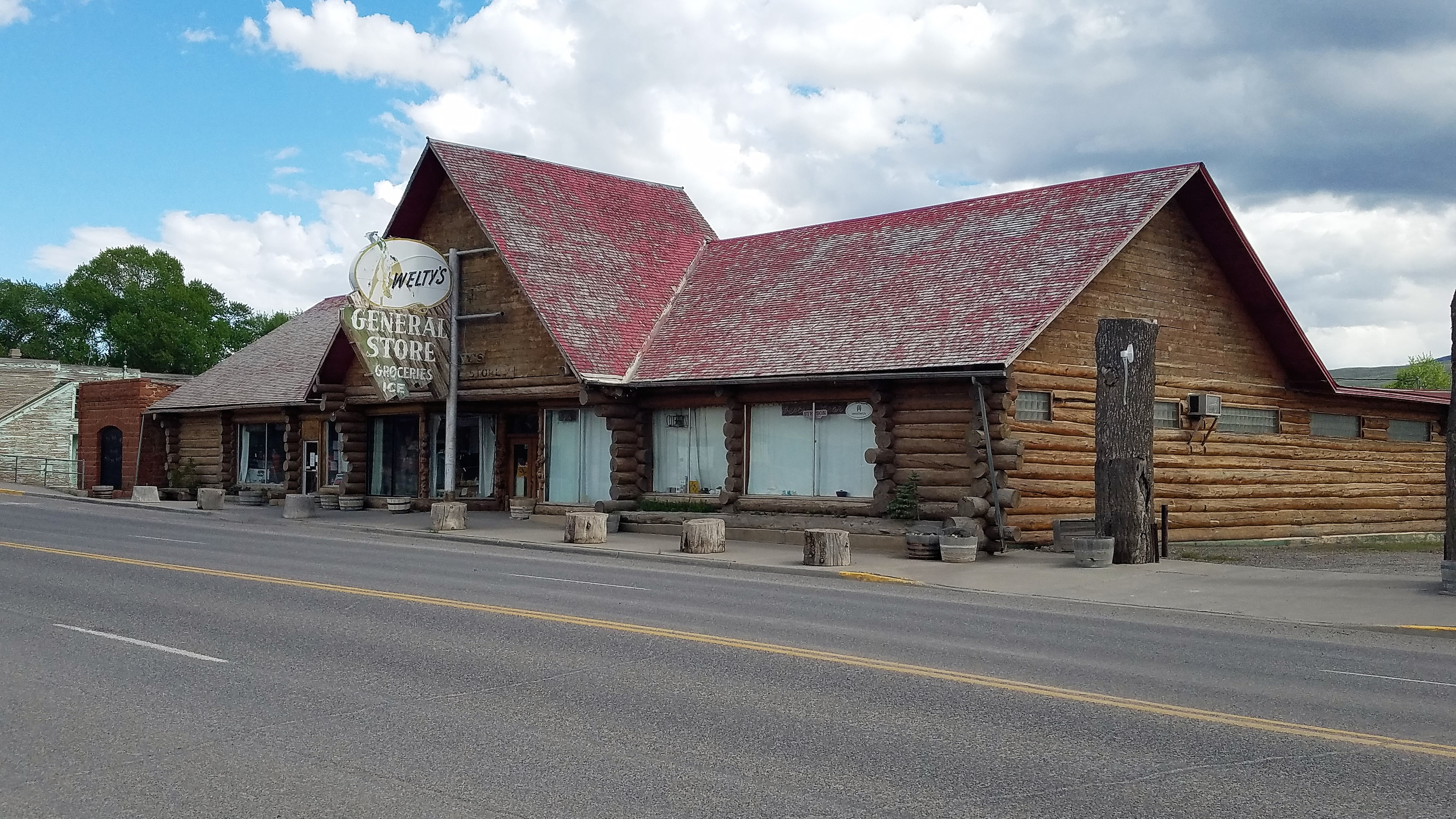

- Location within Wyoming Location within the United States
- Location: 220 Ramshorn St., Dubois, Wyoming
- Coordinates: 43°32′1″N 109°37′59″W
- Built: 1889
- Architect: Welty, Francis A., I; Et al.
- NRHP reference No.: 79003680
- Added to NRHP: November 15, 1979

Welty's General Store is a store in Dubois, Wyoming.

Welty's was first established in 1889 in a log cabin just outside of the town, by Frank A. Welty. The store was placed next to the homestead cabin of his father, Dr. Francis Welty. In 1897 George Hays and Huey Yeomans built a general store in Dubois. Welty purchased the store in 1898 and moved his operation into town, dismantling the first building and appending it to the new store. Both buildings were of log construction with an earth roof.

An addition was built in 1915 out to the street. In 1922 more frontage was added, with a log portico at the entrance. Further additions in the 1950s expanded the wings to provide more sales space. A steeply pitched log-framed roof was added to the front at this time, while the sod-roofed portions remained.

Welty's was a general mercantile store, providing a broad range of merchandise to an isolated community. It also provided other services, functioning as the post office and Dr. Welty's medical office until Dr. Welty's death in 1919. Welty's was a John Deere dealer and stocked farm and ranch supplies. After his death the store was operated by his son Frank A. Welty Jr.

The store was listed on the National Register of Historic Places in 1979. It is operated by the founder's grandson Frank A. Welty III.
