= Atlantic City, Wyoming =

Census-designated place in Fremont County, Wyoming, United States

- Census-designated place
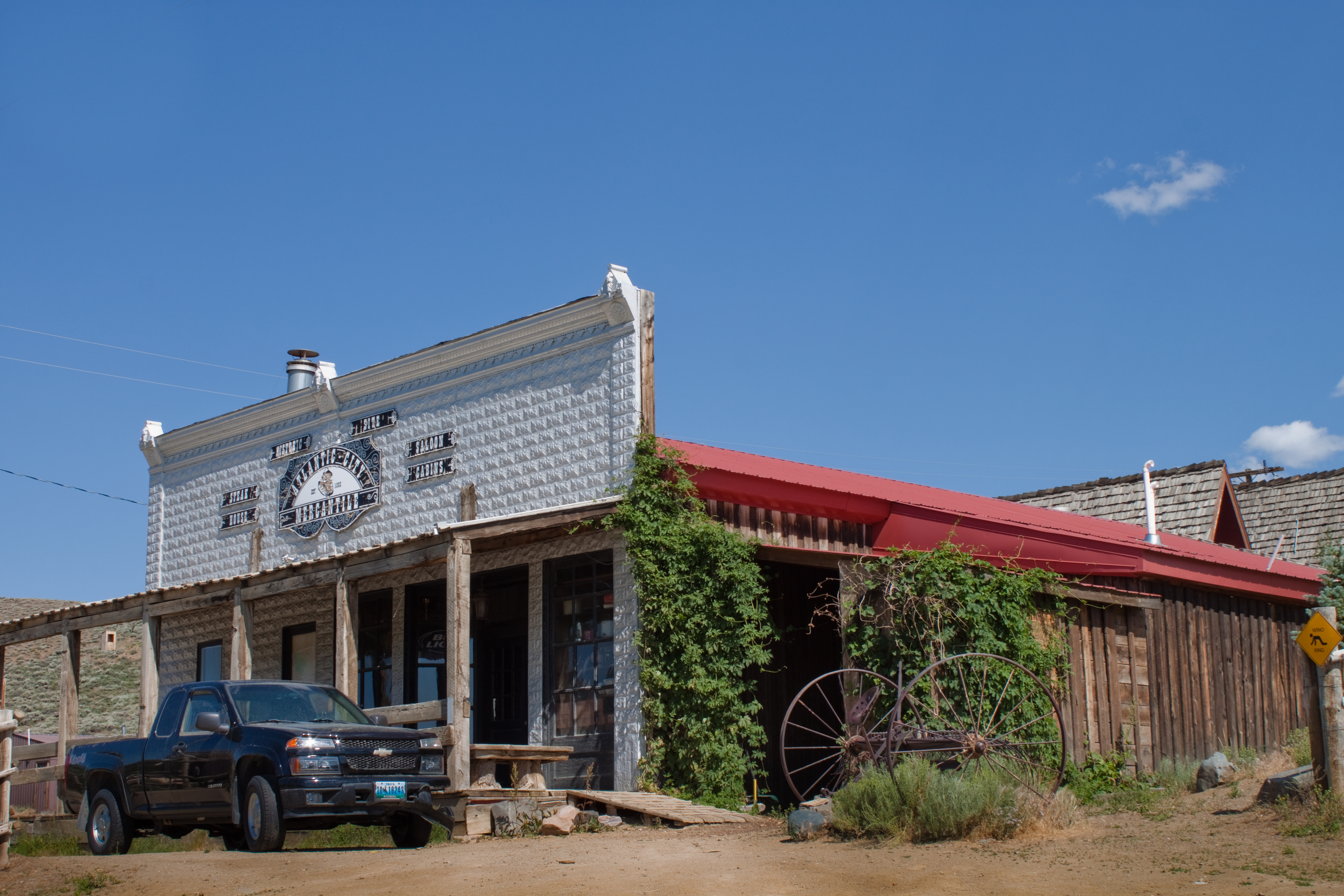
- Atlantic City Mercantile, 2011

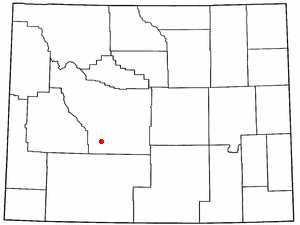
- Location of Atlantic City, Wyoming
- Coordinates: 42°29′43″N 108°45′08″W
- Country: United States
- State: Wyoming
- County: Fremont

Area
  - Total: 7.8 sq mi (20 km^{2})
  - Land: 7.8 sq mi (20 km^{2})
  - Water: 0.0 sq mi (0 km^{2})
- Elevation: 7,694 ft (2,345 m)

Population (2010)
  - Total: 37
  - Density: 4.7/sq mi (1.8/km^{2})
- Time zone: UTC-7 (Mountain (MST))
  - Summer (DST): UTC-6 (MDT)
- ZIP code: 82520
- Area code: 307
- FIPS code: 56-04015
- GNIS feature ID: 2407777

Atlantic City is a census-designated place (CDP) in Fremont County, Wyoming, United States. The population was 37 at the 2010 census. The community is a small mining settlement in a gulch near South Pass in southwestern Wyoming. It was founded in 1868 as a mining camp following the 1867 gold rush in the region. The "Atlantic" name refers to its location on the eastern side of the nearby Continental Divide. The town declined following the end of the placer gold rush in the early 1870s, but continued to exist as advances in mining technology allowed further extraction of gold. From the 1960s until 1983, it was the location of a US Steel iron ore mine. The town is accessible by gravel roads from nearby Wyoming Highway 28.

The town today has rustic flavor, with a small cluster of residences and the preserved Atlantic City Mercantile store and restaurant along the main road through town. It attracts a small number of tourists in the summer as well.

== Demographics ==
As of the census of 2000, there were 39 people, 23 households, and 8 families residing in the CDP. The population density was 1.9 people per square mile (0.7/km^{2}). There were 99 housing units at an average density of 4.7/sq mi (1.8/km^{2}). The racial makeup of the CDP was 94.87% White and 5.13% Native American. Hispanic or Latino of any race were 2.56% of the population.

There were 23 households, out of which 13.0% had children under the age of 18 living with them, 30.4% were married couples living together, and 65.2% were non-families. 52.2% of all households were made up of individuals, and 4.3% had someone living alone who was 65 years of age or older. The average household size was 1.70 and the average family size was 2.50.

In the CDP, the population was spread out, with 12.8% under the age of 18, 7.7% from 25 to 44, 76.9% from 45 to 64, and 2.6% who were 65 years of age or older. The median age was 48 years. For every 100 females, there were 129.4 males. For every 100 females age 18 and over, there were 126.7 males.

The median income for a household in the CDP was $21,094, and the median income for a family was $48,750. Males had a median income of $21,250 versus $28,750 for females. The per capita income for the CDP was $15,756. There were no families and 21.9% of the population living below the poverty line, including no under eighteens and 100.0% of those over 64.

== Geography ==
According to the United States Census Bureau, the CDP has a total area of 7.8 square miles (20.2 km^{2}), all land.

=== Climate ===
According to the Köppen Climate Classification system, Atlantic City has a semi-arid climate, abbreviated "BSk" on climate maps.

Climate data for Atlantic City, Wyoming, 1991–2020 normals, extremes 1897–present: 7821ft (2384m)
Month	Jan	Feb	Mar	Apr	May	Jun	Jul	Aug	Sep	Oct	Nov	Dec	Year
Record high °F (°C)	46 (8)	46 (8)	60 (16)	69 (21)	81 (27)	88 (31)	92 (33)	91 (33)	87 (31)	75 (24)	64 (18)	52 (11)	92 (33)
Mean maximum °F (°C)	41.5 (5.3)	42.6 (5.9)	51.8 (11.0)	65.0 (18.3)	73.6 (23.1)	81.8 (27.7)	85.4 (29.7)	84.1 (28.9)	81.0 (27.2)	66.5 (19.2)	55.0 (12.8)	42.8 (6.0)	86.3 (30.2)
Mean daily maximum °F (°C)	29.5 (−1.4)	31.3 (−0.4)	38.1 (3.4)	46.2 (7.9)	56.6 (13.7)	68.8 (20.4)	77.9 (25.5)	75.7 (24.3)	66.5 (19.2)	52.0 (11.1)	37.5 (3.1)	28.7 (−1.8)	50.7 (10.4)
Daily mean °F (°C)	15.4 (−9.2)	19.2 (−7.1)	25.7 (−3.5)	33.6 (0.9)	42.7 (5.9)	53.0 (11.7)	60.6 (15.9)	58.9 (14.9)	49.8 (9.9)	37.4 (3.0)	25.0 (−3.9)	16.7 (−8.5)	36.5 (2.5)
Mean daily minimum °F (°C)	1.2 (−17.1)	7.1 (−13.8)	13.3 (−10.4)	20.9 (−6.2)	28.8 (−1.8)	37.2 (2.9)	43.2 (6.2)	42.0 (5.6)	33.1 (0.6)	22.7 (−5.2)	12.4 (−10.9)	4.7 (−15.2)	22.2 (−5.4)
Mean minimum °F (°C)	−20.6 (−29.2)	−20.4 (−29.1)	−8.1 (−22.3)	−0.1 (−17.8)	15.5 (−9.2)	24.6 (−4.1)	31.3 (−0.4)	31.4 (−0.3)	22.3 (−5.4)	1.3 (−17.1)	−9.5 (−23.1)	−20.5 (−29.2)	−25.6 (−32.0)
Record low °F (°C)	−29 (−34)	−31 (−35)	−22 (−30)	−9 (−23)	10 (−12)	20 (−7)	26 (−3)	25 (−4)	8 (−13)	−20 (−29)	−26 (−32)	−36 (−38)	−36 (−38)
Average precipitation inches (mm)	0.96 (24)	1.49 (38)	1.62 (41)	1.89 (48)	2.60 (66)	1.55 (39)	0.82 (21)	1.05 (27)	1.31 (33)	1.55 (39)	1.58 (40)	1.46 (37)	17.88 (453)
Average snowfall inches (cm)	14.9 (38)	23.6 (60)	22.4 (57)	24.1 (61)	8.7 (22)	0.0 (0.0)	0.0 (0.0)	0.0 (0.0)	2.9 (7.4)	6.0 (15)	12.8 (33)	19.7 (50)	135.1 (343.4)
Source 1: NOAA
Source 2: XMACIS2 (2013-2020 snowfall, records & monthly max/mins)

== Education ==
Public education in the community of Atlantic City is provided by Fremont County School District #1.

== Popular culture ==
In The Outlaw Trail: A Journey Through Time, Robert Redford states, "There is only one hub of activity in Atlantic City. It is the Mercantile, a combination bar and general store where one can get any supplies needed to survive or thrive."

== Gallery ==
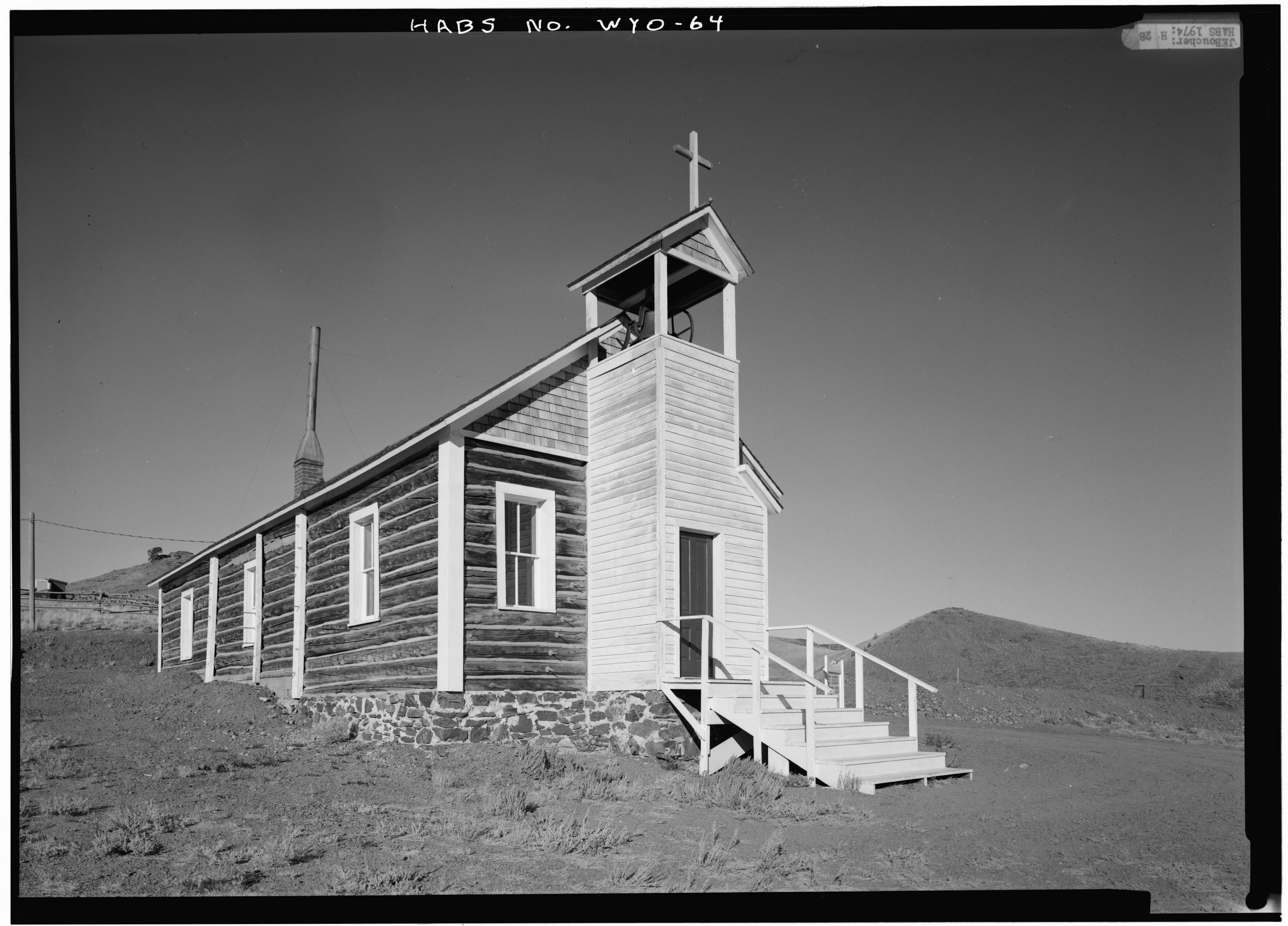
St. Andrew's Episcopal Church, Atlantic City, 1974

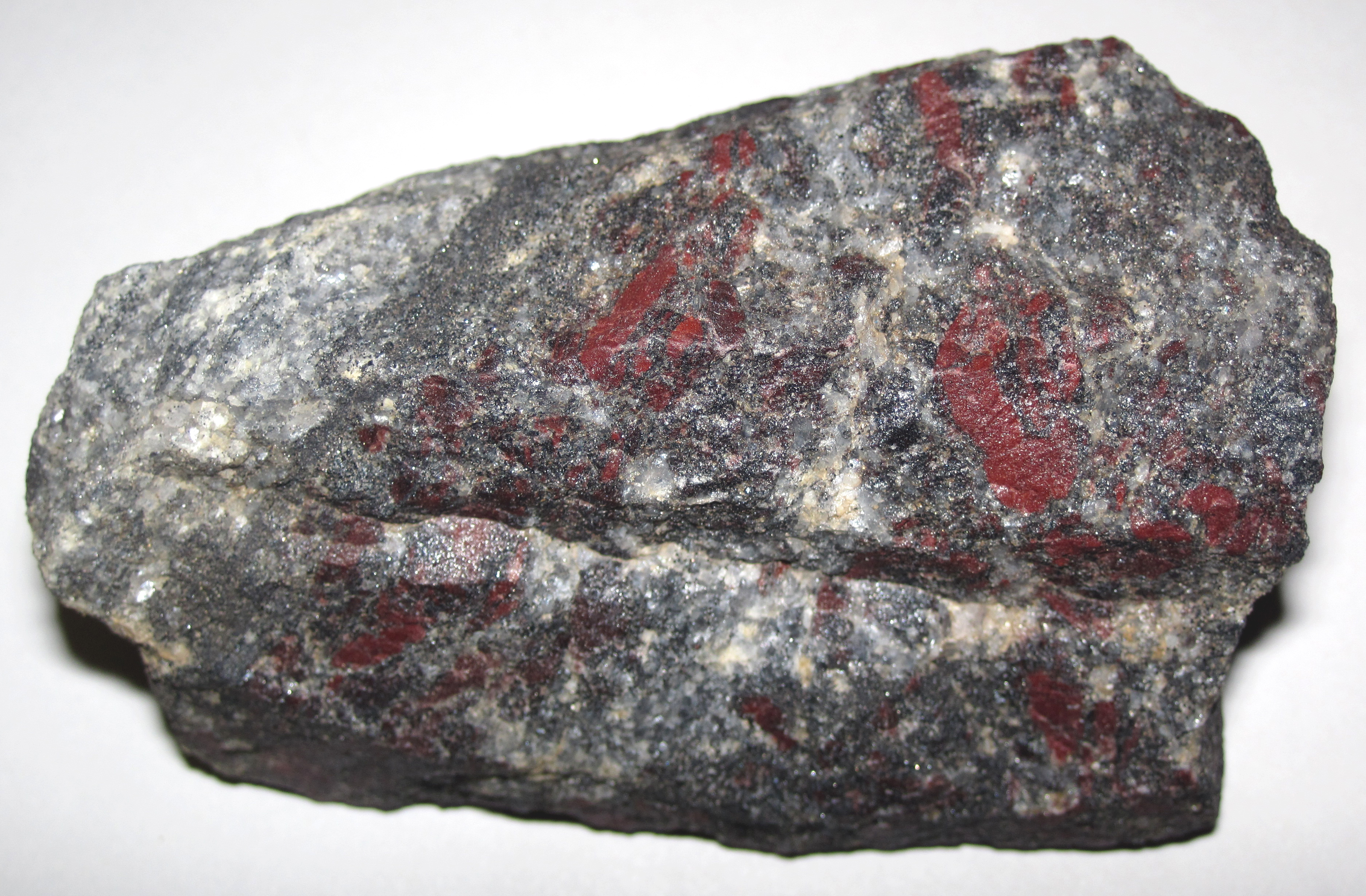
Iron ore sample from the Atlantic City iron mine

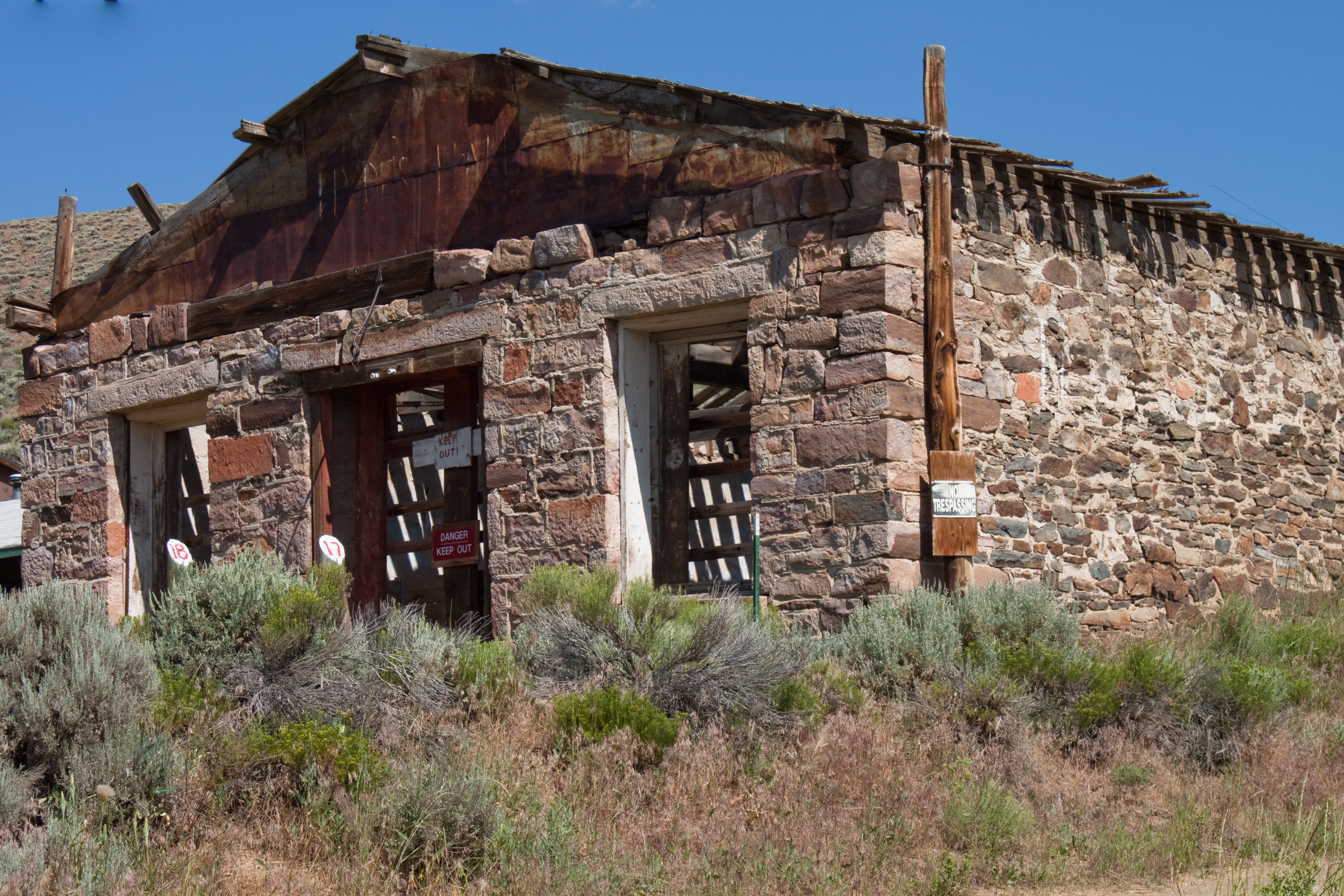
Abandoned building

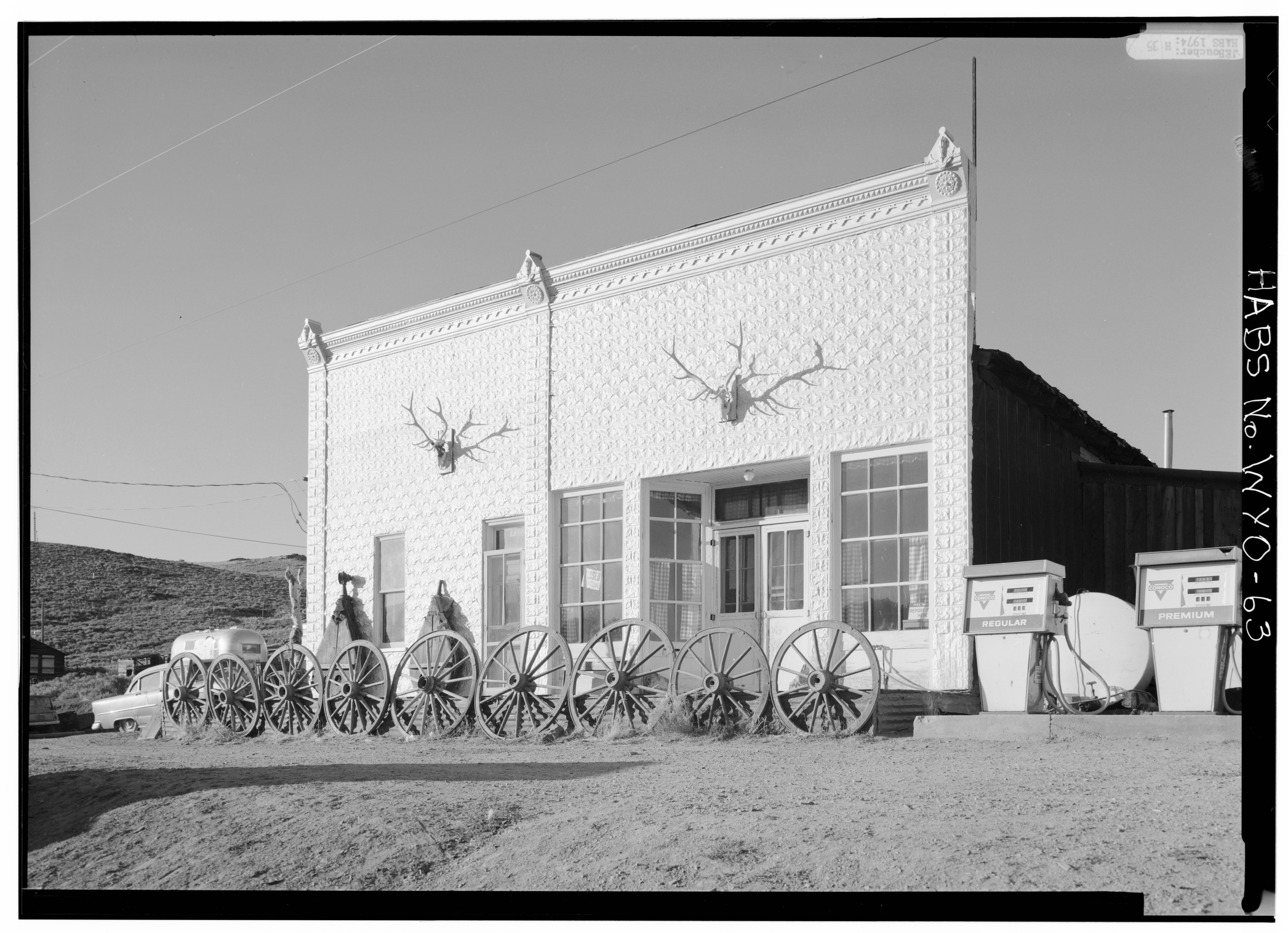
Mercantile Bar in 1974

== See also ==
- List of census-designated places in Wyoming
- Miner's Delight, Wyoming – ghost town in Atlantic City−South Pass mining district
- South Pass City, Wyoming – ghost town in mining district
