= Quien Sabe Ranch =

- U.S. National Register of Historic Places
- U.S. Historic district
- Location within Wyoming Location within the United States
- Nearest city: Shoshoni, Wyoming
- Coordinates: 43°23′40″N 107°59′35″W
- Area: 2.2 acres (0.89 ha)
- Architectural style: Vernacular log
- MPS: Pioneer Ranches/Farms in Fremont County MPS
- NRHP reference No.: 91000434
- Added to NRHP: April 18, 1991

Quien Sabe Ranch is a ranch in Fremont County, Wyoming, about 18 miles (29 km) northeast of Shoshoni. The ranch structures date to the 1880s, part of a ranching operation established around 1883 by three English immigrants: Harry Jevons, Richard Ashworth and Richard Berry. The ranch centered on an area next to Hoodoo Creek. At first the ranch was called Hoodoo ranch, but after an altercation with Mexican caballeros who lived in the neighborhood the ranch became known as "Quien Sabe" ("who knows?") for the evasive answers given by the Mexicans to the English ranchers. After a series of transactions between the partners the property was deeded to Ashworth by Jevons to secure a $4747.62 loan. Jevons killed himself after losing his money gambling in Meeteetse.

The main building is the log ranchhouse, measuring 57 feet (17 m) by 17.5 feet (5.3 m). The low-pitched roof is waterproofed with bentonite clay. Other buildings include a bunkhouse, an icehouse, a blacksmith shop and a dugout.

The ranch is associated in oral tradition with Butch Cassidy, who was supposed to have had an interest in the land in the 1890s, but no records apart from an account by Cassidy's sister Lulu Parker Betensen attest to this. The ranch was acquired by Emil Thoren in 1907, whose family kept it through much of the 20th century.

Quien Sabe Ranch was placed on the National Register of Historic Places on April 18, 1991.
