= Brooks Lake Lodge =

- U.S. National Register of Historic Places

- Location within Wyoming Location within the United States
- Nearest city: Dubois, Wyoming
- Coordinates: 43°44′47″N 110°00′23″W
- Area: 22.5 acres (9.1 ha)
- Built: 1922
- Architectural style: Bungalow/craftsman, Western Craftsman
- NRHP reference No.: 82004333
- Added to NRHP: September 29, 1982

The Brooks Lake Lodge, also known as the Brooks Lake Hotel and Diamond G Ranch, as well as the Two-Gwo-Tee Inn, is a recreational retreat in Fremont County, Wyoming near Dubois in the upper Wind River valley. The complex was built in 1922 to accommodate travelers coming to Yellowstone National Park on U.S. Route 287 from central Wyoming. The buildings are mainly of log construction with Craftsman style detailing.

== Description ==
The centerpiece of the complex is the lodge building. In plan the lodge is a Roman cross with a main section about 97 feet (30 m) by 34 feet (10 m) with crossing wings and an end extension. The lodge appears to have two stories but is in fact single story construction. The gabled roof is supported by log trusses. The main room in the lodge's interior is the dining room with a stone fireplace at one end, back-to-back with a similar fireplace facing into the lounge. Guest and utility rooms flank these spaces.

Other buildings on the site included guest cabins, a gas station, a barn, a stable and sheds. There were 15 guest cabins in 1922.

== History ==
The Brooks Lake Hotel was built in 1922 as part of a program to provide accommodations for tourists arriving via the Lander-Yellowstone Transportation Company and was operated by the Amoretti Hotel and Camp Company. Eugene Amoretti was a businessman in Lander who was alleged to be the first European born in South Pass City in 1871. The Brooks Lake hotel was one of two operated by Amoretti on the road to Yellowstone; the other was at Moran. The hotel was built quickly, started in April 1922 and completed by July 1. The hotel charged $6 per person daily or $35 weekly, and it flourished for a couple of years, but by 1926 it was bypassed by buses. That year it was reorganized by investor Jim Gratiot as the Diamond G Ranch, which offered a dude ranch experience. This strategy worked through the years following World War II, but business again declined in the 1950s. For a while the Morton Salt Company used it as an employee recreation facility.

The property has been redeveloped and operates as a luxury resort. It was listed on the National Register of Historic Places on September 29, 1982.

Early on July 28, 2019, a fire damaged the lodge. The lodge itself was saved, but the roof and dining area were damaged.
