= National Register of Historic Places listings in Lincoln County, Wyoming =

Location of Lincoln County in Wyoming

This is a list of the National Register of Historic Places listings in Lincoln County, Wyoming.

It is intended to be a complete list of the properties and districts on the National Register of Historic Places in Lincoln County, Wyoming, United States. The locations of National Register properties and districts for which the latitude and longitude coordinates are included below, may be seen in a map.

There are 13 properties and districts listed on the National Register in the county, one of which is a National Historic Landmark. Another property was previously listed on the National Register but has been removed.

This National Park Service list is complete through NPS recent listings posted September 26, 2025.

Contents: Counties in Wyoming
Albany - Big Horn - Campbell - Carbon - Converse - Crook - Fremont - Goshen - Hot Springs - Johnson - Laramie - Lincoln - Natrona - Niobrara - Park - Platte - Sheridan - Sublette - Sweetwater - Teton - Uinta - Washakie - Weston

== Current listings ==
	Name on the Register	Image	Date listed	Location	City or town	Description
1	Emigrant Springs		January 11, 1976 (#76001956)	18 miles (29 km) west of Fontenelle; 41°58′38″N 110°24′23″W	Kemmerer vicinity	Spring-watered hollow frequently used as a camping ground by pioneers on the Slate Creek Cutoff of the Emigrant Trail in Wyoming. Physical vestiges include wagon ruts and sandstone inscriptions.
2	Fossil Oregon Short Line Depot	Fossil Oregon Short Line Depot	December 11, 2013 (#13000919)	4408 U.S. Route 30; 41°49′00″N 110°43′35″W	Kemmerer vicinity	1882 train station (moved and enlarged in 1902) and an outbuilding—the centerpiece and some of the last standing remnants of the railroad town of Fossil, Wyoming.
3	Gateway	Gateway	August 24, 2020 (#100005447)	Address restricted	La Barge vicinity	Five petroglyph panels in a variety of styles at the summit of a steep ridge, including a battle scene and elk pierced with arrows, dating from the Archaic to the Protohistoric period.
4	Haddenham Cabin	Haddenham Cabin	December 23, 2003 (#03001339)	Fossil Butte National Monument; 41°49′52″N 110°44′07″W	Kemmerer vicinity	A-frame cabin used seasonally c. 1918–1968 by one of the leading fossil hunters quarrying the Green River Formation, representing a key period of advancements in paleontology and a distinctive local livelihood.
5	Johnston Scout Rocks		November 7, 1976 (#76001957)	Approximately one mile (1.6 km) south of Emigrant Springs; 41°57′55″N 110°24′37″W	Kemmerer vicinity	Rocks with inscriptions from travelers on the Slate Creek Cutoff of the Emigrant Trail in Wyoming, dated 1850–1888.
6	La Barge Bluffs Petroglyphs	La Barge Bluffs Petroglyphs	April 7, 2014 (#14000134)	Address restricted	La Barge vicinity	705-foot (215 m) span of elaborate petroglyph panels including detailed narrative scenes, dating from the late Prehistoric into the Historic period.
7	Lincoln County Courthouse	Lincoln County Courthouse	November 8, 1984 (#84000385)	925 Sage Ave. 41°47′33″N 110°32′25″W	Kemmerer	1925 courthouse noted for its unusually modest Neoclassical architecture and its association with the establishment of Lincoln County triggered by a burgeoning coal industry.
8	Names Hill	Names Hill	April 16, 1969 (#69000193)	U.S. Route 189; 42°10′35″N 110°11′15″W	La Barge vicinity	Limestone cliffs where mountain men (since at least 1822) and, later, pioneers on the Emigrant Trail in Wyoming carved their names. Now a state historic site.
9	J. C. Penney Historic District	J. C. Penney Historic District	June 2, 1978 (#78002830)	J.C. Penney Ave. and S. Main St. 41°47′40″N 110°32′13″W	Kemmerer	Small district representing the humble origins of J.C. Penney, the first national department store chain, including the original 1904 store, the contemporary flanking storefronts, and the J.C. Penney House.
10	J.C. Penney House	J.C. Penney House	June 18, 1976 (#76001958)	J.C. Penney Dr. 41°47′42″N 110°32′12″W	Kemmerer	House of James Cash Penney (1875–1971) from 1904 to 1909 as he launched what became the J.C. Penney retail chain. Also a contributing property to the J. C. Penney Historic District. Now a museum.
11	Rock Church	Rock Church	December 13, 1985 (#85003222)	2nd W. and 1st S. Sts. 42°47′30″N 111°00′06″W	Auburn	Locally unusual stone church built in 1889, reflecting its importance in a pioneer Latter-day Saints community. Also significant as a long-serving venue for a wide variety of social and cultural activities. Now a museum.
12	Salt River Hydroelectric Powerplant	Salt River Hydroelectric Powerplant	December 2, 1993 (#93000889)	County Road 104, 0.7 miles west of U.S. Route 89; 43°07′10″N 111°02′07″W	Etna vicinity	Hydroelectic power station with seven contributing properties, built in 1938 by the Rural Electrification Administration, profoundly affecting the development of the Star Valley. Extends into Bonneville County, Idaho.
13	US Post Office-Kemmerer Main	US Post Office-Kemmerer Main	May 19, 1987 (#87000786)	318 Sapphire St. 41°47′39″N 110°32′21″W	Kemmerer	1936 post office and federal office building, noted for its local prominence, unusually ornate Neoclassical architecture for the period, and exemplification of federal assistance to small communities during the Great Depression.

== Former listings ==
	Name on the Register	Image	Date listed	Date removed	Location	City or town	Description
1	Kemmerer Hotel		December 2, 1985 (#85003064)	December 11, 2013	Pine and Sapphire; 41°47′39″N 110°32′18″W	Kemmerer	Demolished in June 2004

== See also ==
- List of National Historic Landmarks in Wyoming
- National Register of Historic Places listings in Wyoming
