= Pacific Creek =

Pacific Creek may refer to:

- Pacific Creek (Teton County, Wyoming)
- Pacific Creek (Sweetwater County, Wyoming)
- Pacific Creek (British Columbia)
