= South Pass (Wyoming) =

Route across Continental Divide in Wyoming, United States

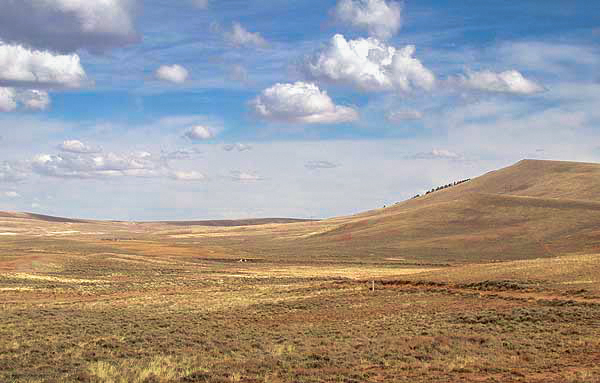
- Historic South Pass, seen from the east looking westward towards Pacific Springs
- Interactive map of South Pass
- Elevation: 7,412 ft (2,259 m)
- Traversed by: Oregon Trail, California Trail, and Mormon Trail, Wyoming Highway 28

Third Approach
- Location: Fremont County, Wyoming; United States
- Range: Wind River Range and Antelope Hills (Radium Springs, Wyoming)
- Coordinates: 42.3303°N 108.9738°W
- Topo map: USGS Pacific Springs
- South Pass
- U.S. National Register of Historic Places
- U.S. National Historic Landmark
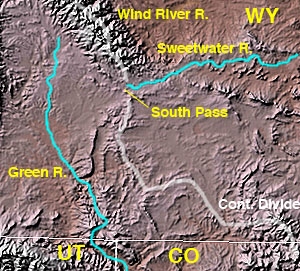
- Map of southwestern Wyoming showing location of South Pass at the headwaters of the Sweetwater River

- Location within Wyoming Location within the United States
- Nearest city: South Pass City, Wyoming
- NRHP reference No.: 66000754

Significant dates
- Added to NRHP: October 15, 1966
- Designated NHL: January 20, 1961

South Pass (elevation 7,412 ft (2,259 m) and 7,550 ft (2,300 m)) is a route across the Continental Divide, in the Rocky Mountains in southwestern Wyoming. It lies in a broad high region, 35 miles (56 km) wide, between the nearly 14,000 ft (4,300 m) Wind River Range to the north and the over 8,500 ft (2,600 m) Oregon Buttes and arid, saline near-impassable Great Divide Basin to the south. The Pass lies in southwestern Fremont County, approximately 35 miles (56 km) SSW of Lander.

Though it approaches a mile and a half high, South Pass is the lowest point on the Continental Divide between the Central and Southern Rocky Mountains. The passes furnish a natural crossing point of the Rockies. The historic pass became the route for emigrants on the Oregon, California, and Mormon trails to the West during the 19th century. It was designated as a U.S. National Historic Landmark on January 20, 1961.

== History ==
Though well known to Native Americans, South Pass was first traversed in 1812 by American explorers who were seeking a safer way to return from the West Coast than they had taken to it. As a natural crossing point of the Rockies its pioneering was a significant achievement in the westward expansion of the United States. Because the Lewis and Clark Expedition of 1803–1806 was searching for a water route across the Continental Divide it did not learn of South Pass from local peoples. Instead, the expedition followed a northerly route up the Missouri River, crossing the Rockies over difficult passes in the Bitterroot Range between present-day Montana and Idaho.

The first recorded crossing was made on October 22, 1812 by Robert Stuart, and six companions from the Pacific Fur Company of John Jacob Astor. They were trying to avoid Crow warriors farther north, on their return to St. Louis, Missouri from Astoria, Oregon. A Shoshone had told Stuart of "...a shorter trace to the South than that by which Mr. Hunt had traversed the R. Mountains..." In 1856 Ramsay Crooks, one of the party, wrote a letter describing their journey:

In 1811, the overland party of Mr. Astor's expedition, under the command of Mr. Wilson P. Hunt, of Trenton, New Jersey, although numbering sixty well armed men, found the Indians so very troublesome in the country of the Yellowstone River, that the party of seven persons who left Astoria toward the end of June, 1812, considering it dangerous to pass again by the route of 1811, turned toward the southeast as soon as they had crossed the main chain of the Rocky Mountains, and, after several days' journey, came through the celebrated 'South Pass' in the month of November, 1812.

Pursuing from thence an easterly course, they fell upon the River Platte of the Missouri, where they passed the winter and reached St. Louis in April, 1813.

The seven persons forming the party were Robert McClelland of Hagerstown, who, with the celebrated Captain Wells, was captain of spies under General Wayne in his famous Indian campaign, Joseph Miller of Baltimore, for several years an officer of the U.S. Army, Robert Stuart, a citizen of Detroit, Benjamin Jones, of Missouri, who acted as huntsman of the party, Francois LeClaire, a halfbreed, and André Valée, a Canadian voyageur, and Ramsay Crooks, who is the only survivor of this small band of adventurers.

— Letter of Ramsay Crooks to the Detroit Free Press, June 28, 1856

Stuart's "Travel Memorandum" was left with President James Madison, but the War of 1812 preempted western exploration. A translation of his journal was published in an 1821 French journal, but South Pass would have to be rediscovered by later explorers from information provided by Crow Indians.

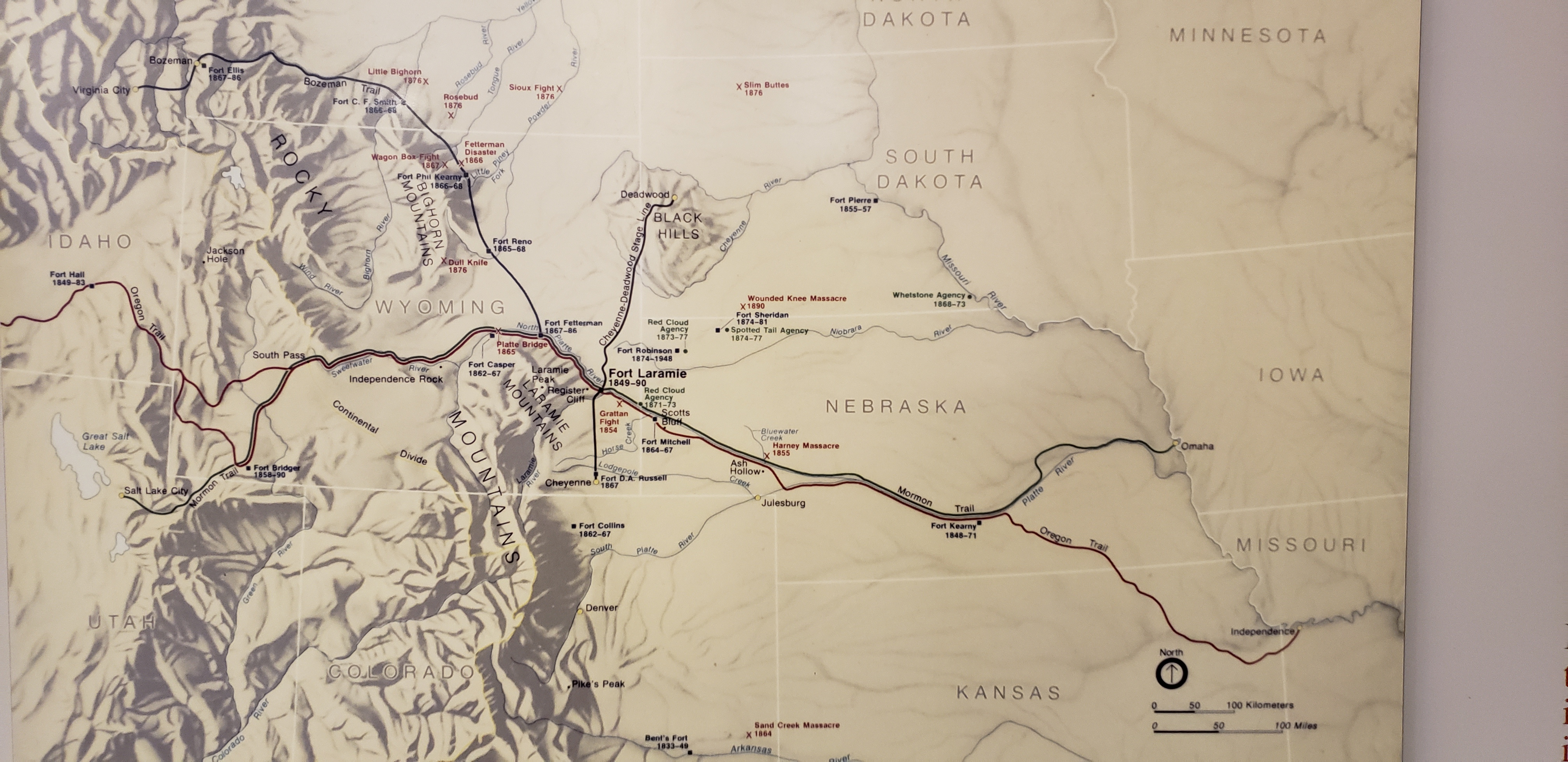
Location of South Pass along the Oregon Trail

In 1823 William Henry Ashley's Rocky Mountain Fur Company led to the rediscovery of the pass. Jedediah Smith's party, part of Ashley's Hundred, made the first crossing traveling east to west in Feb. 1824. Ashley subsequently established the first Rocky Mountain Rendezvous in 1825. Ashley sold out to Smith, William Sublette, and David Jackson in 1826, becoming their supplier.

In 1832 Captain Benjamin Bonneville, aided by Michel Cerre and Joseph R. Walker, blazed a wagon road across the pass. Their caravan of 20 wagons, in place of the usual pack-train, supplied the fur trappers from Fort Bonneville, which they established near the Green River.

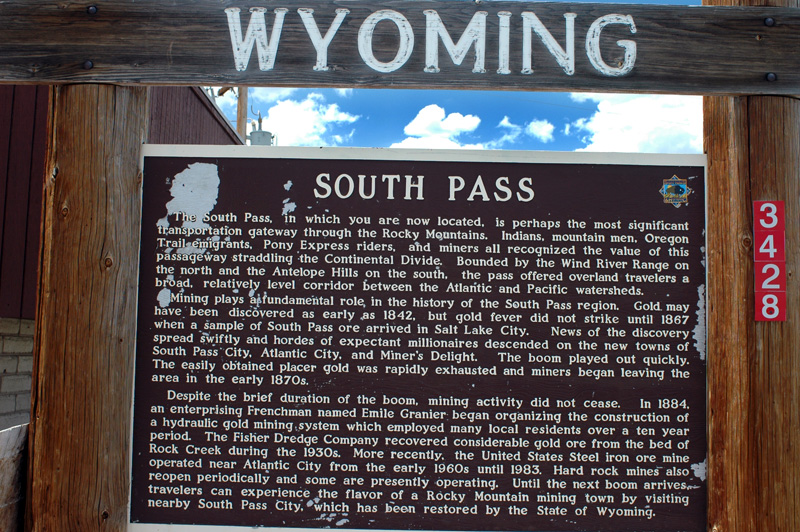
South Pass marker

In 1834, Nathaniel Jarvis Wyeth led the first Methodist missionaries Jason Lee, Daniel Lee, and Cyrus Shepard across the pass. They were accompanied by the naturalist John Kirk Townsend, who documented this first use of the Oregon-California Trail, avoiding the Lander Cutoff used by the fur traders. Wyeth then established Fort Hall on the Snake River and the Lees settled the Willamette Valley. Robert "Doc" Newell's first child was born at South Pass in June 1835. Also in 1835, Thomas Fitzpatrick led Protestant missionaries Samuel Parker and Dr. Marcus Whitman across the pass. In 1836, Fitzpatrick guided the "First White Women to Cross This Pass", Narcissa Whitman and Eliza Hart Spalding, along with and their husbands, plus Miles Goodyear and William Gray. By 1838, four additional American missionary women had crossed the pass, Myra Fairbanks Eells, Mary Richardson Walker, Mary Augusta Dix Gray and Sarah Gilbert White Smith.

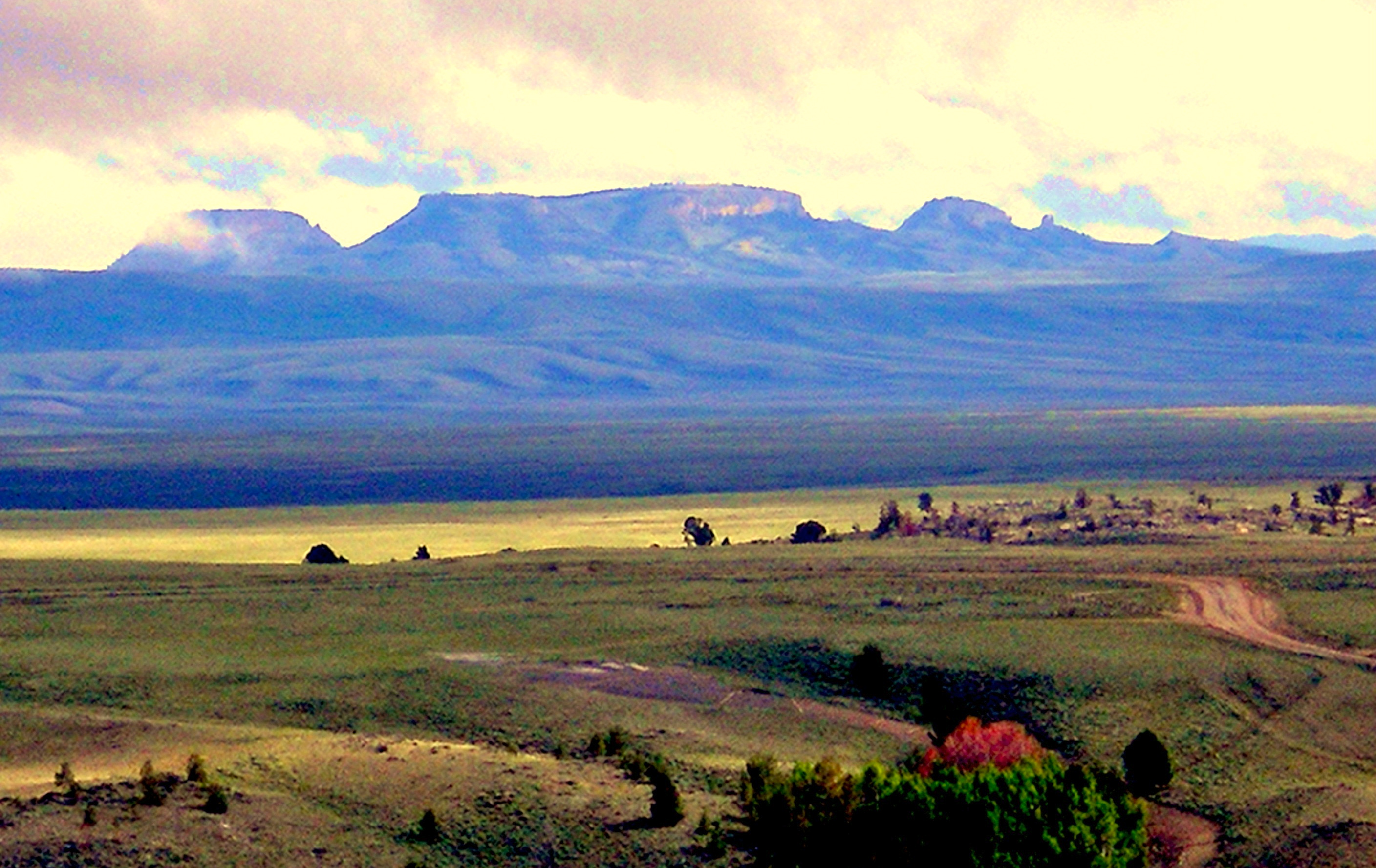
Oregon Buttes - a wilderness study area on the Oregon Trail near South Pass City

The first family of emigrants, the Walkers, crossed the pass in 1840 with the intention of settling in Oregon. Joel Pickens Walker, and his wife Mary Young Walker, made the journey with their four children. In 1841, Fitzpatrick led the Bartleson-Bidwell Party across the pass, the first wagon train.

In 1842, John C. Fremont led a United States Army Corps of Topographical Engineers expedition to survey South Pass. Reaching the pass on 8 Aug. 1842, Fremont wrote, "The ascent had been so gradual, that, with all the intimate knowledge possessed by Carson, who had made the country his home for seventeen years, we were obliged to watch very closely to find the place at which we had reached the culminating point." In his 1843 expedition, Fremont was able to determine the elevation of the pass at 7,490 feet above sea level. He wrote, "...it may be assumed to be about half-way between the Mississippi and the Pacific ocean, on the common traveling route...the emigrant road to Oregon."

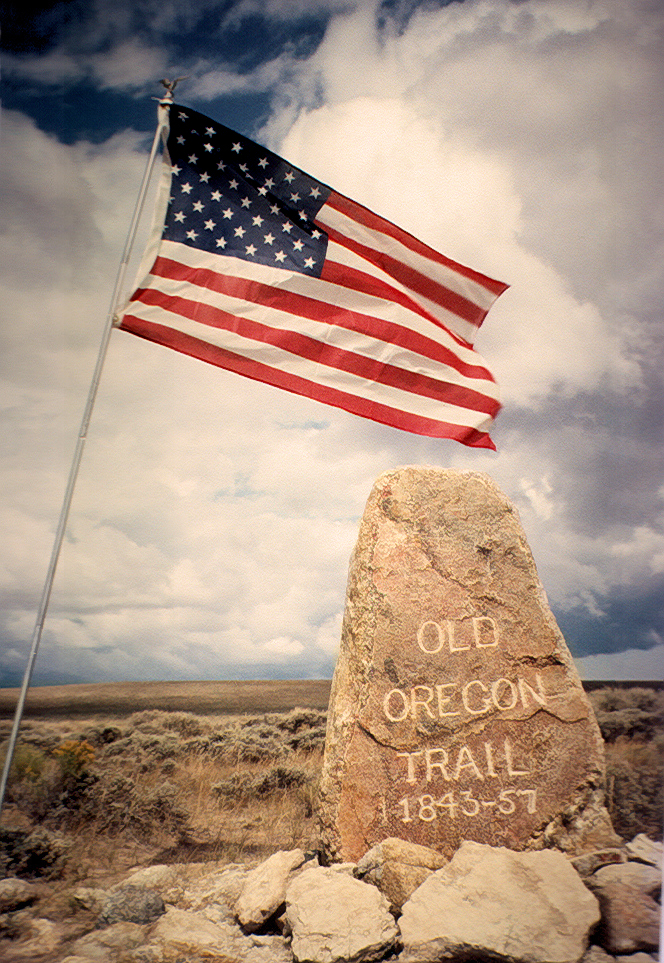
Ezra Meeker erected this boulder near Pacific Springs in 1906 to mark the trail.

Stephen W. Kearny led the first military expedition to South Pass in 1845. By 1848, 18,487 Americans had crossed the pass, and over 300,000 by 1860.

Gold had been discovered in the gulches near the pass as early as 1842. However, it was not until 1867, when an ore sample was transported to Salt Lake City, that an influx of miners descended into the region. The gold rush led to the establishment of booming mining communities, such as South Pass City and Atlantic City. The placer gold in the streams was exhausted quickly, however, and by 1870 the miners began leaving the region. In 1884, Emile Granier, a French mining engineer, established a hydraulic mining operation that allowed gold mining to continue. Gold mining was revived in nearby Rock Creek in the 1930s. Additionally, from 1962 through 1983, a U.S. Steel iron ore mine operated in Atlantic City, and the company's Atlantic City Mine Railroad crossed South Pass.

After passage of the Pacific Telegraph Act of 1860, South Pass Station was established in 1861, at Last Crossing on the Sweetwater River. South Pass was designated a National Historic Landmark in 1961.

Wyoming Highway 28 traverses the modern pass, roughly following the route of the Oregon Trail. Wagon ruts are still clearly visible at numerous sites within a few miles of the highway.

== Topography ==
The pass is a broad open saddle with prairie and sagebrush, allowing a broad and nearly level route between the Atlantic and Pacific watersheds. The Sweetwater River flows past the east side of the pass, and Pacific Creek rises on the west side. Historic South Pass is the lower of the two passes (elevation 7,412 feet (2,259 m)), and was the easy crossing point used by emigrants. Wyoming Highway 28 crosses the Continental Divide 2.5 miles (4.0 km) to the northwest at elevation 7,550 feet (2,300 m), and its crossing is also named South Pass. The Lander Cutoff Route crosses the Continental Divide at the far northwest end of the broad South Pass region, about 25 miles (40 km) to the northwest of the South Passes, at an elevation of 8,030 feet (2,450 m).

== See also ==
- Great Migration of 1843
- Mormon Emigration
- Overland Trail
- Continental Divide of the Americas
- List of passes of the Rocky Mountains
- South Pass City, Wyoming
- South Pass greenstone belt
