= South Pass City, Wyoming =

Unincorporated community in the U.S. state of Wyoming

- South Pass City
- U.S. National Register of Historic Places
- U.S. Historic district
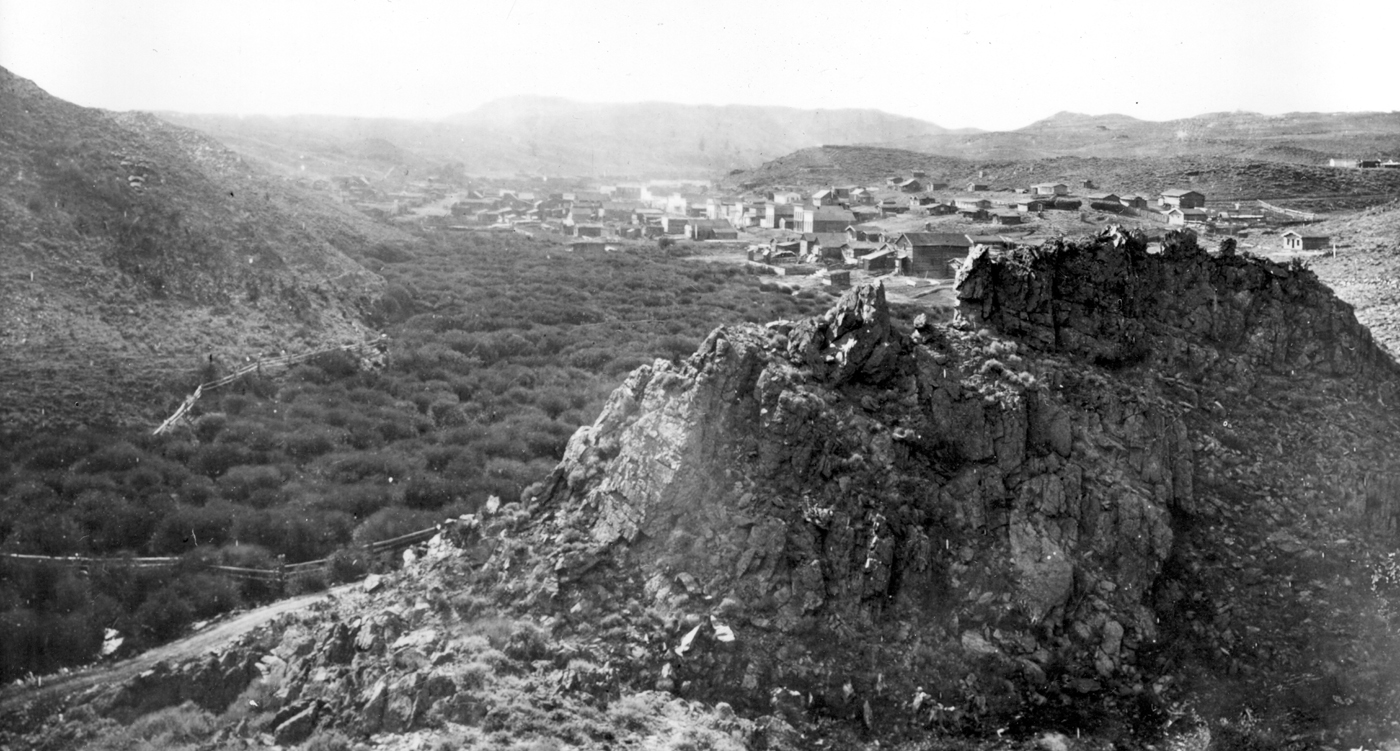
- South Pass City in 1870, three years after gold was discovered

- Location within Wyoming Location within the United States
- Location: South Pass Rd., South Pass City, Fremont County, Wyoming
- Coordinates: 42°28′06″N 108°47′59″W
- Built: 1867
- NRHP reference No.: 70000670
- Added to NRHP: February 26, 1970

South Pass City is an unincorporated community in Fremont County, Wyoming, United States. It is located 2 miles (3 km) south of the intersection of Wyoming Highways 28 and 131. A former mining town near the Oregon Trail, it became a ghost town after later gold mines were closed. The entire community is listed on the National Register of Historic Places. The closest inhabited settlement is Atlantic City.

== History ==
South Pass City developed rapidly as a stage and telegraph station on the Oregon Trail during the 1850s. The site of the first settlement in the area was about 9 miles (14 km) south of present-day South Pass City, at what is today known as Burnt Ranch. Burnt Ranch was located where the Emigrant Trails crossed the Sweetwater River for the last time and ascended toward South Pass.

In August 1861, 25-year-old Samuel Clemens (later Mark Twain) passed through South Pass City via stagecoach with his brother Orion, who was the newly appointed Secretary of the Nevada Territory. Twain later wrote about the experience in Roughing It, first published in 1872: "... we hove in sight of South Pass City. The hotelkeeper, the postmaster, the blacksmith, the mayor, the constable, the city marshal and the principal citizen and property holder, all came out and greeted us cheerily, and we gave him good day. He gave us a little Indian news, and a little Rocky Mountain news, and we gave him some Plains information in return. He then retired to his lonely grandeur and we climbed on up among the bristling peaks and the ragged clouds. South Pass City consisted of four log cabins, one of which was unfinished, and the gentleman with all those offices and titles was the chiefest of the ten citizens of the place. Think of hotelkeeper, postmaster, blacksmith, mayor, constable, city marshal and principal citizen all condensed into one person and crammed into one skin. [Fellow passenger] Bemis said he was 'a perfect Allen's revolver of dignities.' [The Allen was a small revolver notorious for sometimes firing all six chambers at once, according to Mark Twain.] And he said that if he were to die as postmaster, or as blacksmith, or as postmaster and blacksmith both, the people might stand it; but if he were to die all over, it would be a frightful loss to the community."

In 1867, gold was discovered in the vicinity, and a year later prospecting began on what would become the Carissa mine. Prospectors and adventurers quickly arrived and founded South Pass City. Within a year, the community's population had swelled to about 2,000. William H. Bright, a saloon owner who was elected to the Wyoming Territorial Legislature and served as President of the Territorial Council, introduced a women's suffrage bill, which passed. When the Women's Suffrage Act was signed into law by Territorial Governor John Allen Campbell on December 10, 1869, Wyoming became the first jurisdiction in the United States to grant women the right to vote, a right which was not granted women nationally until 1920.

Esther Hobart Morris became the first female justice of the peace in the United States in 1870. She began her tenure as justice in South Pass City on February 14, 1870, serving a term of nearly 9 months. The Sweetwater County Board of County Commissioners appointed Morris as justice of the peace after the previous justice, R. S. Barr, resigned in protest of Wyoming Territory's passage of the women's suffrage amendment in December 1869.

Within a decade, the city's population shrank dramatically, as the large gold deposits that had been hoped for failed to materialize. By the mid-1870s, South Pass City's population was reduced to about 100 people but apparently grew to 180 by 1901. Over the next century the population of South Pass City declined even further. Many of the city's homes, mercantile stores, hotels and saloons fell into disrepair. A few businesses continued to operate in South Pass City, with the last of the pioneer families finally moving out in 1949.

== South Pass City State Historic Site ==
By the end of the 20th century, steps were being taken to renew the community, and to develop it as an historic site for destination tourism. The community in the early 21st century consists of two areas: South Pass City, in which a handful of residents live, and South Pass City State Historic Site, which preserves more than 30 historic structures dating from the city's heyday in the 1860s and 1870s. In 1970, the community was added to the National Register of Historic Places. The town has been extensively documented by the Historic American Buildings Survey (HABS) in drawings and in photographs by HABS photographer Jack Boucher.

In 2003, the Wyoming State Legislature purchased the Carissa Mine and added the property to the South Pass City State Historic Site. The Carissa Mine was the main economic engine for South Pass City for many years. Wyoming State Parks partnered with the Abandoned Mine Lands division of the Department of Environmental Quality to remediate mine hazards and stabilize buildings. Additional support from the Wyoming State Legislature and organizations like the Friends of South Pass City have raised funds for restoration and exhibition of the mine. Today the mine buildings can be toured with demonstrations of historic mining and milling equipment.

== Highways ==
The road leading west from South Pass City intersects with WYO 28 two miles (3 km) west of town; Wyoming 28 intersects with US 287 35 miles (56 km) north of that intersection.

== Climate ==
Climate data for South Pass City, Wyoming, 1991–2020 normals, 1900–2020 extremes: 7840ft (2390m)
Month	Jan	Feb	Mar	Apr	May	Jun	Jul	Aug	Sep	Oct	Nov	Dec	Year
Record high °F (°C)	60 (16)	53 (12)	68 (20)	75 (24)	83 (28)	93 (34)	98 (37)	102 (39)	87 (31)	80 (27)	65 (18)	62 (17)	102 (39)
Mean maximum °F (°C)	42.8 (6.0)	41.7 (5.4)	52.1 (11.2)	63.5 (17.5)	73.5 (23.1)	80.8 (27.1)	85.9 (29.9)	84.2 (29.0)	78.9 (26.1)	69.3 (20.7)	51.6 (10.9)	42.4 (5.8)	80.4 (26.9)
Mean daily maximum °F (°C)	28.0 (−2.2)	29.2 (−1.6)	38.3 (3.5)	47.4 (8.6)	58.5 (14.7)	69.7 (20.9)	77.6 (25.3)	76.6 (24.8)	67.2 (19.6)	52.7 (11.5)	37.2 (2.9)	27.7 (−2.4)	50.8 (10.5)
Daily mean °F (°C)	15.2 (−9.3)	16.7 (−8.5)	25.3 (−3.7)	33.4 (0.8)	43.3 (6.3)	52.2 (11.2)	59.2 (15.1)	57.5 (14.2)	49.1 (9.5)	37.6 (3.1)	24.4 (−4.2)	15.4 (−9.2)	35.8 (2.1)
Mean daily minimum °F (°C)	2.4 (−16.4)	4.1 (−15.5)	12.3 (−10.9)	19.3 (−7.1)	28.0 (−2.2)	34.7 (1.5)	40.8 (4.9)	38.4 (3.6)	31.0 (−0.6)	22.6 (−5.2)	11.7 (−11.3)	3.0 (−16.1)	20.7 (−6.3)
Mean minimum °F (°C)	−18.8 (−28.2)	−20.7 (−29.3)	−9.5 (−23.1)	5.4 (−14.8)	15.1 (−9.4)	24.4 (−4.2)	31.3 (−0.4)	28.8 (−1.8)	19.6 (−6.9)	4.3 (−15.4)	−12.9 (−24.9)	−19.4 (−28.6)	−22.0 (−30.0)
Record low °F (°C)	−45 (−43)	−40 (−40)	−33 (−36)	−22 (−30)	0 (−18)	6 (−14)	18 (−8)	9 (−13)	−5 (−21)	−26 (−32)	−30 (−34)	−46 (−43)	−46 (−43)
Average precipitation inches (mm)	0.92 (23)	0.62 (16)	0.74 (19)	1.34 (34)	1.92 (49)	1.33 (34)	0.86 (22)	0.95 (24)	1.13 (29)	0.98 (25)	0.96 (24)	0.89 (23)	12.64 (322)
Average snowfall inches (cm)	19.5 (50)	19.0 (48)	15.9 (40)	19.3 (49)	9.6 (24)	0.7 (1.8)	0.0 (0.0)	0.0 (0.0)	3.5 (8.9)	12.1 (31)	15.0 (38)	21.5 (55)	136.1 (345.7)
Source 1: NOAA (1981-2010 precipitation)
Source 2: XMACIS2 (1991-2003 snowfall, records & monthly max/mins)

== Popular culture ==
In The Outlaw Trail: A Journey Through Time, Robert Redford devoted a chapter to South Pass City.

== Gallery ==
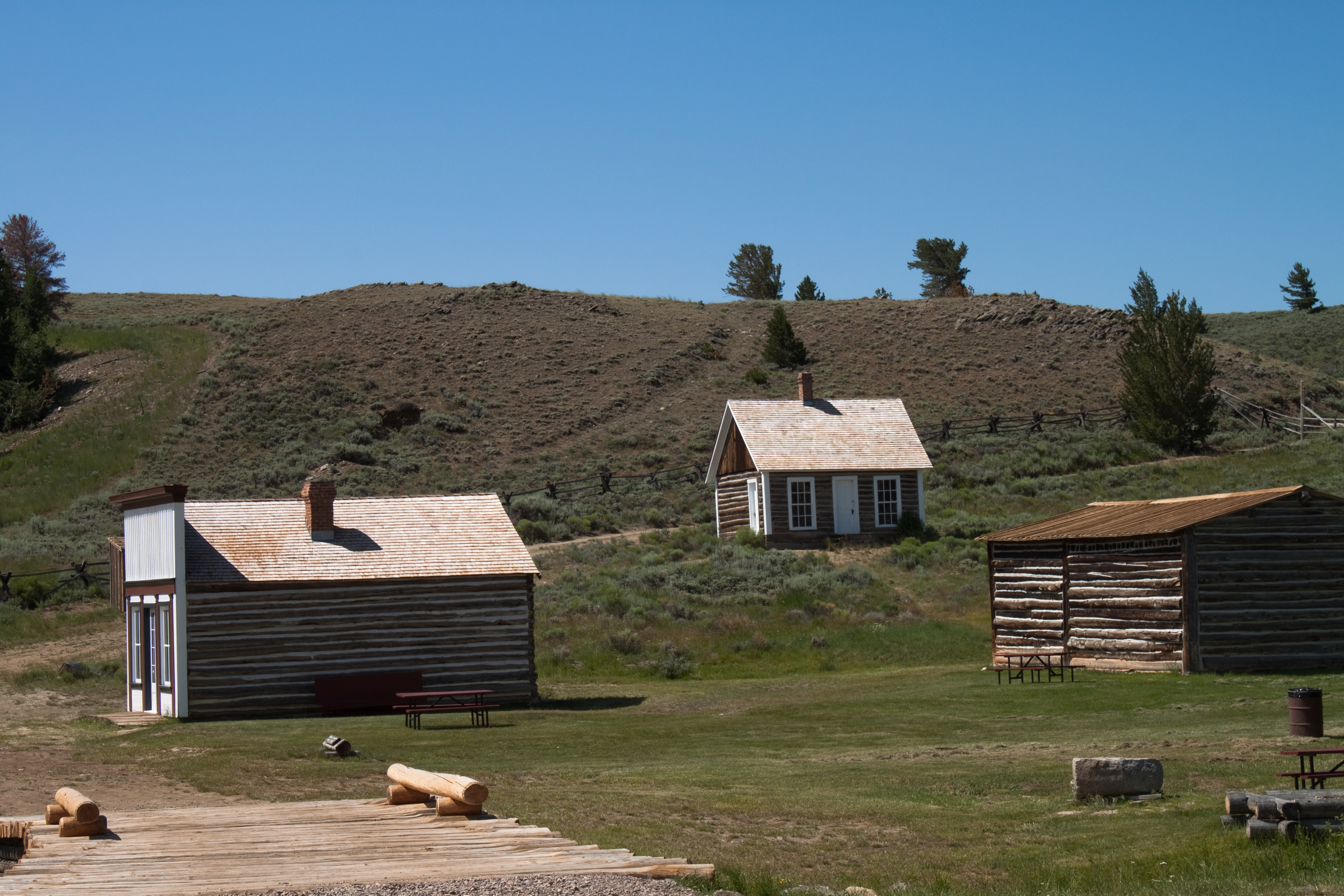

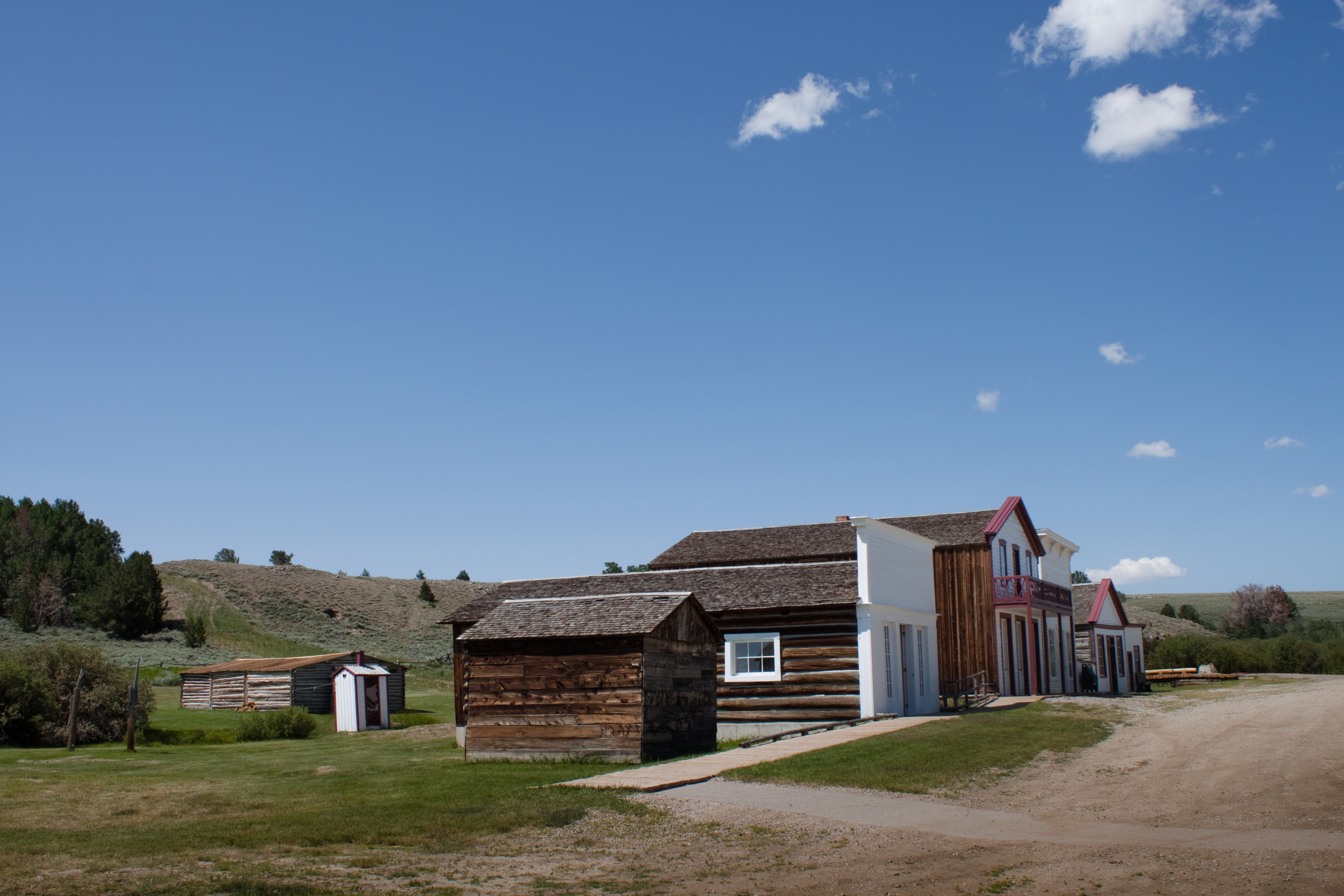

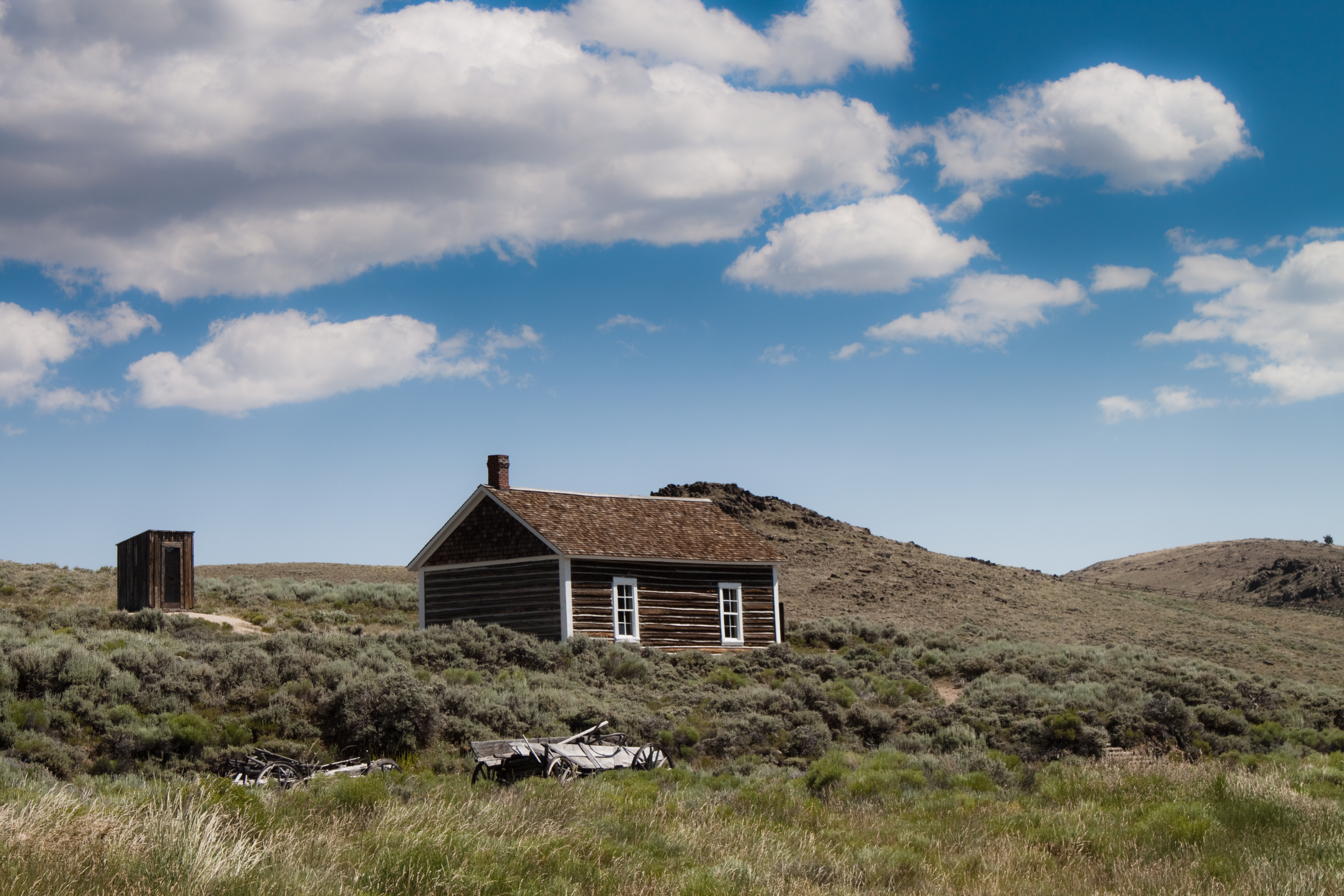

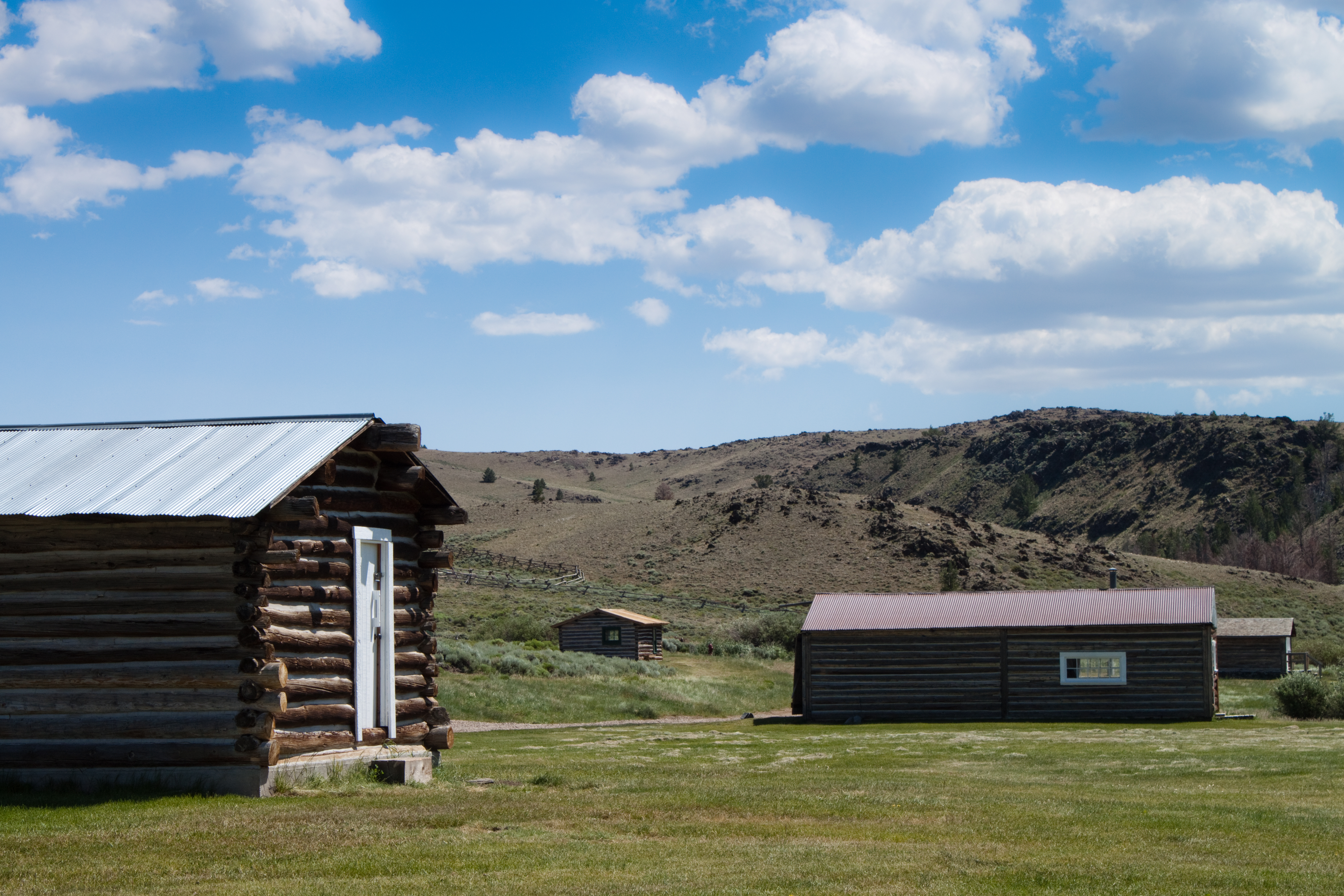

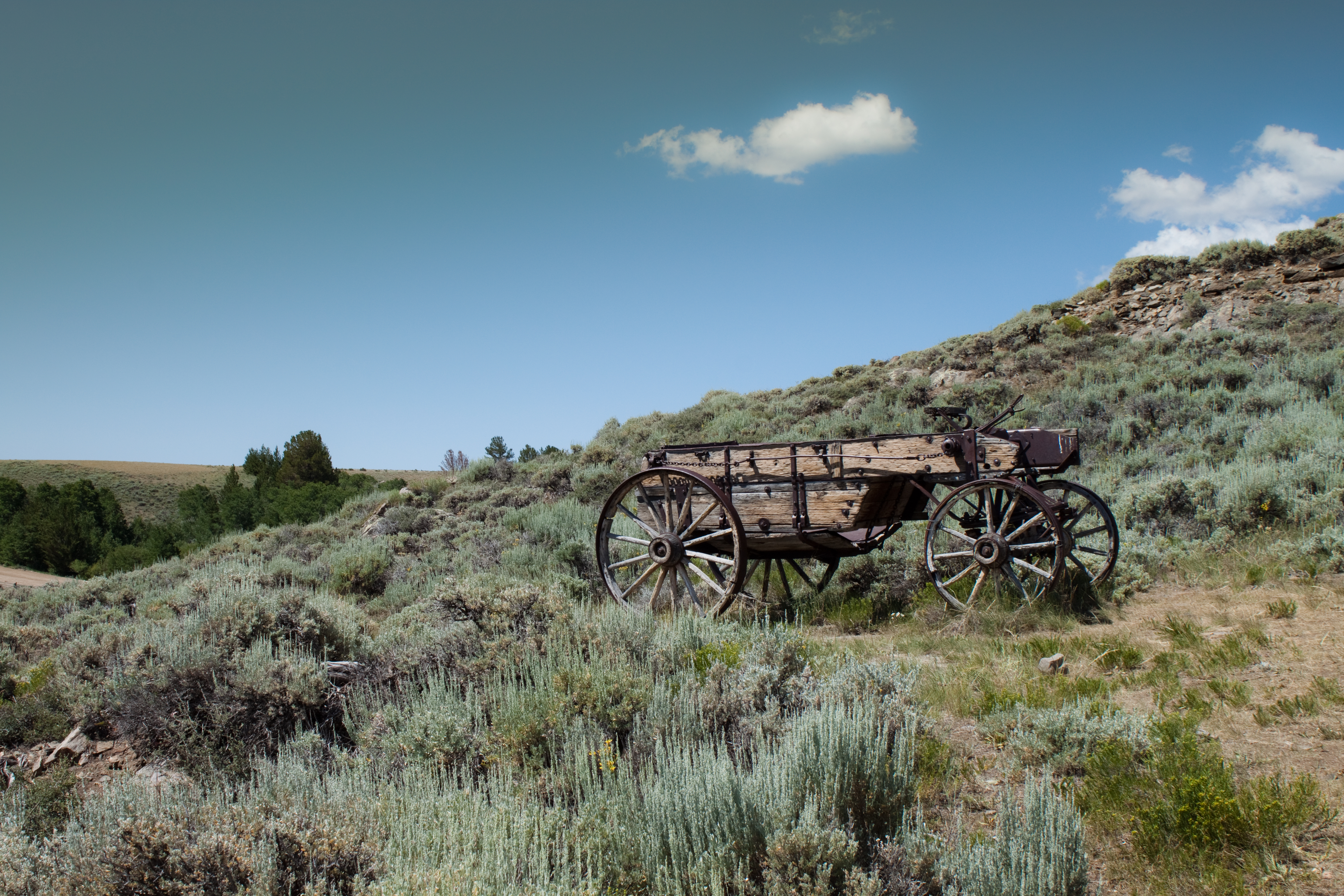

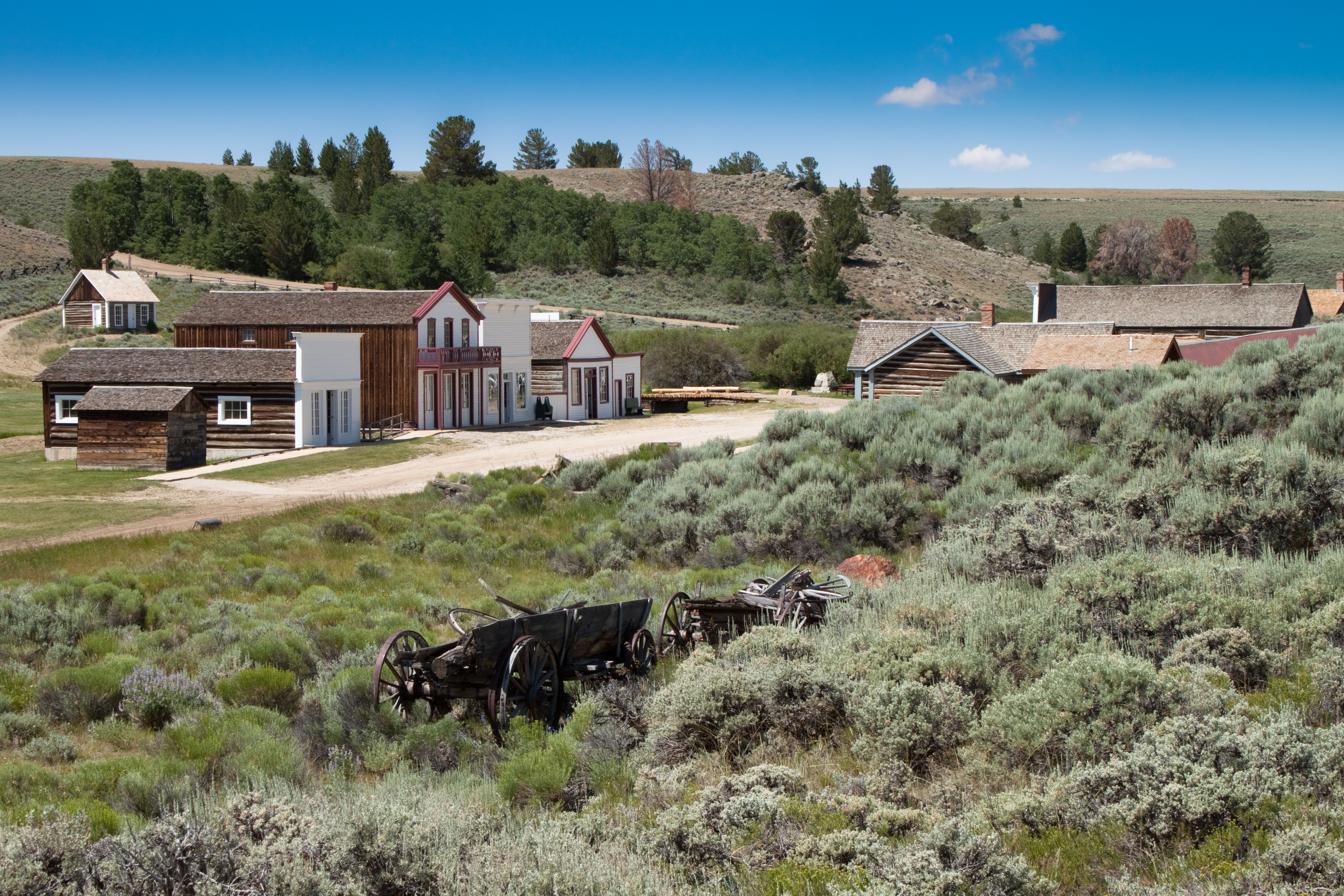

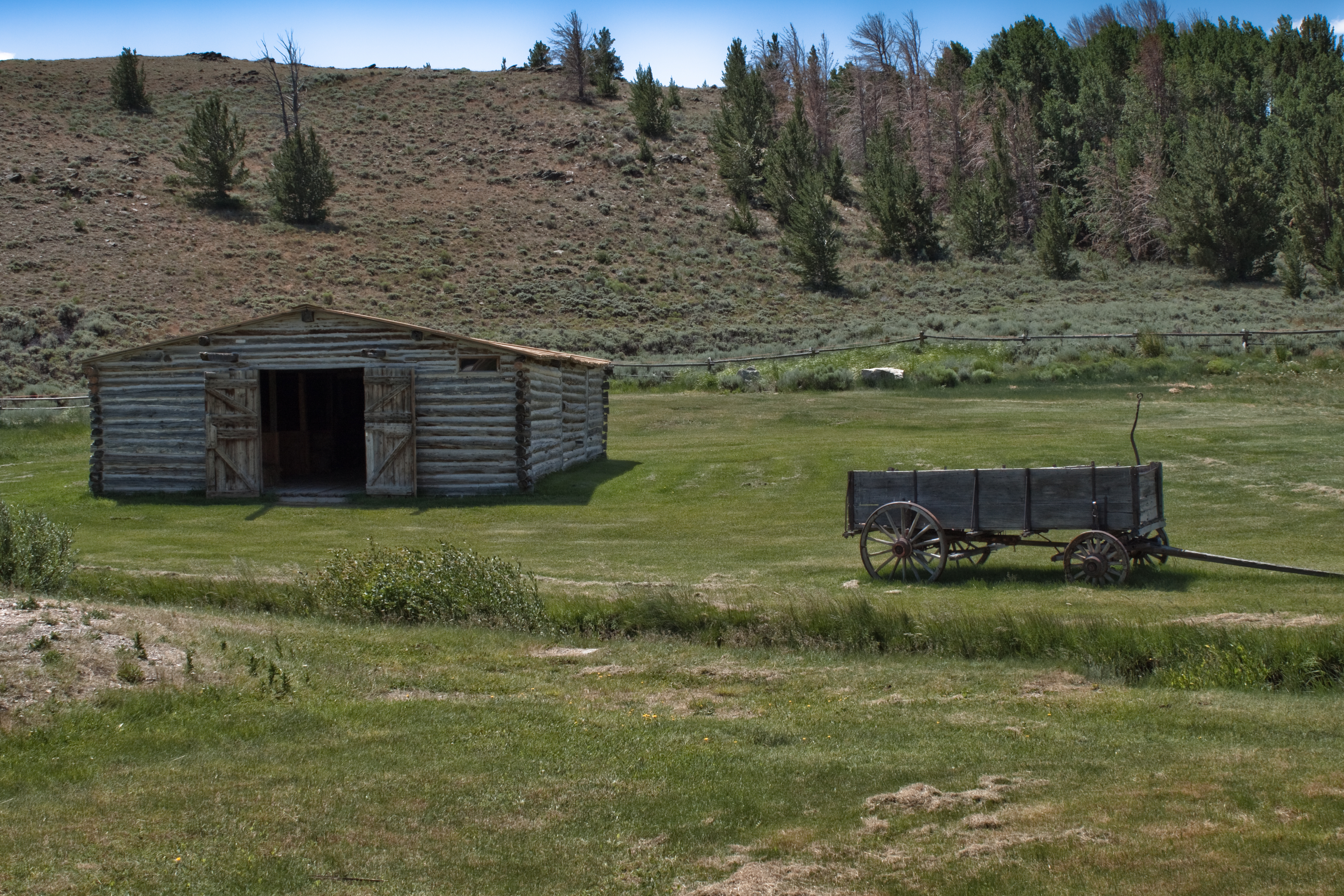

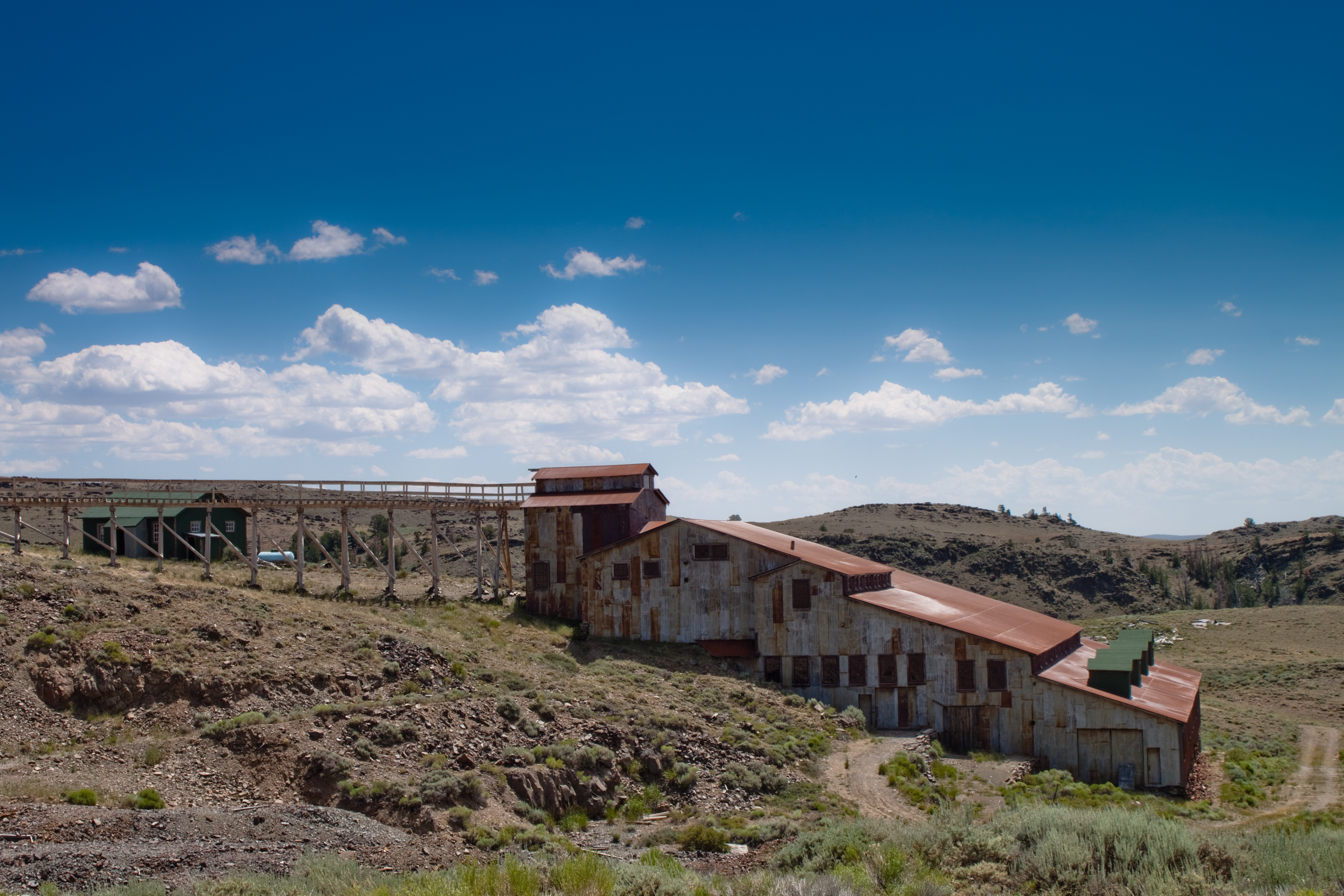

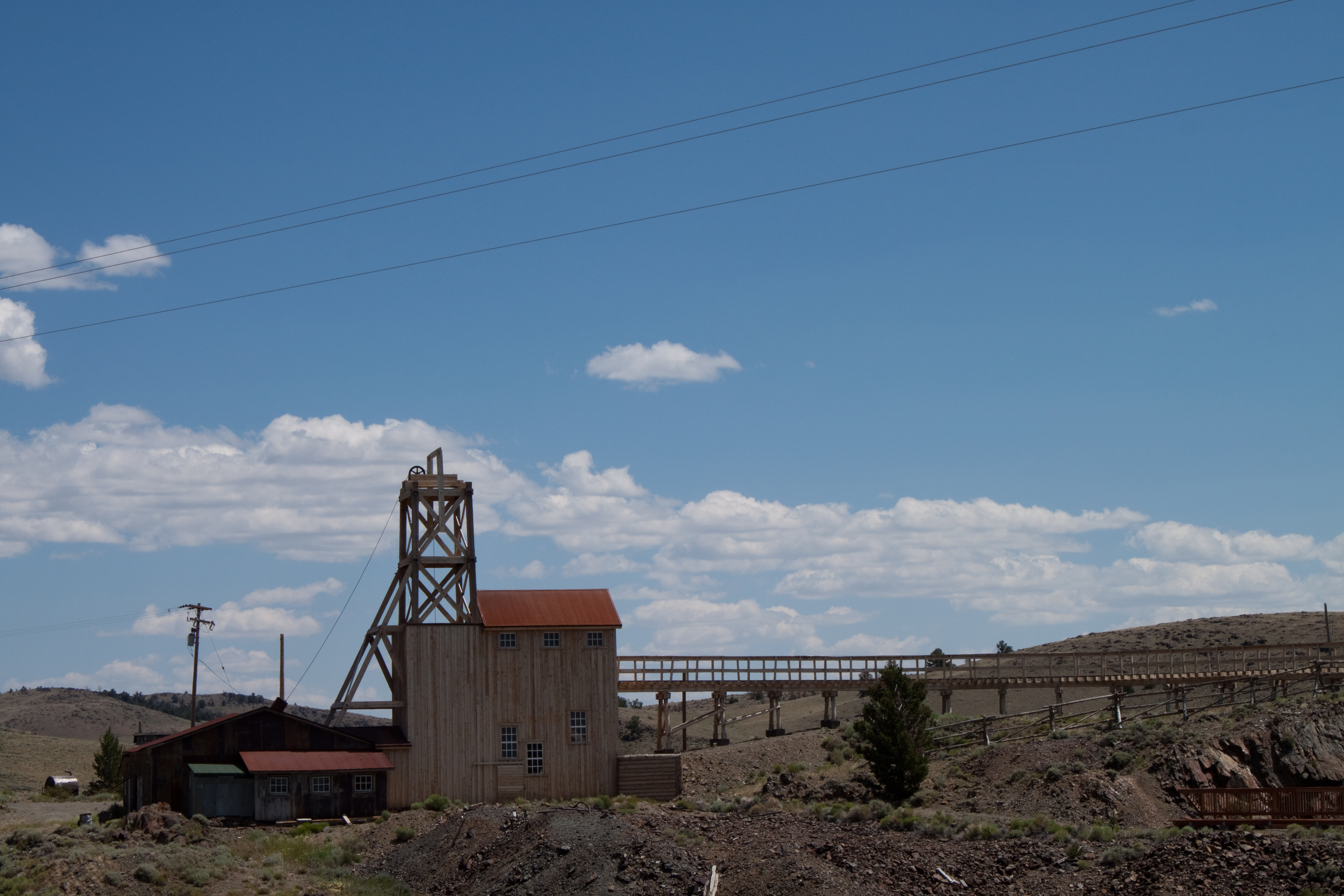
