= Burnt Ranch Historical Monument =

Coordinates: 42°22′37.18″N 108°42′58.89″W

Burnt Ranch is a historical monument near (and original site of) South Pass City, Wyoming.
