= Oregon Buttes =

Buttes in Wyoming, United States

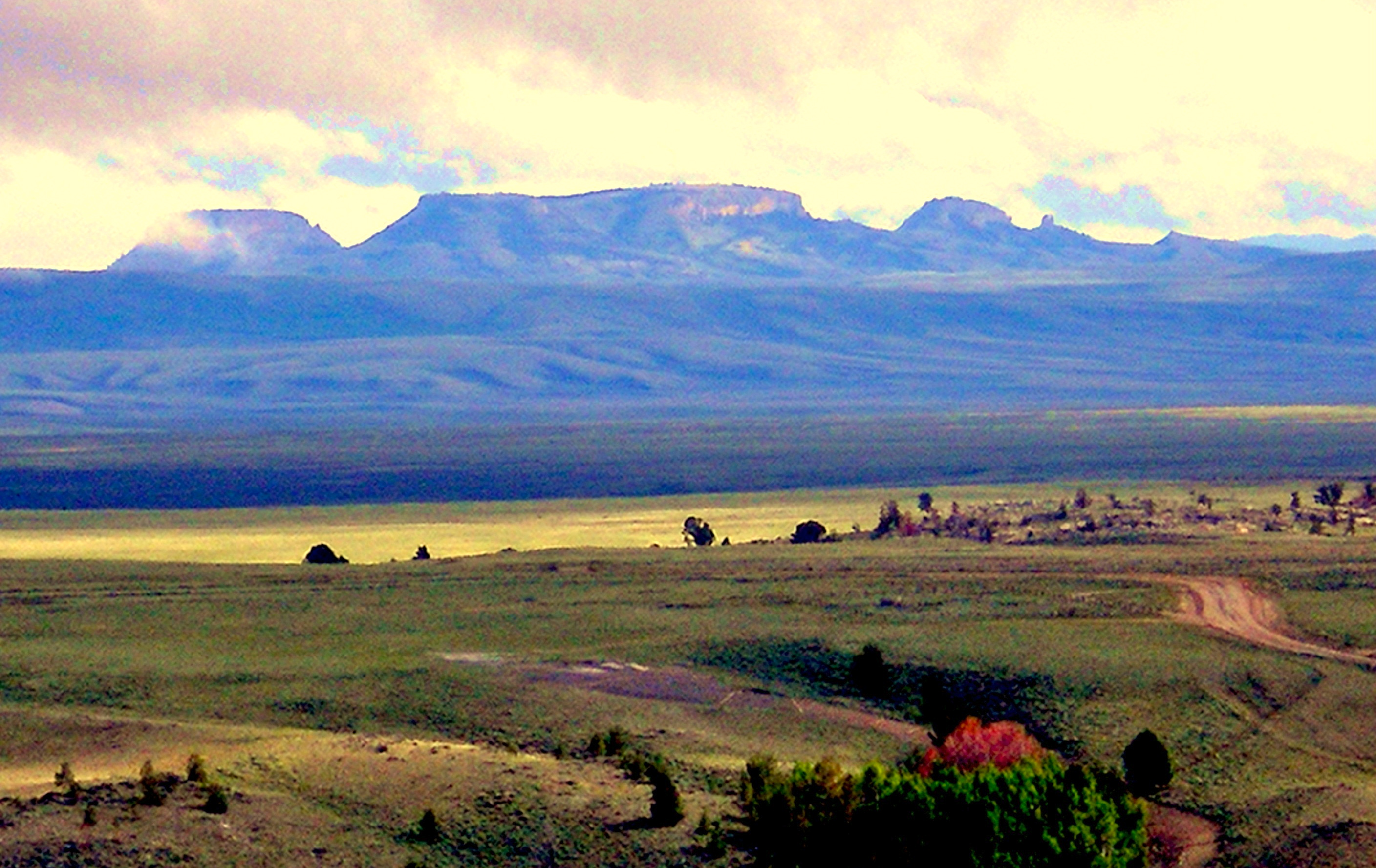
- Oregon Buttes

Highest point
- Peak: North Butte
- Elevation: 8,562 ft (2,610 m) Oregon Buttes

Geography
- Location: Sweetwater County
- Country: United States
- State: Wyoming
- Range coordinates: 42°15′36″N 108°50′55″W

The Oregon Buttes are three distinctive buttes on the northern end of the Red Desert in the state of Wyoming.

Lying to the south of South Pass along the Continental Divide, they reach a height of 8,562 ft (2,610 m) and rise some 1,500 feet (460 m) above the nearby Oregon Trail.

Pioneers used descriptive names for them, such as "Table Rocks." Even in the 2020s they remain in a remote area and can be difficult to reach. From the top one can see the Wind River Range to the north, and the Uinta Mountains to the southwest.

Petrified wood is found in the area, but it is closed for hunting of minerals, such as gold panning.

Near 12 miles (19 km) southwest of the buttes stands the Tri-Territory site where the Oregon Territory, First Mexican Empire, and the Louisiana Purchase met at a single point.

== Relationship to the Oregon Trail ==
Located just south of South Pass along the Continental Divide over the Rocky Mountains, the Oregon Buttes signified to pioneers on the Oregon Trail the entrance to the Oregon Territory.

In recognition of what they represented, and portended, Theodore Talbot wrote in 1843, "Today we set foot in the Oregon Territory, the land of promise. As of yet it only promises an increased supply of sage and sand."

In general, travelers on the Oregon Trail considered the Oregon Buttes variously as marking the trail's halfway point, entering the Pacific Watershed, or, since borders remained unresolved, "Oregon" itself.

== Geography ==
The Continental Divide of the Americas splits at South Pass, with the Wind River Range to the north and the Oregon Buttes to the south; the Great Divide Basin lies to the Buttes' southeast.

== Ecology ==
The Oregon Buttes feature many types of vegetation, including thick stands of aspen, groves of limber pine, and meadows. The area is prime raptor habitat.

== Geology ==
The buttes consist of soil layers and rocks from the Wasatch Formation (from lower to middle Eocene). This unit consists of variegated red, purple, and green mudstones and sandstones deposited by ancient river systems. This is followed by the Laney Member of the Green River Formation (middle Eocene). These are the remnants of Lake Gosiute, a massive prehistoric lake that once covered the Red Desert. Finally, the Bridger Formation (middle Eocene), which is famous for its mammalian fossils, similar to Fossil Butte near Kemmerer. The summits are capped by the Arikaree Formation (lower Miocene), which includes tuffaceous sandstones and conglomerates that have protected the softer underlying layers from erosion. The Bridger and Green River formations have yielded primitive mammals, including early primates and rhinoceros-like herbivores. Specifically, fossils of the genus Lambdotherium have been documented in the area.

== See also ==
- Boars Tusk
- Crowheart Butte
