= Emigrant Trail in Wyoming =

19th century pioneer route in western United States

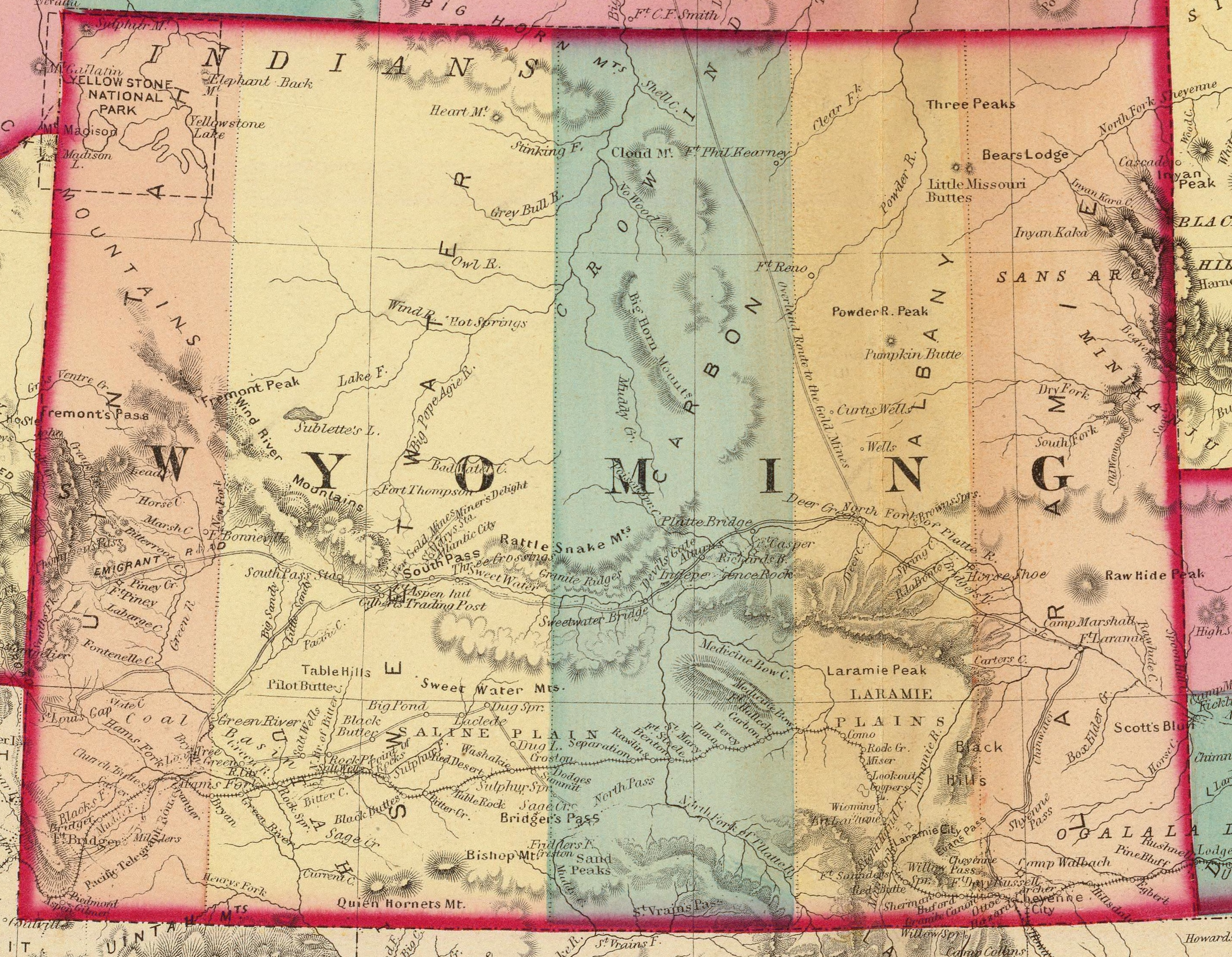
1872 Wyoming Territory, with Emigrant Trail and road to the Montana gold mines marked

The Emigrant Trail in Wyoming, which is the path followed by Western pioneers using the Oregon, California, and Mormon Trails (collectively referred to as the Emigrant Trails), spans 400 miles (640 km) through the U.S. state of Wyoming. The trail entered from Nebraska on the eastern border of the state near the present day town of Torrington and exited on the western border near the towns of Cokeville and Afton. An estimated 350,000 to 400,000 settlers traveled on the trail through Wyoming between 1841 and 1868. All three trails follow the same path through most of the state. The Mormon Trail splits at Fort Bridger and enters Utah, while the Oregon and California Trails continue to Idaho.

== North Platte River ==
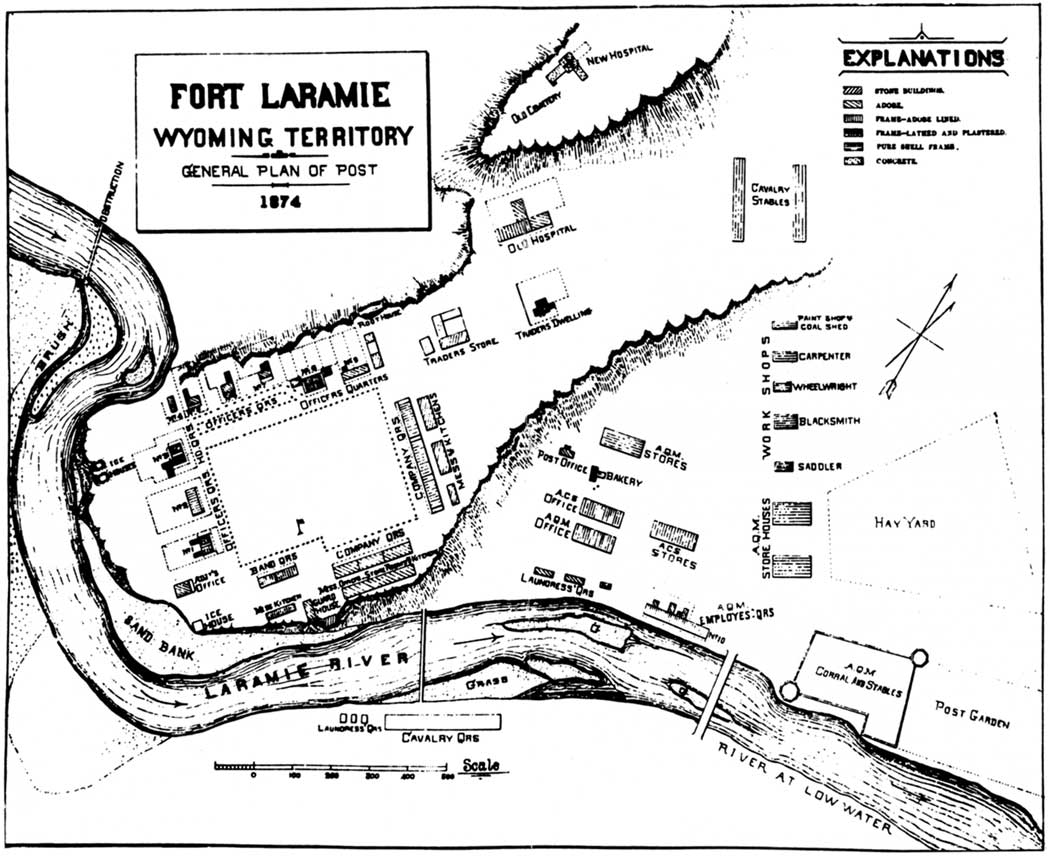
Plan of Fort Laramie

In the eastern plains, the Emigrant Trail follows the North Platte River into Wyoming. The trail follows the river upstream to Fort Laramie, a prominent military and trading post in the region. Prior to 1850 the northern side of the river was thought to be impassable beyond Fort Laramie, so the wagon trains that were traveling on the northern side of the river through Nebraska had to undertake a dangerous crossing at the fort. After crossing, trains on the main trail to the south of the river had to cross the North Platte again 100 miles (160 km) upstream. In 1850 several wagon trains successfully blazed a path along the northern side of the river. This new route, which reduced the risk and expense of crossing the river twice, was preferred for all subsequent traffic on the northern side of the river. The northern route is sometimes called Child's Route after Andrew Child who describe it in a guide book published in 1852. Above Fort Laramie, Child's Route follows the North Platte River through the present day town of Douglas, and near the site of Fort Fetterman which was built in 1867. This is the point at which the Wyoming section of the Bozeman Trail turned north to the gold fields of Montana in the 1860s.

The southern route also follows the river along the edge of the Laramie Mountains to an area near the current towns of Casper and Glenrock. In 1847, during the first Mormon emigration, Brigham Young established a ferry near present-day Casper known as Mormon Ferry. The next year the ferry was moved a few miles downriver. The ferry was free for Latter Day Saints, but charged a toll for other users. The ferry was manned by groups of Mormons every summer from 1848 until 1852. In 1853 John Baptiste Richard built a toll bridge near the ferry site, which would eventually put all ferries on the North Platte out of business. In 1859, Louis Guinard built the Platte Bridge near the site of the original Mormon Ferry. Guinard also built a trading post at one end of the bridge which eventually became Fort Caspar.

Famous landmarks along the southern route included Ayres Natural Bridge and Register Cliff, one of a number of locations along the trail in Wyoming where settlers carved their names.

== Sweetwater River ==
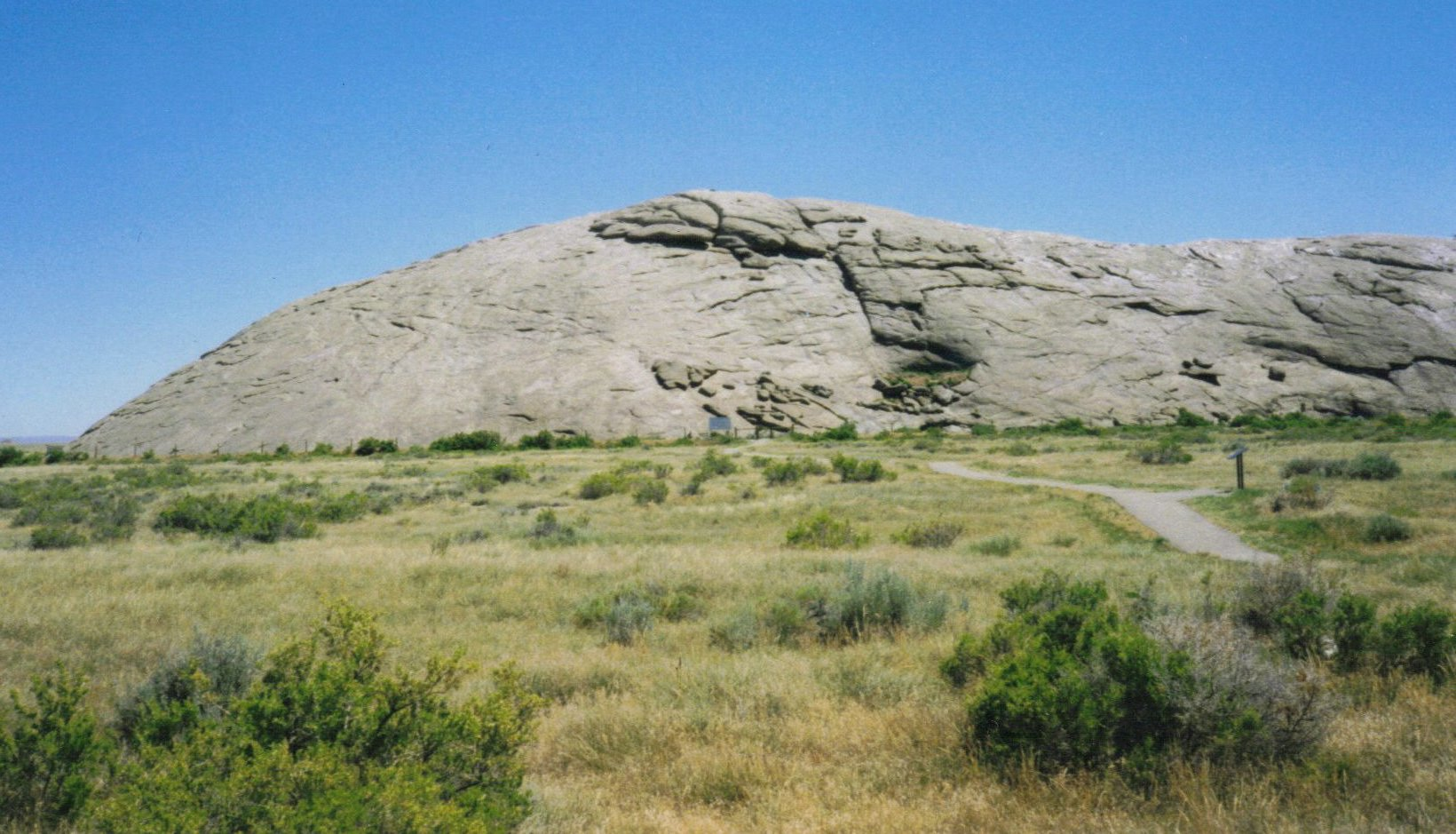
Independence Rock

Continuing upstream from Casper, the North Platte bends to the south. The original trail proceeded several miles along the river to Red Buttes, where a bend in the river formed a natural amphitheater dominated by red cliffs on the hill above. The river was easier to ford here for those who were unwilling or unable to pay to cross at one of the ferries downstream. This was the last good camp spot before leaving the river and entering the waterless stretch between the North Platte and the Sweetwater River. From here the settlers entered a difficult portion called Rock Avenue which moved from spring to spring across mostly alkaline soil and steep hills until it reached the Sweetwater River. Later settlers who had crossed to the northern side of the river at Casper would come to favor a route through a small valley called Emigrant Gap which headed directly to Rock Avenue, bypassing Red Buttes.

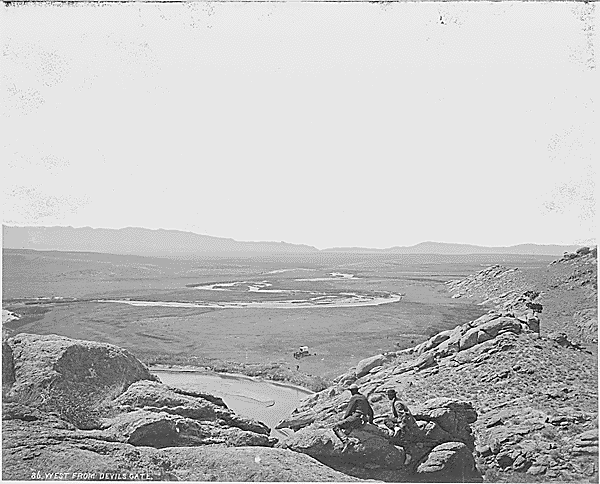
The Sweetwater River at Devil's Gate, 1870

Upon arrival in the Sweetwater valley, the trail encounters one of the most important landmarks on the trail, Independence Rock. Independence Rock was named because settlers tried to reach it by July 4 (Independence Day in the United States) in order to help ensure that they will be at their destinations in California or Oregon before the winter snows come. Many of the travelers left their names on the rock, either carved or painted on with axle grease. It is estimated that more than 50,000 signatures were inscribed on Independence Rock. Other notable landmarks along the Sweetwater valley include Split Rock, Devil's Gate and Martin's Cove, where, in November 1856, the Martin Handcart Company was stranded by heavy snow until a rescue party from Salt Lake City arrived.

The trail continues west along the Sweetwater River eventually crossing the meandering river nine times, including three times within a 2 miles (3.2 km) section through a narrow canyon in the Rattlesnake Hills. Prior to the 6th crossing, the trail crossed an unusual location known as Ice Slough. A covering of peat like vegetation grew over a small stream. The stream froze in winter and did not thaw until early summer due to the insulating layer of vegetation. The ice was a welcome treat for settlers who were enduring temperatures over 90 °F (32 °C) in July. The trail crosses the Sweetwater three more times and encounters a large hill known as Rocky Ridge on the northern side of the river. This barren and rocky section lasted almost 12 miles (19 km), and was considered a major obstacle in the trail. The same storm in November 1856 that debilitated the Martin Handcart Company also stranded the Willie Handcart Company on the eastern side of the ridge. Before rescuers could arrive, 21 people died in freezing temperatures. Following Rocky Ridge, the trail descends one more time into the Sweetwater valley to the ninth and final crossing of the Sweetwater at Burnt Ranch.

In 1853, a new route named the Seminoe Cutoff was established on the southern side of the river. It was named after trapper Basil LaJeunesse who was referred to as Seminoe by the Shoshone Indians. The Seminoe Cutoff split from the main trail at the 6th crossing and rejoined it at Burnt Ranch, bypassing both Rocky Ridge and four of the river crossings, which was an advantage in the early spring and summer during high runoff. The route was used extensively in the 1850s, especially by the Mormon companies.

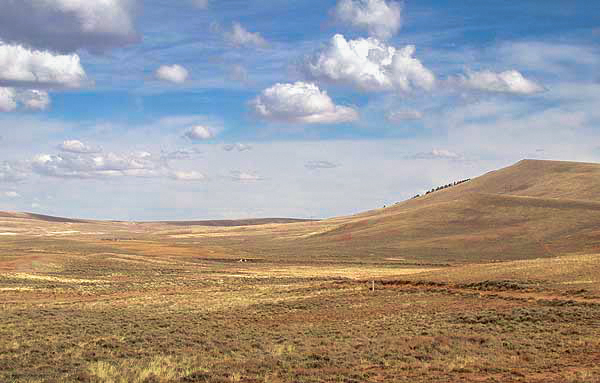
South Pass facing west toward Pacific Springs

Immediately after crossing the Sweetwater at Burnt Ranch the trail crosses the continental divide at South Pass, unarguably the most important landmark on the entire trail. South Pass itself is an unimpressive open saddle between the Wind River Range to the north and the Antelope Hills to the south, but it represented a major milestone in the trip. In 1848, Congress created the Oregon Territory which included all the territory in Wyoming west of the Continental Divide. Crossing South Pass meant that the settlers had truly arrived in the Oregon Territory, though their ultimate destination was still a great distance away. Nearby Pacific Springs offered the first water since the trail had left the Sweetwater River and marked the beginning of a relatively dry stretch of trail until the settlers reached the Green River more than 40 miles (64 km) away.

== Sandy River ==
Leaving Pacific Springs, the trail moves southwest alongside Pacific Creek for a short distance until it swoops to the west to intersect Dry Sandy creek, a small stream that is a tributary of the Little Sandy River which in turn flows into the Big Sandy River. True to its name, the water level on the Dry Sandy varied depending on the time of year and was often dry. South of the Dry Sandy ford, the trail split into two major sections, the main route which continues south to Fort Bridger, and the Sublette Cutoff, which proceeds west directly to the Green River and Bear River valleys, bypassing Fort Bridger. The point at which the trails diverge is known as Parting of the Ways. 11 miles (18 km) south the main trail fords the Little Sandy. Here, a secondary path to the Sublette Cutoff leads from the Little Sandy Pony Express station that was based here during the emigration period. The main trail goes on to ford the Big Sandy near the present day town of Farson. The trail proceeds along the northern side of the Big Sandy to its confluence with the Green River. Fording the Green River was very risky, so most travelers used one of a number of ferries operating on the Green River, including the Lombard Ferry and the Robinson Ferry.

== Fort Bridger ==
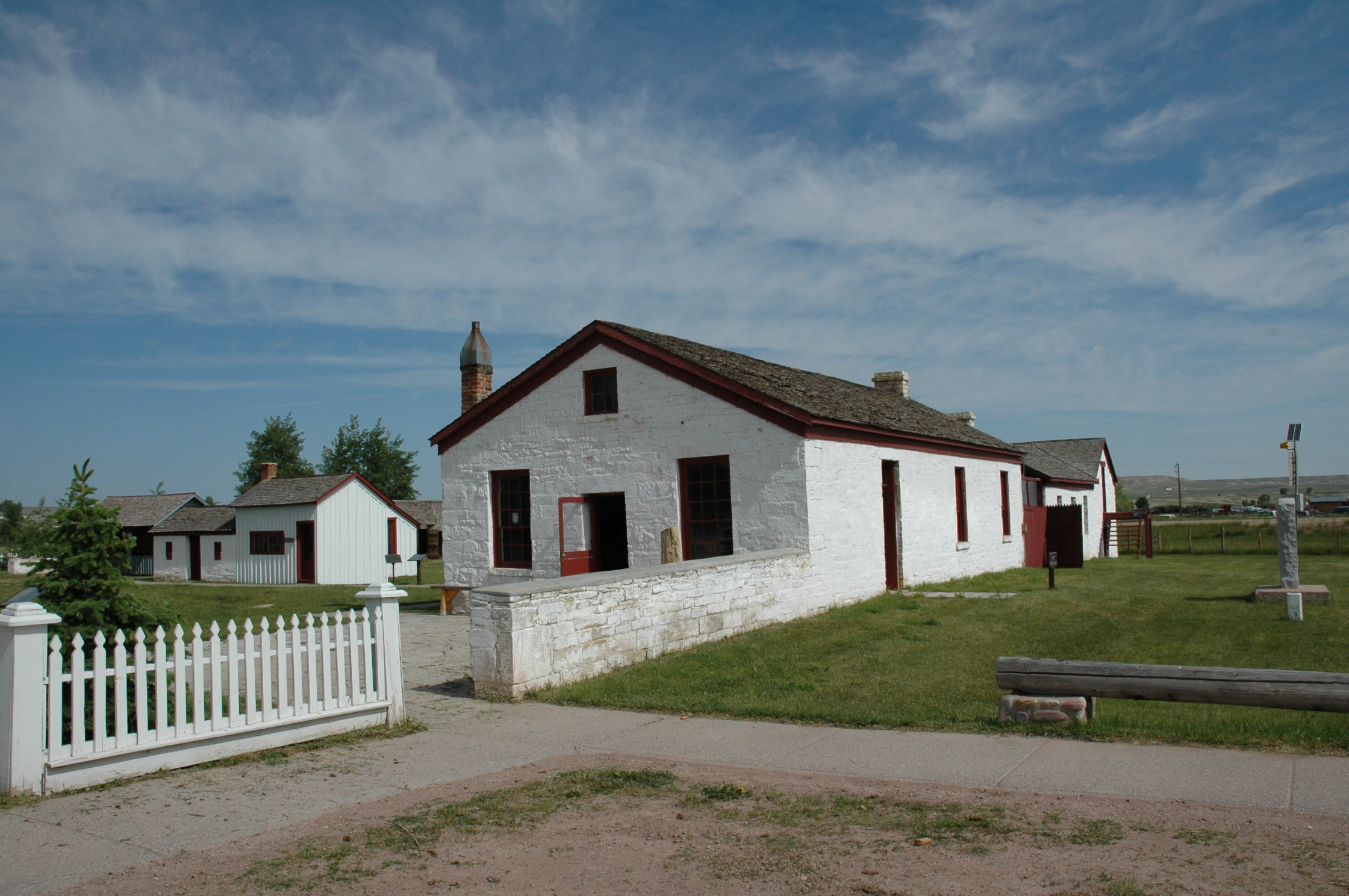
Fort Bridger

Continuing toward Fort Bridger from the Green River, the main trail crosses Hams Fork near Granger and followed Blacks Fork to Fort Bridger. Established in 1842 by legendary frontiersman Jim Bridger and his partner Louis Vasquez, Fort Bridger was a vital refueling post and a welcome rest after the particularly difficult journey from South Pass. Even after the Sublette Cutoff was established, settlers destined for Oregon who were low on livestock and supplies would bypass the cutoffs and make the longer trip to Fort Bridger to restock. Fort Bridger is the point at which the Mormon Trail splits from the Oregon Trail and California Trail for good. The Mormon Trail continues southwest, fording the Bear River and crossing into Utah south of the current town of Evanston. The other trails turn and proceed northwest, crossing the Bear River Divide and into the Bear River valley on the western side of the state. The trail meets the Sublette Cutoff near Cokeville and the rejoined trails follow the Bear River upstream and into Idaho, heading for Fort Hall.

== Sublette-Greenwood Cutoff ==
The Sublette-Greenwood Cutoff was opened in 1844 by the Stephens-Townsend-Murphy Party led by mountain men Caleb Greenwood and Isaac Hitchcock. Hitchcock, an old trapper and one of the first of his kind to have been in California in 1832, recommended that the wagon trail go due west from the Little Sandy and cross 40 miles (64 km) of desert territory to the Green River and from there cross the ridge into the Bear River Valley, completely bypassing Fort Bridger and the crossing of Bear River Ridge. The route shaved about 85 miles (137 km) and 7 days off the main route, but the decision to cross nearly 45 waterless miles before reaching the Green River was not one to be taken lightly. Settlers had to decide between time and the health of their livestock. A traveler in 1846 wrote:

We lay by preparing to Crossing the Cut off to Green river a distance of 40 miles without Wood or Water set out on the Journey at 3AM and landed on Green river the distance aforesaid at 3'Oclock of the 19th it being 24 hours drive

The route reached the height of popularity during the California Gold Rush of the 1850s when a desire to speed to the California gold fields outweighed the risks. The route was named the Sublette Cutoff by Joseph Ware in his popular 1849 guide book to the trail after an individual named Solomon Sublette (youngest brother of William Sublette) who told him about the route. The popularity of the guide book during the 1850s cemented the name, though most scholars today call it the Sublette-Greenwood Cutoff after its original discoverer.

As on the main route, several ferries operated where the cutoff crossed the Green River near the present day town of La Barge. Early settlers crossed the Names Hill Ford, which was barely passable when the water was low. Later The Names Hill Ferry offered a safer alternative. The nearby Mormon Ferry was located a mile upstream, and the Mountain Man Ferry operated during the Gold Rush days. West of the ford is its namesake, Names Hill, which is a prominent emigrant "recording area" with signatures and other carvings. One notable signature is James Bridger, 1844, Trapper. It is unclear if the signature is authentic, since Bridger was known to be illiterate. The hill also features Native American pictographs.

A secondary cutoff named the Slate Creek or Kinney Cutoff breaks from the main trail near the Lombard Ferry on the Green River, and meets the Sublette Cutoff on Slate Creek Ridge at Emigrant Springs. This route was slightly longer than the Sublette, but had the advantage of only 10 waterless miles rather than the 45 endured on the Sublette trail.

== Lander Cutoff ==
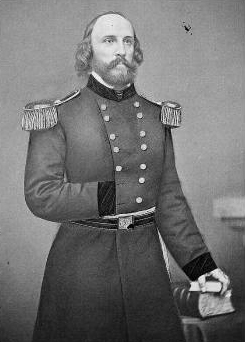
Frederick W. Lander

The Lander Road, located farther north than the main trail to Fort Hall, also bypassed Fort Bridger and was about 85 miles (137 km) shorter to Fort Hall. It was built under the supervision of Frederick W. Lander by federal contractors in 1858—one of the first federally sponsored roads in the west. Lander's Road officially was called the Fort Kearney, South Pass and Honey Lake Road and was a federally funded attempt to improve the Oregon and California trails. The little used Honey Lake part of the proposed route near the present states of Nevada and California border was improved in 1859 under Lander's direction but did not go much beyond improving some watering holes—work ceased in 1860. The "Lander Road" was the first section of the federally funded road through the future states of Wyoming and Idaho. Expeditions under the command of Frederick W. Lander surveyed a new route starting at Burnt Ranch following the last crossing of the Sweetwater River before it turned west over South Pass. The Lander Road followed the Sweetwater River further north, skirting the Wind River Range before turning west and crossing the continental divide north of South Pass.

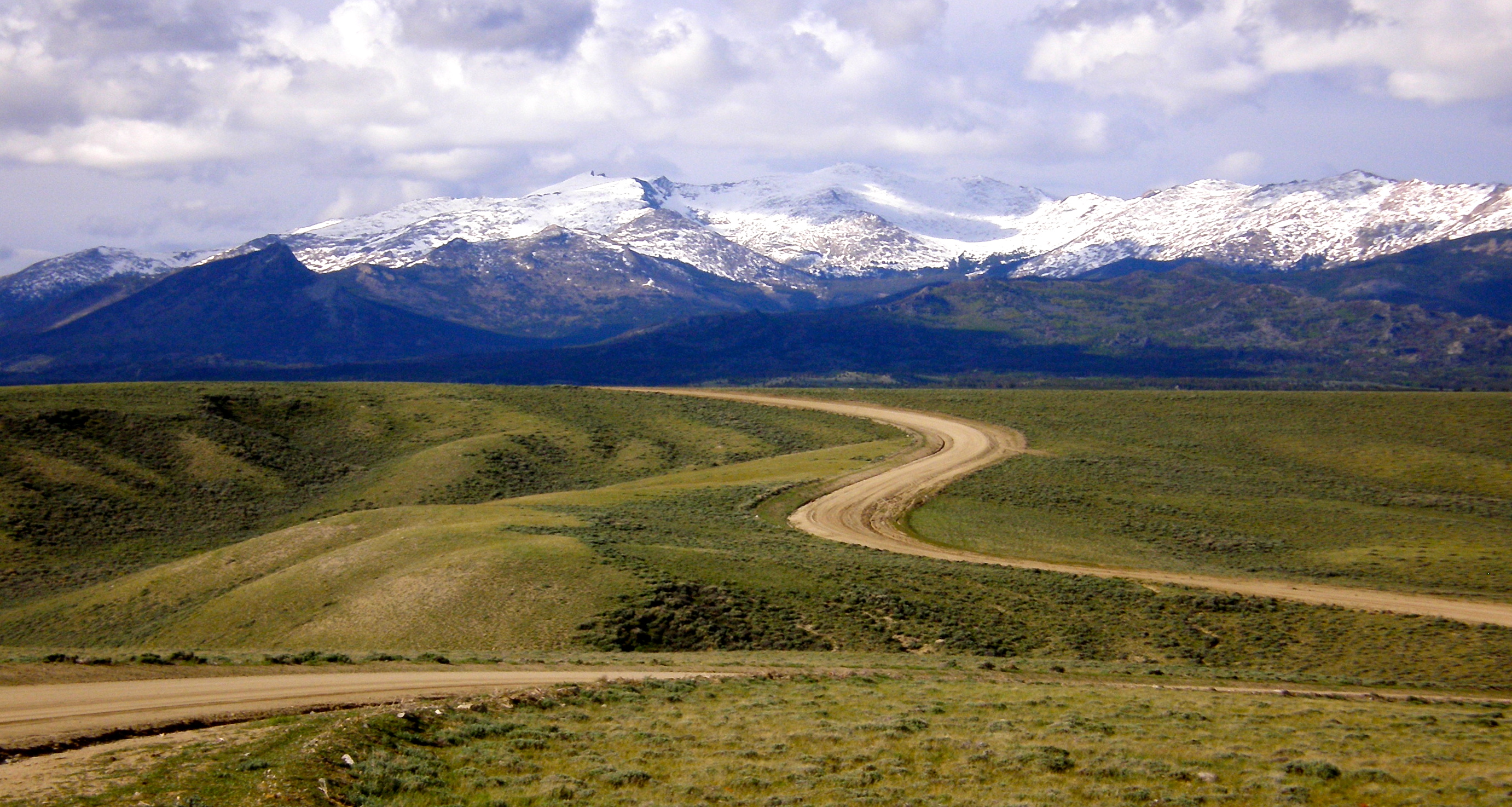
A panoramic view of the Wind River Range is seen from the current Lander Cut-off (June 15, 2011)

The road crossed the Green River near the present town of Big Piney, Wyoming, and then passing over 8,800-foot (2,700 m) Thompson Pass in the Wyoming Range near the head of the Grey's River and then crosses another high pass across the Salt River Range before descending into the Star Valley. The trail entered Star Valley about six miles (10 km) south of the present town of Smoot, Wyoming. From Smoot, the road then continued north about 20 miles (32 km) down Star Valley west of the Salt River before turning almost due west at Stump Creek near the present town of Auburn, Wyoming, and passing into the present state of Idaho and following the Stump Creek valley about 10 miles (16 km) northwest over the Caribou Range (this section of the trail is now accessible only by US Forest Service path as the main road (Wyoming Highway 34) now goes through Tincup canyon to get across the Caribous.) After crossing the Caribou Range the road split, turning almost 90 degrees and progressing southwest to Soda Springs, Idaho, or alternately heading almost due west and passing south of Grays Lake (now part of the Grays Lake National Wildlife Refuge) to Fort Hall. The Lander Road had good grass, fishing, water and wood but was high, rough and steep in many places. Later, after 1869, it was mostly used by ranchers moving their stock to and from summer grazing and/or markets. For maps of the Lander road in Wyoming and Idaho see NPS National Trail Map For more information visit Afton, Wyoming to see its Lander and Pioneer Museum.

By crossing the lush Wyoming and Salt River Ranges instead of circling via the deserts to the south, the route provided ample wood, grass and water for the travelers, and cut nearly seven days off the total travel time for wagon trains going to Fort Hall. Despite the better conditions for livestock, the mountainous terrain and unpredictable weather made passage sometimes difficult and required continuing federally funded maintenance on the mountainous road—not a sure thing just before, during and after the American Civil War. Funds were appropriated in 1858 and 115 men (hired in Utah) completed the road in Wyoming and Idaho in 90 days, clearing timber and moving about 62,000 cubic yards (47,000 m^{3}) of earth. The Lander's road or cutoff opened in 1859 when it was extensively used. Records after 1859 are lacking and its use after that period are assumed to sharply decrease since the Sublette Cutoff, the Central Overland Route and other cutoffs were just about as fast or faster and were much less strenuous. Today the Lander Cutoff road(s) are roughly followed by a series of county and Forest Service roads.
