= Johnston Scout Rocks =

Historic rocks in Wyoming, US

- U.S. National Register of Historic Places
- Location: Approximately 1 mile (1.6 km) south of Emigrant Springs
- Nearest city: Kemmerer, Wyoming
- Built: 1850
- NRHP reference No.: 76001957
- Added to NRHP: November 7, 1976

The Johnston Scout Rocks near Kemmerer, Wyoming are a pair of sandstone rocks that have significance from 1850. They are listed on the National Register of Historic Places in the category of "Recreation and Culture" with historic subfunction "Work of art (sculpture, carving, rock art)".

The rocks are close to Emigrant Springs, a camping area of many wagon trains headed to Oregon or California. There are names of emigrants carved on the rocks. Included is a carving "T.C. Johnston, L.A. Cary 1860 Scout". In a 1986 Bureau of Land Management plan, intentions were stated to fence off the site and to treat the sandstone to stabilize the carvings.

Johnston Scout Rocks was listed on the National Register of Historic Places in 1976.
