= J. C. Penney Historic District =

Historic district in Wyoming, United States

- U.S. National Register of Historic Places
- U.S. National Historic Landmark District
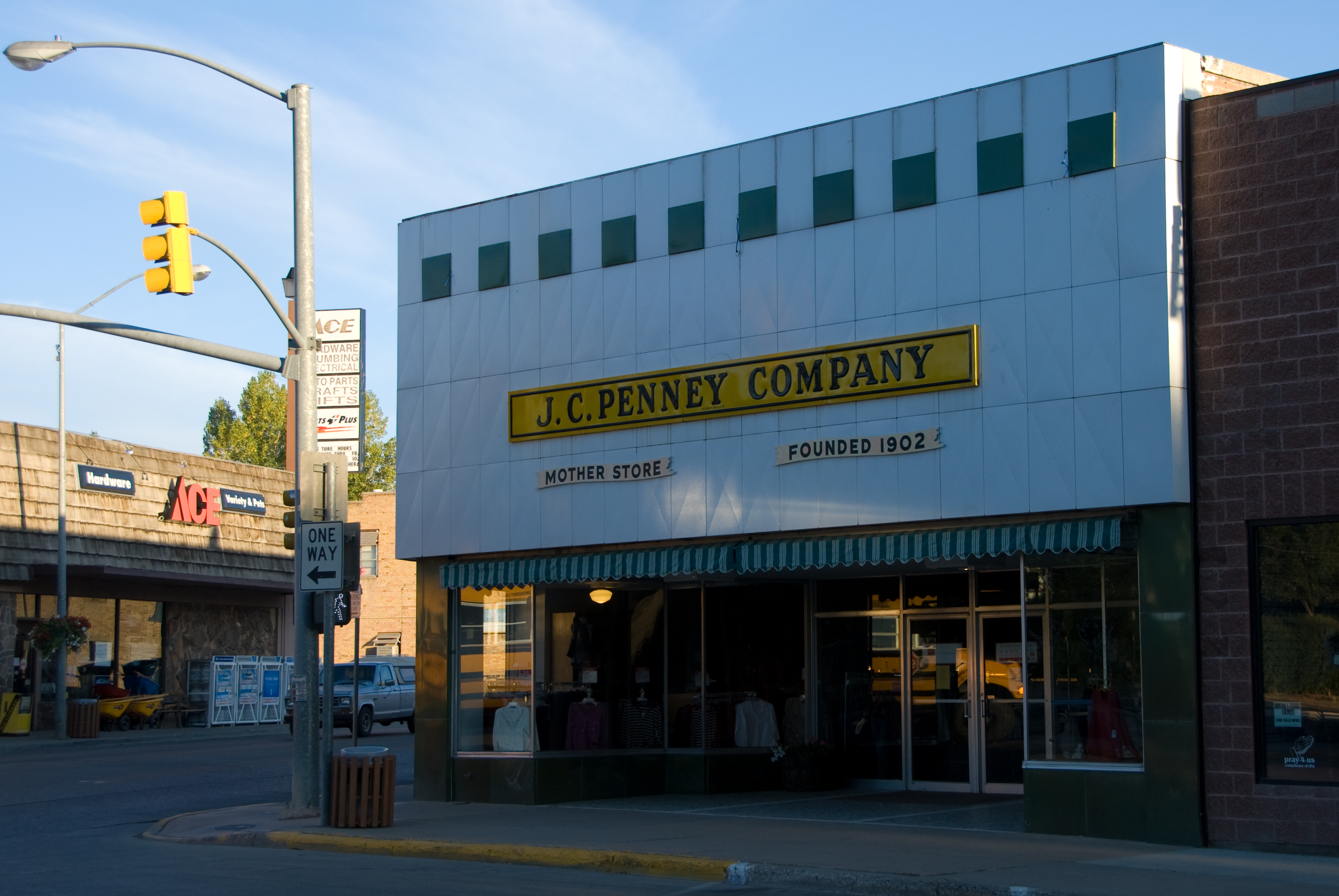
- JCPenney mother store (not the landmarked original building)

- Location within Wyoming Location within the United States
- Location: J. C. Penney Ave. and S. Main St., Kemmerer, Wyoming
- Coordinates: 41°47′41″N 110°32′13″W
- Area: 1.2 acres (0.49 ha)
- Built: 1902
- NRHP reference No.: 78002830

Significant dates
- Added to NRHP: June 2, 1978
- Designated NHLD: June 2, 1978

The J. C. Penney Historic District is a historic district in Kemmerer, Wyoming, encompassing several properties associated with James Cash Penney (1875-1971). The district includes the Golden Rule Store, the first in what became the J. C. Penney department store chain, and Penney's home during the store's early years. The district was declared a National Historic Landmark District in 1978, for Penney's role in creating one of the first national department store chains.

== Description and history ==
The J. C. Penney Historic District is located on the southern edge of downtown Kemmerer, encompassing about 1.2 acres (0.49 ha) at the junction of JC Penney Drive and South Main Street. Located along the southeast side of South Main Street at this junction are two commercial buildings, of which the one on the right was the original "mother store" of the J. C. Penney department store chain. Both are two-story structures, the one on the left sporting a typical Western false front in front of a gabled roof. The Penney store building is built of stone and has a facade of marble and cast iron, with a flat roof. The district originally included a third commercial building which flanked the Penney store on its right; this building has been demolished.

Across JC Penney Drive from the two commercial buildings is a small park, in which stands the J. C. Penney House, now a historic house museum. It is a small 1-1/2 story frame house, with a gabled roof and clapboarded exterior. It was probably built about 1900, and was home to the Penney family from 1902 to 1909. It remained Penney's property until his death in 1971.

James Cash Penney, a native of Missouri, began retailing in 1895 as a clerk in various dry goods retailers. Eventually taken into partnership with one of his employers, he opened the "Golden Rule Store" in Kemmerer in 1902 at a different location on Pine Street (no longer standing). The store quickly outgrew that space, and in 1904 he moved into the left side of this building, eventually taking it over. By 1907 he had bought out his original business partners, and opened two more stores. This was the start of a business empire that had more than $5 billion in sales in the 1970s. Penney's success was eventually emulated by other firms, notably the mail-order retailers Sears, Roebuck and Montgomery Ward, which also eventually built nationwide retail chains.

The retailer continues to operate a store in Kemmerer; it is located a short distance away from the historic district, at JC Penney Drive and Pine Avenue.

== See also ==
- J.C. Penney House
