= Fossil Oregon Short Line Depot =

- U.S. National Register of Historic Places
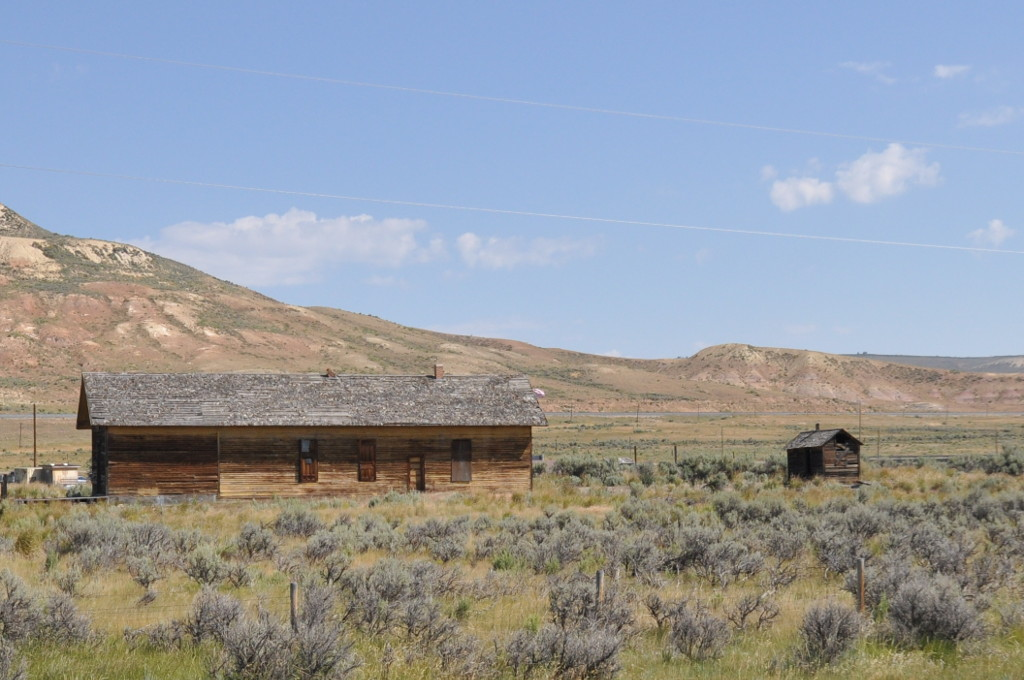

- Location within Wyoming Location within the United States
- Location: Approx. .4 mi. WNW. of the Jct. of US 30 & Cty. Rd. 300, Kemmerer, Wyoming
- Coordinates: 41°49′00″N 110°43′36″W
- NRHP reference No.: 13000919
- Added to NRHP: December 11, 2013

Fossil Oregon Short Line Depot in Kemmerer, Wyoming was listed on the National Register of Historic Places in 2013.

The station was moved to its current location in 1902 due to trains overshooting it at its previous location due to too much slope; the entire town of Fossil moved along with the station. It is located about .4 mi. WNW of the junction of US 30 and County Rd. 300. The station is a 24 by 80 feet (7.3 m × 24.4 m) variation on the standard Union Pacific 24x64 plan, expanded to be longer in 1902 after the move. A Western Union Telegraph office was located in the station, in addition to the depot having a passenger area, a freight storage area, and living quarters for the station master and his family.

The listing also includes an outhouse/coal storage outbuilding.

Preceding station	Union Pacific Railroad	Following station
Cokeville toward Portland	Portland – Granger	Nutria toward Granger
