= Emigrant Springs =

- U.S. National Register of Historic Places
- Nearest city: Kemmerer, Wyoming
- Area: 9 acres (3.6 ha)
- Built: 1843
- NRHP reference No.: 76001956
- Added to NRHP: January 11, 1976

Emigrant Springs, in Lincoln County, Wyoming near Kemmerer, was an important camping ground area of wagon trains on the Emigrant Trail headed for California or Oregon, and is now a historic site listed on the National Register of Historic Places.

It is located on a "main branch" of the Sublette Cutoff of the Emigrant Trail, where the slightly longer but better watered Slate Creek Cutoff rejoins the Sublette Cutoff. It is named for a spring feeding Emigrant Creek, which empties into Slate Creek. It is located in a hollow and has also been known as Indian Springs.

The Emigrant Trail splits further west into trails to California vs. to Oregon. A different Emigrant Springs in Oregon is located on the Oregon Trail.

Significance of this Wyoming site dates to 1843.

The NRHP listing recognizes carvings on rock and gravesites in a 9-acre (3.6 ha) area containing two separate contributing sites. Emigrant Springs was listed on the National Register of Historic Places in 1976.

== See also ==
- Johnston Scout Rocks, a nearby NRHP-listed site with rock carvings
