= J.C. Penney House =

Historic house in Wyoming, United States

- U.S. National Register of Historic Places
- U.S. National Historic Landmark District – Contributing property
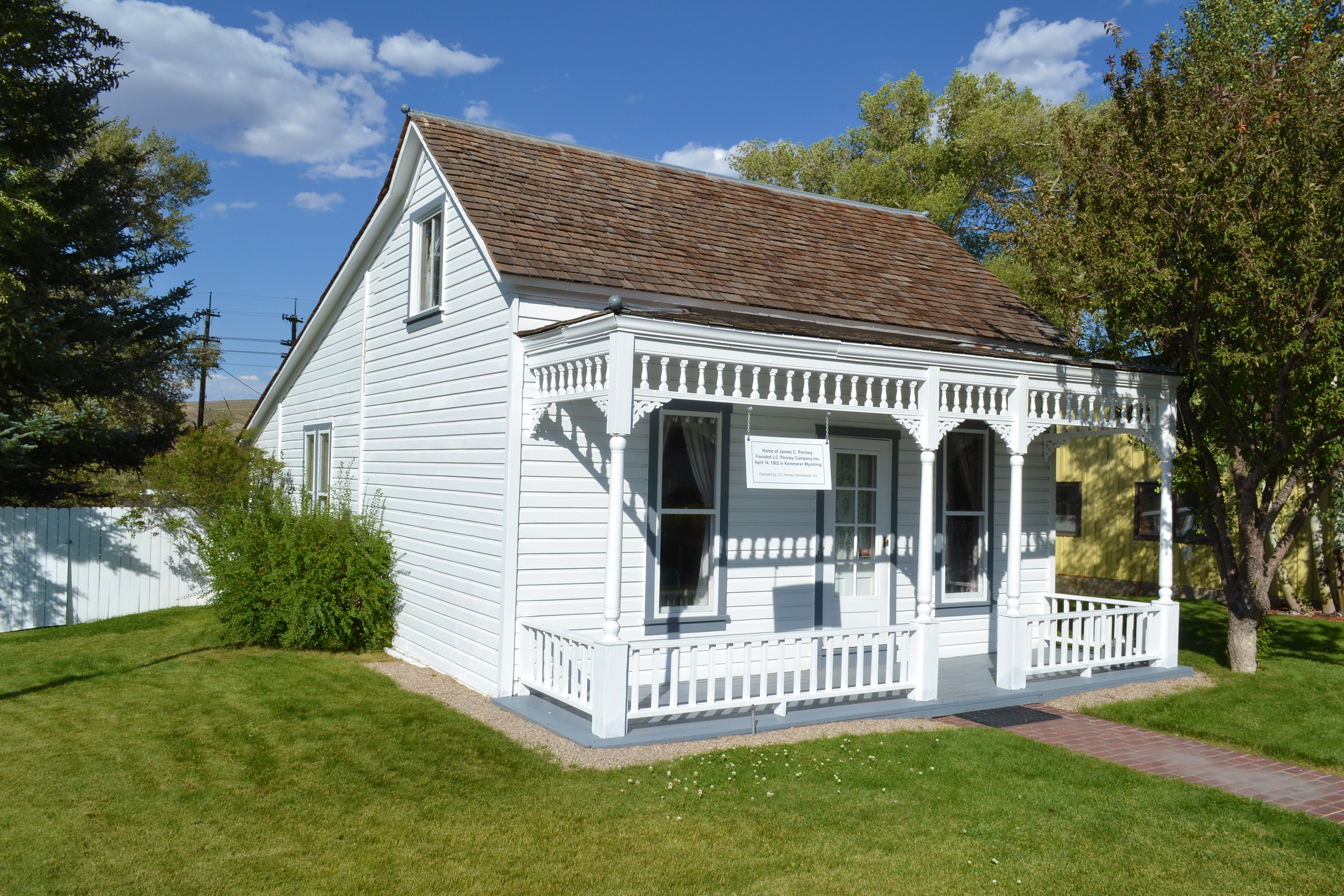

- Location within Wyoming Location within the United States
- Location: Railroad Park, Kemmerer, Wyoming
- Coordinates: 41°47′43″N 110°32′8″W
- Area: less than one acre
- Built: 1904
- Part of: J. C. Penney Historic District (ID78002830)
- NRHP reference No.: 76001958

Significant dates
- Added to NRHP: June 18, 1976
- Designated NHLDCP: June 2, 1978

The J.C. Penney House in Kemmerer, Wyoming, was the home of James Cash Penney, the founder of the J. C. Penney department stores, during the 1904-1909 period that he developed his formula for a successful dry goods store. Penney and wife moved to Kemmerer in 1902 and lived in the garret of a small house. With a child, it was too small, and Penney bought this two-storey house in 1904. It was small, too: about 25 feet (7.6 m) wide and sloping down to the back, going about 30 feet (9.1 m) deep.

During this period he was operating the "mother store" of the future J. C. Penney empire.

It is now operated as a house museum at least during the summer.

It was listed on the National Register of Historic Places in 1976, and is a contributing property to the J. C. Penney Historic District, a National Historic Landmark.

== See also ==
- J. C. Penney Historic District
