= Pacific Creek (Sweetwater County, Wyoming) =

Location
- Country: United States
- State: Wyoming

Physical characteristics
- Source
  - location: South Pass, Wyoming
  - coordinates: 42°19′44″N 108°52′13″W
- Mouth: Little Sandy Creek
  - location: Farson, Wyoming
  - coordinates: 42°07′37″N 109°23′43″W
- Length: 36 mi (58 km)

Basin features
- Tributaries
  - left: Morrow Creek

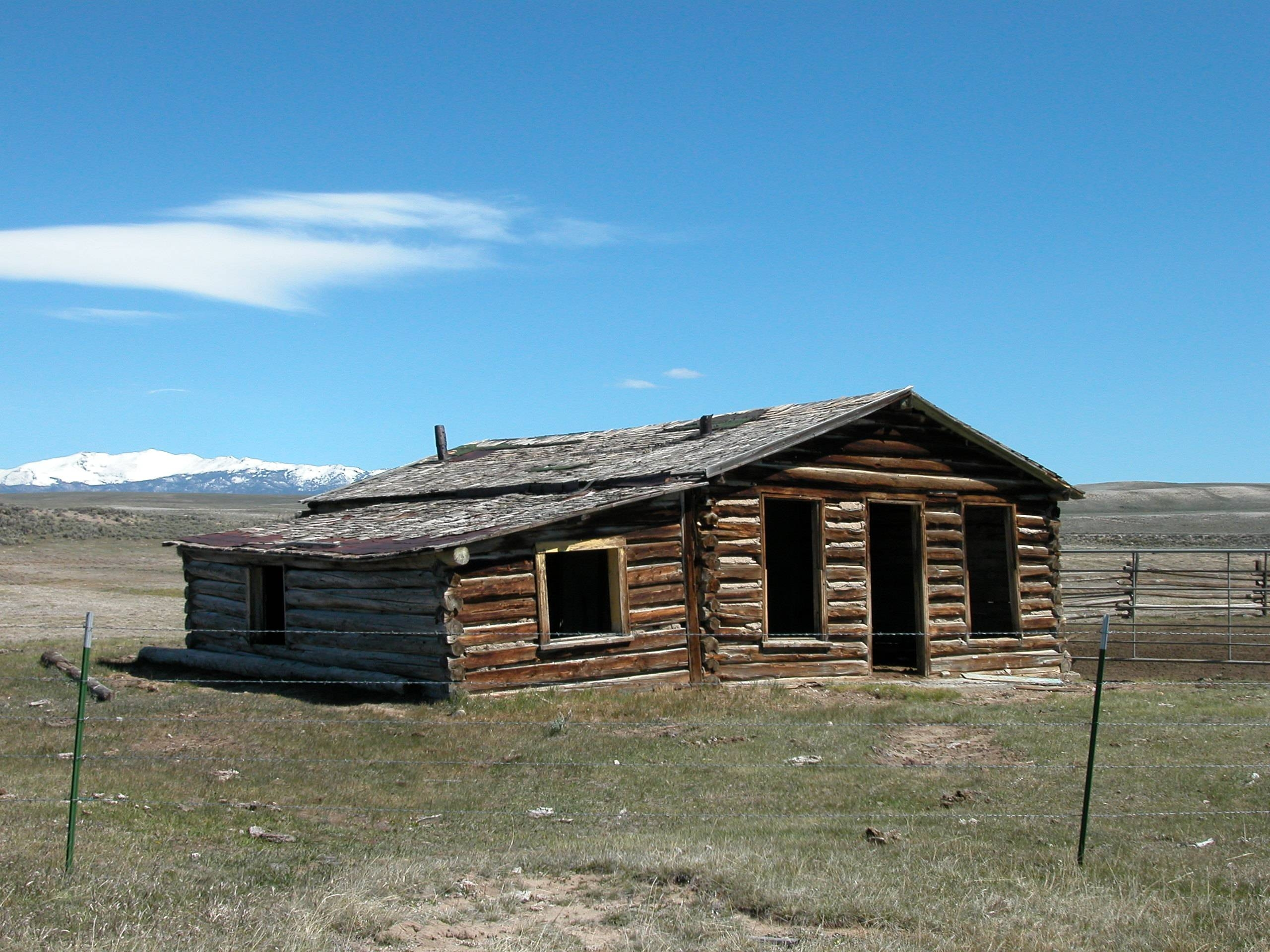
Remains of the old hotel and Pony rider station at Pacific Springs in southwestern Wyoming

Pacific Creek is a stream in the U.S. state of Wyoming. The approximately 36-mile (58 km) long stream rises on the western side of South Pass and flows into the Little Sandy Creek near Farson, Wyoming. As the name implies, the stream starts just to the west of the Continental Divide and so is on the Pacific side of the divide. The waters from the stream eventually flow into the Pacific Ocean via the Green River and Colorado River. The stream is a notable landmark on the Oregon, California and Mormon emigration trails.

== Tributaries ==
Morrow Creek is a left tributary arising in the desert Lucite Hills on the Continental Divide about 20 miles (32 km) south of South Pass. Morrow Creek joins Pacific Creek just over halfway through its journey.

== History ==
South Pass was first discovered by European-American traders in 1812; the first wagon trains crossed in 1832. Pacific Creek was the first water that the trains encountered after leaving the Sweetwater River at Burnt Ranch on the eastern side of the pass. Many wagon trains took the opportunity to camp and refresh at Pacific Springs, which is the first significant feeder into Pacific Creek. After leaving Pacific Creek, the wagon trains entered a dry stretch of the trail with the next good water nearly 40 miles (64 km) away at the Green River.

== See also ==
- Emigrant Trail in Wyoming
