= Haddenham Cabin =

Historic house in Wyoming, United States

- U.S. National Register of Historic Places
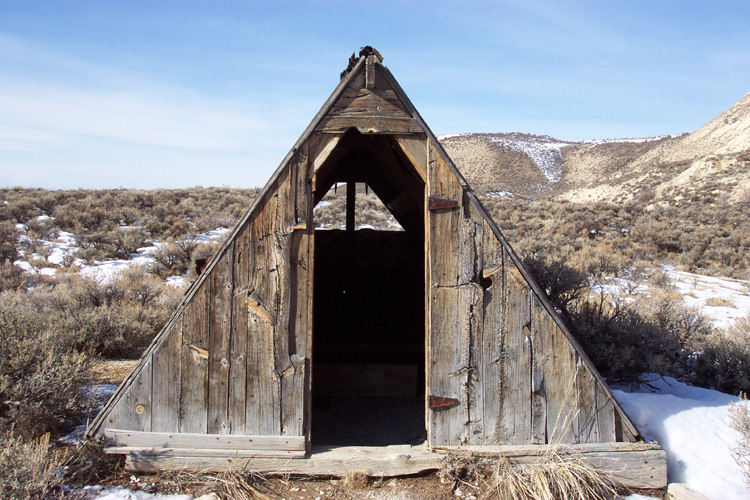
- Photo in 2004

- Location within Wyoming Location within the United States
- Nearest city: Kemmerer, Wyoming
- Coordinates: 41°49′49″N 110°43′52″W
- Area: less than one acre
- Built: c.1918
- Built by: Haddenham, David C.
- Architectural style: A-frame cabin
- NRHP reference No.: 03001339
- Added to NRHP: December 23, 2003

The Haddenham Cabin, located in Fossil Butte National Monument near Kemmerer, Wyoming, United States, is a historic cabin that is listed on the National Register of Historic Places (NRHP).

It is an A-frame cabin that was designed and built c. 1918 by David C. Haddenham. It is notable for association with fossil quarrying in the Green River Formation; from seasonal work at this site Haddenham provided specimens of rare fossils to universities, museums, and private collectors. Located on the Quarry Trail, a 2.5 mile trail to Fossil Butte, once the center of a prehistoric lake; the cabin is about 2000 feet east of the fossil quarry.

It was listed on the NRHP in 2003. A photo accompanying its NRHP nomination shows an adjacent historic marker describing it as a fossil hunter's home.
