= Great Basin Murders =

Unsolved series of murders

Great Basin Killer
- Other name: "The Great Basin Murderer"

Details
- Victims: 9+
- Span of crimes: 1983–1997
- Country: United States
- States: Wyoming; Utah; Nevada; Idaho

The Great Basin Murders is the name given to a series of murders of at least nine women committed between 1983 and 1997 across the states of Wyoming, Utah, Nevada, and Idaho. It is named after the Great Basin geographical area since most of the victims had their bodies dumped near interstate highways that traverse through it.

Most victims were teenage or adult females who were sexually assaulted then murdered – either by strangulation, stabbing, or shooting – and then abandoned on hilltops, deserted expanses, snowdrifts, or rivers. Some of their bodies were posed post-mortem. This initially led to speculation that all killings were the work of a single serial killer, who was nicknamed "The Great Basin Killer". This assertion has since been abandoned, as over the years it has been established that multiple unrelated serial killers operated in the area and that a majority of the killings were committed by different perpetrators. Of the nine murders linked to the Great Basin Murders, nearly half of the cases (Lisa Kimmell, married couple Patricia Walsh and Douglas Scott Zyskowski, Barbara Kaye Williams and Irene Vasquez) were solved with convictions of their killers. The remainder are unsolved and may be the work of one or more killers.

== Murders ==
The initial list of victims included the following nine victims:

- According to investigators, 23-year-old Janelle Johnson was the first victim. On February 17, 1983, Johnson was hitchhiking from Denver, Colorado to Riverton, Wyoming. She was last seen at a truck stop in Sinclair, Wyoming, at approximately 9 pm. She was found raped and murdered in Fremont County, Wyoming on March 1, 1983. After murdering her, her killer buried Johnson's corpse in a shallow grave, but storm drains soon partially eroded the grave site. While examining her body, forensic scientists found traces of seminal fluid believed to belong to the perpetrator, as well as bite marks on one of her shoulders, from which an impression was made. Johnson's killer is still unidentified, as the samples of her killer's bodily fluids became unusable for testing after the refrigerator in which they were stored broke down.
- The second victim was 18-year-old Lisa Marie Kimmell, who went missing on March 25, 1988, while traveling from Denver, Colorado, to Billings, Montana. She was driving a black 1988 Honda CR-X with Montana license plates and "LIL MISS" written on it. Her relatives told law enforcement officials that shortly before her death, she had an offer for a supervisory position at a fast food restaurant, after which she planned to move to Aurora, Colorado. Eight days after her disappearance, two fishermen found her body in the North Platte River near Casper, Wyoming. A forensic examination determined that she had been raped, beaten and stabbed to death. Despite the fact that Kimmell's body was discovered eight days after her disappearance, it was established that she had been killed approximately hours before her body was found in the river, leading local authorities to believe that she was held captive by her killer. In addition to the stab wounds and bruises, the girl's body showed ligature marks on her wrists and ankles. After she was buried, a note signed "Stringfellow Hawke" was found on Kimmell's grave. Dale Wayne Eaton was convicted of her murder in 2004.
- Vicky Lynn Perkins, 19, went missing in March 1989. She was last seen in Portland, Oregon. Her highly decomposed body was discovered months later, on May 13, 1989, in Emery County, Utah, not far from I-70. Despite the fact that the remains were mostly skeletal, police were able to identify the victim as Perkins through fingerprints. A sheriff described Perkins as "a known prostitute" who was "working as a hooker at truck stops."
- On October 26, 1990, deer hunters discovered skeletal remains in Millard County, Utah. At the time, the victim could not be identified and was known under the name "Jane Doe 1" for the next 13 years. In May 2003 that forensic scientists from the University of Arizona, after comparing X-rays of the victim's jaw, were they able to identify her as 24-year-old Patricia Candace Walsh. Walsh and her 26-year-old husband Douglas Scott Zyskowski, both from Seattle, Washington, went missing shortly after leaving the city in 1989. Zyskowski's remains were discovered in January 1990 in Ozona, Texas, near I-10, and he was identified in 1992. It was later revealed in 2012 that Patricia Walsh and Douglas Zyskowski were both killed by Robert Ben Rhoades.
- Ermalinda Garza Sherman, 32, was found murdered in St. George, Utah, on April 2, 1991. She had been shot multiple times in the head. A forensic examination later determined that she had been severely beaten and suffered severe head trauma before her death. Forensicists estimated that Garza had been murdered about 30 minutes before her body was discovered, but no witnesses were located.
- On March 22, 1991, the extremely decomposed body of a young woman was found in Salt Lake City, Utah. She could not be identified at the time of her discovery, and was known as "Jane Doe 2". She was later identified as Barbara Kaye Williams.

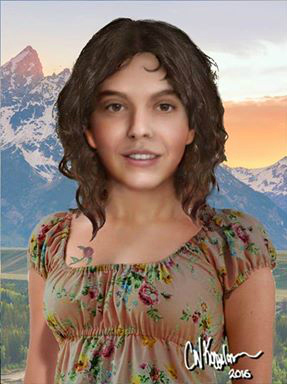
Digital reconstruction by Carl Koppelman of Irene Vasquez, nicknamed "Bitter Creek Betty" while unidentified.

- An unidentified young woman, nicknamed "Bitter Creek Betty", was found on March 1, 1992, in the Bitter Creek stream near Sweetwater County, Wyoming. The medical examiner who conducted the autopsy suggested that the victim's body had been left near I-80 between mid-October 1991 and late February 1992. Her body was well-preserved due to low temperatures and heavy snow. She had dark hair and dark-colored eyes, was approximately 5 ft 8 in (173 cm) and weighed 125 pounds (57 kg). Her age at the time of her death is believed to have been between 24 and 32. The victim had a rose tattoo on her right breast and a Caesarean section scar on her abdomen. A gold ring was on one finger of her right hand and a gold necklace was around her neck. The victim had been brutally beaten, raped, and strangled before she died, but the cause of death was a blow to the head with an ice pick, which caused cranial trauma and severe blood loss. According to investigators, the victim fiercely resisted her attacker and likely wounded him, as traces of blood not matching her blood group were found at the crime scene. Photos of her face, tattoos and other distinctive features were published by police in local media in an attempt to identify her - soon afterwards, they were contacted by a man who stated that he had seen a woman with a similar tattoo in Tucson, Arizona, but this led nowhere. In 2022, Bitter Creek Betty was positively identified. In 2025, Cowboy State Daily released her name as Irene Vasquez; she had been last heard from by her half sister in 1990.

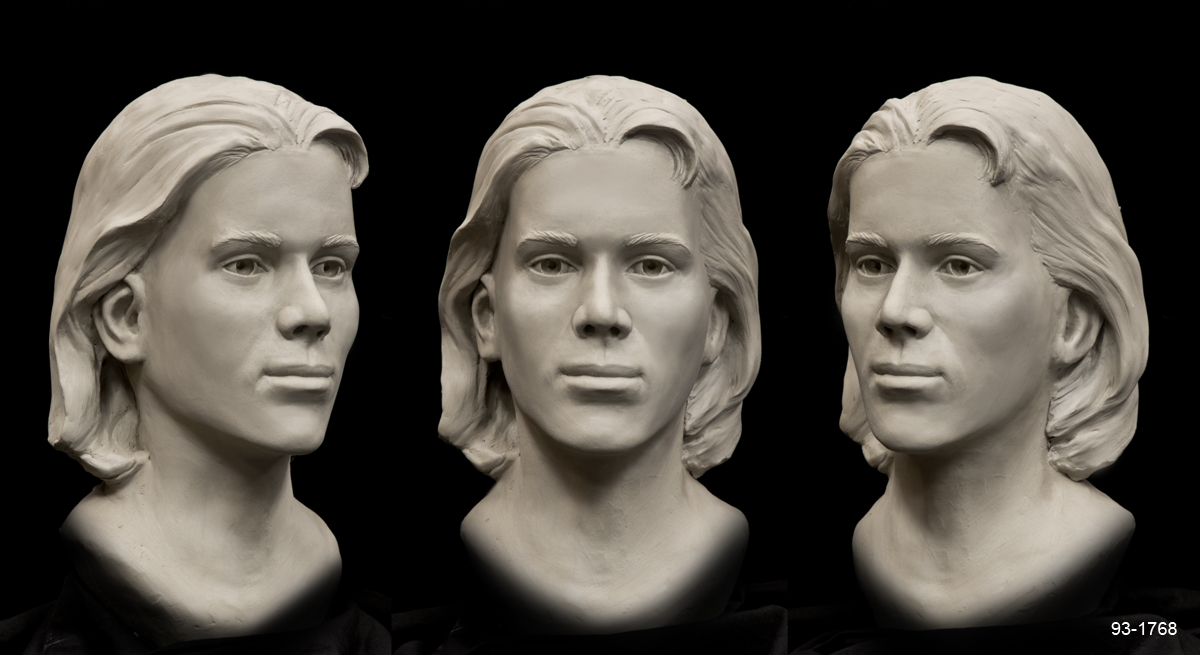
Reconstruction of Shafter Jane Doe

- A motorist discovered the nude body of another unidentified young woman on November 16, 1993, near the I-80 exit for Shafter, Nevada in Elko County, Nevada. Her nicknames became the "Shafter Jane Doe" and the "Elko County Jane Doe". The coroner who conducted the autopsy established that she had been murdered five or six days prior. There was traces in her system of alcohol and marijuana. Investigators found drag marks on the ground near the crime scene, leading them to believe that she was killed elsewhere and then dumped at the I-80 exit. Analysis of the geometry of the tire tread patterns determined that her killer was traveling in a medium or large vehicle, possibly a pickup truck or van. The killer had posed her naked body on its back and by spreading the corpse's arms and legs in order to resemble a cross. Jane Doe had been beaten before she died, but the cause of death was two gunshot wounds to the chest. Forensics were able to extract only a partial right thumb fingerprint, but there has been no fingerprint database matches. The woman had all 32 teeth in her mouth, all of which were in excellent condition except for a root canal in process. Jane Doe had blond hair and brown eyes, and was about 140 pounds (64 kg) and 5 ft 7 in (170 cm) tall. Analysis of her teeth indicated an age of 27–28 at death. She had a scar on her right shin and both earlobes were pierced, but police found no earrings at the crime scene. A Utah crime labs analysis of isotopes from her hair samples indicated that the victim had spent the last seven months of her life in Star Valley in Lincoln County, Wyoming.

On June 3, 2026, the Elko County Sheriff's Office published a Facebook post indicating that in October 2025, they had identified the "Shafter Jane Doe" body as Marion Hertha Alexander. The woman had never been reported missing because she was a "free-spirited individual who became estranged from her family" and considered to be a drifter. The Sheriff's Office believed that there was sufficient evidence to charge a suspect with homicide, but the suspect died November 13, 2025 before he could be questioned or arrested.

- Tonya Teske, 18, was murdered on August 15, 1997. Her fully nude corpse was discovered in Ucon, Idaho, and was identified after her photograph was spread around truck stops and public areas. A resident of Shoshoni, Wyoming, Teske was a known prostitute who had dropped out of school in 1995 and was known to travel out-of-state with her clients, most of whom were truck drivers. On August 10, several witnesses saw her leaving Shoshoni in the company of at least four men, all of whom appeared to be in their early 50s. Friends and acquaintances claimed that Teske had told them she wanted to move to Salt Lake City, Utah. Two days before her death, she had been arrested and questioned by police in Belgrade, Montana, on charges of prostitution and theft, but she was released due to lack of evidence - at the same time, she was also sought by authorities in Utah County, Utah, for forgery. During the investigation, the suspect in her murder was an Idaho truck driver who, according to witness accounts, had been seen with Teske in Billings, Montana, between August 10 and 13, and was supposedly one of the last people to see her alive. No evidence implicating him in the murder has ever surfaced, he was never charged and his name was never released to the public.

== Investigation, suspects, and convictions ==
During the investigation, police interviewed several hundred prostitutes, pimps, service station workers, and truck drivers in an effort to find witnesses to the crimes and identify the perpetrator. Over the years, several people have been identified as suspects. No suspects have been publicly identified in the murders of Johnson, Perkins, Garza or Teske.

=== Scott William Cox ===
In early 1992, 28-year-old Scott William Cox, a resident of Portland, Oregon, became a suspect. In late 1991, he was arrested on charges of murdering two prostitutes in Portland in 1990 and 1991, respectively. As a truck driver, Cox, from the mid-1980s until his arrest, had visited many states across the country and was seen in places where girls and women were murdered. He was suspected of committing 20 total murders, with investigators believing that he was responsible for killing Perkins, herself a resident of Portland. After being charged with the murders of the two prostitutes, the task force gathered information about Cox's whereabouts over the previous few years through driver's timesheets, payment information from his credit cards and the owners of motels he had stayed at, but found no evidence implicating him in any of the Great Basin Murders.

=== Keith Hunter Jesperson ===
In 1995, serial killer Keith Hunter Jesperson became the prime suspect. Since 1990, he had killed at least eight girls and women across five states, including some of the states in which Great Basin Murder victims had been found. He was investigated for any possible involvement, but was soon ruled out.

=== Howell Williams ===
In 1999, "Jane Doe 2" was identified as Barbara Kaye Williams, and her husband, Howell Williams, immediately became a suspect in her murder. He had numerous convictions from his home state of Florida, and in the late 1990s, he was returned there for parole violations. In April 1999, he was extradited from Florida to Utah, where he was tried and convicted of his wife's murder. He was also investigated for potential involvement in the other murders, but no evidence implicating him was ever located and he was never charged.

=== Dale Wayne Eaton ===
In July 2002, 57-year-old Dale Wayne Eaton, a former resident of Moneta, Wyoming, became the prime suspect in the killings. Having grown up in poverty in Greeley, Colorado, he had a criminal record dating back to the early 1960s and showed signs of mental illness, due to which he had to spend time at a psychiatric facility in Colorado. Eaton's mother was a schizophrenic, while both of his brothers also suffered from mental illnesses, which caused one of them to commit suicide. His father also physically abused him and other members of the family.

In 1997, Eaton assaulted a married couple and their five-month-old baby near Rock Springs, but the victims fiercely resisted during the attack and beat him up. At his subsequent trial, the prosecutors failed to prove his guilt with certainty, resulting in Eaton receiving a minor prison sentence. After receiving parole the following year, he was free for only a couple of months before being returned to prison for weapons offenses. He served his sentence at a federal prison in Colorado, where on September 3, 2001, he killed a fellow inmate named Carl Palmer. He was convicted of manslaughter in this case and given additional years to his initial sentence. During this time, a blood sample was taken from Eaton, and in July 2002, DNA testing determined that his genotypic profile matched the traces of seminal fluid found on the body of Lisa Kimmell.

On July 29, during an inspection of his property in Moneta, Kimmell's car was found buried in the ground at a depth of about 2 meters, which heavily strengthened suspicions against Eaton. He was charged with her rape and murder in February 2003. Authorities also determined that the car's wheels, seats, stereo and transmission equipment were missing, and when questioned, Eaton's son said that around mid-1988, he had helped his father install the stereo and seats in his pickup truck and helped remelt four wheels, which were later sold for scrap metal.

The trial began on March 9, 2004, and lasted only nine days. Eaton pleaded not guilty to some of the charges, but under pressure from the mounting evidence, he was forced to admit that he knew Kimmell. According to his version, she had attempted to rob his property and when he caught her in the act, he offered to have sex with her in exchange for not telling the police. After this, she supposedly left her car behind, which he dismantled and then buried. This version was rebuked by investigators, who claimed that Eaton had accidentally come across Kimmell's car on a deserted highway in Wyoming, then climbed into it during a traffic stop and forced her to drive to his property at gunpoint. He then held her captive and sexually assaulted her for several days before ultimately killing her and dumping her body in the river. On March 17, he was found guilty of kidnapping, raping, and killing Kimmell. Three days later, he was sentenced to death, but was later re-sentenced to life in prison without parole or commutation.

==== Suspicion in other crimes ====
After his conviction, he was investigated for potential involvement in other murders, but nothing linked him to them. Despite this, he remains a suspect in the Great Basin Murders primarily due to the fact that they ceased after his arrest. In addition, Eaton remains a suspect in other cases, including the disappearance of 24-year-old Amy Wroe Bechtel, who went missing from Lander, Wyoming, on July 24, 1997. She was not listed as a potential Great Basin victim due to the fact that she remains missing. Investigators established that Eaton was seen in Lander around the time Bechtel went missing, but he refused to cooperate with them on this matter and has not been ruled out as a suspect.

Eaton is also the prime suspect in an unrelated series of murders committed during the 1970s, again committed in the Great Basin area. On July 14, 1972, a rancher in rural Elko County, Nevada, found the naked and decomposed body of a woman who has never been identified. Before dumping the body, the perpetrator posed her body post-mortem and made it resemble the shape of a crucifix. The woman, nicknamed "Starr Valley Jane Doe", had been murdered months prior to discovery, having been shot twice in the head with a .22 caliber handgun. Like other victims of the Great Basin Killer, the Jane Doe was a white female, between the ages of 17 and 25 at the time of death, about 5'5" tall, weighed about 55 kilograms and had light red hair. Investigators suspect that her murder is related to the Elko County Jane Doe, whose corpse was discovered on November 16, 1993. Although the murders occurred 21 years apart, police assume that both cases were committed by the same individual, as he beat and shot his victims in an identical manner. In addition, both had been dumped near I-80 and both had been posed in shapes that resemble crosses. Authorities from Nevada State Police Department discussed a possible connection between the murders and Eaton in 2009, but the results of the discussion were never made public and no other charges were filed against him.

Eaton is also a suspect in the murders of two other unidentified women found in Elko County - the "Devil's Gate Jane Doe" and the "Thousand Springs Jane Doe". The first victim was found by a hunter in a shallow ditch on October 2, 1972. She was a white or Hispanic female, between the ages of 15 and 18, who had been killed about 12 weeks before her body was found. The second victim was found by hikers in a desert on July 16, 1974. She was in her mid-20s and her body was set on fire post-mortem, leaving only her skeletal remains behind.

=== Robert Ben Rhoades ===
In March 2005, another serial killer, 59-year-old Robert Ben Rhoades, a former truck driver from Houston, Texas, became a suspect. On April 1, 1990, he was arrested in Arizona on charges of assaulting a woman, in the course of which he sexually assaulted and tortured her. After his conviction, he was extradited to Illinois, where he was charged with the murder of 14-year-old Regina Walters, who was murdered in 1990 and had her body dumped by I-70. In 1994, Rhoades pleaded guilty and was sentenced to life imprisonment. In 2005, his DNA was linked to the murder of 24-year-old Patricia Walsh, one of the victims of the supposed Great Basin Killer.

In 2012, he pleaded guilty to killing both Walsh and Zyskowski, for which he received two additional life sentences. The cargo platform of his truck had a room with handcuffs on the ceiling, which were used by Rhoades to hang the victims. According to investigators, by early 1990, Rhoades was killing an average of three girls a month. He abducted his victims and then held them in the back of his truck for several days, where he sexually abused them before killing them. Under questioning, Rhoades said he picked up Walsh and Zyskowski in late 1989 in Texas, where they were married and trying to hitchhike to their hometown of Seattle. He stated that minutes after they got into his vehicle, he killed Zyskowski, dumped his body and for the next week he kept Walsh in the back of his truck, where he physically and sexually abused her before shooting and dumping her in Millard County, Utah. He also confessed to killing Regina Walters' boyfriend, Ricky Lee Jones. The pair had run away from their homes in Houston, and Jones went missing at the same time as her. Despite his confession, Rhoades was never charged in his supposed death.

=== Clark Perry Baldwin ===
In 2014, using DNA forensic analysis, investigators extracted DNA from traces of seminal fluid traces left by the man who had killed "Bitter Creek Betty". The genotypic profile of the killer matched biological traces of another woman who was not listed as a victim of the Great Basin Killer. The body of a young girl was discovered on April 13, 1992, in Sheridan County, Wyoming, about 400 miles from where "Bitter Creek Betty" was found. Her exact cause of death could not be determined, but it was homicidal in nature. She had been raped and suffered blunt force trauma to the head, and was likely killed in February 1992. She was determined to be about 10 weeks pregnant at the time of her death. "Sheridan County Jane Doe" was white, between the ages of 16 and 23, about 5'7" tall and 121 pounds. Due to her sunburned brown hair, some investigators believe that she might be from the southern United States. In 2025, she was publicly identified as Cindi Estrada of Torrance, California.

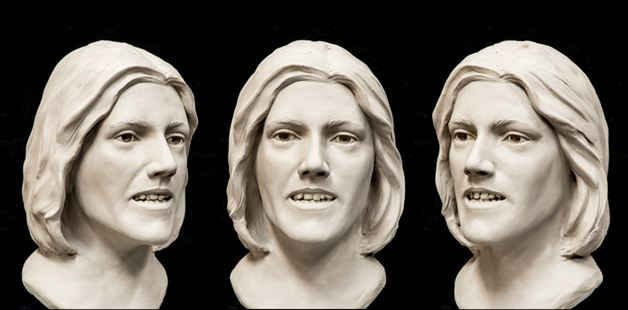
Reconstruction of Sheridan County Jane Doe

In 2020, the results of another DNA examination matched the genotypic profile of 59-year-old truck driver Clark Perry Baldwin, who was arrested on May 6 at his home in Waterloo, Iowa. In addition to the murders of the Jane Does, he was also charged in the murder of 32-year-old Pamela McCall and her unborn child, whose body was found on March 10, 1991, on the side of I-65 in Spring Hill, Tennessee, about 30 miles south of Nashville. She was sexually assaulted and died by strangulation. After the rape, Baldwin left traces of seminal fluid on the victim's pantyhose, from which the DNA was later isolated.

In February 1991, Baldwin was arrested on charges of raping a hitchhiker from Kansas in Wheeler County, Texas. At gunpoint, Baldwin struck her over the head and then bound her mouth, legs, raped her and attempted to strangle her, but the victim was able to free herself from her restraints and escape. During the preliminary investigation, Baldwin confessed to the assault, but the charge was dismissed due to failure to prosecute. After his arrest in 2020, his ex-wife told police that he had repeatedly mentioned strangling a girl in the 1990s in a western state and throwing her body out of his truck near an interstate highway.

In addition to this, Iowa State Police have announced that Baldwin is a suspect in the murder of Rhonda Knutson, whose body was found at a Phillips 66 truck stop near Williamstown. She was beaten to death at her workplace during the night shift. At that time, Baldwin was living in Nashua, which was a short drive from Williamstown. She had suffered severe blunt force trauma, but was not sexually assaulted. A co-worker of Knutson discovered her body in the back room of the store where they worked at. According to his claim, shortly before the murder, two truck drivers entered the store, one of whom was allegedly her killer. Based on the witness' testimony, police compiled two sketches of the two suspects, which were posted at approximately 1,500 truck stops in many states across the country in an effort to identify her killer(s). Baldwin matched the sketch very well, but he did not admit his involvement in the girl's murder after his arrest in 2020. On May 2, 2025, Baldwin was convicted of the first-degree murder of Pamela McCall and sentenced to life imprisonment. He died of a heart attack on July 18, 2025, before he could be extradited to Wyoming for the murders of Irene Vasquez and Cindi Estrada.

== Memorials ==
- Fabric artist Lily Martina Lee and photographer Carrie Quinney created a traveling exhibition, The Great Basin Murders, that memorializes the victims of the killings.

== See also ==
- List of serial killers in the United States
- List of solved missing person cases: 1950–1999
- List of unsolved murders (1980–1999)
