= KTUG =

- Hudson, Wyoming; United States
- Broadcast area: Lander and Riverton
- Frequency: 105.1 MHz
- Branding: 105.1 Jack FM

Programming
- Format: Adult hits
- Affiliations: Jack FM

Ownership
- Owner: Kairos Communications
- Sister stations: KDLY, KOVE

History
- First air date: July 10, 2009

Technical information
- Licensing authority: FCC
- Facility ID: 166002
- Class: C2
- ERP: 4,000 watts
- HAAT: 391 meters (1,283 ft)
- Transmitter coordinates: 42°34′42″N 108°42′46″W

Links
- Public license information: Public file; LMS
- Webcast: Listen live
- Website: county10.com/ktug

KTUG (105.1 FM, "Jack FM") is a radio station broadcasting an adult hits music format. Licensed to Hudson, Wyoming, United States, the station is currently owned by Kairos Communications and features programming from Fox News Radio and Jack FM. The station's transmitter is approximately 10 miles (16 km) southeast of Lander near the east edge of the Wind River Range, shared with KCWC-TV.

The station once carried a Contemporary Christian format, and was known as "105.1 The Ledge". It was owned by Higher Calling Communications.

KTUG was purchased in 2021 from Morcom Broadcasting by Kairos Communications. This brought the station two sister stations, KDLY and KOVE, which were also purchased by Kairos in 2021 from Fremont Broadcasting.

Kairos also owns County10, an online news source in Fremont County.
