= LND =

LND may refer to:

- London, Chapman code
- Lingfield College, Lingfield Notre Dame, a primary and secondary school in England
- Lega Nazionale Dilettanti, Italian football association that organizes amateur football leagues including Serie D
- Hunt Field, a small airport in Lander, Wyoming
- Lightning Network Daemon, an implementation of a Lightning Network node
- Longniddry railway station, East Lothian, Scotland, National Rail station code
