= Fremont County School District Number 1 =

School district in Wyoming, United States

Address
- 863 Sweetwater Street Lander, Wyoming, 82520; United States

District information
- Type: Public
- Grades: K–12
- NCES District ID: 5602870

Students and staff
- Students: 1,705 (2020–2021)
- Teachers: 135.55 (on an FTE basis)
- Staff: 192.61 (on an FTE basis)
- Student–teacher ratio: 12.58:1

Other information
- Website: www.landerschools.org

Fremont County School District #1 is a public school district based in Lander, Wyoming, United States.

== Geography ==
Fremont County School District #1 serves the southern portion of Fremont County, including the following communities:

- Incorporated places
  - Town of Hudson
  - City of Lander
- Census-designated places (Note: All census-designated places are unincorporated.)
  - Atlantic City
  - Jeffrey City
- Unincorporated places
  - South Pass City

== Schools ==
The district currently has six schools, five within the town of Lander and one at the community of Jeffrey City.

=== High schools ===
- Grades 9-12
  - Lander Valley High School
  - Pathfinder High School (Alternative - Currently under renovation. Students will attend old North School for 25-26 SY)

=== Middle school ===
- Grades 6-8
  - Lander Middle School

=== Elementary schools ===
- Grades K-6
  - Jeffrey City Elementary School
  - Gannett Peak Elementary School (South Elementary prior to summer 2011, also students from North Elementary School merged into Gannett Peak Elementary in 2012)
  - Baldwin Creek Elementary School (West Elementary prior to summer 2011)

== Student demographics ==
The following figures are as of October 1, 2009.

- Total District Enrollment: 1,672
- Student enrollment by gender
  - Male: 849 (50.78%)
  - Female: 823 (49.22%)
- Student enrollment by ethnicity
  - American Indian or Alaska Native: 235 (14.06%)
  - Asian: 17 (1.02%)
  - Black or African American: 6 (0.36%)
  - Hispanic or Latino: 113 (6.76%)
  - Native Hawaiian or Other Pacific Islander: 2 (0.12%)
  - Two or More Races: 98 (5.86%)
  - White: 1,201 (71.83%)

== See also ==
- List of school districts in Wyoming
