= LVHS =

LVHS may refer to:

- Les Varendes High School, St Andrew's, Guernsey
- Lago Vista High School, Lago Vista, Texas
- Lake View High School (Chicago), Illinois, United States
- Lea Valley High School, Enfield, London, England
- Lenape Valley Regional High School, Stanhope, New Jersey, United States
- Loudoun Valley High School, Purcellville, Virginia, United States
- Lander Valley High School, Lander, Wyoming, United States
