= Steve Bechtel =

American rock climber

Personal information
- Nationality: American
- Born: March 19, 1970 (age 56) Casper, Wyoming

Climbing career
- Type of climber: Free Solo
- First ascents: 1993 - Direct Northwest Face of Half Dome, Yosemite, CA VI 5.13d; 1995 - Cowboy Direct, Trango Tower, Pakistan - Expedition Leader, did not complete ascent - Expedition Leader, did not complete ascent. Detailed by Todd Skinner.; 1996 - Superfortess, The Merlon, Big Horn Mountains, Wyoming V 5.11d; 1998 - War and Poetry, Ulamertorsuaq, Greenland VI 5.12c; 2000 - True at First Light, Milima Poi, Kenya V 5.13a; 2009 - Last Go Round, Temple Peak, Wind Rivers, Wyoming

Steve Bechtel (born March 19, 1970) is a rock climber, coach, and author based in Lander, Wyoming. He has been important in developing climbing around the region since the 1990s. Bechtel is considered a prime suspect in the unsolved disappearance of his first wife, Amy Wroe Bechtel.

== Biography ==
Bechtel was born in Casper, Wyoming. As a teenager, Bechtel began to rock climb in central Wyoming, inspired by the sport climbing then popular in Europe. He later referred to these experiences as "great [opportunities] as a young person to see people at the cutting edge of the sport." His interest in Lander, Wyoming was piqued in the summer of 1990 when he heard about the limestone in the Black Hills, which was considered favorable for rock climbing. After two brief visits there that same year, Bechtel decided to move there the following year. Aside from a short period in the early 2000s when he lived in Salt Lake City, Utah, Bechtel has since resided permanently in Lander. He cited the Sinks Main Wall as the reason he settled permanently in the town.

As a rock climber, Bechtel has achieved first ascents all over the world. Bechtel is an SFG II, USA Weightlifting Certified Coach, a USA Cycling Elite-level coach, and has been coaching triathlon for nearly 15 years as a USAT-certified coach. He is a Certified Strength and Conditioning Specialist (CSCS) and holds a degree in Exercise Physiology from the University of Wyoming. In an interview in 2014, Bechtel stated that he considered himself a "retired" climber.

Bechtel lives in Lander where he owns Elemental Performance + Fitness Gym and runs the climbing training program known as Climb Strong. Bechtel was married to Amy Wroe Bechtel until her disappearance in 1997. In spring 2004, Bechtel began dating Ellen Sissman; they married five months later. They live together in Lander with their two children, Sam and Anabel.

== Disappearance of Amy Wroe Bechtel ==
On July 24, 1997, Bechtel's first wife, Amy Joy Bechtel (also known in the media as Amy Wroe Bechtel) disappeared during a run in the Wind River Mountains, approximately 15 miles southwest of Lander. An extensive search involving hundreds of volunteers turned up little information; the searchers soon suspected foul play. Initially, Steve Bechtel aided in the investigation, in the course of which he became a suspect. Investigators found undated personal writings by Bechtel, wherein he had expressed a desire to commit murder and eliminate evidence of the body. He was then approached by law enforcement with a request to take a polygraph test, but he refused upon the advice of his lawyer. Thereafter, Bechtel terminated further cooperation with law enforcement. Bechtel has offered several explanations for not taking the polygraph test. In 1997, Bechtel said that he was willing to take it, but that his lawyer threatened to drop him as a client if he did. His lawyer, while defending his client's right to refuse the test, denied that he would drop Bechtel if he defied his advice. Nineteen years later, Bechtel dismissed polygraph tests as "monkey traps": "Anybody who needs me to take that test—I don’t need them in my life." In 2010, when the investigation was headed up by Detective John Zerga, a tip shifted the investigation to imprisoned murderer Dale Wayne Eaton. According to a later interview, however, Zerga said that Bechtel remains a suspect in the disappearance of his first wife. The case remains open.

== Books ==
- Logical Progression: Using Nonlinear Periodization for Year-Round Climbing Performance (2017)
- Strength: Foundational Training for Rock Climbing (2014)
- Power Endurance: Fatigue Management for Rock Climbing (2012)
- Lander Rock Climbs (2015)
- Cirque of the Towers (2008)
