= Tahnee Robinson =

American basketball player (born 1988)

Personal information
- Born: February 2, 1988 (age 38) Fort Washakie, Wyoming, U.S.

Career information
- High school: Lander Valley (Lander, Wyoming)
- College: Nevada (2009–2011)
- WNBA draft: 2011: 3rd round, 31st overall pick
- Drafted by: Phoenix Mercury
- Position: Guard

Career highlights
- 2x First-team All-WAC (2010, 2011); WAC Freshman of the Year (2010)
- Stats at WNBA.com
- Stats at Basketball Reference

Tahnee Robinson (born February 2, 1988) is an American former professional basketball player now actively coaching in the NCAA Division I. She is the first enrolled Native American woman to be drafted into the WNBA being a member of the Northern Cheyenne tribe. She was also the first player to be drafted into the WNBA from the University of Nevada-Reno (UNR).

== Early life ==
Tahnee Robinson was born February 2, 1988, in Fort Washakie, Wyoming, to Tim and Sara Robinson. Her mother is Pawnee and Shoshone and her father is Cheyenne and Sioux. She was raised on the Wind River Reservation in Fort Washakie, Wyoming with her two brothers. She is an enrolled member of the Northern Cheyenne tribe. Robinson began playing basketball at the age of four, and at the age of six told her mother that she would like to play basketball in college. In high school Tahnee became one of McDonald's High School All-Americans. Tahnee had a successful high school career; during her senior year Robinson led her team to win the Class 3A State title in 2006, and signed her letter of intent to play at the University of Wyoming.

== College career ==
After she graduated from Lander Valley High School in 2006 she went to the University of Wyoming. However, during her freshman year she became unexpectedly pregnant, and gave birth to a son at the age of 19 forcing her to leave school. She was then granted a chance to play for Sheridan College, and took the opportunity. She tried balancing being a full-time student, a single mom, and an athlete at the same time but she was overwhelmed and forced to leave her son with her parents. Tahnee became the leading scorer in the nation for National Junior College Athletic Association schools, averaging nearly 30 points per game (PPG). Leading her team to their first-ever appearance at Nationals in 2009, Robinson's performance gained a lot of attention from four-year universities. She then graduated from Sheridan College with an Associate of Science Degree in General Studies before she transferred to the University of Nevada for the 2010–11 season.

In her first year at the University of Nevada she had a breakout season as the Wolf Pack's co-captain in 2009-10 she was named the Western Athletic Conference's Newcomer of the Year and first-team All-WAC. The entire 2010–11 season she remained in the top-15 in the nation for scoring, ending the year as the ninth-best with 22.1 points per game. She then picked up her second All-WAC first-team nod and was named to the WAC All-Tournament Team. Her senior year Tahnee was promoted to captain, and went on to become one of twelve of Nevada's 1,000-point scorers averaging 19.5 points per game. In addition, she was named one of five finalists for the Sullivan Award, given annually to the nation's top amateur athlete. Furthermore, Robinson was also named a WBCA All-Region honoree and WAC Verizon Wireless Player of the Week three times over the season. Robinson lead The Wolf Pack to a record 22 wins in her two-year career. Tahnee then received her Bachelor of Science Degree in General Studies with emphasis in Health Education, Communication and Native American Studies at Nevada-Reno.

=== College statistics ===
Legend
GP	Games played	GS	Games started	MPG	Minutes per game	RPG	Rebounds per game
APG	Assists per game	SPG	Steals per game	BPG	Blocks per game	PPG	Points per game
TO	Turnovers per game	FG%	Field-goal percentage	3P%	3-point field-goal percentage	FT%	Free-throw percentage
**Bold**	Career best	°	League leader

Year	Team	GP	Points	FG%	3P%	FT%	RPG	APG	SPG	BPG	PPG
2009–10	Nevada	24	NA	**44.92**	40.95	79.091	4.125	**2.0**	**0.67**	**0.3**	16.1
2010–11	Nevada	**31**	**685**	44.46	**41.5**	**80.8**	**6.1**	1.4	'0.58	0.2	**22.1**
Career	Nevada	55	685	44.6	41.3	80.1	5.3	1.7	0.62	0.26	12.5

== Professional career ==
In 2011 she became Nevada's first WNBA selection, and the first enrolled full blooded Native American woman drafted in the third round by the Phoenix Mercury. Tahnee was then traded to the Connecticut Sun where she played for them overseas before she was released from the roster. After being released from the team the Head coach Mike Thibault stated that he believed that Robinson can eventually become a good player in the league. He also stated, "Tahnee just hadn't been able to beat out the people in front of her," Thibault said. "The players at our guard position are pretty solid veterans and there really isn't a roster spot for her at this point. She has some work to do in a couple of areas of her game and hopefully she can go overseas also and work on them." Robinson then decided to play four seasons of professional basketball overseas. Over the four years she played professional basketball in countries such as Israel, Bulgaria, Ukraine, Poland and China, but unfortunately suffered from an injury.

Tahnee then returned to the University of Nevada-Reno and became a graduate assistant for the Wolf Pack Women's basketball team while she pursued her master's degree in the University of Nevada's educational leadership program. Robinson was then promoted to the Director of Player Development for the Wolf Pack. Making her one of three Native women coaching at the NCAA Division I level. Robinson is also a Nike N7 basketball ambassador and the national spokeswoman for “Let’s Move! In Indian Country,” a Michelle Obama, health initiative. Tahnee is also the national spokeswoman for Big Brothers & Big Sisters.

== See also ==
- Ryneldi Becenti
- Angel Goodrich
- Shoni Schimmel
