= Lander Downtown Historic District =

Historic district in Wyoming, United States

- U.S. National Register of Historic Places
- U.S. Historic district
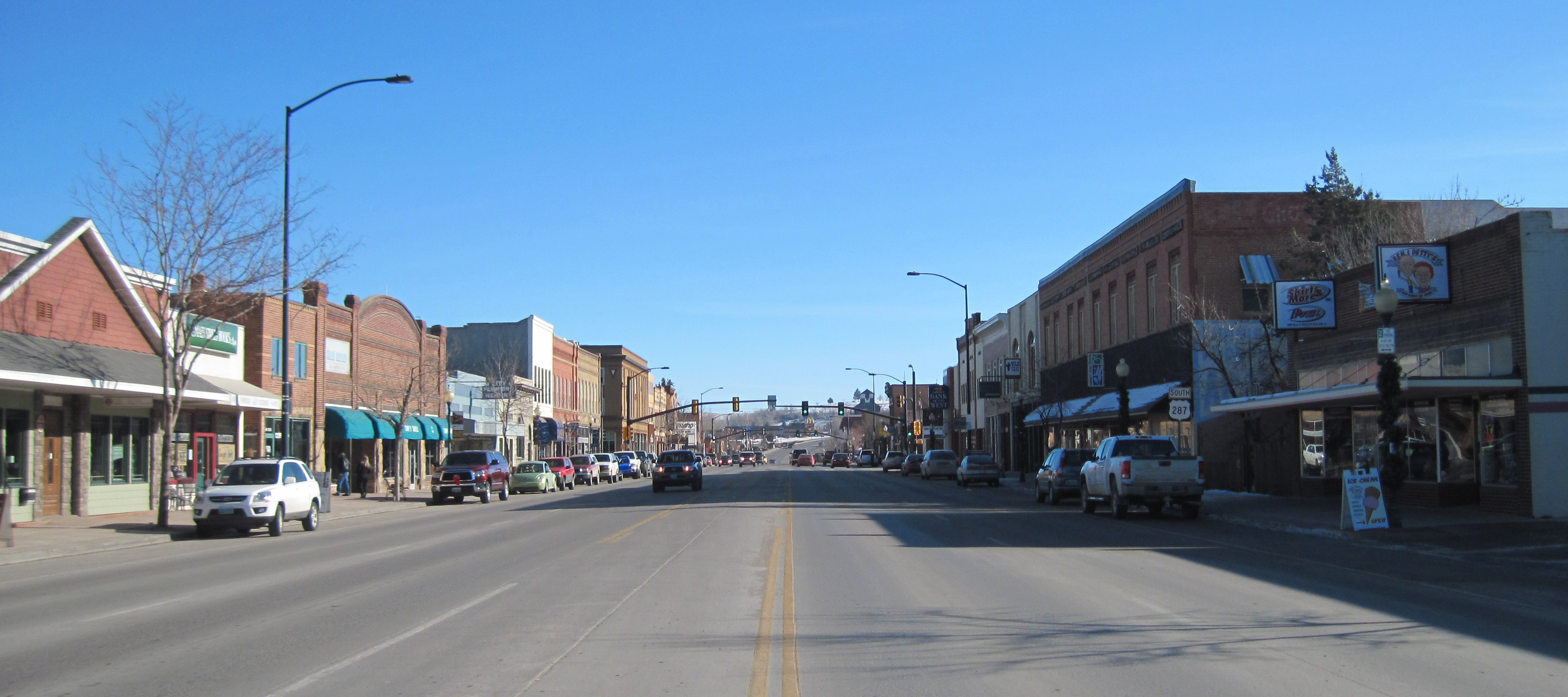
- Downtown Lander in 2012

- Location within Wyoming Location within the United States
- Location: Main St. between Second and Fourth Sts., Lander, Wyoming
- Coordinates: 42°49′59″N 108°43′55″W
- Area: 5.2 acres (2.1 ha)
- Architect: US Department of the Treasury; Taylor, Henry Knox
- Architectural style: Late 19th And 20th Century Revivals, Mission/spanish Revival, Second Renaissance Revival
- NRHP reference No.: 87000700
- Added to NRHP: May 5, 1987

The Lander Downtown Historic District comprises the commercial core of Lander, Wyoming. The district includes 16 buildings listed as contributing to the historic district, including a series of commercial buildings, the Noble Hotel, the grand Theatre and the Stockgrower's Bar. The Federal Building is included, and is individually listed on the National Register of Historic Places as well. Most date between 1890 and 1910. Most earlier buildings burned or were torn down and replaced by more permanent masonry structures. By 1910 an oil boom had begun in central Wyoming, providing an incentive to build substantial buildings. The district comprises most of the north side of Main Street between Second Street and Fourth Street, with three properties on the south side and one facing Lincoln Street at Third Street.

The district was placed on the National Register of Historic Places on May 5, 1987.
