= Wyoming Wildlife Federation =

- Abbreviation: WWF
- Formation: 1937; 89 years ago
- Type: Nonprofit
- Tax ID no.: 23-7002578
- Legal status: 501(c)(3)
- Headquarters: Lander, Wyoming
- Members: >8,000 (2019)
- Board Chair: Chris Simonds
- Executive Director: Joy Bannon
- Board of directors: Chris Simonds; Mark Cole; Temple Stoellinger; Levi Jensen; Lew Carpenter; David Willms; Diane Martinez; Tom Radosevich
- Website: https://wyomingwildlife.org/

The Wyoming Wildlife Federation (WWF), established in 1937 and as of January 2019 has over 8,000 members, is Wyoming's oldest and largest statewide sportsmen/conservation organization.

The WWF mission statement declares that "The Wyoming Wildlife Federation works for hunters, anglers, and other wildlife enthusiasts to protect and enhance habitat, to perpetuate quality hunting and fishing, to protect citizens' right to use public lands and waters, and to promote ethical hunting and fishing."

They have worked with Wyoming Council of Trout Unlimited and the Theodore Roosevelt Conservation Partnership. WWF is governed by a board of directors, including 12 associate directors who represent the membership at large, and a number of affiliate directors who represent WWF affiliate organizations. Affiliate directors sit as ex officio members. WWF is located in Lander, WY.

WWF organizes the traditional sportsmen community regarding conservation issues. Recent WWF campaigns have included Sportsmen for the Wyoming Range, the Greater Little Mountain Coalition, and the development of both renewable (e.g., wind) and non-renewable energy (e.g., natural gas and oil shale) in wildlife habitats in Wyoming. WWF has also been active in campaigns to maintain hunting and fishing access. WWF has lobbied the Wyoming State Legislature on issues that affect wildlife in Wyoming. WWF members are also involved in on-the-ground projects to improve wildlife habitat in Wyoming.

WWF is an affiliate of National Wildlife Federation (NWF).
