= Lil' Miss murder =

American murder case

Lisa Marie Kimmell
- Born: July 18, 1969; Covington, Tennessee, U.S.
- Disappeared: March 25, 1988; Denver, Colorado, U.S.
- Died: c. April 2, 1988 (aged 18); Casper, Wyoming, U.S.
- Cause of death: Homicide
- Body discovered: April 2, 1988

The Lil' Miss murder is the name given to the murder case of Lisa Marie Kimmell (July 18, 1969 – April 2, 1988), a young American woman who disappeared while traveling from Denver, Colorado, to her family's home in Billings, Montana. Her case was given its name due to her vehicle, a Honda CR-X, which had the distinctive personalized license plate reading "LIL MISS", a fact widely publicized in efforts to recover her.

Kimmell remained a missing person for eight days before her body was discovered floating in the North Platte River near Casper, Wyoming. Evidence from a nearby bridge revealed she had been bludgeoned and stabbed to death there, before being thrown into the water. Kimmell's murder remained a cold case for 14 years, until DNA profiling linked Dale Wayne Eaton to her kidnapping, rape, and murder. In 2002, Kimmell's missing car was recovered from Eaton's property, where he had buried it after her abduction and murder. Eaton was convicted of first degree murder and sentenced to death in 2004. His death sentence has since been commuted to life imprisonment.

At the time of her disappearance, Kimmell's case was profiled nationally on the series Unsolved Mysteries, and her murder has been subject to various true-crime documentary segments. A book called Rivers of Blood was published in 2009 that details her disappearance and murder.

== Background ==
Lisa Marie Kimmell was born July 18, 1969, in Covington, Tennessee, the eldest of three daughters born to Sheila and Ronald Kimmell. She was raised in Billings, Montana. Upon graduating from Billings Senior High School in 1987, Kimmell took a job managing an Arby's restaurant in Aurora, Colorado, near Denver. Kimmell's mother, Sheila, was a regional manager of the restaurant chain, and the two commuted between Billings and Denver—a distance of approximately 555 miles (893 km)—weekly. During the week, Lisa and her mother resided in an apartment complex in Denver, each in her own separate apartment, and would regularly return to Billings, where Ronald and the other Kimmell children resided.

Dale Eaton was born in 1945 and reportedly had a difficult upbringing.

== Disappearance ==
On March 25, 1988, Kimmell left from Denver, heading north to her parents' home in Billings. Her mother, Sheila, had departed from Denver on a flight to Billings the day before, as she was scheduled to go on a skiing trip.

En route to Billings, Kimmell planned to stop in Cody, Wyoming along the way to pick up her boyfriend, Ed. Wyoming Highway Patrol records showed that she was stopped for speeding in Douglas, Wyoming just outside Casper, Wyoming at 9:06 p.m. While attempting to pay her ticket, Kimmell was followed to an ATM by the officer, but found the machine incompatible with her debit card. The officer agreed to allow Kimmel to mail a check to the police department to pay the fine once she returned to Billings. This was the last confirmed sighting of Kimmell, though there was one unconfirmed sighting of her inside a Casper, Wyoming grocery store at approximately 10:00 p.m. that night.

Kimmell was reported missing by family members the following day, March 26, when her boyfriend, Ed, called their home in Billings notifying them that Lisa had never arrived to pick him up at his home in Cody.

== Discovery of body ==
Eight days after her disappearance, on April 2, Kimmell's body was found floating in the North Platte River near Casper, Wyoming, by a local fisherman. An autopsy determined that she had been bound, beaten and raped, for at least six days. Evidence showed that she was then taken to the Old Government Bridge (42°38′18″N 106°37′03″W), where she was hit on the head with a blunt object, stabbed six times in the chest and abdomen, before being thrown into the river. The autopsy showed that the head wound would have killed her in a matter of minutes even if she had not been stabbed.

Kimmell's case was profiled on the television program Unsolved Mysteries within weeks, and A&E's Cold Case Files in the years since, with each case concentrating on locating witnesses who might have seen her black 1988 Honda CR-X automobile with a Montana plate bearing a personalized "LIL MISS" license plate. Investigators knew recovering the car was extremely important as it would be a direct link to the killer.

== Breakthrough ==
Dale Eaton

In the summer of 2002, investigators researching cold cases came across Kimmell's rape kit, and a DNA profile was developed from the seminal evidence. The CODIS database matched the DNA to Dale Wayne Eaton, 57, of Moneta, Wyoming, who was then serving time at Englewood federal prison in Littleton, Colorado on an unrelated weapons charge. Eaton's DNA profile was placed in the CODIS database in 1997 after he was arrested on a separate charge: he had stopped to offer assistance to the Breeden family, whose car had broken down, but then he kidnapped the family at gunpoint. After his arrest for this kidnapping, Eaton escaped, but was later recaptured in Shoshone National Forest. At that time he possessed a weapon, elevating his crime to the federal level. He was then incarcerated in federal prison, where he was obligated to submit a DNA sample.

Eaton's next door neighbors reported to investigators that they had seen him digging a large hole on his property in Moneta, Wyoming, approximately 75 miles (121 km) from Casper. The site was excavated in the summer of 2002, and Kimmell's Honda CRX was unearthed, still bearing her distinctive "LIL MISS" license plate. Eaton was subsequently charged with eight crimes connected to the Kimmell case, including first-degree premeditated murder, aggravated kidnapping, aggravated robbery, first-degree sexual assault, and second-degree sexual assault.

A fellow inmate, Joseph Francis Dax, testified Eaton confessed to him as follows: Kimmell offered to give Eaton a ride, and Eaton accepted. He made sexual advances during the ride which Kimmel did not appreciate, so she pulled over to let him out of the car. The situation then escalated to kidnapping, rape, and murder.

Eaton was found guilty of all charges and sentenced to death on March 20, 2004. He appealed this conviction and lost. Scheduled to be put to death in February 2010, he sought and received a stay of execution in December 2009. It was overturned in 2014. The state originally planned to seek a reinstatement of Eaton's death sentence, before dropping their request in September 2021. Prior to his removal from death row, Eaton was the only inmate on Wyoming's death row.

== Civil lawsuit ==
Eaton's property was awarded to the Kimmell family after a wrongful death lawsuit, and the buildings were burned to the ground on July 18, 2005, on what would have been Lisa Kimmell's 36th birthday.

== Potentially related cases ==
Law enforcement has suspected that Kimmell's murder may have been part of a pattern of serial killings, known as the Great Basin Murders, which took place between 1983 and 1996 in Wyoming. Most of the victims were young women who initially disappeared, only to be later found murdered. Because Kimmell's body was located in a popular fishing spot (creating a public spectacle) and her car was buried on his property (kept as a trophy) it is believed that Eaton exhibited some of the tell-tale signs of being a serial killer.

Amy Wroe Bechtel, a woman who disappeared in 1997 from Lander, Wyoming, is considered by law enforcement to be among the Great Basin killer's potential victims. Bechtel disappeared while going for a run outside Lander. When her husband returned home at 4:30 p.m., she was not home. Bechtel's white Toyota station wagon was found parked off a dirt road in the Shoshone Forest. No trace of Bechtel has been found but subsequent investigation placed Eaton on business in the area around the time of the disappearance.

== Media ==
Both Kimmell's and Bechtel's cases were profiled on Unsolved Mysteries and Nightmare Next Door. Kimmell's mother, Sheila, published a book, The Murder of Lil' Miss, about her daughter's life and murder, in 2005. True crime author Robert Scott wrote a book called Rivers of Blood (2009) that detail Eaton's life and crimes, including the disappearance and murder of Lisa Kimmell. The case was also profiled in an episode of On The Case with Paula Zahn.

== See also ==
- List of serial killers in the United States
- List of solved missing person cases: 1950–1999

== Sources ==
- Kimmell, Sheila (2005). The Murder of Lil' Miss. Pathway Books. ISBN 978-0-976-74700-0.
- Scott, Robert (2009). Rivers of Blood. New York: Pinnacle. ISBN 978-0-786-01996-0.
