= KDLY =

- Lander, Wyoming; United States
- Broadcast area: Riverton area
- Frequency: 97.5 MHz
- Branding: 97.5 The Brand

Programming
- Format: Country
- Affiliations: Fox News Radio, Jones Radio Network

Ownership
- Owner: Will Hill; (Kairos Broadcasting, LLC)
- Sister stations: KOVE (AM), KTUG

History
- First air date: 1975

Technical information
- Licensing authority: FCC
- Facility ID: 22623
- Class: C1
- ERP: 62,000 watts
- HAAT: -111 meters
- Transmitter coordinates: 42°49′14.9″N 108°45′55.7″W
- Repeater: K244EU 96.7 FM (Thermopolis)

Links
- Public license information: Public file; LMS
- Webcast: Listen Live
- Website: 97.5 The Brand Online

KDLY (97.5 FM, "97.5 The Brand") is a radio station broadcasting a country music format. Licensed to Lander, Wyoming, United States, the station serves the Riverton area and the Wind River Reservation as well as most of Central Wyoming. The station is currently owned by Will Hill, through licensee Kairos Broadcasting, LLC.

== History ==
The station signed on the air in 1975 with 25,000 watts from a tower near US 287 northwest of Lander. The station's antenna was at 425 feet above average terrain. It was owned by Fremont Broadcasting. In 1978, the transmitter was moved again, this time 2.5 miles northeast of Lander's city limits, and the power was increased to 61,600 watts. The station's current transmitter is located just southwest of Lander off of Squaw Creek Road.

The station has two sister stations, KOVE and KTUG.

The station was sold in 2021 by Fremont Broadcasting to Kairos Broadcasting.

On October 3, 2022, KDLY changed their format from classic hits to country, branded as "97.5 The Brand". With the flip, sister station KOVE-AM changed to news/talk.

KDLY is an affiliate of state-wide news source Cowboy State Daily Radio News. The news broadcast can be heard mornings, afternoons, and evenings on the station. The station is also heard via translator K244EU 96.7 FM in Thermopolis.
