= KOVE (AM) =

- Lander, Wyoming; United States
- Broadcast area: Riverton area
- Frequency: 1330 kHz
- Branding: AM 1330 - 107.7 FM KOVE

Programming
- Format: Talk radio
- Affiliations: Fox News Radio

Ownership
- Owner: Will Hill; (Kairos Broadcasting, LLC)
- Sister stations: KDLY, KTUG

History
- First air date: November 6, 1948

Technical information
- Licensing authority: FCC
- Facility ID: 22624
- Class: B
- Power: 5,000 watts (day); 250 watts (night)
- Transmitter coordinates: 42°50′33.8″N 108°44′43.4″W
- Translator: 107.7 K299BC (Lander)

Links
- Public license information: Public file; LMS
- Webcast: Listen Live
- Website: KOVE Online

KOVE (1330 AM) is a radio station broadcasting a talk format. Licensed to Lander, Wyoming, United States, the station serves the Riverton area. The station is currently owned by Will Hill, through licensee Kairos Broadcasting, LLC.

== History ==
The station was initially licensed on 1230 kHz in 1948, receiving it's license to cover on February 23, 1949. The station started with 250 watts, the then-limit for so-called graveyarder frequencies, referred to as local frequencies by the FCC. In November 1953, the station applied to move to 1330 kHz and increase power to 1,000 watts day and night. The station was owned by Fremont Broadcasting. The station received a power increase to 5,000 watts in 1962.

For much of its life, the station carried a country music format.

In 2021, the station was sold from Fremont Broadcasting to Kairos Broadcasting, along with sister station KDLY.

In September 2022, KOVE changed its format from country to news/talk.
