= Disappearance of Amy Wroe Bechtel =

Amy Wroe Bechtel
- Portrait of Bechtel
- Born: Amy Joy Wroe; August 4, 1972; Santa Barbara, California, U.S.
- Disappeared: July 24, 1997 (aged 24); Lander, Wyoming, U.S.
- Status: Missing for 29 years, 3 months and 18 days
- Education: University of Wyoming
- Known for: Missing person
- Height: 5 ft 6 in (168 cm)
- Spouse: Steve Bechtel (m. 1996)
- Parent(s): Duane and JoAnne Wroe

Amy Joy Wroe Bechtel (August 4, 1972 – disappeared July 24, 1997; declared legally dead 2004) was an American woman who disappeared while jogging in the Wind River Range approximately 15 miles southwest of Lander, Wyoming. Bechtel was a record-breaking distance runner at the University of Wyoming and aspired to qualify for the 2000 Summer Olympics. Her disappearance garnered extensive media coverage and investigative work, but her case remains unsolved. In 2004, Bechtel was declared legally deceased by her husband, rock climber Steve Bechtel.

== Background ==
Bechtel was born Amy Joy Wroe in 1972 in California. She was born to Duane and Jo Anne Wroe, and was the youngest of four children. Shortly after her birth, her family relocated to Jackson, Wyoming. She was primarily raised in Jackson and Douglas, Wyoming. In 1992, while attending the University of Wyoming, Bechtel met her future husband, Steve. After graduating, the two moved to Lander, Wyoming, and married in June 1996.

== Disappearance ==
On July 24, 1997, Bechtel taught a fitness class, ran errands, and visited a local photography business to inquire about a photography competition. At the time, she was also organizing a 10-kilometer race in Shoshone National Forest, scheduled for September 7, 1997. After her in-town activities, Bechtel is believed to have traveled through Sinks Canyon State Park to the Loop Road, a roadway that traverses the Wind River Range to South Pass. Bechtel purportedly went to the Loop Road to practice the route of the 10-kilometer race she was organizing.

The day Bechtel disappeared, her husband, Steve, traveled with a friend to Dubois, Wyoming, to scout rock climbing routes. Steve returned to Lander at 4:30 p.m.; Bechtel was not at home when Steve returned. At 10 p.m., Steve called Bechtel's parents and asked if they knew where Bechtel was. Shortly thereafter, Steve contacted the Fremont County sheriff's department while friends began searching Lander for Bechtel's vehicle. At about 1 a.m. on July 25, 1997, searchers located Bechtel's vehicle, a white Toyota Tercel, at Burnt Gulch, an area along the Loop Road. Her vehicle was unlocked but provided no indication of Bechtel's whereabouts.

== Investigation ==
By 3 a.m. July 25, an extensive search for Bechtel was underway from law enforcement, as well as Steve and the couple's friends and family. By July 27, police were receiving roughly 1,000 calls per day with tips and potential leads in Bechtel's disappearance; additionally, various lakes and mines were searched with no results.

Investigators initially believed Bechtel fell victim to the elements or was perhaps attacked by a bear or mountain lion; however, they later suspected Steve after uncovering a series of his journals describing violence toward women and, specifically, his wife. Detectives interrogated Steve on August 1, 1997, falsely claiming to have evidence proving he murdered his wife; in response, Steve terminated the interview. He later said the journals comprised song lyrics he wrote for his band, and that they were unrelated to Bechtel or her disappearance.

In 1998, local police stated that Steve Bechtel was not a central suspect in the case but that they had wanted to clear him of suspicion to follow other leads, which they could not do after his lack of cooperation. Steve provided an alibi for the time of Bechtel's disappearance, which was corroborated by friends who agreed they spent the afternoon rock climbing with him. However, on the advice of criminal defense attorney Kent Spence, Steve refused to submit to a polygraph test. Additionally, a woman driving through the area from where Bechtel disappeared claimed to have seen a truck matching Steve's.

In late August 1997, the FBI requested satellite photos from NASA of the area on the day of Bechtel's disappearance, but the satellite images provided no information. In January 1998, the FBI obtained satellite images taken by the Russian space station Mir, but they also revealed nothing of note.

=== Later developments ===
In June 2003, a doctor hiking near the Popo Agie River found and turned into police a Timex Iron Man digital watch. It was noted to be similar to a watch Bechtel had owned at the time of her disappearance; however, law enforcement could not determine whether the watch belonged to her.

In a 2007 interview with the Billings Gazette, Sheriff Sgt. Roger Rizor stated: "I believe it was a homicide, and I believe what happened to her happened on the day she disappeared. In my mind, there is only one person I want to talk to, only one who has refused to talk to law enforcement, and that's her husband."

Dale Wayne Eaton, a convicted murderer on Wyoming's death row, has also been cited as a suspect in the case. According to Eaton's brother, he was near the area where Bechtel disappeared at the time of her disappearance. However, Eaton has refused to discuss the case.

== Media depictions ==
Bechtel's case received significant media attention. On February 3, 1998, Steve appeared on The Geraldo Rivera Show with Bechtel's sisters, who pleaded with him to provide information regarding her disappearance. Steve denied any involvement in his wife's disappearance during the program.

The case was profiled in both People magazine and Outside in 1998, as well as the television series Unsolved Mysteries. It was later profiled on the series Disappeared in 2013, and was also the subject of an extensive article featured in Runner's World in 2016. Bechtel's disappearance is discussed by Jon Billman in his 2020 book The Cold Vanish.

== See also ==
- List of people who disappeared mysteriously (2000–present)
