= Lander Valley High School =

Coordinates: 42.8415°N 108.7512°W

- 350 Baldwin Creek Road, Lander, Wyoming; United States

Information
- Type: Public
- School district: Fremont County District #1
- Principal: Brad Neuendorf
- Staff: 38.27 (FTE)
- Faculty: 36
- Grades: 9–12
- Enrollment: 558 (2023–2024)
- Student to teacher ratio: 14.58
- Colors: Green and black
- Teams: Tigers
- Website: www.landerschools.org/o/lvhs

Lander Valley High School (LVHS) is the primary high school located in Lander, Wyoming at 305 Baldwin Creek Rd, Lander, Wyoming 82520. The school is part of the Fremont County District #1. The school district serves Lander and outlying communities including Hudson, Jeffrey City, Atlantic City, and the surrounding area, which also includes Wind River Indian Reservation. The school is accredited by the Wyoming Department of Education and AdvancED (North Central).

== History ==
LVHS was originally known as Fremont County Vocational High School (FCVHS). In 1969, FCVHS changed the name to Lander Valley High School (LVHS). The school building was originally located near the west end of Main Street, with a nearby field house on Baldwin Creek. In 2004, the old high school was demolished, and the school district built the new LVHS next to the previously stated field house.

== Demographics ==
Lander Valley High School has 527 students in grades 9–12. The school district has approximately 1,800 students.

District Demographics
White	Native American	Hispanic	Multiracial	Asian
73%	12%	7%	6%	1%

U.S. News & World Report School Score Card
	Local	State	National
College Readiness Index	3.2		N/A
AP Tested	10%		N/A
AP Passed	9%		N/A
Mathematics Proficiency	41%	40%	25%
English Proficiency	34%	30%	37%

=== Additional statistics ===
LVHS has a 13:1 student-to-teacher ratio.

Total minority enrollment: 31%.

Total economically disadvantaged: 31%.

Full-time teachers: 36.

Percentage of students who are female: 47%.

LVHS has an 82% graduation rate.

== Mascot ==
The mascot for LVHS is the Tiger, which can be seen at pep rallies and most sporting events. The mascot's name is Tony the Tiger.

== Sports programs ==
The sports programs at LVHS include:

- Football
- Basketball – Boys and Girls
- Volleyball – Girls
- Wrestling – Boys and Girls
- Swimming – Boys and Girls
- Golf – Boys and Girls
- Cross country skiing – Boys and Girls
- Track – Boys and Girls
- Cross country running – Boys and Girls

Softball - Girls

== Additional extracurricular programs ==
LVHS has a band, choir, theater program, 4-H club, and FFA.

LVHS also has a wide variety of club programs as well.

== Notable alumni ==
- Holly Allen — Miss Wyoming USA 2012 winner and contestant on Big Brother 21 (American season)
- Tahnee Robinson WNBA Player
- Aaron Elling Minnesota Vikings kicker
