= Hunt Field =

Airport in Wyoming, US

- IATA: LND; ICAO: KLND; FAA LID: LND

Summary
- Airport type: Public
- Owner: City of Lander
- Serves: Lander, Wyoming
- Elevation AMSL: 5,587 ft (1,703 m)
- Coordinates: 42°48′56″N 108°43′42″W

Map
- Location of airport in Wyoming LND (the United States)

Runways
Direction	Length		Surface
Direction	ft	m	Surface
3/21	5,007	1,526	Asphalt

Helipads
Number	Length		Surface
Number	ft	m	Surface
H1	40	12	Asphalt

Statistics (2012)
- Aircraft operations: 11,130
- Based aircraft: 40
- Source: Federal Aviation Administration

Hunt Field (IATA: LND, ICAO: KLND, FAA LID: LND) is a city-owned, public-use airport located one nautical mile (2 km) south of the central business district of Lander, a city in Fremont County, Wyoming, United States. It is included in the National Plan of Integrated Airport Systems for 2011–2015, which categorized it as a general aviation facility.

== Facilities and aircraft ==
Hunt Field covers an area of 135 acres (55 ha) at an elevation of 5,587 feet (1,703 m) above mean sea level. It has one runway designated 4/22 with an asphalt surface measuring 5,007 by 100 feet (1,526 x 30 m). It also has one helipad designated H1 with an asphalt surface measuring 40 by 40 feet (12 x 12 m).

For the 12-month period ending May 31, 2018, the airport had 11,130 aircraft operations, an average of 30 per day: 99% general aviation, 1% air taxi, and <1% military. At that time there were 47 aircraft based at this airport: 85% single-engine, 10% multi-engine, 2% jet, and 2% helicopter, plus 1 ultralight.

== See also ==
- List of airports in Wyoming
