= United States Post Office and Courthouse (Lander, Wyoming) =

- US Post Office and Courthouse--Lander Main
- U.S. National Register of Historic Places
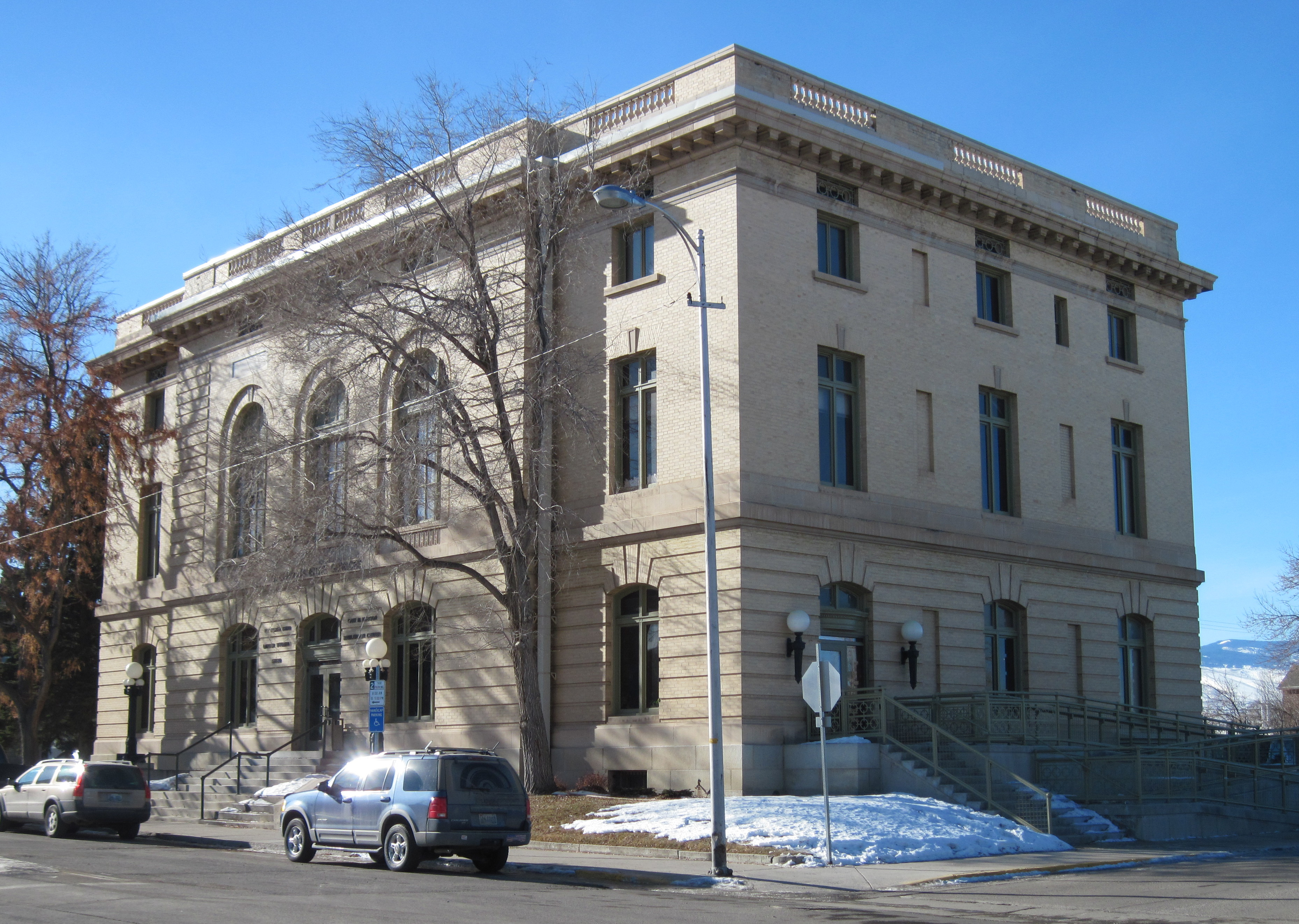
- US Post Office and Courthouse

- Location within Wyoming Location within the United States
- Location: 177 North Third Street, Lander, Wyoming
- Coordinates: 42.8340°N 108.7311°W
- Built: 1907
- Built by: Tom Lovell
- Architect: James Knox Taylor
- Architectural style: Late 19th and 20th Century Revivals
- MPS: Historic US Post Offices in Wyoming, 1900–1941, TR
- NRHP reference No.: 87000782
- Added to NRHP: May 19, 1987

The U.S. Post Office and Courthouse in Lander, Wyoming was built in 1907 as part of a facilities improvement program by the United States Post Office Department. The post office in Lander was nominated to the National Register of Historic Places as part of a thematic study comprising twelve Wyoming post offices built to standardized USPO plans in the early twentieth century. Lander's post office is unique among the group because it incorporates court facilities.

The building is now used as offices for a rehabilitation and disabilities advocacy group.
