= Moneta, Wyoming =

Unincorporated community in Freemont County, Wyoming, United States

- Unincorporated community
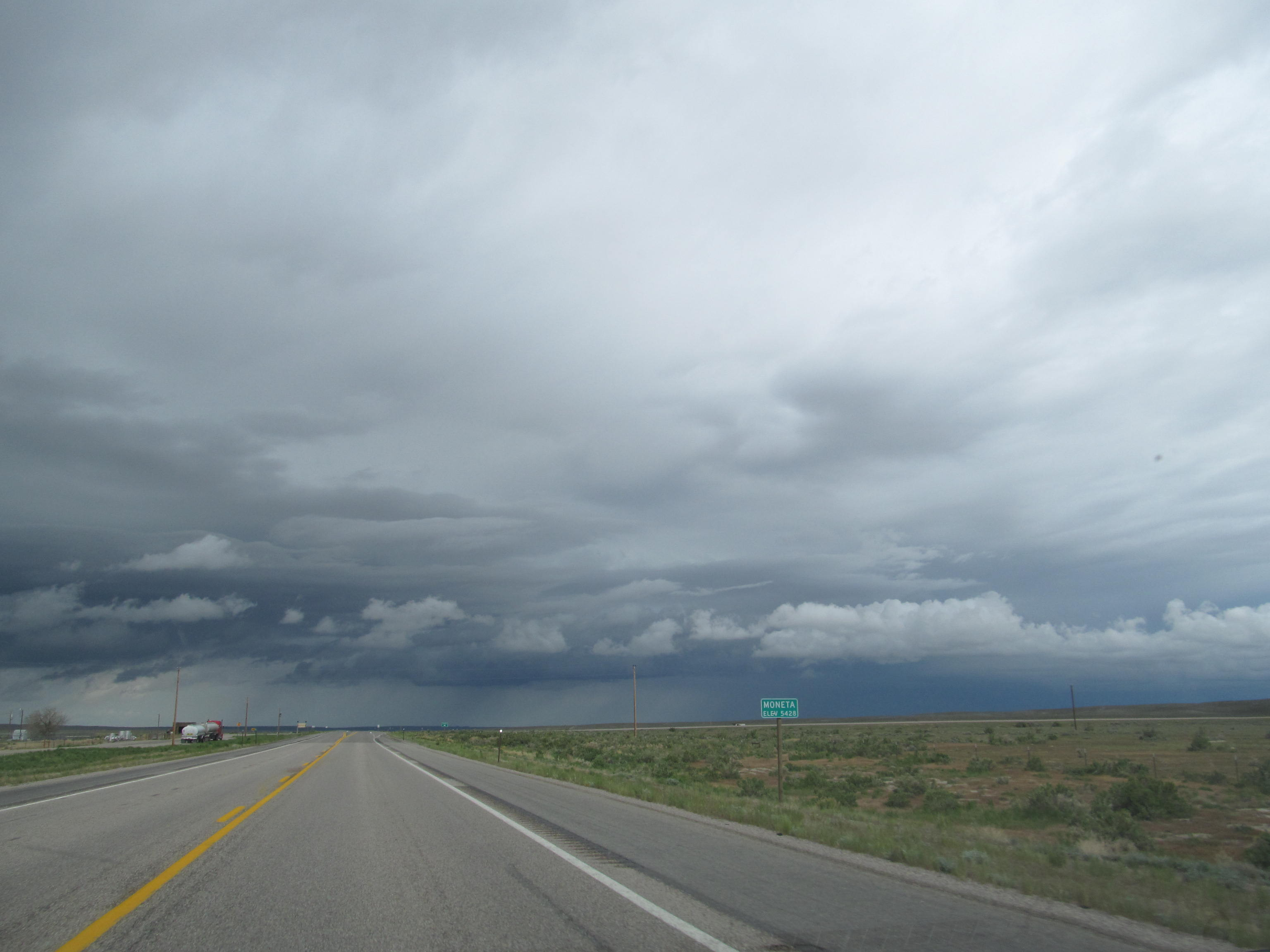
- Westbound on US 20 / US 26 entering Moneta, June 2014

- Location within Wyoming Location within the United States
- Coordinates: 43°09′42″N 107°43′29″W
- Country: United States
- State: Wyoming
- County: Fremont
- Elevation: 5,440 ft (1,660 m)
- Time zone: UTC-7 (Mountain (MST))
  - Summer (DST): UTC-6 (MDT)
- Area code: 307
- GNIS feature ID: 1609126

Moneta is an unincorporated community in Fremont County, Wyoming, United States.

== Description ==
Moneta is located on U.S. Route 20 / U.S. Route 26, 20.1 miles (32.3 km) east-southeast of Shoshoni. It is also located close to the geographic center of the state. There is only a single ranching facility at Moneta now, the infrastructure, buildings and homes of the once-thriving village having been torn down and the land converted to private ranch property.

== History ==
As the Chicago and North Western Transportation Company built a line west from Casper in 1905–06, Moneta was made a stop (about 82.6 miles [132.9 km] west of Casper), and was laid out in 1906. It was named after Moneta, Iowa. A post office was established in Moneta in 1906, and remained in operation until it was discontinued in 1972.

In 2002, the vehicle in the "Lil' Miss murder" was uncovered in Moneta after DNA evidence linked the landowner, Dale Wayne Eaton, to the murder of Lisa Kimmell. Following a civil suit in which Eaton's land was given to Kimmell's parents, the buildings on the property were burned to the ground.
