= Hudson, Wyoming =

Hudson, Wyoming Boo'oowu' (Arapaho)
- Town
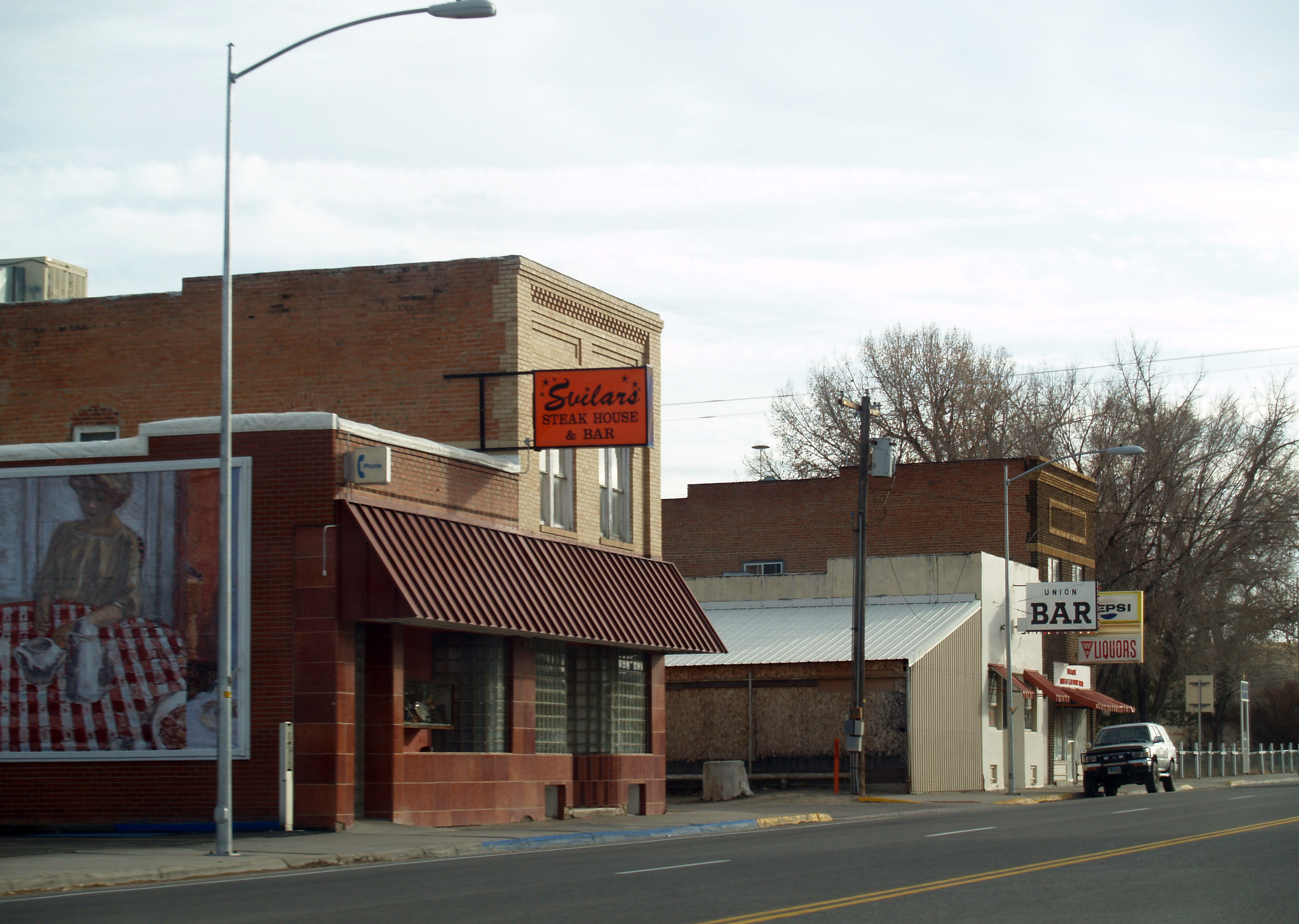
- Downtown Hudson

- Location of Hudson in Fremont County, Wyoming
- Coordinates: 42°54′10″N 108°34′56″W
- Country: United States
- State: Wyoming
- County: Fremont

Area
  - Total: 0.42 sq mi (1.10 km^{2})
  - Land: 0.42 sq mi (1.10 km^{2})
  - Water: 0 sq mi (0.00 km^{2})
- Elevation: 5,085 ft (1,550 m)

Population (2020)
  - Total: 431
  - Density: 1,044.4/sq mi (403.26/km^{2})
- Time zone: UTC-7 (Mountain (MST))
  - Summer (DST): UTC-6 (MDT)
- ZIP code: 82515
- Area code: 307
- FIPS code: 56-38960
- GNIS feature ID: 2412777
- Website: www.hudsonwy.org

Hudson (Arapaho: Boo'oowu') is a town in Fremont County, Wyoming, United States. As of the 2020 census, Hudson had a population of 431.

== History ==
A post office called Hudson has been in operation since 1907. The town was named for John T. Hudson, the original owner of the town site.

== Geography ==
According to the United States Census Bureau, the town has a total area of 0.43 square miles (1.11 km^{2}), all land. The northernmost part of the town (north of First Street) is located within the Wind River Indian Reservation.

== Demographics ==
Historical population
Census	Pop.	Note	%±
1910	319		—
1920	977		206.3%
1930	328		−66.4%
1940	330		0.6%
1950	293		−11.2%
1960	369		25.9%
1970	381		3.3%
1980	514		34.9%
1990	392		−23.7%
2000	407		3.8%
2010	458		12.5%
2020	431		−5.9%
U.S. Decennial Census

=== 2010 census ===
At the 2010 census, there were 458 people, 193 households and 134 families residing in the town. The population density was 1,065.1 per square mile (411.2/km^{2}). There were 230 housing units at an average density of 534.9 per square mile (206.5/km^{2}). The racial make-up of the town was 90.2% White, 6.8% Native American, 1.1% from other races and 2.0% from two or more races. Hispanic or Latino of any race were 3.7% of the population.

There were 193 households, of which 29.5% had children under the age of 18 living with them, 50.8% were married couples living together, 10.4% had a female householder with no husband present, 8.3% had a male householder with no wife present and 30.6% were non-families. 26.4% of all households were made up of individuals and 7.2% had someone living alone who was 65 years of age or older. The average household size was 2.37 and the average family size was 2.76.

The median age was 42.3 years. 23.4% of residents were under the age of 18, 7.6% were between the ages of 18 and 24, 23.4% were from 25 to 44, 30% were from 45 to 64 and 15.7% were 65 years of age or older. The sex make-up of the town was 50.4% male and 49.6% female.

=== 2000 census ===
At the 2000 census, there were 407 people, 171 households and 112 families residing in the town. The population density was 968.4 per square mile (373.9/km^{2}). There were 209 housing units at an average density of 497.3 per square mile (192.0/km^{2}). The racial make-up of the town was 92.63% White, 0.25% African American, 2.21% Native American, 1.47% from other races and 3.44% from two or more races. Hispanic or Latino of any race were 4.91% of the population.

There were 171 households, of which 26.3% had children under the age of 18 living with them, 52.0% were married couples living together, 9.9% had a female householder with no husband present and 34.5% were non-families. 32.2% of all households were made up of individuals and 13.5% had someone living alone who was 65 years of age or older. The average household size was 2.38 and the average family size was 3.03.

25.8% of the population were under the age of 18, 6.1% from 18 to 24, 26.5% from 25 to 44, 24.8% from 45 to 64 and 16.7% were 65 years of age or older. The median age was 40 years. For every 100 females, there were 99.5 males. For every 100 females age 18 and over, there were 93.6 males.

The median household income was $26,563 and the median family income was $34,375. Males had a median income of $30,469 and females $19,125. The per capita income was $15,515. About 12.5% of families and 13.1% of the population were below the poverty line, including 16.1% of those under age 18 and 16.0% of those age 65 or over.

== Education ==
Public education in the town of Hudson is provided by Fremont County School District Number 1. The Yablonski Memorial Library reopened in November, 2024 and is open on Mondays from 2pm-6pm. It was formerly a United Mine Workers of America union hall. When the building was originally transferred to the town it was named in honor of Jock Yablonski.
