= Lander, Wyoming =

- City
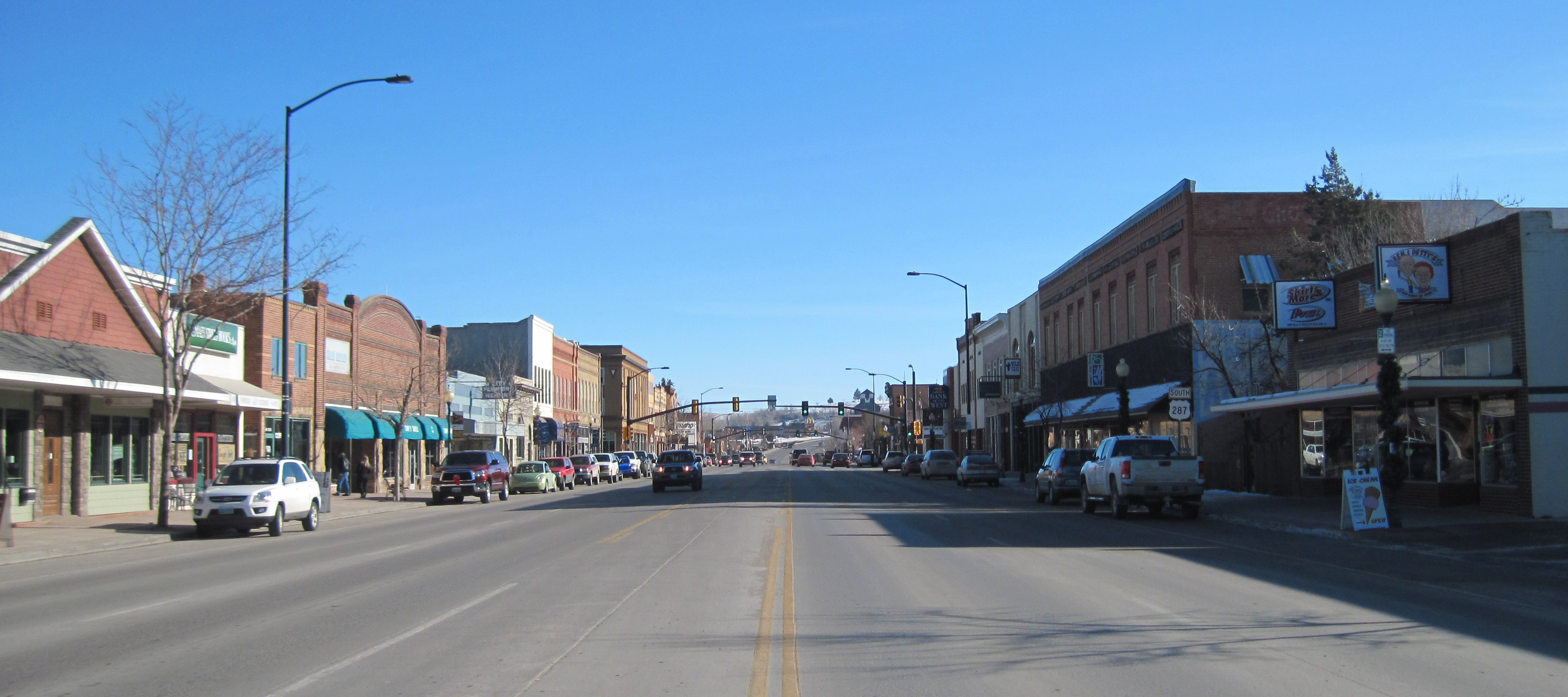
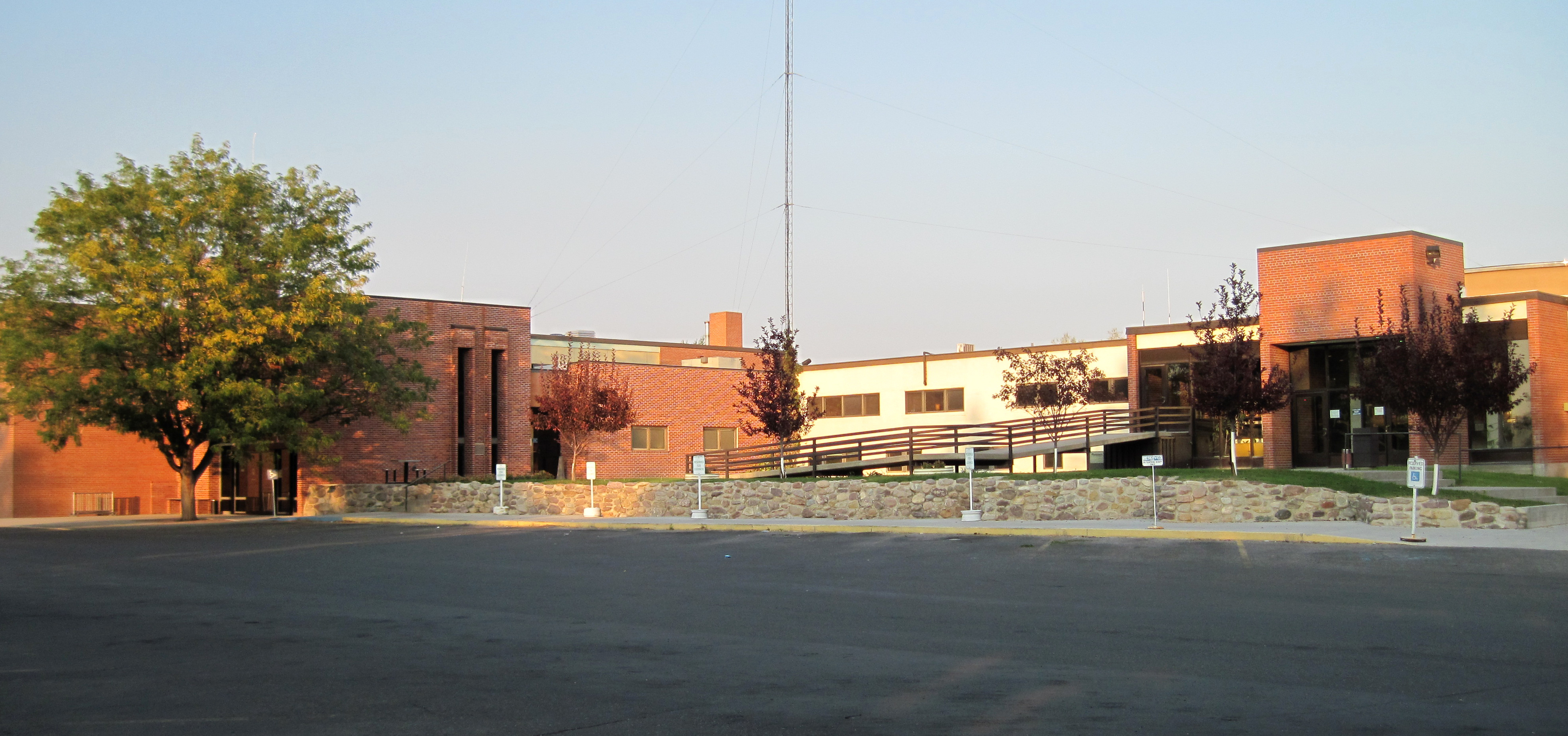
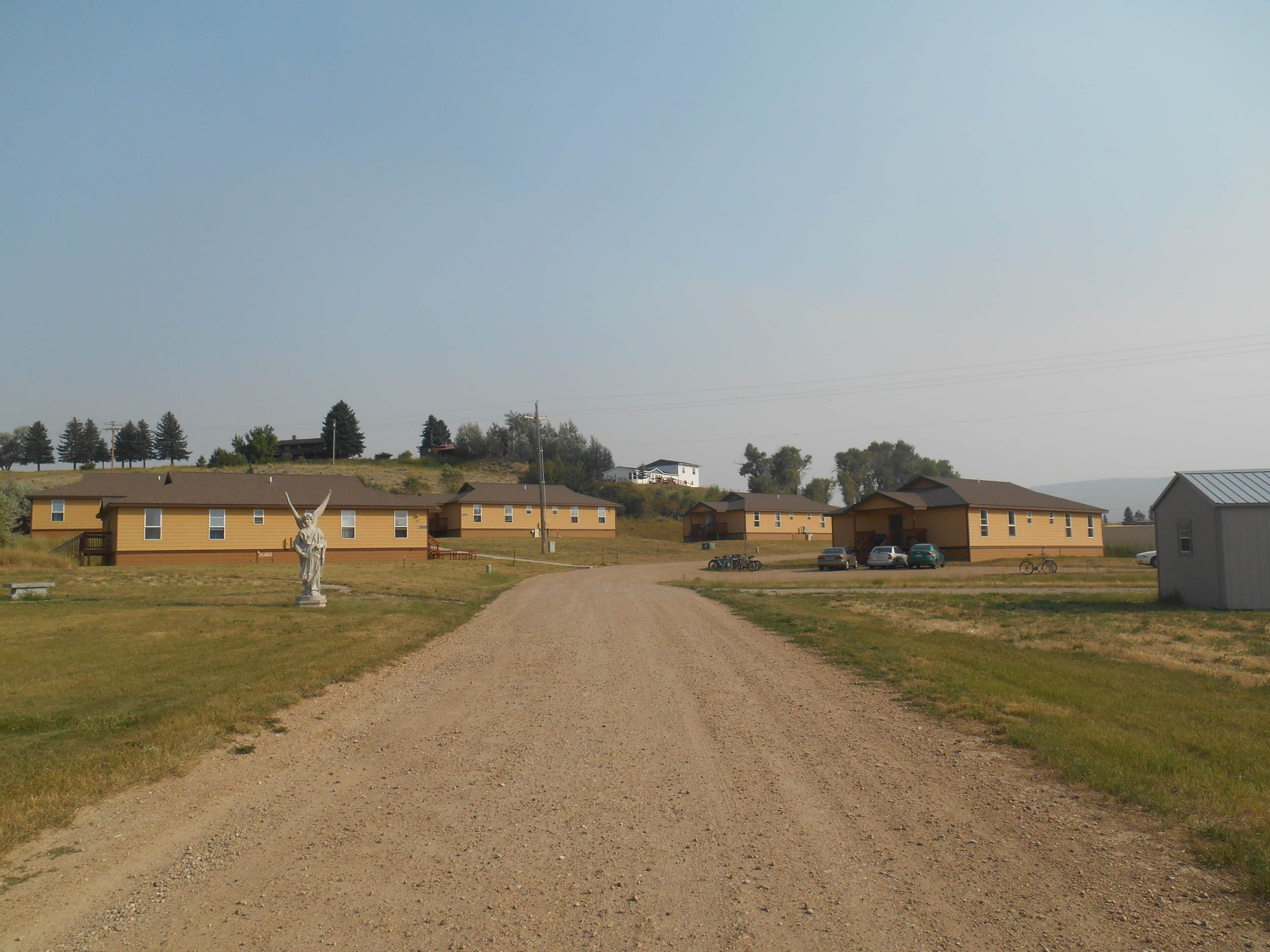
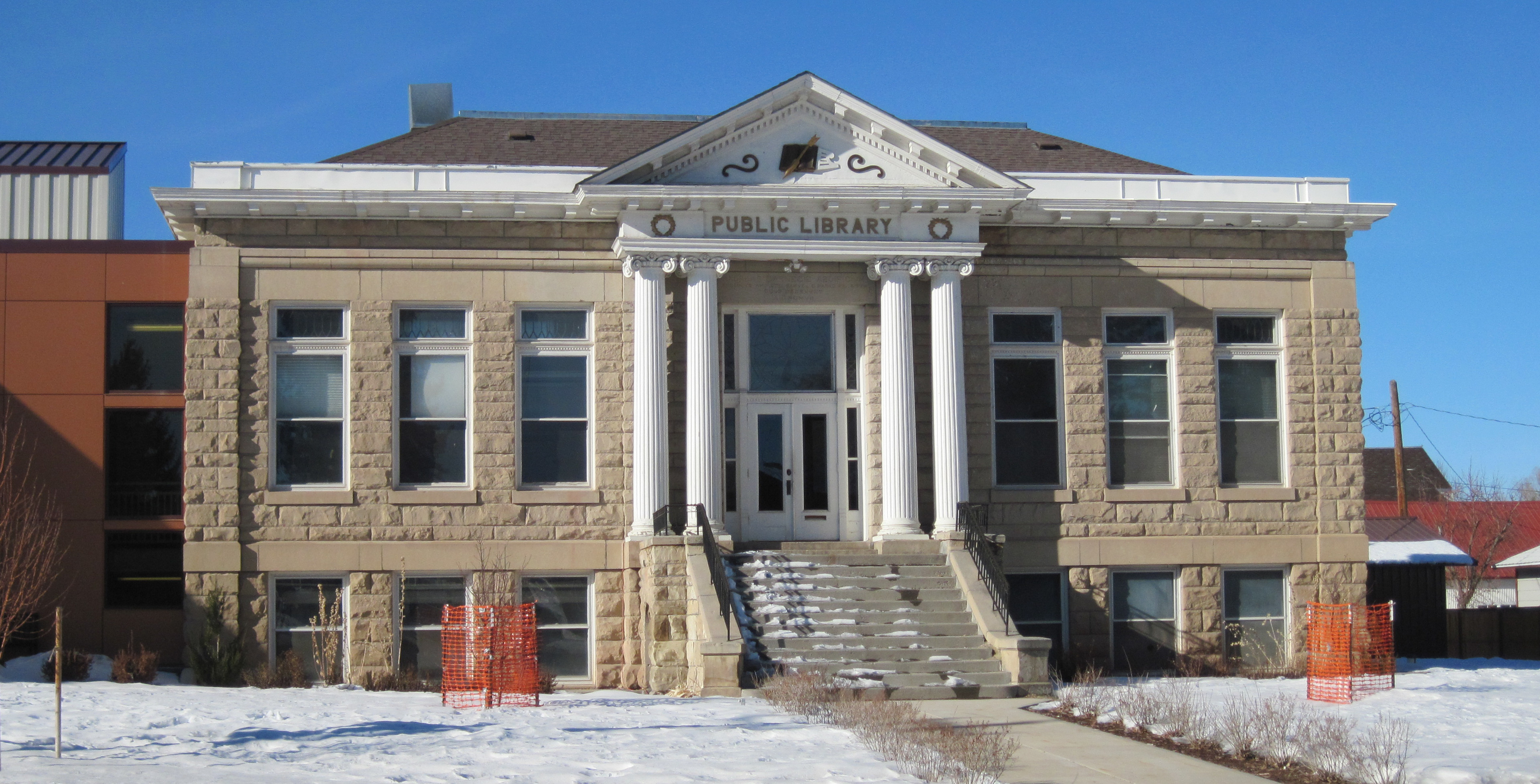
- Downtown Lander Fremont County Courthouse Wyoming Catholic College Fremont County Library

- Seal
- Motto: "Real. Western. Spirit."
- Location of Lander in Fremont County, Wyoming
- Coordinates: 42°49′49″N 108°45′40″W
- Country: United States
- State: Wyoming
- County: Fremont

Area
  - Total: 9.38 sq mi (24.30 km^{2})
  - Land: 9.38 sq mi (24.30 km^{2})
  - Water: 0 sq mi (0.00 km^{2})
- Elevation: 5,358 ft (1,633 m)

Population (2020)
  - Total: 7,546
  - Density: 794.9/sq mi (306.92/km^{2})
- Time zone: UTC−7 (Mountain (MST))
  - Summer (DST): UTC−6 (MDT)
- ZIP code: 82520
- Area code: 307
- FIPS code: 56-44760
- GNIS feature ID: 2411622
- Website: www.landerwy.gov

Lander is a city in and the county seat of Fremont County, Wyoming. It is located in central Wyoming, along the Middle Fork of the Popo Agie River, just south of the Wind River Indian Reservation. It is a tourism center with several nearby guest ranches. Its population was 7,546 at the 2020 census.

== History ==
Lander was previously known as Pushroot, Old Camp Brown and Fort Augur. Its present name was chosen in 1875 in reference to General Frederick W. Lander, a transcontinental explorer who surveyed the Oregon Trail's Lander Cutoff.

=== 19th century ===
In 1868, the boundaries of the Wind River Indian Reservation were officially established by the Fort Bridger Treaty, setting its southern border along the Sweetwater River. This marked the beginning of increased conflicts between the Shoshone tribe and white settlers, who were illegally encroaching on reservation lands. Additionally, it became evident to the U.S. Government that much of the land east of the Wind River Range on the reservation was considered desirable.

In response in 1872 Congress approved negotiations with Shoshone leaders, including Chief Washakie. These negotiations took place at Camp Stambaugh during the summer of 1872 and culminated in the Shoshone's agreement to cede the southern part of their reservation. The agreement provided the tribe with $25,000, $5,000 in stock cattle, and an annual salary of $500 for Chief Washakie over five years.

The year 1873 saw The Jones Expedition explore the area around what would become the town of Lander, establishing a route to Yellowstone National Park. This exploration resulted in extensive documentation of natural features, including hot springs, oil reserves, and hieroglyphs. Notably, the Dallas Dome area, situated several miles southeast of the future town-site near today's U.S. Route 287, was identified as the site of Wyoming's first oil well, completed in 1883. The town of Lander was officially incorporated on July 17, 1890.

=== 20th century ===
On October 1, 1906, Lander became the westward terminus of the "Cowboy Line" of the Chicago and North Western Railway, thus originating the slogan "where rails end and trails begin." Originally intended to be a transcontinental mainline to Coos Bay, Oregon, or Eureka, California, the line never went further west, and service to Lander was abandoned in 1972. With the arrival of the railroad, Lander's population more than doubled between 1900 and 1910. At the turn of the century the town and surrounding valley were promising places for agricultural development due to the area's climate and potential for irrigation. At the time there were several new ventures around the town producing wool, wheat, oats, alfalfa, hay, vegetables, small fruit and in some cases orchards. However, a report from the State of Wyoming published in 1907 says agriculture around Lander only supplies local demand. In 1962 U.S. Steel opened the Atlantic City iron ore and mill, 35 miles (56 km) south of Lander near Atlantic City The mine was a significant employer in Lander, but by 1983 it ceased operations.

=== 21st century ===
Lander continues to evolve and faces similar issues as many small towns in the Western United States. Education and outdoor recreation play a large role in the town's economy with the Wyoming Catholic College and National Outdoor Leadership School both based in Lander. Though agriculture and resource extraction no longer play a large role in the town's economy, its population has continued to grow since the year 2000.

== Geography ==
According to the United States Census Bureau, the city has a total area of 4.67 square miles (12.10 km^{2}), all land.

Sinks Canyon in the Wind River Range is close to Lander. Elk migrate out of the Wind River Range into the lowlands near Lander, arriving in early winter and frequently staying at least through calving season in the spring. The town is located in the Wind River Basin.

=== Climate ===
According to the Köppen Climate Classification system, Lander has a warm-summer humid continental climate, abbreviated "Dfb" on climate maps. The hottest temperature recorded in Lander was 102 °F (39 °C) on July 27, 1935, while the coldest temperature recorded was −40 °F (−40 °C) on December 19, 1924, and February 8, 1936.

Climate data for Lander, Wyoming (Hunt Field), 1991–2020 normals, extremes 1891–present
Month	Jan	Feb	Mar	Apr	May	Jun	Jul	Aug	Sep	Oct	Nov	Dec	Year
Record high °F (°C)	64 (18)	68 (20)	82 (28)	83 (28)	93 (34)	100 (38)	102 (39)	101 (38)	99 (37)	86 (30)	72 (22)	65 (18)	102 (39)
Mean maximum °F (°C)	51.1 (10.6)	54.5 (12.5)	66.7 (19.3)	75.4 (24.1)	83.0 (28.3)	91.5 (33.1)	97.0 (36.1)	95.2 (35.1)	88.8 (31.6)	78.5 (25.8)	64.4 (18.0)	53.4 (11.9)	97.5 (36.4)
Mean daily maximum °F (°C)	32.8 (0.4)	36.6 (2.6)	48.6 (9.2)	56.2 (13.4)	66.1 (18.9)	78.0 (25.6)	87.7 (30.9)	85.8 (29.9)	74.6 (23.7)	58.9 (14.9)	44.3 (6.8)	32.9 (0.5)	58.5 (14.7)
Daily mean °F (°C)	21.3 (−5.9)	25.0 (−3.9)	36.0 (2.2)	43.2 (6.2)	52.8 (11.6)	62.8 (17.1)	71.5 (21.9)	69.8 (21.0)	59.6 (15.3)	45.4 (7.4)	32.1 (0.1)	21.6 (−5.8)	45.1 (7.3)
Mean daily minimum °F (°C)	9.8 (−12.3)	13.3 (−10.4)	23.4 (−4.8)	30.3 (−0.9)	39.4 (4.1)	47.7 (8.7)	55.2 (12.9)	53.8 (12.1)	44.6 (7.0)	32.0 (0.0)	19.9 (−6.7)	10.2 (−12.1)	31.6 (−0.2)
Mean minimum °F (°C)	−10.3 (−23.5)	−6.1 (−21.2)	5.5 (−14.7)	17.2 (−8.2)	27.5 (−2.5)	36.8 (2.7)	46.6 (8.1)	44.9 (7.2)	31.0 (−0.6)	14.3 (−9.8)	1.1 (−17.2)	−10.0 (−23.3)	−17.0 (−27.2)
Record low °F (°C)	−39 (−39)	−40 (−40)	−24 (−31)	−11 (−24)	13 (−11)	25 (−4)	32 (0)	23 (−5)	7 (−14)	−14 (−26)	−31 (−35)	−40 (−40)	−40 (−40)
Average precipitation inches (mm)	0.51 (13)	0.70 (18)	1.29 (33)	2.07 (53)	2.68 (68)	1.08 (27)	0.59 (15)	0.52 (13)	0.98 (25)	1.40 (36)	0.78 (20)	0.63 (16)	13.23 (336)
Average snowfall inches (cm)	8.2 (21)	12.1 (31)	14.4 (37)	16.4 (42)	4.5 (11)	0.1 (0.25)	0.0 (0.0)	0.0 (0.0)	1.5 (3.8)	10.5 (27)	10.6 (27)	9.3 (24)	87.6 (223)
Average precipitation days (≥ 0.01 in)	4.1	5.4	5.8	8.4	9.1	5.9	4.7	5.0	5.7	5.9	4.9	4.3	69.2
Average snowy days (≥ 0.1 in)	4.3	5.4	4.7	5.5	1.8	0.1	0.0	0.0	0.6	3.6	4.4	4.9	35.3
Mean monthly sunshine hours	192.2	203.4	257.3	270.0	294.5	330.0	347.2	328.6	273.0	232.5	174.0	173.6	3,076.3
Percentage possible sunshine	66.3	68.6	69.8	67.2	64.9	71.7	74.5	76.0	72.7	67.8	59.6	62.1	68.4
Source 1: NOAA
Source 2: HKO (sun only, 1961−1990)

== Demographics ==
Historical population
Census	Pop.	Note	%±
1880	193		—
1890	525		172.0%
1900	737		40.4%
1910	1,812		145.9%
1920	2,133		17.7%
1930	1,826		−14.4%
1940	2,594		42.1%
1950	3,349		29.1%
1960	4,182		24.9%
1970	7,125		70.4%
1980	7,867		10.4%
1990	7,023		−10.7%
2000	6,867		−2.2%
2010	7,487		9.0%
2020	7,546		0.8%
2023 (est.)	7,615		0.9%
U.S. Decennial Census

=== 2020 census ===
As of the 2020 census, Lander had a population of 7,546. The median age was 39.4 years. 23.3% of residents were under the age of 18 and 20.1% of residents were 65 years of age or older. For every 100 females there were 93.4 males, and for every 100 females age 18 and over there were 88.8 males age 18 and over.

92.3% of residents lived in urban areas, while 7.7% lived in rural areas.

There were 3,135 households in Lander, of which 28.5% had children under the age of 18 living in them. Of all households, 45.6% were married-couple households, 18.5% were households with a male householder and no spouse or partner present, and 28.8% were households with a female householder and no spouse or partner present. About 33.3% of all households were made up of individuals and 14.6% had someone living alone who was 65 years of age or older.

There were 3,454 housing units, of which 9.2% were vacant. The homeowner vacancy rate was 1.3% and the rental vacancy rate was 10.0%.

Racial composition as of the 2020 census
Race	Number	Percent
White	6,287	83.3%
Black or African American	52	0.7%
American Indian and Alaska Native	456	6.0%
Asian	84	1.1%
Native Hawaiian and Other Pacific Islander	0	0.0%
Some other race	119	1.6%
Two or more races	548	7.3%
Hispanic or Latino (of any race)	454	6.0%

=== 2010 census ===
As of the census of 2010, there were 7,487 people, 3,161 households, and 1,932 families residing in the city. The population density was 1,603.2 inhabitants per square mile (619.0/km^{2}). There were 3,385 housing units at an average density of 724.8 per square mile (279.8/km^{2}). The racial makeup of the city was 88.0% White, 0.2% African American, 7.3% Native American, 0.6% Asian, 1.0% from other races, and 2.9% from two or more races. Hispanic or Latino of any race were 4.8% of the population.

There were 3,161 households, of which 28.3% had children under the age of 18 living with them, 46.2% were married couples living together, 10.9% had a female householder with no husband present, 4.0% had a male householder with no wife present, and 38.9% were non-families. 32.0% of all households were made up of individuals, and 13% had someone living alone who was 65 years of age or older. The average household size was 2.30 and the average family size was 2.85.

The median age in the city was 40.3 years. 22.4% of residents were under the age of 18; 8% were between the ages of 18 and 24; 25.3% were from 25 to 44; 27.3% were from 45 to 64; and 17% were 65 years of age or older. The gender makeup of the city was 49.0% male and 51.0% female.

=== 2000 census ===
As of the census of 2000, there were 6,867 people, 2,794 households, and 1,824 families residing in the city. The population density was 1,554.0 people per square mile (599.9/km^{2}). There were 3,036 housing units at an average density of 687.0 per square mile (265.2/km^{2}). The racial makeup of the city was 90.81% White, 0.15% African American, 5.99% Native American, 0.32% Asian, 0.70% from other races, and 2.04% from two or more races. Hispanic or Latino of any race were 3.48% of the population.

There were 2,794 households, out of which 30.4% had children under the age of 18 living with them, 51.5% were married couples living together, 10.1% had a female householder with no husband present, and 34.7% were non-families. 30.0% of all households were made up of individuals, and 12.5% had someone living alone who was 65 years of age or older. The average household size was 2.34 and the average family size was 2.91.

In the city, the population was spread out, with 24.1% under the age of 18, 7.1% from 18 to 24, 26.7% from 25 to 44, 25.5% from 45 to 64, and 16.6% who were 65 years of age or older. The median age was 40 years. For every 100 females, there were 95.4 males. For every 100 females age 18 and over, there were 89.2 males.

The median income for a household in the city was $32,397, and the median income for a family was $41,958. Males had a median income of $30,602 versus $20,916 for females. The per capita income for the city was $18,389. About 9.9% of families and 13.2% of the population were below the poverty line, including 19.3% of those under age 18 and 9.3% of those age 65 or over.

== Economy ==
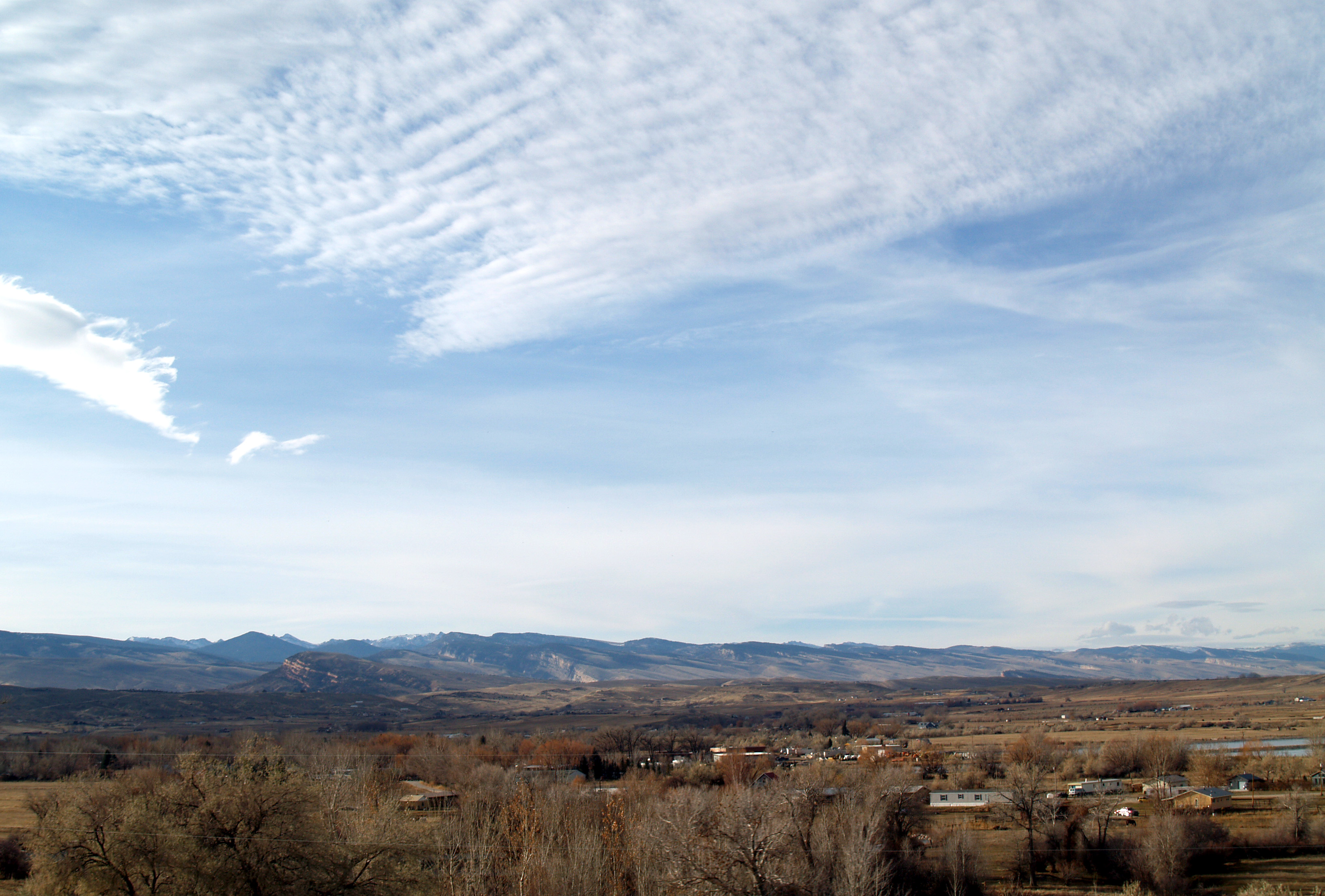
Suburban Lander

Lander's economy is based on an array of industries and, like Wyoming as a whole, is supported by substantial tourism. Outdoor recreation along with healthcare, education, construction and retail sales make up much of the economy. The tourism season is primarily during summer months and though Lander and Fremont County are not near any major Interstate highway, the county generates significant income from travel related taxes.

Lander is home to numerous state and federal government offices, including the U.S. Forest Service (Washakie Ranger District, Shoshone National Forest), the Bureau of Land Management (Lander Field Office), the U.S. Fish and Wildlife Service, and a Resident Agency of the Denver Field Office of the FBI, as well as the Wyoming Life Resource Center and the Wyoming Department of Environmental Quality. A major bronze foundry, Eagle Bronze, is located in Lander, as is the headquarters of the National Outdoor Leadership School (NOLS) and other environment and land-related non profit organizations including offices of the Wyoming Outdoor Council, the Wyoming office of The Nature Conservancy, the Wyoming Wildlife Federation, and Wyoming Catholic College.

=== 2017 economic sector statistics ===
Sectors of the Lander economy in 2017

Occupation	Percent of Workforce
Office & Administrative Support Occupations	13%
Education, Training, & Library Occupations	12%
Health Diagnosing & Treating Practitioners & Other Technical Occupations	7%
Construction & Extraction Occupations	7%
Management Occupations	7%
Installation, Maintenance, & Repair Occupations	6%
Sales & Related Occupations	6%
Personal Care & Service Occupations	5%
Food Preparation & Serving Related Occupations	5%
Building & Grounds Cleaning & Maintenance Occupations	4%
Community & Social Service Occupations	3%
Healthcare Support Occupations	3%
Transportation Occupations	3%
Production Occupations	3%
Life, Physical, & Social Science Occupations	2%
Material Moving Occupations	2%
Business & Financial Operations Occupations	2%
Health Technologists & Technicians	1%
Architecture & Engineering Occupations	1%
Arts, Design, Entertainment, Sports, & Media Occupations	1%
Law Enforcement Workers Including Supervisors	1%
Legal Occupations	1%
Fire Fighting & Prevention, & Other Protective Service Workers Including Supervisors	1%
Farming, Fishing, & Forestry Occupations	1%

== Media ==
Publications and websites covering or based in the Lander area include:

=== Print/website ===
- Lander Journal
- Wyofile
- County 10
- Lander Talk

=== Radio ===
- KLDY 97.5 FM
- KOVE - 1330 AM

== Arts and culture ==
The Lander Art Center downtown displays rotating art exhibits, holds biannual art fairs, and hosts varying art classes. The work of William Shakespeare is performed by the touring Wyoming Shakespeare Festival Company, a non-profit organization based out of Lander. The Lander Community Concerts Association has brought in various performing artists since 1947. Lander's local library is the main branch of the Fremont County Library System, the original local Carnegie library still stands as part of the current building.

In the early 1990s, the St. Louis based chamber-pop band, Lydia's Trumpet, recorded their song, "Lander" on the cassette release entitled: Valentine Waffle. The song is based on the city, its founder, and a nostalgic summer road trip there.

The town is one of the headquarters of Asthmatic Kitty Records, founded by Sufjan Stevens.

=== Annual cultural events ===
The Pioneer Days Parade and Rodeo takes place on July 3 and 4 every year.

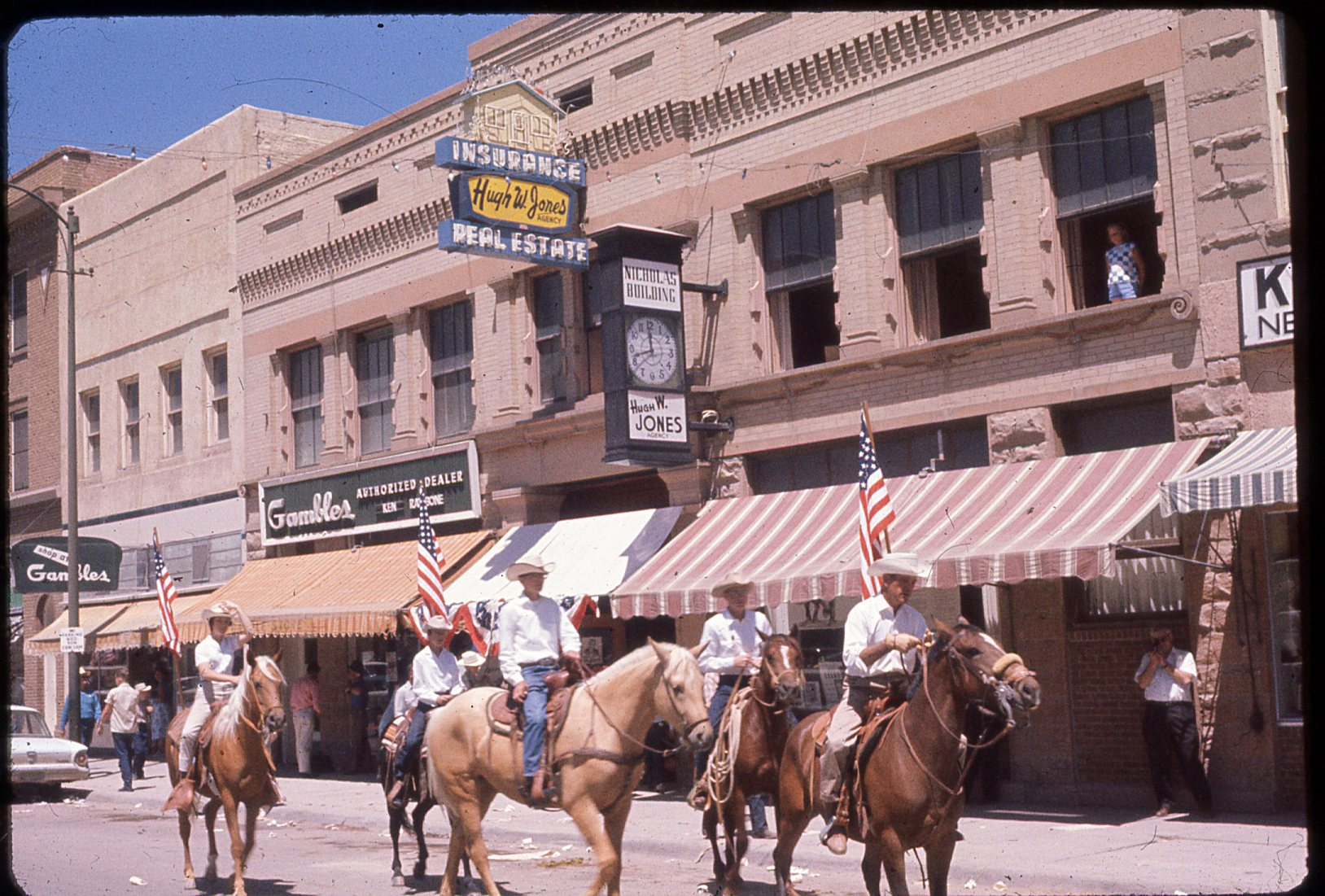
Lander's Fourth of July Parade in 1962.

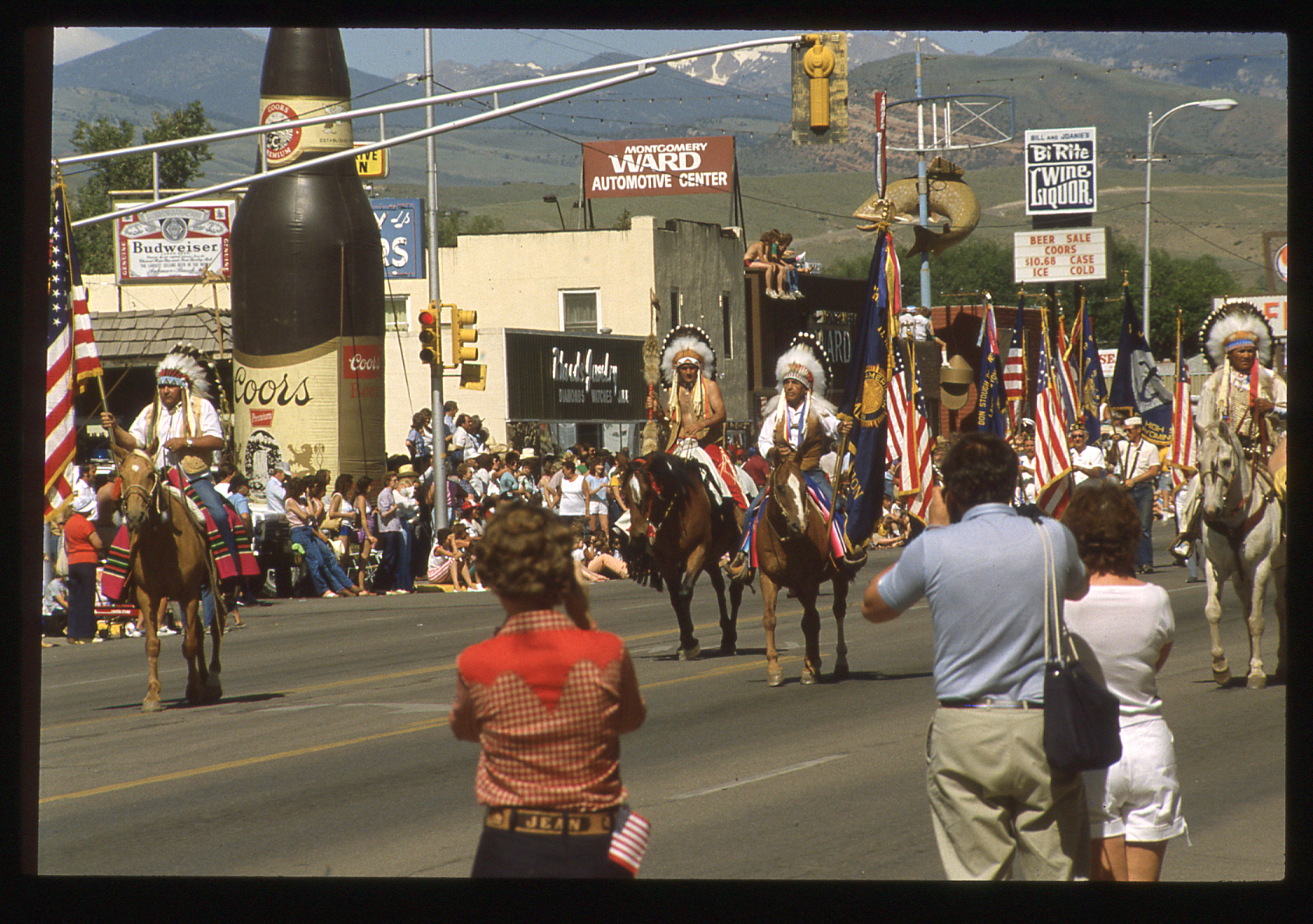
July 4 parade on Main St in 1984.

The Lander Brew Festival features samples from Rocky Mountain-area breweries and has been held since 2002.

Lander is also home to the Wyoming State Winter Fair. In addition to Livestock showings, there are also plenty of rodeo activities to see or participate in.

Other annual events include the International Climbers Festival, and the Annual One Shot Antelope Hunt.

=== Attractions ===
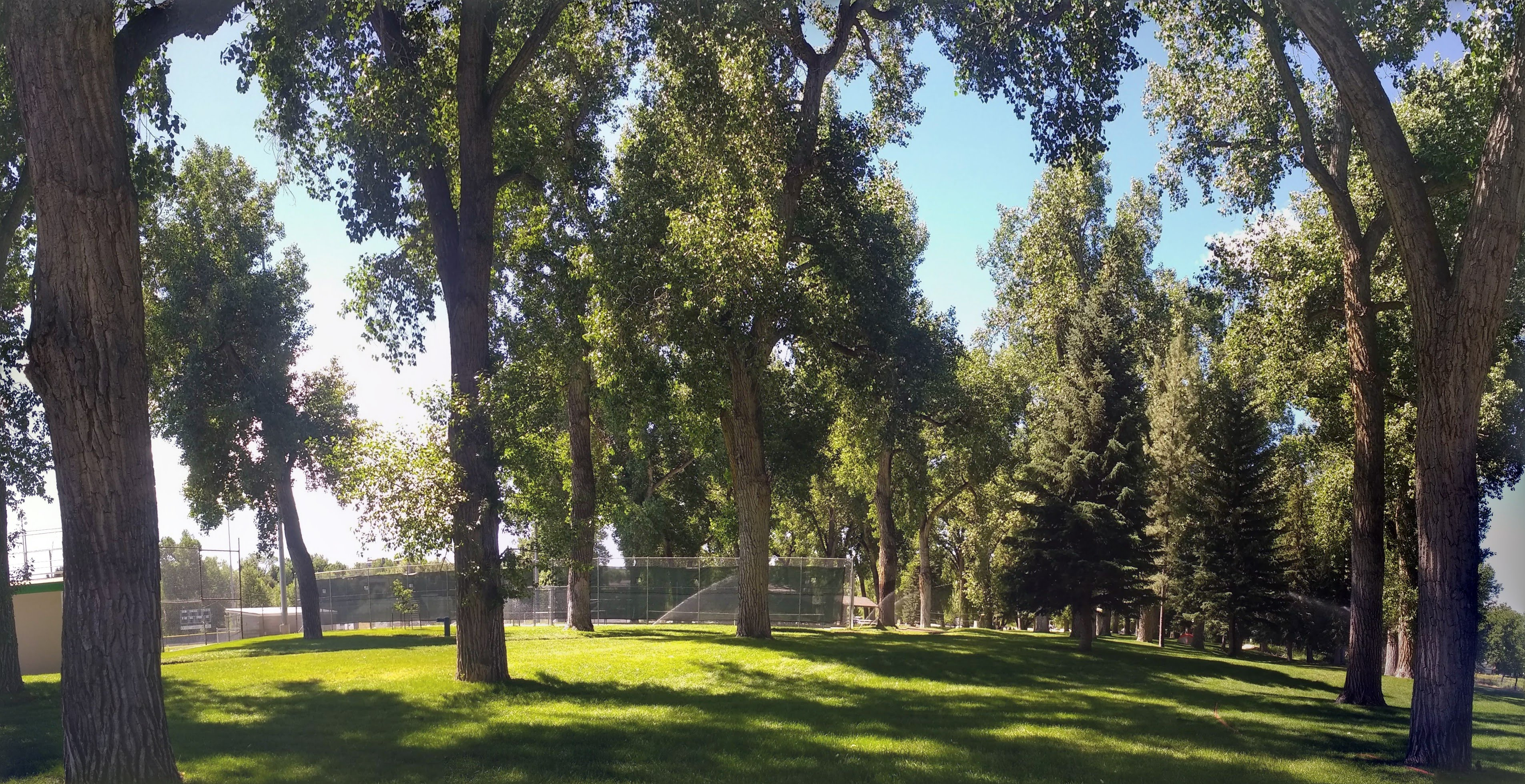
Lander City Park located on the south end of town provides camping space and hosts a number of events in summer.

Outdoor attractions near Lander include Sinks Canyon State Park, Worthen Meadow Reservoir, Shoshone National Forest, the Wind River Range, and the Red Desert. Additionally, Lander is home to a number of museums, including the Fremont County Pioneer Museum, which focuses on the history of the Lander area; the Museum of the American West, which maintains a complex of historic structures; the Sacagawea Cemetery, the cemetery is located near Fort Washakie, 15 miles (24 km) north of Lander on the Wind River Indian Reservation; the Lander Children's Museum, with hands-on exhibits; and the Evans Dahl Memorial Museum, dedicated to the Annual One Shot Antelope Hunt. Several locations in Lander are listed on the National Register of Historic Places including the Lander Downtown Historic District, Jackson Park Town Site Addition Brick Row and the US Post Office and Courthouse-Lander Main

== Government ==
Lander's city government is made up of an elected mayor, six-member city council, city clerk, treasurer and other departments, committees and appointed boards. City elections are on a non-partisan basis with council members elected based on wards where they live with two council members elected for each ward.

Since 1998, Lander and Fremont County have been represented in the Wyoming State Senate by economist/businessman Cale Case, a Republican.

== Education ==
=== Public education ===
Public education in the city of Lander is provided by Fremont County School District #1. Lander Valley High School is the main high school. It is located just west of Main Street after the demolition of the historic high school. Despite attempts to preserve the school the land was sold and is now a business complex. Pathfinder is the alternative high school.

=== National Outdoor Leadership School ===
The National Outdoor Leadership School (NOLS) was founded in Lander and is headquartered in the city. Its Rocky Mountain branch operates out of Lander. NOLS operates the Noble Hotel on Main Street for its instructors, students and alumni.

=== Wyoming Catholic College ===
In 2007, Wyoming Catholic College, a four-year, coeducational, private college was founded in Lander. The college was only the second four-year brick and mortar institution of higher education ever in Wyoming. It was designed to give students a general liberal arts education via a Great Books curriculum, while allowing them to develop morally and spiritually in a small Catholic community. It uses an Outdoor Adventure Program to take students into the nearby Wind River Range to teach leadership, decision-making skills, and to ignite their imaginations. The college received its Apostolic Blessing in 2005 from Most Reverend David L. Ricken, DD, JCL, the Bishop of Cheyenne. As of 2019, Wyoming Catholic College received full accreditation by the Higher Learning Commission.

== Infrastructure ==
=== Health care ===
The Wyoming Department of Health Wyoming Life Resource Center (WLRC), originally the Wyoming State Training School (WSTS), a residential facility for physically and mentally disabled people, is located in Lander. The facility was operated by the Wyoming Board of Charities and Reform until that agency was dissolved as a result of a state constitutional amendment passed in November 1990.

=== Postal service ===
The United States Postal Service operates the Lander Post Office.

=== Airports ===
There is a small general aviation airport in Lander, called Hunt Field. Scheduled passenger airline service is available via the Central Wyoming Regional Airport located near Riverton, Wyoming.

=== Law enforcement ===
The law enforcement within Lander consists of the Lander Police Department.

== Notable people ==
- Jim Allen (born 1952), a former member of the Wyoming House of Representatives, who was born in Lander
- Keri Ataumbi (born 1971), Kiowa artist, who was born on the Wind River Indian Reservation near Lander
- Steve Bechtel (born 1970), a rock climber with a number of first ascents in his record; Born in Casper, as an adult he lives and works in Lander
- Cale Case (born 1958), economist, businessman, politician; born in Lander
- Mike Dabich (born 1942), professional basketball center who played one season in the American Basketball Association
- Clayton Danks (1879–1970), the model of the cowboy on the Wyoming state trademark, the Bucking Horse and Rider, is interred at Mount Hope Cemetery in Lander.
- Ed Drew (1865–1911), born in Lander, was an Arizona rancher, miner, and lawman in the final years of the Old West
- Teri Greeves (born 1970), Native American beadwork artist, was born on the Wind River Indian Reservation near Lander
- Lester C. Hunt (1892–1954), 19th governor of Wyoming, U.S. Senator known as an outspoken opponent of Senator Joseph McCarthy
- Ralph Kimball (1878–1959), former Justice of the Wyoming Supreme Court, who lived as an adult in Lander
- Larry LaRose (born 1953), NASA flight engineer, shuttle training aircraft, is a native of Lander.
- Nate Marquardt (born 1979), mixed martial artist and current welterweight in the UFC, was born in Lander
- Barney McLean (1917–2005), alpine skier, competed in three events at the 1948 Winter Olympics, born in Lander
- Joseph B. Meyer (1941–2012), Wyoming attorney general and state treasurer was an assistant county attorney in Lander early in his political career
- Helen Mowery (1922-2008), Miss Wyoming 1939, stage, film, and television actress, born in Casper, raised in Lander
- Bob Nicholas (born 1957), Wyoming State representative from District 8 in Cheyenne, is a native of Lander
- Phil Nicholas (born 1955), Republican member of the Wyoming Senate, born in Lander
- Sacagawea (c. 1788–c. 1884), from the Lemhi Shoshone tribe; assisted Lewis and Clark on their trek of discovery across the northwest
- Todd Skinner (1958–2006), free climber, who lived in Lander as an adult to be near its dolomite cliffs
- Guy Trosper (1911–1963), screenwriter who was born in Lander and is buried there
- Seth Brady Tucker (born 1969), poet, who was born in Lander
- Herman Gould Nickerson (1841-1927), American pioneer, US Army Captain, Indian agent, Wyoming Legislature member, and Lander Judge

== In popular culture ==
The 1926 film War Paint was shot in and around the Wind River Indian Reservation and Lander.

The 2017 film Wind River is partially set in Lander, and features a shot of Main Street.

In 2025, YouTuber Any Austin visited Lander due to its similarly to the city of Whiterun from the video game The Elder Scrolls V: Skyrim.
