= List of United States Bureau of Reclamation dams =

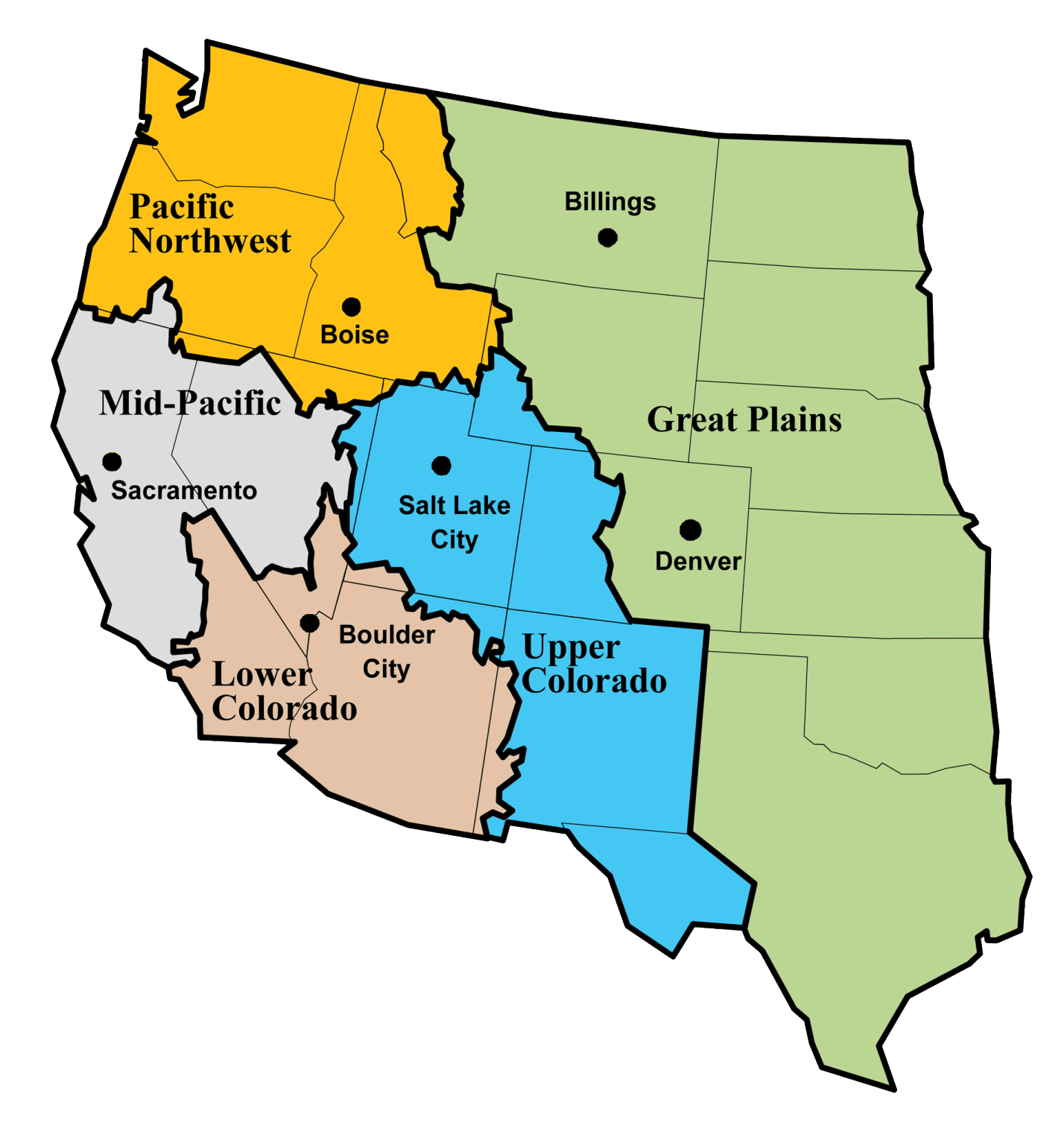
Bureau of Reclamation regions

Following is a complete list of the approximately 340 dams owned by the United States Bureau of Reclamation as of 2008.

The Bureau was established in July 1902 as the "United States Reclamation Service" and was renamed in 1923. The agency has operated in the 17 western states of the continental U.S., divided into five administrative regions. Within the United States Department of the Interior, it oversees water resource management, specifically the oversight and/or operation of numerous diversion, delivery, and storage projects it built throughout the western United States for irrigation, flood control, water supply, and attendant hydroelectric power generation.

Currently USBR is the largest wholesaler of water in the country, bringing water to more than 31 million people, and providing one in five Western farmers with irrigation water for 10 million acres of farmland, which produce 60% of the nation's vegetables and 25% of its fruits and nuts. USBR is also the second-largest producer of hydroelectric power in the western United States.

All major dams are linked below. The National Inventory of Dams defines any "major dam" as being 50 feet (15 m) tall with a storage capacity of at least 5,000 acre-feet (6,200,000 m^{3}), or of any height with a storage capacity of 25,000 acre-feet (31,000,000 m^{3}).

== List of active dams ==
- Agate Dam, Dry Creek, Oregon
- Agency Valley Dam, North Fork Malheur River, Oregon
- Alcova Dam, North Platte River, Wyoming
- Almena Dam, Prairie Dog Creek, Kansas
- Altus Dam, North Fork Red River, Oklahoma
- American Diversion Dam, Rio Grande, New Mexico
- American Falls Dam, Snake River, Idaho
- Anderson Ranch Dam, Boise River, Idaho
- Anderson-Rose Diversion Dam, Lost River, Oregon
- Angostura Dam, Cheyenne River, South Dakota
- Angostura Diversion Dam, Rio Grande, New Mexico
- Anita Dam, Yellowstone River, Montana
- Arbuckle Dam, Rock Creek, Oklahoma
- Arrowrock Dam, Boise River, Idaho
- Arthur R. Bowman Dam, Crooked River, Oregon
- Arthur V. Watkins Dam, Colorado River, Utah
- Avalon Dam, Pecos River, New Mexico
- B. F. Sisk Dam, San Luis Creek, California
- Barretts Diversion Dam, Beaverhead River, Montana
- Bartlett Dam, Verde River, Arizona
- Bartley Diversion Dam, Republican River, Nebraska
- Belle Fourche Dam, Owl Creek, South Dakota
- Belle Fourche Diversion Dam, Owl Creek, South Dakota
- Big Sandy Dam, Big Sandy River, Wyoming
- Black Canyon Diversion Dam, Payette River, Idaho
- Blue Mesa Dam, Gunnison River, Colorado
- Boca Dam, Little Truckee River, California
- Boise River Diversion Dam, Boise River, Idaho
- Bonny Dam, Republican River, Colorado
- Box Butte Dam, Niobrara River, Nebraska
- Boysen Dam, Wind River, Wyoming
- Bradbury Dam, Santa Ynez River, California
- Brantley Dam, Pecos River, New Mexico
- Bretch Diversion Dam, Elk Creek, Oklahoma
- Broadhead Diversion Dam, Provo River, Utah
- Buckhorn Dam, Grass Valley Creek, California
- Buffalo Bill Dam, Shoshone River, Wyoming
- Bull Lake Dam, Bull Lake Creek, Wyoming
- Bully Creek Dam, Bully Creek, Oregon
- Bumping Lake Dam, Bumping River, Washington
- Caballo Dam, Rio Grande, New Mexico
- Cambridge Diversion Dam, Republican River, Nebraska
- Camp Creek Diversion Dam, Camp Creek, California
- Camp Dyer Diversion Dam, Agua Fria River, Arizona
- Canyon Ferry Dam, Missouri River, Montana
- Carpinteria Dam, offstream storage, California
- Carson River Diversion Dam, Carson River, Nevada
- Carter Creek Diversion Dam, Carter Creek, Colorado
- Carter Lake Dam, offstream storage, Colorado
- Cascade Dam, Payette River, Idaho
- Casitas Dam, Coyote Creek, California
- Causey Dam, Ogden River, Utah
- Cedar Bluff Dam, Smoky Hill River, Kansas
- Chapman Diversion Dam, Chapman Gulch, Colorado
- Cheney Dam, Ninnescah River, Kansas
- Choke Canyon Dam, Frio River, Texas
- Clark Canyon Dam, Beaverhead River, Montana
- Cle Elum Dam, Cle Elum River, Washington
- Clear Creek Dam, Tieton River, Washington
- Clear Lake Dam, Lost River, California
- Cold Springs Dam, offstream storage, Oregon
- Como Dam, Rock Creek, Montana
- Conconully Dam, Salmon Creek, Washington
- Contra Loma Dam, offstream storage, California
- Corbett Diversion Dam, Shoshone River, Wyoming
- Crane Prairie Dam, Deschutes River, Oregon
- Crawford Dam, Iron Creek, Colorado
- Crystal Dam, Gunnison River, Colorado
- Culbertson Diversion Dam, Frenchman Creek, Nebraska
- Currant Creek Dam, Currant Creek, Utah
- Davis Creek Dam, Davis Creek, Nebraska
- Davis Dam, Colorado River, Arizona and Nevada
- Deadwood Dam, Deadwood River, Idaho
- Deaver Dam, offstream storage, Wyoming
- Deer Creek Dam and Reservoir, Provo River, Utah
- Deer Flat East Dike Dam, offstream storage, Idaho
- Deer Flat Lower Embankment, offstream storage, Idaho
- Deer Flat Middle Embankment, offstream storage, Idaho
- Deer Flat Upper Embankment, offstream storage, Idaho
- Deerfield Dam, Castle Creek, South Dakota
- Derby Diversion Dam, Truckee River, Nevada
- Dickinson Dam, Heart River, North Dakota
- Dille Diversion Dam, Big Thompson River, Colorado
- Dixon Canyon Dam, offstream storage, Colorado
- Dodson Diversion Dam, Milk River, Montana
- Dressler Diversion Dam, Nevada
- Dry Creek Diversion Dam, Dry Creek, Colorado
- Dry Falls Dam, Grand Coulee, Washington
- Dry Spotted Tail Diversion Dam, Dry Spotted Tail Creek, Nebraska
- Dunlap Diversion Dam, Niobrara River, Nebraska
- East Canyon Dam, Colorado River, Utah
- East Park Dam, Little Stony Creek, California
- East Portal Diversion Dam, Wind River, Colorado
- Easton Diversion Dam, Yakima River, Washington
- Echo Dam, Weber Basin, Utah
- Eden Dam, Little Sandy Creek, Wyoming
- El Vado Dam, Rio Chama, New Mexico
- Elephant Butte Dam, Rio Grande, New Mexico
- Emigrant Dam, Emigrant Creek, Oregon
- Enders Dam, Frenchman Creek, Nebraska
- Fish Lake Dam, Little Butte Creek, Oregon
- Flaming Gorge Dam, Green River, Utah
- Flatiron Afterbay Dam, Chimney Hollow Creek, Colorado
- Folsom Dam, American River, California
- Fontenelle Dam, Green River, Wyoming
- Fort Cobb Dam, Cobb Creek, Oklahoma
- Fort Shaw Diversion Dam and Canal, Sun River, Montana
- Foss Dam, Washita River, Oklahoma
- French Canyon Dam, Cowiche Creek, Washington
- Fresno Dam, Milk River, Montana
- Friant Dam, San Joaquin River, California
- Fruitgrowers Dam, Alfalfa Run, Colorado
- Fryingpan Diversion Dam, Fryingpan River, Colorado
- Funks Dam, Funks Creek, California
- Garnet Diversion Dam, Uncompahgre River, Colorado
- Gerber Dam, Miller Creek, Oregon
- Gibson Dam, Sun River, Montana
- Glen Annie Dam, Glen Annie Canyon, California
- Glen Canyon Dam, Colorado River, Arizona
- Glen Elder Dam, Solomon River, Kansas
- Glendo Dam, North Platte River, Wyoming
- Granby Dam, Colorado River, Colorado
- Grand Coulee Dam, Columbia River, Washington
- Granite Creek Diversion Dam, Colorado
- Granite Reef Diversion Dam, Salt River, Arizona
- Grassy Lake Dam, Grassy Creek, Wyoming
- Gray Reef Dam, North Platte River, Wyoming
- Green Mountain Dam, Blue River, Colorado
- Guernsey Dam, North Platte River, Wyoming
- Halfmoon Diversion Dam, Halfmoon Creek, Colorado
- Hanover Diversion Dam, Bighorn River, Wyoming
- Haystack Dam, offstream storage, Oregon
- Heart Butte Dam, Heart River, North Dakota
- Helena Valley Dam, Tenmile Creek, Montana
- Heron Dam, Colorado River, New Mexico
- Hoover Dam, Colorado River, Nevada and Arizona
- Horse Creek Diversion Dam, Horse Creek, Wyoming
- Horse Mesa Dam, Salt River, Arizona
- Horseshoe Dam, Verde River, Arizona
- Horsetooth Dam, (offstream storage), Colorado
- Howard Prairie Dam, Little Butte Creek, Oregon
- Hubbard Dam, offstream storage, Idaho
- Hungry Horse Dam, South Fork Flathead River, Montana
- Hunter Creek Diversion Dam, Hunter Creek, Colorado
- Huntington North Dam, Huntington Creek, Utah
- Hyatt Dam, Keene Creek, Oregon
- Hyrum Dam, Little Bear Water, Utah
- Imperial Dam, Colorado River, California and Arizona
- Island Park Dam, Henrys Fork (Snake River), Idaho
- Isleta Diversion Dam, Rio Grande, New Mexico
- Ivanhoe Diversion Dam, Ivanhoe Creek, Colorado
- Jackson Gulch Dam, offstream storage, Colorado
- Jackson Lake Dam, Snake River, Wyoming
- James Diversion Dam, James River, South Dakota
- Jamestown Dam, James River, North Dakota
- Joes Valley Dam, Seely Creek, Utah
- John Franchi Diversion Dam, Fresno River, California
- Jordanelle Dam, Provo River, Utah
- Kachess Dam, Kachess River, Washington
- Keechelus Dam, Yakima River, Washington
- Keene Creek Dam, Keene Creek, Oregon
- Kent Diversion Dam, North Loup, Nebraska
- Keswick Dam, Sacramento River, California
- Keyhole Dam, offstream storage, Wyoming
- Kirwin Dam, Solomon River, Kansas
- Kortes Dam, North Platte River, Wyoming
- Laguna Diversion Dam, Colorado River, Arizona and California
- Lahontan Dam, Carson River, Nevada
- Lake Alice No 1 Dam, offstream equalizing reservoir, Nebraska
- Lake Alice No 1 and 1 Half, offstream equalizing reservoir, Nebraska
- Lake Alice No 2 Dam, offstream equalizing reservoir, Nebraska
- Lake Sherburne Dam, Swiftcurrent Creek, Montana
- Lake Tahoe Dam, Truckee River, California
- Lauro Dam, Diablo Creek, California
- Lemon Dam, Florida River, Colorado
- Lewiston Dam, Trinity River, California
- Lily Pad Diversion Inlet Dam, Ivanhoe Creek, Colorado
- Link River Dam, Link River, Oregon
- Little Hell Creek Diversion Dam, Little Hell Creek, Colorado
- Little Panoche Detention Dam, Little Panoche Creek, California
- Little Wood Dam, Little Wood River, Idaho
- Los Banos Creek Detention Dam, Los Baños Creek, California
- Lost Creek Dam, Lost Creek, Utah
- Lost River Diversion Dam, Lost River, Oregon
- Lovewell Dam, White Rock Creek, Kansas
- Lower Yellowstone Diversion Dam, Yellowstone River, Montana
- Malone Diversion Dam, Lost River, Oregon
- Mann Creek Dam, Mann Creek, Idaho
- Marble Bluff Dam, Little Truckee River, Nevada
- Martinez Dam, offstream storage, California
- Marys Lake Dike Dam, offstream storage, Colorado
- Mason Dam, Powder River, Oregon
- McGee Creek Dam, McGee Creek, Oklahoma
- McKay Dam, McKay Creek, Oregon
- McPhee Dam, Dolores River, Colorado
- Medicine Creek Dam, Medicine Creek, Nebraska
- Meeks Cabin Dam, Blacks Fork, Wyoming
- Merritt Dam, Snake River, Nebraska
- Middle Cunningham Creek Diversion Dam, Cunningham Creek, Colorado
- Midview Dam, offstream storage, Utah
- Midway Creek Diversion Dam, Midway Creek, Colorado
- Milburn Diversion Dam, Middle Loup, Nebraska
- Miller Diversion Dam, Miller Creek, Oregon
- Minatare Dam, offstream equalizing reservoir, Nebraska
- Minidoka Dam, Snake River, Idaho
- Monticello Dam, Putah Creek, California
- Moon Lake Dam, Lake Fork River, Utah
- Mormon Creek Diversion Dam, Mormon Creek, Colorado
- Mormon Flat Dam, Salt River, Arizona
- Mormon Island Auxiliary Dam, Blue Ravine, California
- Morrow Point Dam, Gunnison River, Colorado
- Mountain Park Dam, West Otter Creek, Oklahoma
- Mt Elbert Forebay Dam, offstream storage, Colorado
- Nambe Falls Dam, Colorado River, New Mexico
- Navajo Dam, San Juan River, New Mexico
- Nelson Dam, offstream storage, Montana
- New Melones Dam, Stanislaus River, California
- New Waddell Dam, Agua Fria River, Arizona
- Newton Dam, Colorado River, Utah
- Nimbus Dam, American River, California
- No Name Creek Diversion Dam, No Name Creek, Colorado
- Norman Dam, Little River, Oklahoma
- North Cunningham Creek Diversion Dam, Cunningham Creek, Colorado
- North Dam, Grand Coulee, Washington
- North Fork Diversion Dam, North Fork Creek, Colorado
- North Poudre Diversion Dam, Colorado
- Northside Diversion Dam, Stony Creek, California
- Norton Dam, Prairie Dog Creek, Kansas
- O'Neill Dam, San Luis Creek, California
- O'Sullivan Dam, Crab Creek, Washington
- Ochoco Dam, Ochoco Creek, Oregon
- Olympus Dam, Big Thompson River, Colorado
- Ortega Dam, offstream storage, California
- Owyhee Dam, Owyhee River, Oregon
- Pactola Dam, Rapid Creek, South Dakota
- Palisades Dam, Snake River, Idaho
- Palo Verde Diversion Dam, Colorado River, Arizona and California
- Paonia Dam, Muddy Creek, Colorado
- Paradise Diversion Dam, Milk River, Montana
- Parker Dam, Colorado River, Arizona and California
- Pathfinder Dam, North Platte River, Wyoming
- Pathfinder Dike Dam, North Platte River, Wyoming
- Pilot Butte Dam, offstream storage, Wyoming
- Pineview Dam, Ogden River, Utah
- Pinto Dam, offstream storage, Washington
- Pishkun Dikes, offstream storage, Montana
- Platoro Dam, Conejos River, Colorado
- Pole Hill Creek Diversion Dam, Little Hell Creek, Colorado
- Prosser Creek Dam, Prosser Creek, California
- Pueblo Dam, Arkansas River, Colorado
- Putah Dam, Putah Creek, California
- Rainbow Diversion Dam, Stony Creek, California
- Ralston Dam, Garland Canal, Wyoming
- Rattlesnake Dam, Rattlesnake Creek, Colorado
- Red Bluff Diversion Dam, Sacramento River, California
- Red Fleet Dam, Big Bush Creek, Utah
- Red Willow Creek Diversion Dam, Red Willow Creek, Nebraska
- Red Willow Dam, Red Willow Creek, Nebraska
- Reservoir A Dam, offstream storage, Idaho
- Ridgway Dam, Uncompahgre River, Colorado
- Rifle Gap Dam, Rifle Creek, Colorado
- Ririe Dam, Snake River, Idaho
- Robles Diversion Dam, seasonal conduit, California
- Roza Diversion Dam, Yakima River, Washington
- Ruedi Dam, Fryingpan River, Colorado
- Rye Patch Dam, Humboldt River, Nevada
- Salmon Lake Dam, offstream storage, Washington
- San Acacia Diversion Dam, Rio Grande, New Mexico
- San Justo Dam, offstream storage, California
- Sanford Dam, Canadian River, Texas
- Santanka Dike Dam, offstream storage, Colorado
- Sawyer Diversion Dam, Sawyer Creek, Colorado
- Scofield Dam, Price River, Utah
- Scoggins Dam, Scoggins Creek, Oregon
- Seminoe Dam, North Platte River, Wyoming
- Senator Wash Dam, offstream storage, California
- Shadehill Dam, Grand River, South Dakota
- Shadow Mountain Dam, Colorado River, Colorado
- Shasta Dam, Sacramento River, California
- Silver Jack Dam, Cimarron Creek, Colorado
- Sly Park Dam, Sly Park Creek, California
- Soldier Canyon Dam, offstream storage, Colorado
- Soldier Creek Dam, Strawberry River, Utah
- Soldiers Meadow Dam, Webb Creek, Idaho
- South Cunningham Creek Diversion Dam, Cunningham Creek, Colorado
- South Fork Diversion Dam, Colorado
- South Platte Supply Canal Diversion Dam, Boulder Creek, Colorado
- Spring Canyon Dam, offstream storage, Colorado
- Spring Creek Debris Dam, Spring Creek, California
- St. Mary Diversion Dam, St. Mary River, Montana
- Stampede Dam, Little Truckee River, California
- Starvation Dam, Strawberry River, Utah
- Stateline Dam, East Fork of Smiths Fork, Utah
- Steinaker Dam, Ashley Creek, Utah
- Stewart Mountain Dam, Salt River, Arizona
- Stony Gorge Dam, Stony Creek, California
- Sugar Loaf Dam, Arkansas River, Colorado
- Sumner Dam, Pecos River, New Mexico
- Sun River Diversion Dam, Sun River, Montana
- Superior Courtland Diversion Dam, Republican River, Nebraska
- Swift Current Dike, Swiftcurrent Creek, Montana
- Taylor Park Dam, Taylor River, Colorado
- Terminal Dam, offstream storage, California
- Theodore Roosevelt Dam, Salt River, Arizona
- Thief Valley Dam, Powder River, Oregon
- Three Mile Falls Diversion Dam, Umatilla River, Oregon
- Tiber Dam, Marias River, Montana
- Tieton Dam, Tieton River, Washington
- Trenton Dam, Republican River, Nebraska
- Trinity Dam, Trinity River, California
- Tub Springs Creek Diversion Dam, Tub Springs Creek, Nebraska
- Twin Buttes Dam, Spring Creek, Texas
- Twin Lakes Dam, Lake Creek, Colorado
- Twitchell Dam, Cuyama River, California
- Unity Dam, Burnt River, Oregon
- Upper Slaven Diversion Dam, Humboldt River, Nevada
- Upper Stillwater Dam, Colorado River, Utah
- Vallecito Dam, Pine River, Colorado
- Vandalia Diversion Dam, Milk River, Montana
- Vega Dam, Plateau Creek, Colorado
- Virginia Smith Dam, Calamus River, Nebraska
- Wanship Dam, Weber River, Utah
- Warm Springs Dam, Malheur River, Oregon
- Wasco Dam, Clear Creek, Oregon
- Webster Dam, Solomon River, Kansas
- Whalen Diversion Dam, North Platte River, Wyoming
- Whiskeytown Dam, Clear Creek, California
- Wickiup Dam, Deschutes River, Oregon
- Willow Creek Dam, Willow Creek, Colorado
- Willow Creek Dam, Willow Creek, Montana
- Willwood Diversion Dam, Shoshone River, Wyoming
- Wind River Diversion Dam, Wind River, Wyoming
- Woodston Diversion Dam, Solomon River, Kansas
- Yellowstone River Diversion Dam, Yellowstone River, Montana
- Yellowtail Afterbay Dam, Bighorn River, Montana
- Yellowtail Dam, Bighorn River, Montana

== Others ==
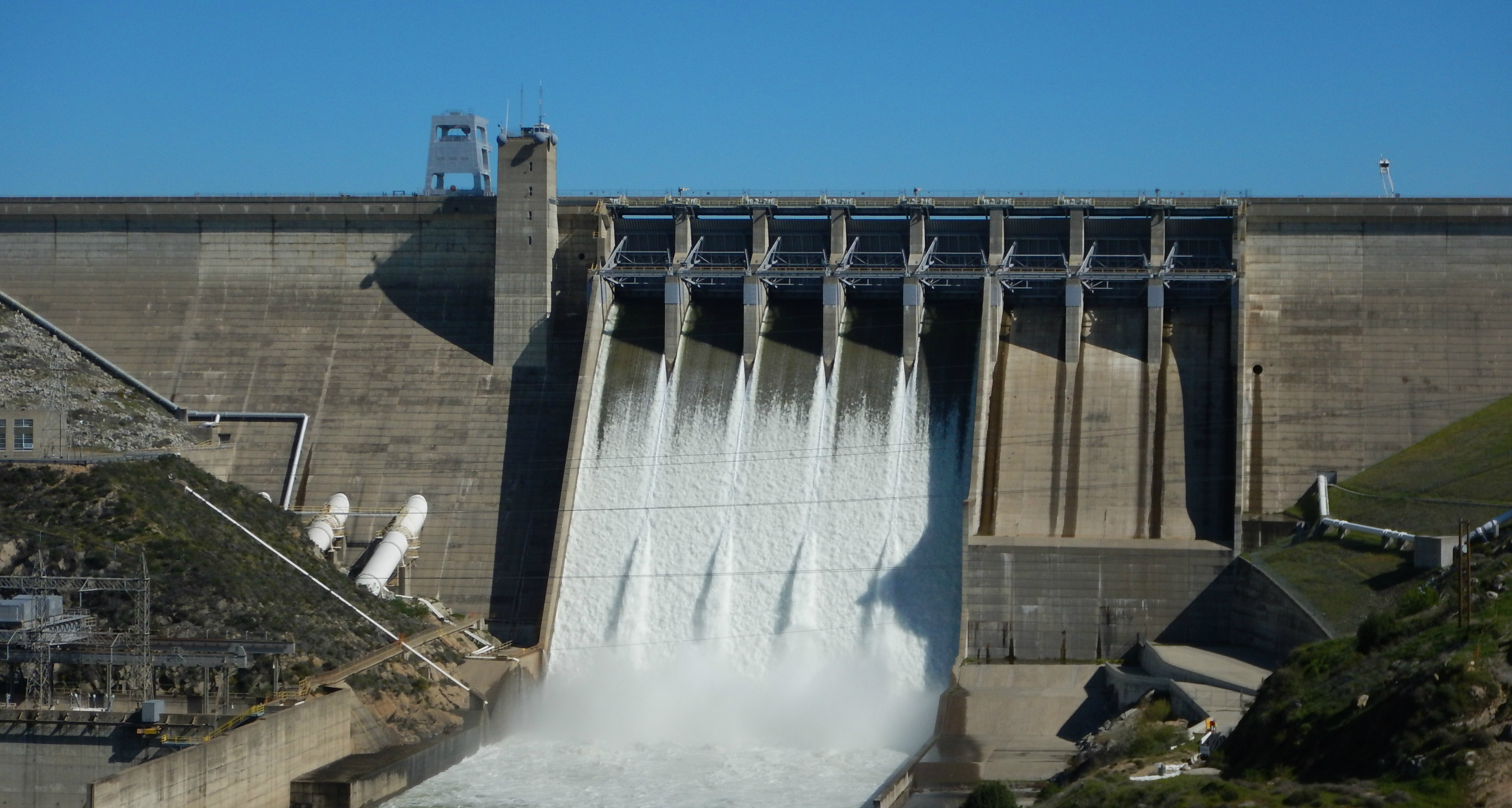
Folsom Dam, American River, California

- Anchor Dam, South Fork Owl Creek, Wyoming (unfillable)
- Teton Dam, Teton River, Idaho (failed)
- Mansfield Dam, Colorado River (Texas), Texas (partially owned)
- Grand Valley Diversion Dam, Colorado River, Colorado (transferred out)

=== Proposed ===
These projects have been abandoned, with the exception of the Temperance Flat Dam.

- Ah Pah Dam
- Auburn Dam
- Bridge Canyon Dam
- Echo Park Dam
- Hooker Dam
- Marble Canyon Dam
- Temperance Flat Dam
