= List of dams and reservoirs in Wyoming =

Following is a list of dams and reservoirs in Wyoming.

All major dams are linked below. The National Inventory of Dams defines any "major dam" as being 50 feet (15 m) tall with a storage capacity of at least 5,000 acre-feet (6,200,000 m^{3}), or of any height with a storage capacity of 25,000 acre-feet (31,000,000 m^{3}).

== List ==
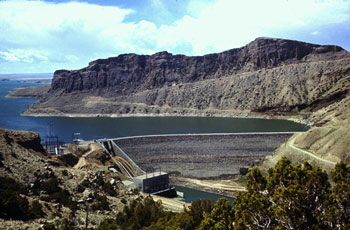
Boysen Dam

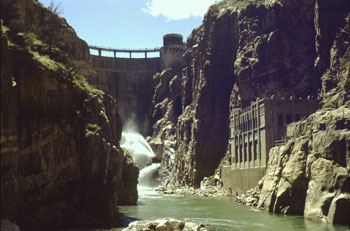
Buffalo Bill Dam

- Alcova Dam, Alcova Reservoir, United States Bureau of Reclamation
- Anchor Dam, Anchor Reservoir, USBR
- Big Sandy Dam, Big Sandy Reservoir, USBR
- Boysen Dam, Boysen Reservoir
- Buffalo Bill Dam (formerly Shoshone Dam), Buffalo Bill Reservoir, USBR
- Bull Lake Dam, Bull Lake Reservoir, USBR
- Flaming Gorge Dam, Flaming Gorge Reservoir, USBR
- Fontenelle Dam, Fontenelle Reservoir, USBR
- Glendo Dam, Glendo Reservoir, USBR
- Granite Springs Dam, Granite Springs Reservoir, City of Cheyenne
- Grassy Lake Dam, Grassy Lake Reservoir, USBR
- Guernsey Dam, Guernsey Reservoir, USBR
- Jackson Lake Dam, Jackson Lake, USBR
- Keyhole Dam, Keyhole Reservoir, USBR
- Kortes Dam, Kortes Reservoir, USBR
- Meeks Cabin Dam, Meeks Cabin Reservoir, USBR
- Worthen Meadow Reservoir, City of Lander
- Pathfinder Dam, Pathfinder Reservoir, USBR
- Pilot Butte Dam, Pilot Butte Reservoir, USBR
- Seminoe Dam, Seminoe Reservoir, USBR

== See also ==
- List of largest reservoirs of Wyoming
- List of dam removals in Wyoming
- List of lakes in Wyoming
- List of rivers in Wyoming
