= List of power stations in Wyoming =

Sources of Wyoming electricity generation in gigawatt-hours, full-year 2025:
1. Coal: 27,024 (58.5%)
2. Wind: 12,526 (27.1%)
3. Natural gas: 4,595 (9.94%)
4. Hydroelectric: 1,082 (2.34%)
5. Solar: 496 (1.07%)
6. Other gases: 365 (0.79%)
7. Petroleum: 53 (0.11%)
8. Other: 85 (0.18%)

This is a list of electricity-generating power stations in the U.S. state of Wyoming, sorted by type and name. In 2024, Wyoming had a total summer capacity of 10.8 GW through all of its power plants, and a net generation of 40,709 GWh. The electrical energy generation mix in 2025 was 58.5% coal, 27.1% wind, 9.9% natural gas, 2.3% hydroelectric, 1.1% solar, 0.8% other gases, 0.1% petroleum, and 0.2% other. Small-scale solar, which includes customer-owned photovoltaic panels, delivered 41 GWh to Wyoming's electrical grid in 2025.

Wyoming has the smallest population in the U.S., and in 2019 three-fifths of its electricity generation was sent to nearby western states. It contains more than one-third of the nation's recoverable coal reserves, accounted for two-fifths of all related U.S. mining activity, and exported much of its low-sulfur coal to power plants in 29 other states. Wyoming also mined and exported nearly all the uranium used to fuel the nation's fleet of nuclear power stations. These activities have declined somewhat in recent years, while extraction of Wyoming's oil and gas reserves continued to expand.

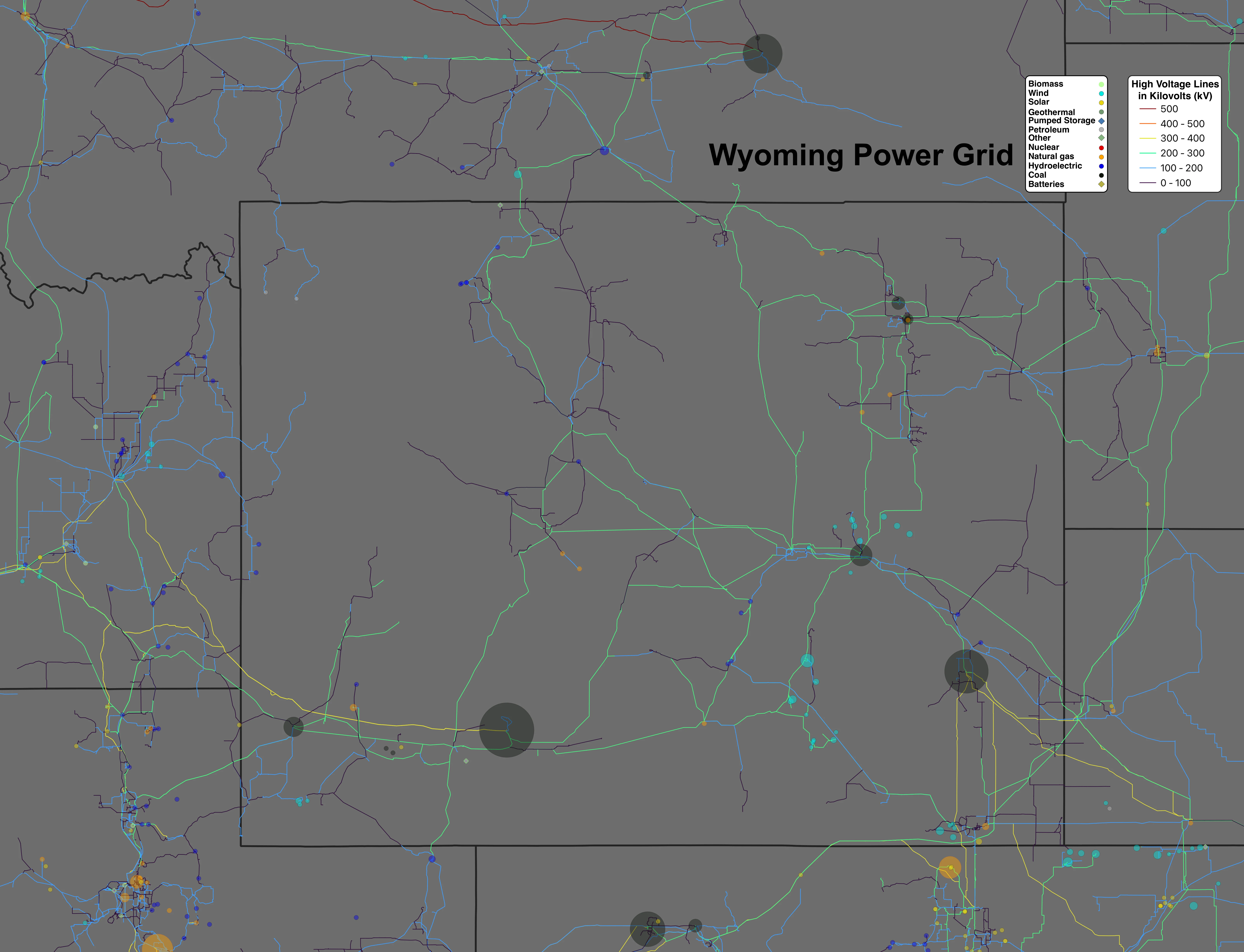
Wyoming power grid

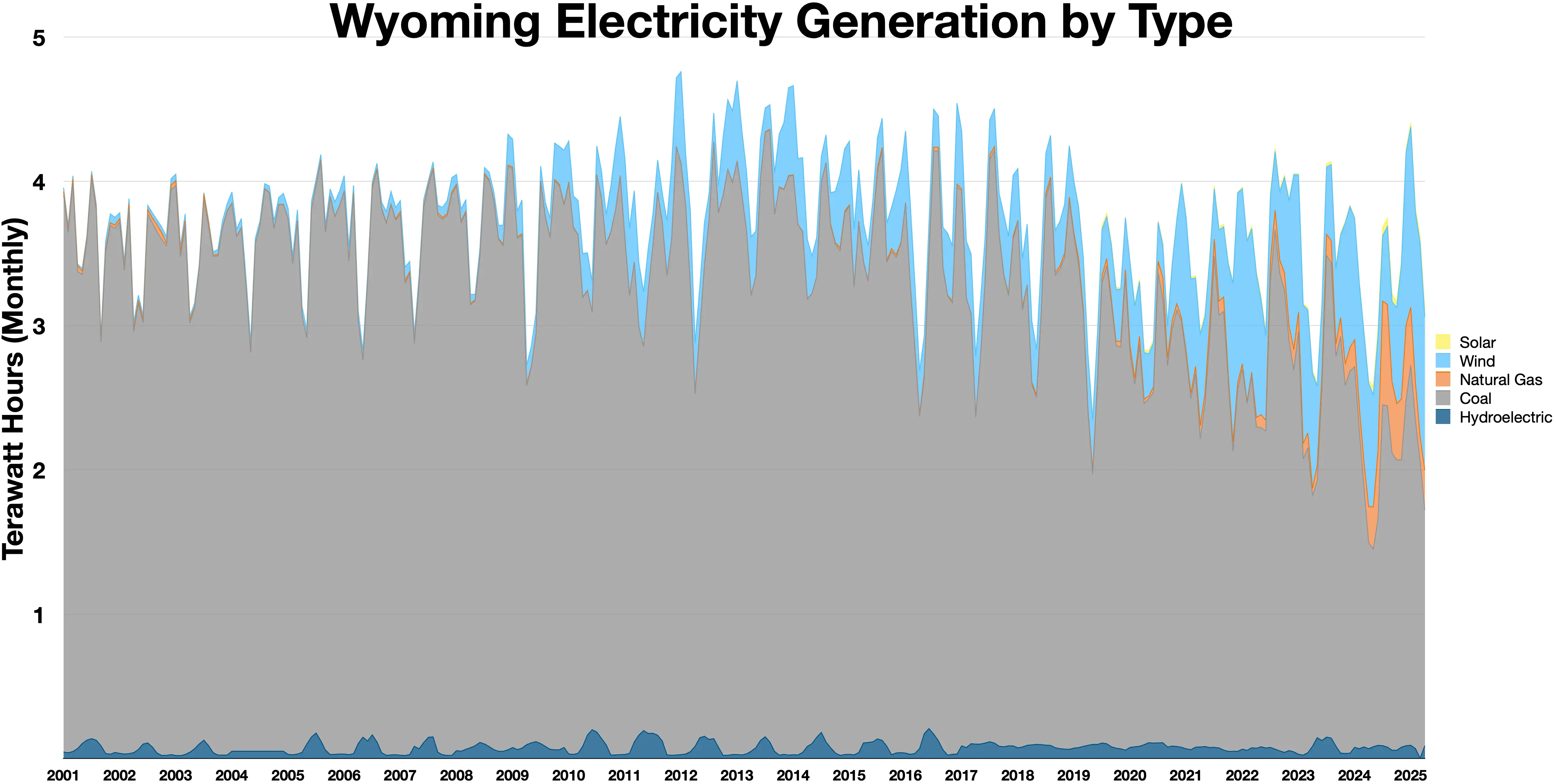
Wyoming electricity generation by type

== Nuclear power stations ==
Wyoming has no utility-scale nuclear facilities. In June 2021, Terrapower and Pacificorp announced their intention to advance a novel reactor demonstration project at the site of a retiring coal plant in Wyoming. On 16 November 2021, Pacificorp announced the selection of the Naughton Power Plant in Kemmerer, Wyoming, for the Natrium Demonstration Project.

== Fossil-fuel power stations ==
Data from the U.S. Energy Information Administration serves as a general reference.

=== Coal ===
Name	Location	Coordinates	Capacity (MW)	Number of steam turbine units	Year completed	Retirement schedule	Refs
Dave Johnston	Converse County	42.8378°N 105.7769°W	922.2	4	1957 (Unit 1); 1961 (Unit 2); 1964 (Unit 3); 1972 (Unit 4)	2027	
General Chemical	Sweetwater County	41.5933°N 109.7542°W	30	2	1968 (Unit 1); 1977 (Unit 2)		
Genesis Alkali	Sweetwater County	41.6217°N 109.8119°W	41	6	1953-1975		
Jim Bridger Power Station	Sweetwater County	41.7378°N 108.7857°W	2,441.9	4	1974 (Unit 1); 1975 (Unit 2); 1976 (Unit 3); 1979 (Unit 4)	2038 (Unit 1); 2038 (Unit 2); 2023 (Unit 3); 2028 (Unit 4)	
Laramie River Station	Platte County	42.1089°N 104.8825°W	1,710	3	1981 (Unit 1); 1981 (Unit 2); 1982 (Unit 3)		
Naughton Power Plant	Lincoln County	41.7581°N 110.5983°W	832	3	1963 (Unit 1); 1968 (Unit 2); 1971 (Unit 3)	2025 (Unit 1); 2025 (Unit 2); 2019 (unit 3)	
Neil Simpson I	Campbell County	44.2872°N 105.3878°W	22	1	1959	2014 (closed)	
Neil Simpson II	Campbell County	44.2857°N 105.3833°W	80	1	1995		
Wygen I	Campbell County	44.2858°N 105.3833°W	90	1	2003		
Wygen II	Campbell County	44.2919°N 105.3811°W	95	1	2008		
Wygen III	Campbell County	44.2919°N 105.3806°W	116	1	2010		
Wyodak	Campbell County	44.2901°N 105.3815°W	402.3	1	1978	2038	

=== Natural gas ===
Name	Location	Coordinates	Capacity (MW)	Generation type	Year completed	Refs
Arvada	Sheridan County	44.6900°N 106.1092°W	22.5	Simple cycle (x3)	2002	
Barber Creek	Campbell County	43.7219°N 105.7689°W	22.5	Simple cycle (x3)	2002	
Beaver Creek Gas Plant	Fremont County	42.8475°N 108.3136°W	3.6	Simple cycle (x2)	1983	
Big Sand Draw Plant	Fremont County	42.7527°N 108.1697°W	8.0	Reciprocating engine (x5)	2015	
Cheyenne Prairie Generating Station	Laramie County	41.1236°N 107.7200°W	140	2x1 combined cycle, simple cycle	2014	
Hartzog	Campbell County	43.8294°N 105.5322°W	22.5	Simple cycle (x3)	2002	
Neil Simpson	Campbell County	44.2850°N 105.3786°W	68	Simple cycle (x2)	2000/2001	
Sinclair Oil Refinery	Carbon County	41.7795°N 107.1097°W	3.9	Reciprocating engine (x3)	2012	
Western Sugar Cooperative - Torrington	Goshen County	42.0469°N 104.1863°W	2.0	Steam turbine	1923; 2018 (closed)	

=== Other petroleum gases ===
Name	Location	Coordinates	Capacity (MW)	Fuel type	Generation type	Year completed	Refs
Beaver Creek Gas Plant	Fremont County	42.8475°N 108.3136°W	0.9	All other	Steam turbine	2018	
Elk Basin Gasoline Plant	Park County	44.9806°N 108.8428°W	2.0	Other gases	Steam turbine (x2)	1948	
Shute Creek Facility	Lincoln County	41.8805°N 110.0904°W	144	Other gases	Simple cycle (x3)	2005	
Sinclair Oil Refinery	Carbon County	41.7795°N 107.1097°W	1.7	Other gases	Steam turbine (x2)	1926/1954	

=== Petroleum liquids ===
Name	Location	Coordinates	Capacity (MW)	Generation type	Year completed	Refs
Lake	Teton County	44.4150°N 110.5739°W	2.7	Reciprocating engine	1967	
Old Faithful	Teton County	44.4533°N 110.8347°W	2.0	Reciprocating engine (x2)	1979	
Sinclair Oil Refinery	Carbon County	41.7795°N 107.1097°W	1.1	Reciprocating engine	1955	

== Renewable power stations ==
Data from the U.S. Energy Information Administration serves as a general reference.

=== Biomass and industrial waste ===
Name	Location	Coordinates	Capacity (MW)	Fuel type	Generation type	Year completed	Refs
Simplot Phosphates	Sweetwater County	41.5417°N 109.1328°W	11.5	Industrial waste heat^{[A]}	Steam turbine	1986	

^{A} Waste heat from phosphate fertilizer manufacturing

=== Geothermal ===
Wyoming has no utility-scale geothermal facilities. It has a number of small-scale geothermal installations used mostly to heat buildings.

=== Hydroelectric ===
Name	Location	Coordinates	Capacity (MW)	Number of turbines	Year completed	Refs
Alcova	Natrona County	42.5484°N 106.7075°W	41.4	2	1955	
Boysen	Fremont County	43.4179°N 108.1775°W	15	2	1952	
Buffalo Bill	Park County	44.5082°N 109.1707°W	18	3	1992	
Fontenelle	Lincoln County	42.0270°N 110.0640°W	10	1	1968	
Fremont Canyon	Natrona County	42.4766°N 106.7959°W	66.8	2	1960/1961	
Garland Canal	Park County	44.7264°N 108.8644°W	2.9	1	1983	
Glendo	Platte County	42.4673°N 104.9555°W	38	2	1958/1959	
Guernsey	Platte County	42.2899°N 104.7606°W	6.4	2	1927/1928	
Heart Mountain	Park County	44.5138°N 109.1296°W	5.0	1	1948	
Kortes	Carbon County	42.1743°N 106.8805°W	36	3	1950/1951	
Pilot Butte	Fremont County	43.2190°N 108.7877°W	1.6	2	1925/1929	
Salt River	Carbon County	43.1195°N 111.0352°W	0.6	2	1936; 1967 (closed)	
Seminoe	Carbon County	42.1561°N 106.9085°W	51.6	3	1939	
Shoshone (WY)	Park County	44.5029°N 109.1812°W	3.0	1	1922	
Spirit Mountain	Park County	44.5127°N 109.1299°W	4.5	1	1994	
Strawberry Creek	Lincoln County	42.9051°N 110.8934°W	1.5	3	1940/1951	
Swift Creek	Lincoln County	42.7284°N 110.9166°W	1.7	3	2009/2010	

=== Solar ===
Plant	Location	Coordinates	Capacity (MW_{AC})	Year completed	Refs
South Cheyenne Solar	Laramie County		150	2024	
Sweetwater Solar	Sweetwater County	41.6291°N 109.6835°W	92	2018	

=== Wind ===
Additional data reported by the United States Wind Turbine Database
Plant	Location	Coordinates	Capacity (MW)	Number of turbines	Year completed	Refs
Campbell Hill Windpower	Converse County	43.0146°N 105.9990°W	99	66	2009	
Casper Wind Farm	Natrona County	42.8847°N 106.2214°W	16.5	11	2009	
Cedar Springs Wind Farm (I-III)	Converse County	42.9850°N 105.4325°W	531.56	192	2020	
Corriedale Wind Energy Project	Laramie County	41.0992°N 104.9757°W	59.22	21	2020	
Dunlap	Carbon County	42.0436°N 106.1603°W	136.9	74	2010	
Ekola Flats	Carbon County	41.9360°N 106.3122°W	250.9	63	2020	
Foote Creek I	Carbon County	41.6283°N 106.2013°W	41.4	69	1999	
Foote Creek II, III, IV Repowering	Carbon County	41.6699°N 106.1839°W	46.2	11	2023	
Glenrock	Converse County	43.0181°N 105.8353°W	119.3	66	2008	
Happy Jack Windpower Project	Laramie County	41.1397°N 104.9978°W	29.4	14	2008	
High Plains	Albany County	41.6751°N 106.0111°W	122.1	66	2009	
McFadden Ridge	Albany County	41.6559°N 106.0375°W	35.15	19	2009	
Medicine Bow	Carbon County	41.8353°N 106.2431°W	3.55	5	2015	
Mountain Wind Power II	Uinta County	41.2639°N 110.5444°W	79.8	38	2008	
Mountain Wind Power LLC	Uinta County	41.2881°N 110.5030°W	60.9	29	2008	
Pioneer Wind Park, LLC	Converse County	42.7282°N 105.8668°W	80.0	46	2016	
Rolling Hills Wind Farm	Converse County	43.0572°N 105.8543°W	115.8	66	2009	
Roundhouse Wind Energy Center	Laramie County	41.0660°N 105.1230°W	226.56	82	2020	
Seven Mile Hill	Carbon County	41.9469°N 106.3936°W	122.1	66	2008	
Silver Sage Windpower	Laramie County	41.1297°N 105.0240°W	42.0	20	2009	
TB Flats I and II	Carbon County	42.1296°N 106.1251°W	301.1	85	2021	
Top of the World Windpower Project	Converse County	42.9517°N 105.7727°W	200.2	110	2010	
TransAlta Wyoming Wind	Uinta County	41.2874°N 110.5556°W	144.0	80	2003	

The Chokecherry and Sierra Madre Wind Energy Project, with a planned capacity of up to 3,000 MW generated by about 1,000 turbines, is under construction in Carbon County and scheduled for completion in 2026. It would be the largest wind farm in the U.S. upon completion, and would serve the western U.S. market through planned new HVDC transmission capacity.

== Battery storage facilities ==
Wyoming had no utility-scale battery storage facilities in 2019.

== See also ==
- List of power stations in the United States
