= Parting of the Ways =

Parting of the ways refers to the split between Judaism and Christianity.

(The) Parting of the Ways may also refer to:

- Parting of the Ways (Wyoming), a historic site
- The Parting of the Ways, a Doctor Who episode
- The Parting of the Ways (Casualty), a webisode
