= List of dam removals in Wyoming =

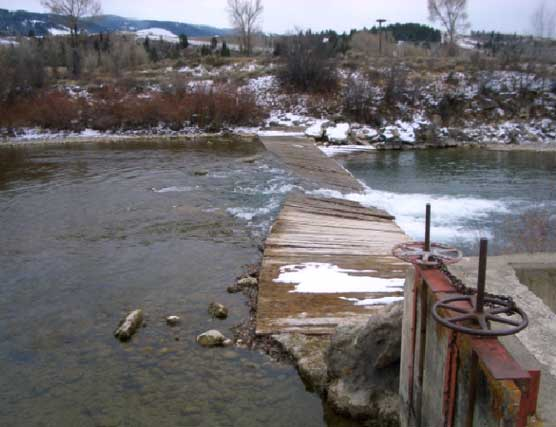
The Newbold Diversion Dam on the Gros Ventre River prior to its removal in 2013.

This is a list of dams in Wyoming that have been removed as physical impediments to free-flowing rivers or streams.

== Removals by watershed ==
=== Gros Ventre River ===
Located on the border of Grand Teton National Park and the National Elk Refuge, the failing Newbold Diversion Dam on the Gros Ventre River was no longer used for irrigation and had become a safety risk. The dam's removal opened up more than 100 miles (160 km) of stream to fish spawning on a tributary of the Snake River.

== Completed removals ==
Dam	Height	Year removed	Location	Watercourse	Watershed
White Water Barrier Dam		2012	Lincoln County; 42.0976°N 110.9357°W	Smiths Fork	Bear River
Twin Creek Barrier and Screen Dam		2012	Lincoln County; 41.8227°N 110.9025°W	Twin Creek	Bear River
Newbold Diversion Dam	2 ft (0.61 m) (est.)	2013	Kelly; 43.62°N 110.625°W	Gros Ventre River	Gros Ventre River
Jones Creek Dam		2018	Teton County; 43.4633°N 110.1772°W	Gros Ventre River	Gros Ventre River
Unnamed dam		2018	Teton County; 43.467°N 110.1886°W	Lafferty Creek	Gros Ventre River
Lloyd Creek Dam		2018	Teton County; 43.4706°N 110.1974°W	Lloyd Creek	Gros Ventre River
Unnamed dam		2018	Teton County; 43.4769°N 110.2081°W	Lloyd Creek	Gros Ventre River
Hoback River Dam		2019	Bondurant; 43.1402°N 110.3829°W	Hoback River	Hoback River
Little Snake River Barrier Dam #1		2014	Carbon County; 41.0386°N 107.6279°W	Little Snake River	Little Snake River
Savery Creek Barrier Dam #1		2015	Carbon County; 41.037°N 107.427°W	Savery Creek	Little Snake River
Savery Creek Barrier Dam #2		2015	Carbon County; 41.0321°N 107.4355°W	Savery Creek	Little Snake River
Savery Creek Brewster-Clay Dam		2019	Carbon County; 41.0851°N 107.386°W	Savery Creek	Little Snake River
Muddy Creek Barrier Dam		2014	Carbon County; 41.4873°N 107.5465°W	Muddy Creek	Snake River
White Grass Dude Ranch Dam		1988	Teton County; 43.6541°N 110.7711°W	Tributary to Snake River	Snake River
Spread Creek Dam		2011	Moose; 43.7884°N 110.474°W	Spread Creek	Snake River

== See also ==
- List of dam removals in Colorado
- List of dam removals in Idaho
