= List of largest reservoirs in Wyoming =

The following is a list of the fourteen reservoirs, in the United States state of Wyoming, that contain at least 40,000 acre-feet (49 million cubic meters) when at full capacity. In addition to in-stream reservoirs, the list includes enhanced natural lakes, notably Jackson Lake. With five of the fourteen largest reservoirs in the state, the North Platte River is the most dammed river in the state, and provides much of the state's water storage.

These reservoirs provide 10,221,672 acre-feet (13 billion cubic metres) of storage. (Some of this storage capacity, or of the water held in it, is allocated otherwise than for normal use within the state.)

Key
† denotes reservoir not entirely in Wyoming

== List ==
Name	County(s)	Coordinates	Volume (Note: Volume given is the maximum flood pool, not the operational or live storage capacity.) (acre feet)	Volume (km^{3})	Elevation (Note: Elevation given is the elevation of reservoir at full pool, measured in feet.)	Inflow	Dam	Image
Flaming Gorge Reservoir	Sweetwater (WY)†, Daggett (UT)†	41°05′08″N 109°33′01″W	3,778,700	4.6610	6,040	Green River	Flaming Gorge Dam	
Pathfinder Reservoir	Carbon, Natrona	42°27′09″N 106°53′39″W	1,070,000	1.3198	5,852	North Platte River	Pathfinder Dam	
Seminoe Reservoir	Carbon, Albany	42°08′18″N 106°52′59″W	1,017,276	1.2548	6,357	North Platte River	Seminoe Dam	
Boysen Reservoir	Fremont	43°22′38″N 108°10′32″W	892,226	1.1006	4,732	Wind River	Boysen Dam	
Jackson Lake (Note: Jackson Lake is a natural lake, but was expanded with a dam first built in 1911, and enlarged in 1916.)	Teton	43°50′20″N 110°39′11″W	847,000	1.0448	6,770	Snake River	Jackson Lake Dam	
Glendo Reservoir	Platte, Converse	42°30′40″N 104°57′25″W	763,039	0.9412	4,653	North Platte River	Glendo Dam	
Buffalo Bill Reservoir	Park	44°29′35″N 109°12′09″W	646,565	0.7975	5,394	Shoshone River	Buffalo Bill Dam	
Fontenelle Reservoir	Lincoln, Sweetwater	42°03′10″N 110°05′19″W	345,360	0.4260	6,509	Green River	Fontenelle Dam	
Keyhole Reservoir	Crook	44°22′32″N 104°47′04″W	334,200	0.4122	4,114	Belle Fourche River	Keyhole Dam	
Alcova Reservoir	Natrona	42°32′14″N 106°44′08″W	184,405	0.2275	5,500	North Platte River	Alcova Dam	
Bull Lake Reservoir (Note: The natural Bull Lake was expanded with the completion of Bull Lake Dam in 1938.)	Fremont	43°12′18″N 109°03′36″W	152,459	0.1881	5,805	Bull Lake Creek	Bull Lake Dam	
Wheatland Reservoir Number 2	Albany	41°52′55″N 105°35′08″W	98,930	0.1220	6,968	Laramie River		
New Fork Lake (Note: New Fork Lake was expanded with the creation of New Fork Lake Dam.)	Sublette	43°05′26″N 109°57′30″W	45,900	0.0566	7,825	New Fork River	New Fork Lake Dam	
Guernsey Reservoir	Platte	42°19′09″N 104°47′55″W	45,612	0.0563	4,420	North Platte River	Guernsey Dam	

== See also ==
- List of dams and reservoirs in Wyoming
- List of largest reservoirs in the United States
- List of rivers in Wyoming
- List of lakes in Wyoming
