= Stateline Dam =

Reservoir in the state of Utah, United States

Coordinates: 40°59′14″N 110°23′04″W

Stateline Dam (National ID # UT10156) is a dam in Summit County, Utah, less than a half-mile south of the Utah-Wyoming state line.

The earthen rockfill dam was constructed between 1977 and 1979 by the United States Bureau of Reclamation with a height of 143 feet (44 m) and 2,900 feet (880 m) long at its crest. It impounds East Fork of Smiths Fork for flood control and irrigation storage, part of the Lyman Project, along with the nearby Meeks Cabin Dam. The dam is owned by the Bureau and is operated by the local Bridger Valley Water Conservancy District.

The reservoir it creates, Stateline Reservoir, has a water surface of 304 acres (123 ha) and has a maximum capacity of 12,000 acre-feet (15,000,000 m^{3}), and an elevation of 9,120 feet (2,780 m) Recreation includes fishing (for rainbow, brook, and cutthroat trout), boating, and camping at 41 Forest Service campsites. Although public access is unrestricted and the water quality is excellent, the water is too cold for most swimmers.

== Climate ==
Hewinta (Hewinta Guard Station) is a Remote Automated Weather Station located 4.6 miles (7.4 km) to the west of Stateline Reservoir at an altitude of 9519 feet (2901 m).

Climate data for Hewinta (RAWS), Utah, 1991–2020 normals, 1984-2020 extremes: 9519ft (2901m)
Month	Jan	Feb	Mar	Apr	May	Jun	Jul	Aug	Sep	Oct	Nov	Dec	Year
Record high °F (°C)	62 (17)	58 (14)	64 (18)	67 (19)	79 (26)	82 (28)	89 (32)	83 (28)	81 (27)	75 (24)	65 (18)	60 (16)	89 (32)
Mean maximum °F (°C)	52.7 (11.5)	50.2 (10.1)	54.9 (12.7)	58.8 (14.9)	66.5 (19.2)	75.8 (24.3)	80.4 (26.9)	78.3 (25.7)	74.4 (23.6)	67.1 (19.5)	57.5 (14.2)	51.5 (10.8)	80.8 (27.1)
Mean daily maximum °F (°C)	34.4 (1.3)	34.6 (1.4)	40.3 (4.6)	43.6 (6.4)	52.4 (11.3)	64.6 (18.1)	72.3 (22.4)	70.4 (21.3)	62.3 (16.8)	50.2 (10.1)	39.4 (4.1)	33.3 (0.7)	49.8 (9.9)
Daily mean °F (°C)	19.9 (−6.7)	19.7 (−6.8)	26.1 (−3.3)	30.1 (−1.1)	39.3 (4.1)	48.9 (9.4)	55.9 (13.3)	54.1 (12.3)	46.5 (8.1)	36.1 (2.3)	25.4 (−3.7)	19.1 (−7.2)	35.1 (1.7)
Mean daily minimum °F (°C)	5.4 (−14.8)	4.9 (−15.1)	11.9 (−11.2)	16.7 (−8.5)	26.2 (−3.2)	33.1 (0.6)	39.5 (4.2)	37.9 (3.3)	30.7 (−0.7)	22.1 (−5.5)	11.4 (−11.4)	4.9 (−15.1)	20.4 (−6.4)
Mean minimum °F (°C)	−16.1 (−26.7)	−16.5 (−26.9)	−8.2 (−22.3)	−1.4 (−18.6)	11.0 (−11.7)	23.3 (−4.8)	30.4 (−0.9)	28.2 (−2.1)	17.9 (−7.8)	1.7 (−16.8)	−10.6 (−23.7)	−18.4 (−28.0)	−23.0 (−30.6)
Record low °F (°C)	−36 (−38)	−41 (−41)	−22 (−30)	−15 (−26)	−4 (−20)	16 (−9)	23 (−5)	27 (−3)	1 (−17)	−18 (−28)	−21 (−29)	−35 (−37)	−41 (−41)
Average precipitation inches (mm)	2.25 (57)	2.14 (54)	2.40 (61)	2.79 (71)	2.53 (64)	1.52 (39)	1.74 (44)	1.89 (48)	1.92 (49)	2.16 (55)	2.26 (57)	2.11 (54)	25.71 (653)
Source 1: XMACIS2
Source 2: NOAA (Precipitation)
