= List of dam removals in Colorado =

This is a list of dams in Colorado that have been removed as physical impediments to free-flowing rivers or streams.

== Removals by watershed ==
=== Arkansas River ===
In 2019 the Cucharas Number 5 Dam was removed from the Cucharas River, a tributary of the Huerfano River, itself a tributary of the Arkansas River. This 1910 irrigation dam experienced structural problems throughout its life, including a partial failure in 1987 which resulted in the emergency dynamiting of a spillway. Reconstruction of the dam was proposed in the 2010s but was deemed economically infeasible. Following years of litigation, the State Engineer took emergency control of the dam in 2017 for safety reasons. The state removed it in 2019, recovering the cost in court from the dam's owners. At the time, it was the third-largest dam ever to be removed in the United States.

== Completed removals ==
Dam	Height	Year removed	Location	Watercourse	Watershed
Mt Shavano Dam (Salida Lowhead Dam)	15 ft (4.6 m)	2023	Chaffee County; 38.5518°N 106.0301°W	Arkansas River	Arkansas River
Riss East	56 ft (17 m)	2016	Teller County; 38.783°N 105.226°W	Tributary to Barnard Creek	Arkansas River
Riss North	38 ft (12 m)	2016	Teller County; 38.792°N 105.233°W	Tributary to Barnard Creek	Arkansas River
Riss South	50 ft (15 m)	2016	Teller County; 38.785°N 105.239°W	Tributary to Barnard Creek	Arkansas River
Dotson and Enlargement Dam	24 ft (7.3 m)	2015	Pueblo County; 38.128°N 104.197°W	Huerfano River	Arkansas River
Cucharas Number 5 Dam	135 ft (41 m)	2019	Huerfano County; 37.75°N 104.6°W	Cucharas River	Arkansas River
Idylwilde Dam	57 ft (17 m)	2013	Larimer County; 40.4288°N 105.312°W	Big Thompson River	Big Thompson River
Carriage Hills #2 Dam	10 ft (3.0 m)	2017	Estes Park; 40.35°N 105.5°W	Fish Creek	Big Thompson River
Glacier #1 Dam	11 ft (3.4 m)	1985	Rocky Mountain National Park; 40.505°N 105.597°W	North Fork Big Thompson River	Big Thompson River
Chipeta Dam	5 ft (1.5 m)	2006	Hotchkiss; 38.7845°N 107.7439°W	North Fork Gunnison River	Gunnison River
Hidden Treasure Dam		2019	Lake City; 38.021°N 107.3788°W	Henson Creek	Gunnison River
Lake George Diversion Dam (Lower Eleven Mile Dam)	25 ft (7.6 m)	2023	Park County; 38.9681°N 105.367°W	South Platte River	South Platte River
Pear Lake Dam	28 ft (8.5 m)	1988	Allenspark; 40.177°N 105.6233°W	Cony Creek	South Platte River
Dewey No. 1	15 ft (4.6 m)	2014	Denver; 39.8004°N 104.988°W		South Platte River
Lower Church Lake Dam	4 ft (1.2 m)	2015	Fort Lupton; 39.889°N 105.179°W	Big Dry Creek	South Platte River
Stanley Canyon Dam	30 ft (9.1 m)	2018	El Paso County; 38.99°N 104.93°W	Stanley Canyon Creek	South Platte River
Unnamed Dam #1 (Lamborn #1)	20 ft (6.1 m)	2002	Fort Morgan; 40.3668°N 103.935°W	Tributary to South Platte River	South Platte River
Unnamed Dam #2		2002		Tributary to South Platte River	South Platte River
Josh Ames Diversion Dam	6 ft (1.8 m)	2013	Fort Collins; 40.6051°N 105.1°W	Cache la Poudre River	South Platte River
Bluebird Dam	56 ft (17 m)	1990	Rocky Mountain National Park; 40.1926°N 105.6526°W	Ouzel Creek	South Platte River
Sand Beach Dam	25 ft (7.6 m)	1988	Allenspark; 40.2171°N 105.602°W	Sand Beach Creek	South Platte River
Hall Dam	40 ft (12 m)	2017	Jefferson County; 39.76°N 105.24°W	Clear Creek	South Platte River
Polaris Dam	22 ft (6.7 m)	2018	Glenwood Springs; 39.49°N 107.06°W	Tributary to Cattle Creek	South Platte River
Toby Wells Pond Dam	16 ft (4.9 m)	1989			
No Name #21 Dam		1990			
No Name #8 Dam	12 ft (3.7 m)	1990			
