= Parting of the Ways (Wyoming) =

- U.S. National Register of Historic Places
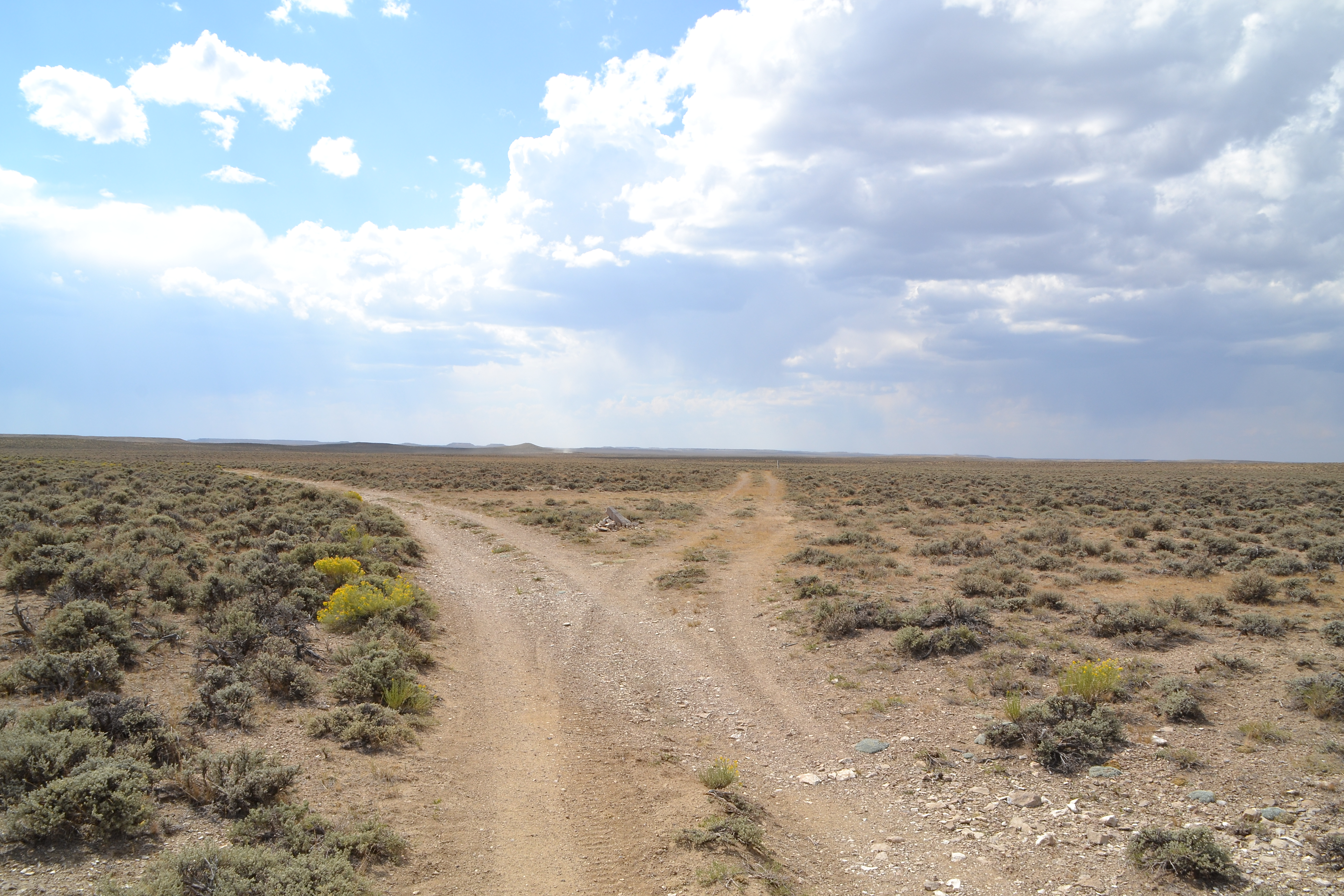

- Location within Wyoming Location within the United States
- Nearest city: Farson, Wyoming
- Coordinates: 42°15′27″N 109°13′42″W
- Built: 1844; 182 years ago
- NRHP reference No.: 76001962
- Added to NRHP: January 11, 1976

The Parting of the Ways is a historic site in Sweetwater County, Wyoming, United States, where the Oregon and California Trails fork from the original route to Fort Bridger to an alternative route, the Sublette-Greenwood Cutoff, across the Little Colorado Desert. Many wagon trains parted company, some preferring the shorter cutoff route, which involved fifty waterless miles, to the longer but better-watered main route.

The junction is marked by a small sandstone boulder about 15 inches (38 cm) high, placed by L.C. Bishop and Paul Henderson and inscribed with a left-pointing arrow with "F. Bridger" and a right-pointing arrow with "S. Cut Off." The route was not established by Sublette, but rather a mountain man named Greenwood. The error in attribution arose when Joseph E. Ware's Emigrant's Guide to California (1849) listed the alternate path as the "Sublette Cutoff."
