= Bull Lake glaciation =

Part of the Quaternary Ice Age in North America

The Bull Lake glaciation is the name of a glacial period in North America that is part of the Quaternary Ice Age. The Bull Lake glaciation began about 200,000 years ago and ended about 130,000 years ago, and was concurrent with the Illinoian Stage of the Quaternary Ice Age. There is disagreement over these time frames, however, and further research is necessary.

This glacial period was identified by geologist Eliot Blackwelder. It draws its name from Bull Lake in Wyoming in the United States, where well-preserved moraines from this glacial period were first described. Although Blackwelder originally believed the Bull Lake glaciation occurred during the early Wisconsin Glaciation (the last major advance of glaciers in the North America), new data generated and described by geologist Gerald M. Richmond in the 1940s and 1960s more accurately dated the glacial period to the Illinoian Stage.

The Bull Lake glaciation was a local glaciation. It did not cover the entire North American continent but rather just the eastern slopes of the southern Rocky Mountains. Generally speaking, it extended from northwestern Montana south to the San Juan Mountains in Colorado. The Bull Lake glaciation has three periods—Early, Middle and Late—punctuated by periods of relative warmth (during which glaciers retreated).

The Bull Lake glaciation is generally considered to be much less extensive than the preceding glaciations. However, the reach of the glaciers varied from place to place, extending further in some areas than others. Bull Lake moraines remain relatively undisturbed, indicating that glacial periods which came later were only about 90 percent as extensive as the Bull Lake glaciation.

The Bull Lake Glaciation was followed by a warm interglacial period that lasted about 60,000 years. The Pinedale Glaciation, another local glacial period, occurred after this warm period.
