= Midview Dam =

Reservoir in the state of Utah, United States

Coordinates: 40°11′05″N 110°09′45″W

Midview Dam (National ID # UT10126) is a dam in Duchesne County, Utah, about twelve miles east of the town of Duchesne.

The earthen dam was constructed between 1935 and 1937 by the United States Bureau of Reclamation and the Civilian Conservation Corps, with a height of 54 feet (16 m), and a length of 1,901 feet (579 m) at its crest. It is an offstream storage reservoir related to the other facilities of the Bureau's Moon Lake Project for flood control and irrigation. The dam is owned by the Bureau, and operated by the local Moon Lake Water Users Association.

The reservoir it creates, Midview Lake, also known as Lake Boreham, has a normal water surface of 402 acres (163 ha) and has a maximum capacity of 5,785 acre-feet (7,136,000 m^{3}), and an elevation of 5,262 feet (1,604 m).
