= Mann Creek Dam =

Dam in Washington County, Idaho, United States

Coordinates: 44°23′29″N 116°53′45″W

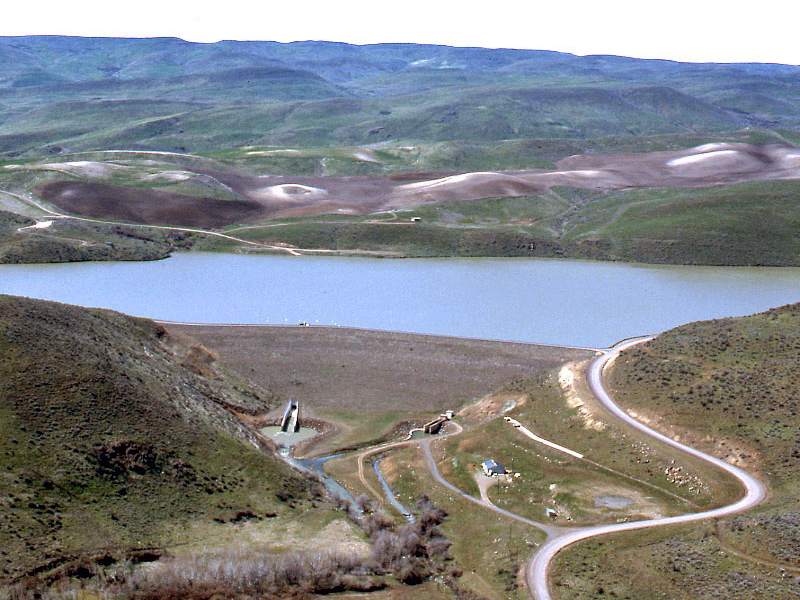

Mann Creek Dam (National ID # ID00285) is a dam in Washington County, Idaho, in the western part of the state, a few miles north-northeast of the town of Weiser.

The earthen dam was an irrigation project of the United States Bureau of Reclamation. Completed in 1967, the dam impounds Mann Creek with a height of 148 feet (45 m) above bedrock, and a length of 1,176 feet (358 m) along its crest. The dam is operated by the local Mann Creek Irrigation District.

Mann Creek Reservoir has a surface area of 283 acres (115 ha) at an elevation of 2,890 feet (880 m). At closure it had a maximum capacity of 13,000 acre-feet (16,000,000 m^{3}) but siltation reduced that number to 10,900 acre-feet (13,400,000 m^{3}) by 1992. The western side of the lake is the location of the former Mann Creek State Park. Boating and fishing are the main recreational activities.
