= Big Sandy River (Wyoming) =

River in Wyoming, United States

Coordinates: 41°51′05″N 109°46′58″W

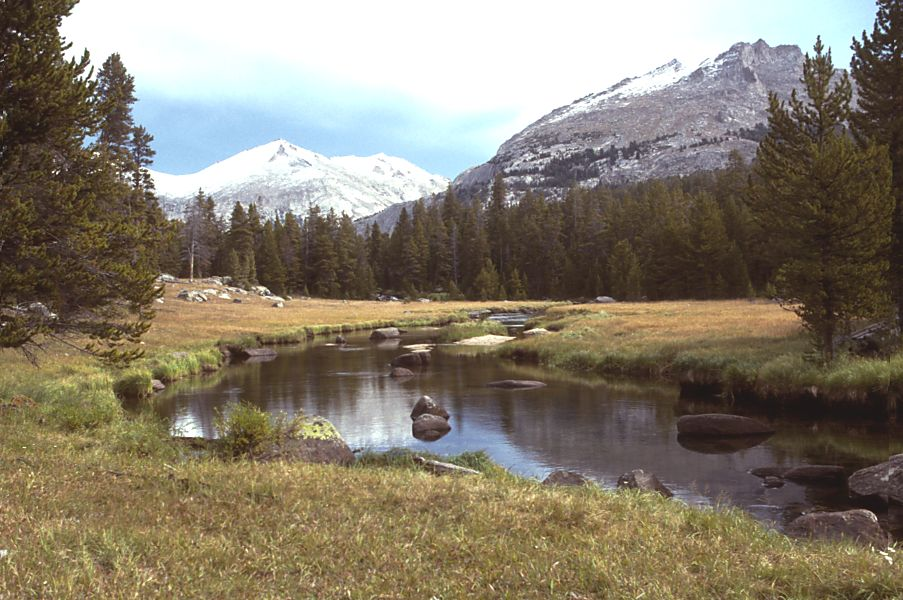
Big Sandy Creek, Wyoming

The Big Sandy River (also called Big Sandy Creek) is a 141-mile-long (227 km) tributary of the Green River in Wyoming in the United States.

== Course ==
It rises in eastern Sublette County, on the west side of the continental divide in the southern Wind River Range, in the Bridger Wilderness Area of the Bridger-Teton National Forest.

It flows south, southwest, southeast, then southwest, past the town of Farson and joins the Green in western Sweetwater County.

Above Farson, it is dammed to form the Big Sandy Reservoir.

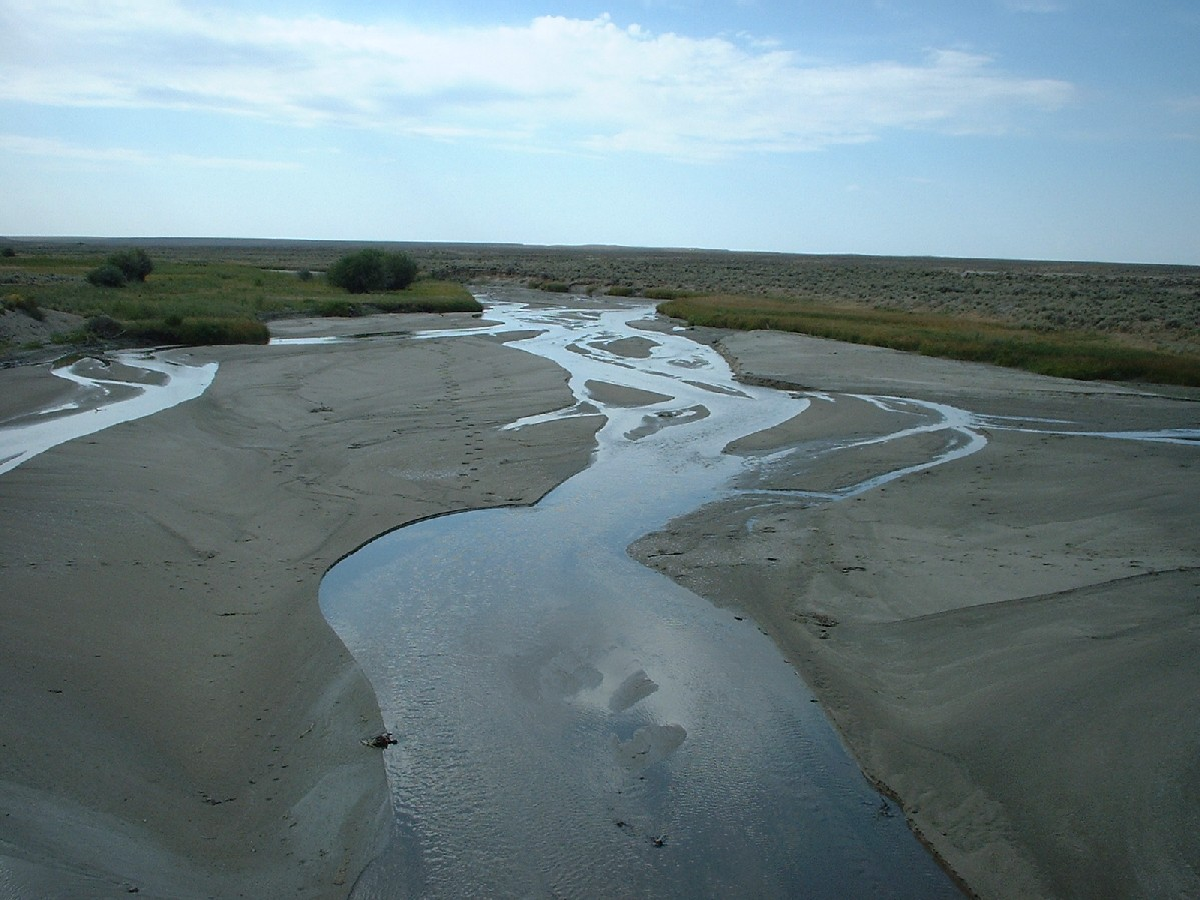
Big Sandy River streamflow near Farson in September 2002 during drought conditions.

== See also ==
- Green River (Colorado River) topics
- List of Wyoming rivers
- List of tributaries of the Colorado River
- Tributaries of the Colorado River in Wyoming
