= Top of the World Windpower Project =

Coordinates: 42°55′30″N 105°46′19″W

The Top of the World Windpower Project is a 200 megawatt wind farm located near Casper, Wyoming, USA. The project, operated by Duke Energy, was constructed on approximately 17,000 acres (6,900 ha) of land held under long-term lease in Converse County. The Top of the World Windpower Project began operation in 2010.

The U.S. Department of Justice brought charges against the operators concerning the deaths of 14 eagles and other migratory birds at the facility between 2010 and 2013. A settlement agreement was reached with Duke Energy paying federal fines and restitution amounting to $1 million.

== See also ==
- Wind power in the United States
- List of onshore wind farms
