= Cucharas River =

River in Pueblo and Huefano counties in Colorado, United States

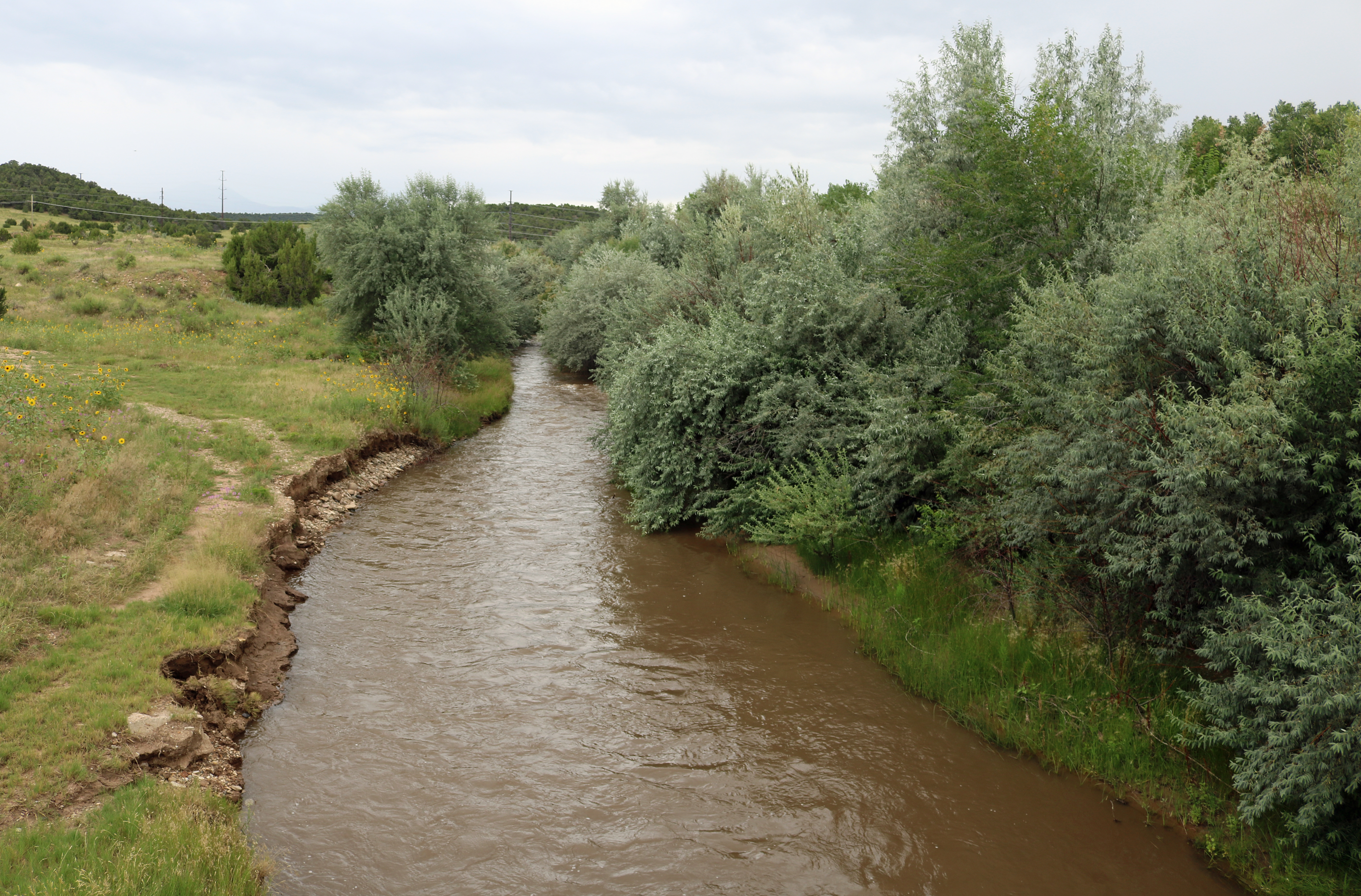
- The river in Walsenburg.

Physical characteristics
- Source
  - coordinates: 37°20′23″N 105°05′36″W
- Mouth
  - location: Confluence with Huerfano
  - coordinates: 37°54′58″N 104°31′56″W
  - elevation: 5,121 ft (1,561 m)

Basin features
- Progression: Huerfano—Arkansas—Mississippi

Cucharas River is a 75-mile-long (121 km) tributary of the Huerfano River that flows from a source in Huerfano County, Colorado, southwest of the Spanish Peaks in San Isabel National Forest. The river passes through La Veta and Walsenburg before joining the Huerfano River in Pueblo County.

== Cucharas Canyon ==
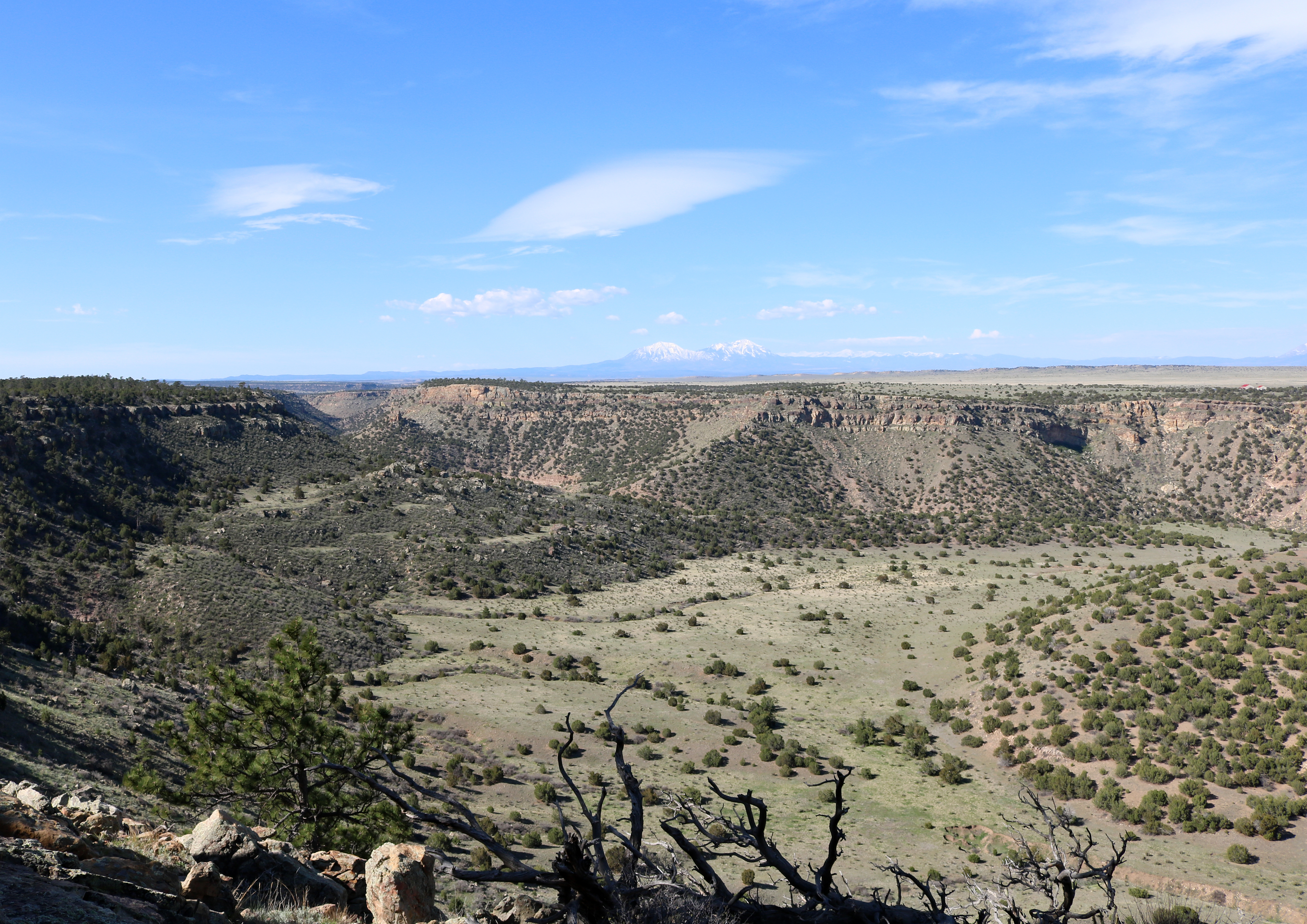
A view from the canyon's east rim, looking southwest towards the Spanish Peaks.

Northeast of Walsenburg, the river creates a deep, wild canyon called Cucharas Canyon. Much of the land in and adjacent to the canyon was purchased by the Bureau of Land Management in 1998 and is open to the public for recreational activities such as hiking, horseback riding, and hunting. Access to the canyon is via county roads, with trailheads on either side. There are few visitors, and opportunities for solitude are abundant.

== Dams ==
=== Cucharas Number 5 Dam removal ===
The Cucharas #5 Dam was a 135-foot (41 m) tall irrigation dam on the Cucharas River 15 miles (24 km) northeast of Walsenburg. Built in 1910, it experienced structural problems throughout its life, including a partial failure in 1987 which resulted in the emergency dynamiting of a spillway. Reconstruction of the dam was proposed in the 2010s but was deemed economically infeasible. Following years of litigation, the State Engineer took emergency control of the dam in 2017 for safety reasons. The state removed it in 2019, recovering the cost in court from the dam's owners. At the time, it was the third-largest dam ever to be removed in the United States.

== See also ==
- List of rivers of Colorado
