= Belle Fourche Dam =

Coordinates: 44°44′09″N 103°40′27″W

- U.S. National Register of Historic Places
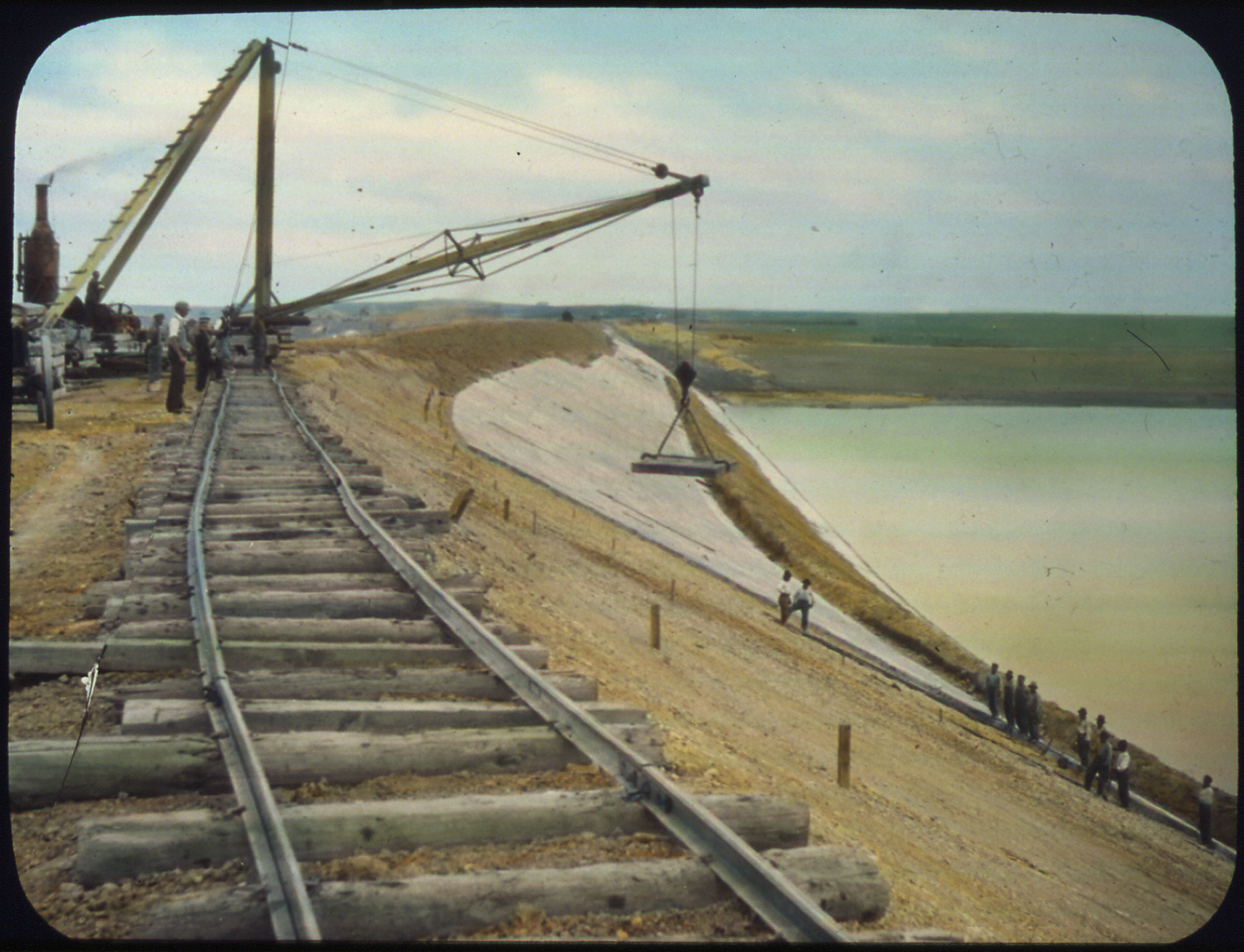
- Construction of the Belle Fourche Dam, circa 1904

- Location within South Dakota Location within the United States
- Location: Butte County, South Dakota
- Nearest city: Belle Fourche, South Dakota
- Area: 8,063 acres (3,263 ha)
- Built: 1911
- Built by: United States Bureau of Reclamation
- NRHP reference No.: 77001239
- Added to NRHP: November 23, 1977

The Belle Fourche Dam, also known as Orman Dam, is a dam on Owl Creek in Butte County, South Dakota, USA, approximately 8 miles (13 km) east of Belle Fourche, South Dakota, along U.S. Route 212. Its construction created the Belle Fourche Reservoir, the Belle Fourche National Wildlife Refuge, and the Rocky Point Recreation Area.

The reservoir has approximately 8,000 acres (3,200 ha) of water surface, 6,700 acres (2,700 ha) of land, and 58 miles (93 km) of shoreline. It is stocked with walleye, catfish, and white bass. Average depth is 25 feet (7.6 m), but it has areas as deep as 60 feet (18 m) at full capacity. Common activities at BFR (Belle Fourche Reservoir)include boating, fishing, ice fishing, ice skating, camping, cooking out, water skiing, and fossil hunting.

Construction occurred in several stages between 1903 and 1907. The dam was the first project undertaken by the United States Bureau of Reclamation (USBR). At its 1911 completion by the USBR, Belle Fourche Dam was the largest earthen dam in the world. The dam is listed on the National Register of Historic Places. In 1989, it was listed among the approximately 250 Historic Civil Engineering Landmarks.

The dam is described as "a homogeneous earthfill structure containing about 1,783,000 cubic yards (1,363,000 m^{3}) of material. It has a maximum base width of 650 feet (200 m), a structural height of 122 feet (37 m), and a hydraulic height of 97 feet (30 m). The crest of the dam at elevation 2,989.75 feet (911.28 m) has a length of 6,262 feet (1,909 m) and a width of 19 feet (5.8 m)."
