= Big Sandy Dam =

- Location within Wyoming
- Country: United States
- Location: Upper Colorado River Basin
- Coordinates: 42°15′01″N 109°25′42″W
- Purpose: Irrigation
- Status: Operational
- Construction began: July 1941
- Opening date: 1952
- Built by: United States Bureau of Reclamation
- Operators: Eden Valley Irrigation and Drainage District

Dam and spillways
- Type of dam: Earth fill dam
- Impounds: Big Sandy River
- Height (foundation): 85 feet (26 m)
- Elevation at crest: 6,769 feet (2,063 m)
- Dam volume: 840,000 cubic yards (640,000 m^{3})
- Spillway capacity: 7,350 cubic feet per second (208 m^{3}/s)

Reservoir
- Creates: Big Sandy Reservoir
- Total capacity: 38,300 acre-feet (47,200 ML)
- Surface area: 2,500 acres (1,000 ha)

Big Sandy Dam (National Inventory of Dams ID WY01387) is a dam in Sweetwater County, Wyoming, about ten miles north of Farson.

The earthen dam impounds the Big Sandy River and stands 85 feet high. It was built from 1941 to 1952 by the United States Bureau of Reclamation as part of its Eden Project for irrigation storage. No hydroelectric power is generated here. The dam is operated by the local Eden Valley Irrigation and Drainage District.

Big Sandy Reservoir has a surface area of about 2,500 acres (10 km^{2}) and contains a maximum capacity of 38,300 acre-feet (47 million cubic meters). The lake allows for boating, camping and fishing recreation with primitive facilities.
