= Sweetwater Solar =

Solar power plant in Sweetwater County, Wyoming

Sweetwater Solar Station
- Country: United States
- Location: Sweetwater County, Wyoming
- Coordinates: 41.62704°N 109.68502°W
- Status: Operational
- Construction began: July 1, 2018
- Commission date: December 2018
- Construction cost: $157.7 million
- Owner: Sweetwater Solar
- Operator: Swinerton Renewable Energy

Solar farm
- Type: Flat-panel PV
- Site area: 703 acres (1,714,691 m²)

Power generation
- Units operational: 250,000 PV modules
- Make and model: Hanwha Q CELLS
- Nameplate capacity: 80 MW_{AC}
- Annual net output: 186,575 MWh
- Sold electricity to Rocky Mountain Power under a 20-year Power Purchase Agreement (PPA)

The Sweetwater Solar PV Park is a 97.8-megawatt photovoltaic power station located in Sweetwater County, Wyoming, approximately 11 miles northwest of Green River, along State Highway 372. The project, developed by Clenera, Energy of Utah, was commissioned in December 2018. Covering an area of 703 acres, it generates approximately 186,575 megawatt-hours of electricity annually—enough to power 17,000 households while offsetting 44,000 metric tons of carbon dioxide emissions each year.

As of 2025, the park is the largest single solar energy facility in Wyoming

== Planning ==
Sweetwater County Commissioners unanimously supported the project, which is located primarily on federal land managed by the Bureau of Land Management (BLM). Wildlife impact studies and mitigation strategies were incorporated into the project to address concerns regarding birds, bats, and other native species such as bighorn sheep and pronghorn.

== Construction ==
The $157.7 million project uses ground-mounted single-axis tracker solar panels supplied by Nextpower (then known as Nextracker) and 250,000 photovoltaic modules manufactured by Hanwha Q CELLS. It also utilizes 30 inverters from Sungrow Power Supply. Construction began on July 1, 2018, and was completed within six months, creating up to 300 jobs during the process.

== Electricity production ==
The electricity generated by the park is sold to Rocky Mountain Power under a 20-year Power Purchase Agreement (PPA). The site was chosen for its open space, proximity to energy infrastructure, and its alignment with Wyoming's push towards renewable energy.

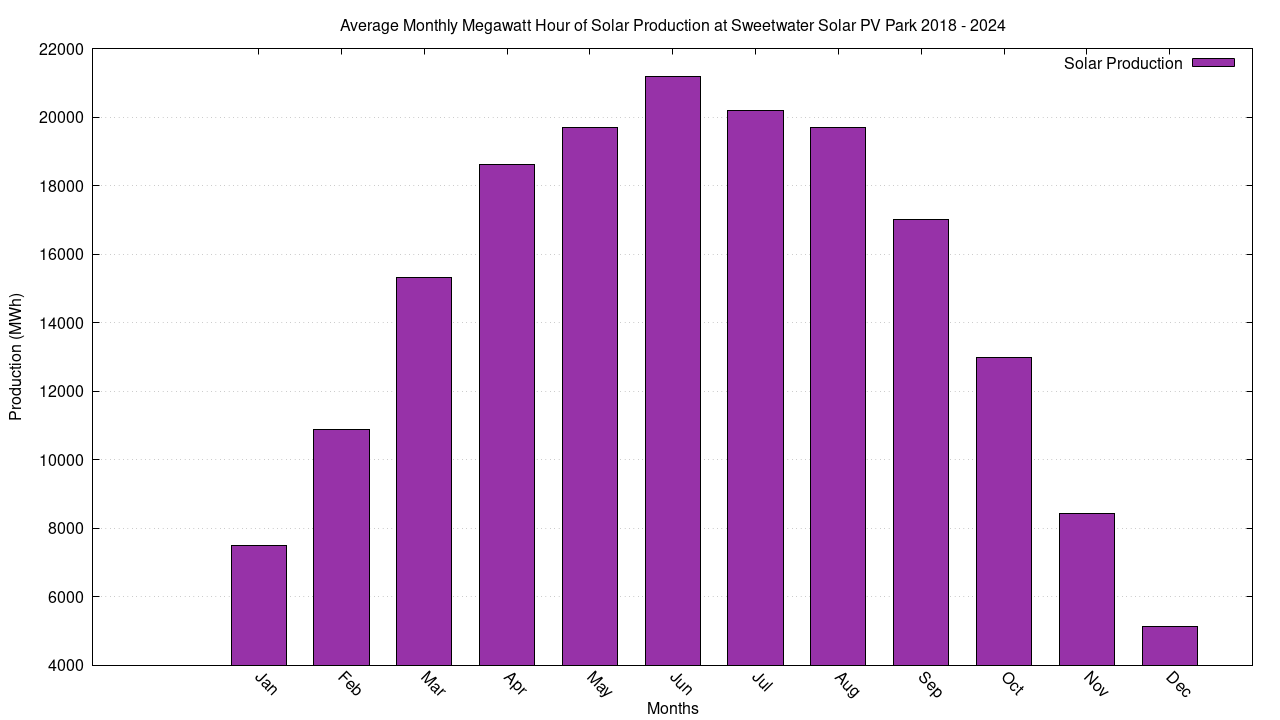
Average monthly solar energy production in megawatt-hours at Sweetwater Solar PV Park in Wyoming

Generation (MW·h) of Sweetwater Solar
Year	Jan	Feb	Mar	Apr	May	Jun	Jul	Aug	Sep	Oct	Nov	Dec	Total
2018												824	824
2019	6,850	9,267	15,581	16,262	18,920	23,288	23,366	22,244	16,920	13,716	8,357	5,367	159,138
2020	7,801	12,977	14,867	19,745	21,292	19,776	8,966	18,119	14,810	11,483	8,621	6,907	155,384
2021	8,331	10,583	15,320	18,879	21,165	20,529	21,011	18,587	17,800	12,072	8,794	6,001	178,072
2022	9,851	11,055	16,405	17,887	20,085	22,416	22,572	19,866	17,837	14,366	7,987	5,582	185,909
2023	5,917	10,639	16,000	19,695	16,034	18,965	22,065	19,674	17,129	13,155	8,312	6,104	173,689
2024	6,202	10,770	13,641	19,169	20,719	22,124	23,137	19,714	17,502	13,151			166,129
