= Bull Lake Dam =

Coordinates: 43°12′43″N 109°02′36″W

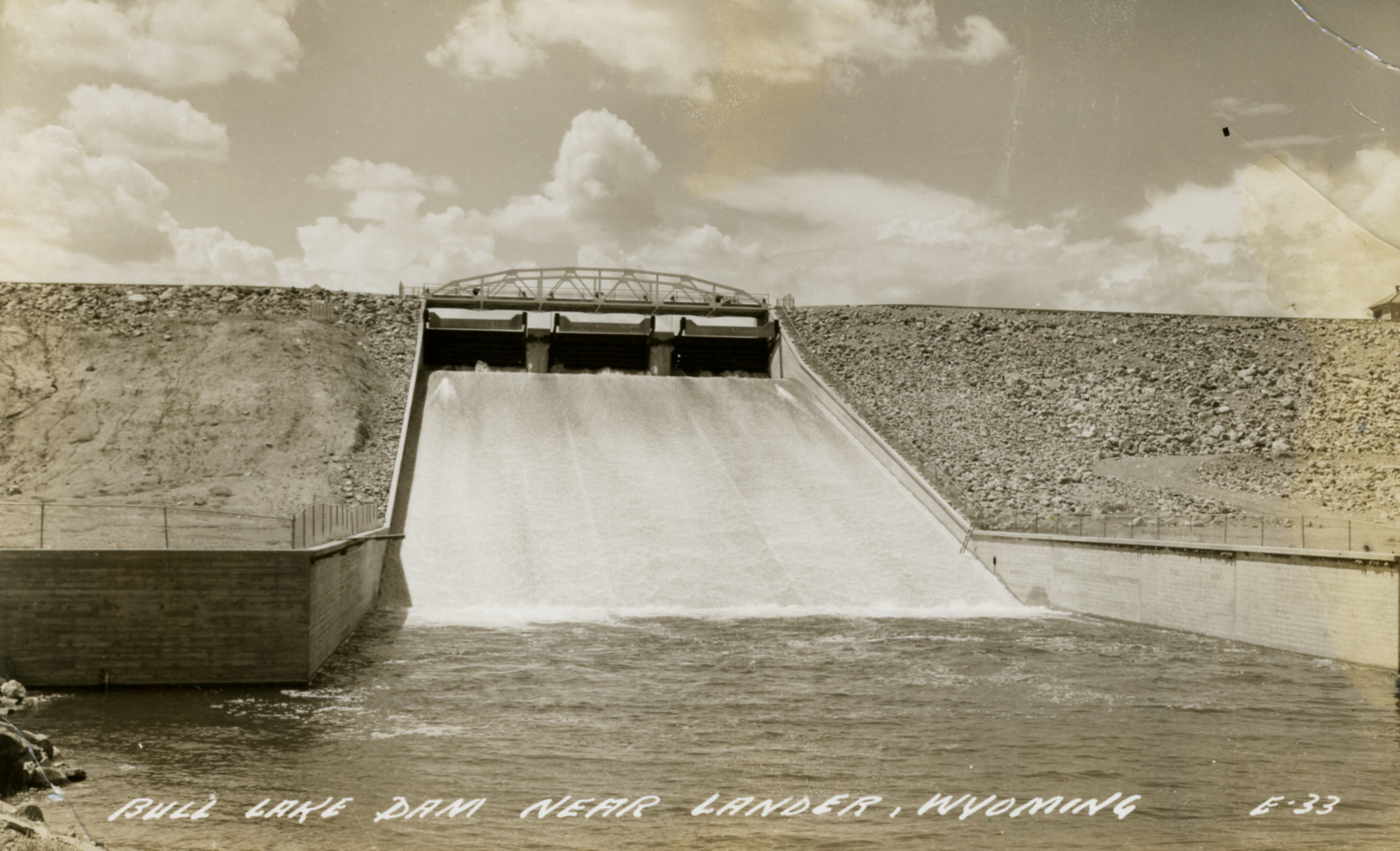
- Interactive map of Bull Lake Dam
- Country: United States
- Location: Fremont County, Wyoming
- Status: Operational
- Construction began: 1936
- Opening date: 1938

Bull Lake Dam (National ID # WY01378) is a dam in Fremont County, Wyoming within the Wind River Indian Reservation.

The earthen dam was constructed between 1936 and 1938 by the United States Bureau of Reclamation with a height of 81 feet. It impounds Bull Lake Creek for irrigation storage and flood control, as part of the Riverton Unit of the extensive, multi-state Pick–Sloan Missouri Basin Program. The dam is owned by the Bureau and is operated by the local Midvale Irrigation District.

The reservoir it creates, Bull Lake Reservoir (so named because the reservoir expanded an existing smaller natural lake) has a capacity of 151,737 acre-feet. Recreation includes fishing.

Bull Lake gave its name to Bull Lake glaciation, the name of a glacial period in North America that is part of the Quaternary Ice Age.

Bull Lake is named for the Shoshone word for the lake, Baa Guchuna Yagait, literally Water Buffalo Crier, which refers to water where a buffalo cried or bellowed.

== See also ==
- List of largest reservoirs of Wyoming
