= Glendo Reservoir =

Glendo Dam
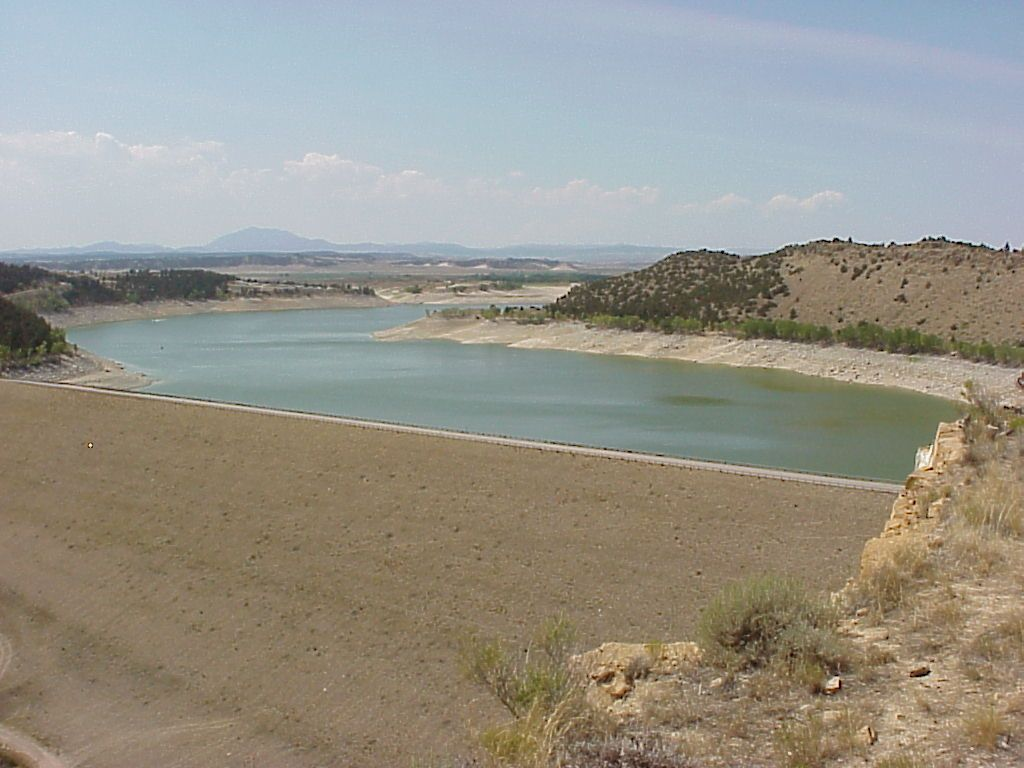
- Glendo Dam in the Glendo State Park (2002)
- Interactive map of Glendo Dam
- Country: United States
- Location: Platte / Converse counties, Wyoming, USA
- Coordinates: 42°28′47″N 104°56′54″W
- Construction began: 1954
- Opening date: 1958
- Operator: U.S. Bureau of Reclamation

Dam and spillways
- Impounds: North Platte River
- Height: 190 feet (58 m)
- Length: 2,096 feet (639 m)

Reservoir
- Creates: Glendo Reservoir
- Normal elevation: 4,639 ft (1,414 m)

Power Station
- Installed capacity: 38 MW
- Annual generation: 57,707,000 KWh

Glendo Reservoir is a reservoir located on the North Platte River in Platte County and Converse County in the U.S. State of Wyoming. The reservoir is formed by Glendo Dam. The earthfill dam is 2,096 feet (639 m) feet long and 190 feet (58 m) high and contains two hydroelectric turbines capable of generating 38 megawatts of power. The reservoir retains a maximum of 1,170,505 acre-feet (1.443797×10^{9} m^{3}) of water used primarily for irrigation and flood control.

The reservoir is popular for water sports and fishing. It is located completely within Glendo State Park.

== History ==
Glendo Reservoir was developed as part of the Pick-Sloan Missouri Basin Program. Investigations into creating the reservoir began in 1944; construction was delayed due to legal disputes regarding water rights in Wyoming, Nebraska, and Colorado. In 1945, the Supreme Court found that the decree over the North Platte River needed to be amended before construction could start. The amendment was finalized nine years later in 1954, and the Glendo Reservoir was born.

Glendo Reservoir's earthfill dam, standing 190 feet (58 m) high, was completed in 1957. It required rerouting of several railroad tracks owned by the Chicago, Burlington and Quincy Railroad, four miles west of U.S. Route 87. It was dedicated on June 9, 1959. Glendo was designed to reduce siltation downstream at Guernsey Reservoir, as well as hydroelectric power generation.

== Geology ==
Glendo Reservoir exposes a record spanning 300 million years. The oldest rocks are along the northwestern edge and belong to the Hartville Formation. Rocks in this formation contain Pennsylvanian Age and Permian aged grey limestones and sandstone, which were deposited as a result of a shallow sub-tropical ocean. Red shale of the Chugwater formation is also found, and dates to the Triassic period.

== See also ==
- List of largest reservoirs of Wyoming
