= Anchor Dam =

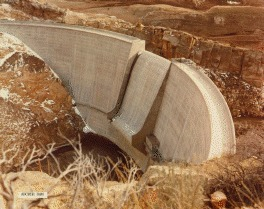
- Anchor Dam
- Interactive map of Anchor Dam
- Country: United States
- Location: Hot Springs County, Wyoming
- Coordinates: 43°39′51″N 108°49′28″W
- Purpose: Irrigation
- Status: Operational, but not as designed
- Operator: Owl Creek Irrigation District

Dam and spillways
- Type of dam: Arch dam
- Impounds: South Fork of Owl Creek
- Height (foundation): 208 feet (63 m)

Reservoir
- Creates: Anchor Reservoir
- Total capacity: 17,400 acre-feet (21,500,000 m^{3}) (designed)

Anchor Dam is a dam in Hot Springs County, Wyoming, about 35 miles (56 km) west of Thermopolis.

The concrete thin-arch dam was completed in 1960 by the United States Bureau of Reclamation as a water storage project. The 208-foot (63 m)-high dam structure impounds the water of the South Fork of Owl Creek, with the spillway as designed as a central overflow.

During construction, the discovery of solution cavities in the bedrock forced the re-positioning and re-configuration of the dam, causing delays and added expense. The same karst solution cavities prevented Anchor Reservoir from filling its design capacity of 17,400 acre-feet (21,500,000 m^{3}). It has never been full. More than 50 sinkholes had been identified in the underlying Chugwater Formation geology of the reservoir basin, with at least one of them 30 feet (9.1 m) in diameter and 35 feet (11 m) deep. The site's lack of "hydraulic integrity" was well known to Bureau scientists before and during construction.

The reservoir fills enough to provide some irrigation benefit through July and August of each season. It is operated by the local Owl Creek Irrigation District.
