= Grassy Lake Dam =

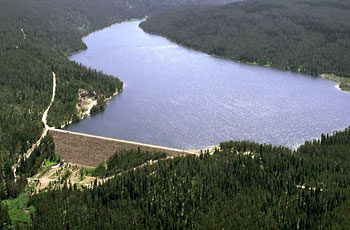

- Location within Wyoming
- Interactive map of Grassy Lake Dam
- Location: Teton County, Wyoming, near Yellowstone National Park
- Coordinates: 44°07′51.52″N 110°49′07.77″W
- Construction began: 1937
- Opening date: 1939
- Operator: U.S. Bureau of Reclamation

Dam and spillways
- Type of dam: Zoned earthfill dam
- Impounds: Grassy Creek
- Height: 118 ft (36 m)
- Length: 1,170 ft (360 m)
- Spillway capacity: Ungated bathtub

Reservoir
- Creates: Grassy Creek Reservoir
- Total capacity: 15,200 acre-feet (0.0187 km^{3})
- Catchment area: 3.65 sq mi (9.5 km^{2})

Grassy Lake Dam is a small dam operated by the U.S. Bureau of Reclamation in Teton County, Wyoming, immediately to the south of Yellowstone National Park. The dam lies in a corridor of Caribou-Targhee National Forest that runs between Yellowstone and Grand Teton National Parks. The dam structure and outlets are within a few hundred feet of the south boundary of Yellowstone. The zoned earthfill dam was built between 1937 and 1939 as part of the Minidoka Project, which provides water to irrigate farmland in Idaho's Snake River Plain.

The dam provides only water storage, impounding 15,200 acre-feet (0.0187 km^{3}). Given the small catchment area of Grassy Creek, inflow is augmented by a 0.7-mile (1.1 km) ditch that moves water from Cascade Creek into the reservoir.

== Bechler Meadows dam proposals ==
The Grassy Lake Dam and the Island Park Reservoir in Idaho were the outcome of an ambitious plan to use the abundant waters of Yellowstone National Park for irrigation in Idaho, Montana and Wyoming. A variety of projects were proposed starting in 1919, the most advanced of which involved a proposed reservoir in the Bechler Meadows and Falls River regions of the southwest corner of the park, immediately to the north of the Grassy Lake site. In 1926 Idaho politicians led by Representative Addison T. Smith proposed the withdrawal of the Bechler area from the park for construction of a reservoir to collect water for use in Idaho. The backlash from conservationists, who compared the proposed reservoir to the Hetch Hetchy Reservoir in Yosemite National Park, derailed the plan, along with disagreements between Wyoming, Montana and Idaho over water rights. The Grassy Lake and Island Park reservoirs were built outside the park as alternative storage sites.

== Climate ==
Climate data for Grassy Lake, Wyoming, 1991–2020 normals, 1988-2020: 7265ft (2214m)
Month	Jan	Feb	Mar	Apr	May	Jun	Jul	Aug	Sep	Oct	Nov	Dec	Year
Record high °F (°C)	48 (9)	52 (11)	63 (17)	71 (22)	79 (26)	85 (29)	92 (33)	91 (33)	84 (29)	75 (24)	61 (16)	46 (8)	92 (33)
Mean maximum °F (°C)	39.0 (3.9)	44.6 (7.0)	55.2 (12.9)	62.9 (17.2)	70.6 (21.4)	78.9 (26.1)	84.3 (29.1)	83.5 (28.6)	77.2 (25.1)	66.3 (19.1)	50.2 (10.1)	38.0 (3.3)	84.6 (29.2)
Mean daily maximum °F (°C)	26.9 (−2.8)	31.4 (−0.3)	40.2 (4.6)	47.0 (8.3)	56.0 (13.3)	64.0 (17.8)	74.5 (23.6)	73.5 (23.1)	63.4 (17.4)	48.2 (9.0)	34.3 (1.3)	25.6 (−3.6)	48.8 (9.3)
Daily mean °F (°C)	17.0 (−8.3)	19.7 (−6.8)	26.9 (−2.8)	33.9 (1.1)	42.4 (5.8)	49.3 (9.6)	57.5 (14.2)	56.2 (13.4)	47.7 (8.7)	36.4 (2.4)	23.9 (−4.5)	15.8 (−9.0)	35.6 (2.0)
Mean daily minimum °F (°C)	7.2 (−13.8)	7.9 (−13.4)	13.6 (−10.2)	20.7 (−6.3)	28.8 (−1.8)	34.6 (1.4)	40.4 (4.7)	38.8 (3.8)	32.0 (0.0)	24.5 (−4.2)	13.5 (−10.3)	6.1 (−14.4)	22.3 (−5.4)
Mean minimum °F (°C)	−18.1 (−27.8)	−16.7 (−27.1)	−10.7 (−23.7)	2.0 (−16.7)	15.4 (−9.2)	26.3 (−3.2)	31.5 (−0.3)	28.9 (−1.7)	22.6 (−5.2)	8.5 (−13.1)	−9.4 (−23.0)	−18.8 (−28.2)	−23.9 (−31.1)
Record low °F (°C)	−31 (−35)	−32 (−36)	−25 (−32)	−12 (−24)	1 (−17)	20 (−7)	26 (−3)	17 (−8)	13 (−11)	−17 (−27)	−24 (−31)	−31 (−35)	−32 (−36)
Average precipitation inches (mm)	7.27 (185)	5.44 (138)	5.41 (137)	5.04 (128)	4.20 (107)	3.24 (82)	1.19 (30)	1.55 (39)	2.24 (57)	3.69 (94)	5.71 (145)	7.33 (186)	52.31 (1,328)
Source 1: XMACIS2
Source 2: NOAA (Precipitation)
