= Farson, Wyoming =

Census-designated place in Sweetwater County, Wyoming, United States

- Census-designated place
- US-191 in Farson

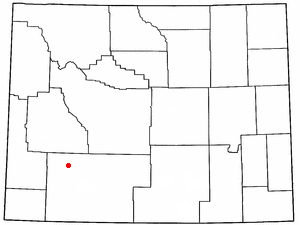
- Location of Farson, Wyoming
- Coordinates: 42°08′50″N 109°25′12″W
- Country: United States
- State: Wyoming
- County: Sweetwater

Area
  - Total: 77.8 sq mi (201.4 km^{2})
  - Land: 75.4 sq mi (195.4 km^{2})
  - Water: 2.4 sq mi (6.1 km^{2})
- Elevation: 6,595 ft (2,010 m)

Population (2010)
  - Total: 313
  - Density: 4.1/sq mi (1.6/km^{2})
- Time zone: UTC−7 (Mountain (MST))
  - Summer (DST): UTC−6 (MDT)
- ZIP code: 82932
- Area code: 307
- FIPS code: 56-26055
- GNIS feature ID: 2408204

Farson is a census-designated place (CDP) in Sweetwater County, Wyoming, United States. The population was 313 at the 2010 census.

== History ==
Eden Farson Fire District Building

Farson and nearby Eden are located near an archaeological site dating to the Protohistoric period. It contains the remains of at least 12 lodges and a massive bone bed of over 200 pronghorn, indicating it was a site for communal hunting and processing. Farson served as a relay station for the Pony Express and stagecoaches was located at the crossing of the Big Sandy River. It served as a vital stop for mail and travelers until 1862. Farson is near Simpsons Hollow, located approximately 10 miles southwest. This site was the location of a famous 1857 raid during the "Utah War." Mormon militia burned 26 U.S. Army supply wagons to prevent federal troops from reaching Salt Lake City. Farson owes its name to John Farson, a Chicago broker and financier. In 1907, under the Carey Act, he backed the Eden Irrigation and Land Company to bring water to the valley.

== Demographics ==
As of the census of 2000, there were 242 people, 96 households, and 69 families residing in the CDP. The population density was 3.2 people per square mile (1.2/km^{2}). There were 118 housing units at an average density of 1.6/sq mi (0.6/km^{2}). The racial makeup of the CDP was 96.28% White, 0.83% African American, 1.65% from other races, and 1.24% from two or more races. Hispanic or Latino of any race were 5.37% of the population.

There were 96 households, out of which 30.2% had children under the age of 18 living with them, 64.6% were married couples living together, 5.2% had a female householder with no husband present, and 28.1% were non-families. 26.0% of all households were made up of individuals, and 9.4% had someone living alone who was 65 years of age or older. The average household size was 2.52 and the average family size was 3.01.

In the CDP, the population was spread out, with 23.6% under the age of 18, 8.7% from 18 to 24, 25.2% from 25 to 44, 31.8% from 45 to 64, and 10.7% who were 65 years of age or older. The median age was 40 years. For every 100 females, there were 103.4 males. For every 100 females age 18 and over, there were 110.2 males.

The median income for a household in the CDP was $44,545, and the median income for a family was $56,806. Males had a median income of $41,364 versus $21,250 for females. The per capita income for the CDP was $16,140. None of the population or families were below the poverty line.

== Geography ==
According to the United States Census Bureau, the CDP has a total area of 77.8 square miles (201.4 km^{2}), of which 75.4 square miles (195.4 km^{2}) of land and 2.3 square miles (6.1 km^{2}) (3.02%) is water.

Farson lies at the intersection of U.S. 191 and Wyoming Highway 28 (the South Pass Highway). It is 40 miles north of Rock Springs and approximately 45 miles southwest of South Pass.

=== Climate ===
According to the Köppen Climate Classification system, Farson has a cold semi-arid climate, abbreviated "BSk" on climate maps. The hottest temperature recorded in Farson was 105 °F (41 °C) on July 14, 2026, while the coldest temperature recorded was −52 °F (−47 °C) on December 31, 1978.

Climate data for Farson, Wyoming, 1991–2020 normals, extremes 1915–present
Month	Jan	Feb	Mar	Apr	May	Jun	Jul	Aug	Sep	Oct	Nov	Dec	Year
Record high °F (°C)	55 (13)	58 (14)	77 (25)	82 (28)	91 (33)	97 (36)	105 (41)	97 (36)	93 (34)	81 (27)	71 (22)	70 (21)	105 (41)
Mean maximum °F (°C)	39.7 (4.3)	43.3 (6.3)	58.1 (14.5)	70.7 (21.5)	79.0 (26.1)	85.3 (29.6)	90.0 (32.2)	88.0 (31.1)	82.1 (27.8)	72.3 (22.4)	56.3 (13.5)	42.7 (5.9)	88.2 (31.2)
Mean daily maximum °F (°C)	27.5 (−2.5)	30.1 (−1.1)	42.5 (5.8)	53.8 (12.1)	64.1 (17.8)	74.1 (23.4)	82.9 (28.3)	80.6 (27.0)	71.0 (21.7)	57.2 (14.0)	41.2 (5.1)	29.8 (−1.2)	54.6 (12.5)
Daily mean °F (°C)	11.5 (−11.4)	14.3 (−9.8)	28.1 (−2.2)	38.0 (3.3)	47.8 (8.8)	57.0 (13.9)	64.0 (17.8)	62.1 (16.7)	52.1 (11.2)	39.6 (4.2)	25.6 (−3.6)	13.7 (−10.2)	37.8 (3.2)
Mean daily minimum °F (°C)	−4.4 (−20.2)	−1.6 (−18.7)	13.6 (−10.2)	22.2 (−5.4)	31.6 (−0.2)	39.8 (4.3)	45.1 (7.3)	43.7 (6.5)	33.2 (0.7)	22.0 (−5.6)	9.9 (−12.3)	−2.4 (−19.1)	21.1 (−6.1)
Mean minimum °F (°C)	−24.5 (−31.4)	−21.8 (−29.9)	−4.9 (−20.5)	11.6 (−11.3)	18.7 (−7.4)	29.0 (−1.7)	37.1 (2.8)	34.3 (1.3)	22.6 (−5.2)	9.4 (−12.6)	−9.2 (−22.9)	−20.2 (−29.0)	−28.5 (−33.6)
Record low °F (°C)	−49 (−45)	−47 (−44)	−31 (−35)	−24 (−31)	5 (−15)	19 (−7)	25 (−4)	21 (−6)	7 (−14)	−15 (−26)	−34 (−37)	−52 (−47)	−52 (−47)
Average precipitation inches (mm)	0.34 (8.6)	0.29 (7.4)	0.47 (12)	0.79 (20)	1.47 (37)	1.05 (27)	0.54 (14)	0.73 (19)	0.85 (22)	0.61 (15)	0.32 (8.1)	0.37 (9.4)	7.83 (199.5)
Average snowfall inches (cm)	4.8 (12)	5.1 (13)	4.9 (12)	4.1 (10)	0.4 (1.0)	0.0 (0.0)	0.0 (0.0)	0.0 (0.0)	0.1 (0.25)	1.1 (2.8)	3.3 (8.4)	4.6 (12)	28.4 (71.45)
Average precipitation days (≥ 0.01 in)	3.1	3.3	3.5	4.7	6.0	4.1	3.1	3.7	4.1	3.2	2.5	3.2	44.5
Average snowy days (≥ 0.1 in)	3.2	3.0	2.6	2.1	0.3	0.0	0.0	0.0	0.0	0.9	1.9	2.9	16.9
Source 1: NOAA
Source 2: National Weather Service

== Education ==
Public education in the community of Farson is provided by Sweetwater County School District #1. Farson-Eden School, a K-12 campus, serves the community. The majority of the students enrolled reside in either Farson or Eden; however, there is a bus that transports students from nearby Rock Springs.

Farson has a public library, a branch of the Sweetwater County Library System.

== See also ==
- List of census-designated places in Wyoming
