= Alcova Dam =

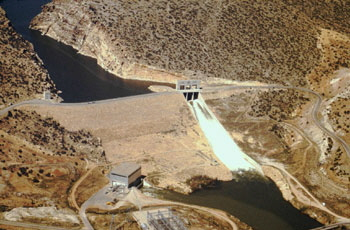
- Alcova Dam
- Interactive map of Alcova Dam
- Country: United States
- Location: Natrona County, Wyoming, USA
- Coordinates: 42°32′53″N 106°43′10″W
- Construction began: 1935
- Opening date: 1938
- Operator: U.S. Bureau of Reclamation

Dam and spillways
- Type of dam: Zoned earthfill
- Impounds: North Platte River
- Height: 265 feet (81 m)
- Length: 763 feet (233 m)
- Dam volume: 1,635,000 cu yd (1,250,000 m^{3})
- Spillway type: Gated spillway
- Spillway capacity: 55,000 cu ft/s (1,600 m^{3}/s)

Reservoir
- Creates: Alcova Reservoir
- Total capacity: 184,405 acre-feet (0.227460 km^{3})
- Normal elevation: 5,502 ft (1,677 m)

Power Station
- Hydraulic head: 180 ft (55 m)
- Turbines: 2 x 18 MW Francis turbines
- Installed capacity: 36 MW
- Annual generation: 92,408,000 KWh

Alcova Dam (National ID # WY01290) is a 265-foot (81 m) tall zoned earthfill dam in central Wyoming, built in 1935-38 on the North Platte River and operated by the U.S. Bureau of Reclamation for water storage and hydroelectric power generation. The dam was built as part of the Kendrick Project, formerly the Casper-Alcova Project, whose central features are Alcova and Seminoe dams.

Alcova Powerplant comprises two generating units, each 18 MW. The reservoir's capacity is 184,405 acre-feet (0.227460 km^{3}), but only 30,606 acre-feet (0.037752 km^{3}) may be used for irrigation.

== History ==
Alcova Dam bridge
- Coordinates: 42°32′53″N 106°43′08″W
- Carries: Cottonwood Avenue

Location
- Interactive map of Alcova Dam bridge

Alcova Canyon was first surveyed for potential damsites in 1903. In 1921 a dam was proposed at Alcova to divert water to Casper, irrigating 60,000 acres (24,000 ha). The project was authorized in 1933, with $15,000,000 allocated by 1936. Initially titled the Casper-Alcova Project, the effort was renamed the Kendrick Project in 1937 to honor Wyoming senator John B. Kendrick. Work on a diversion tunnel began in 1933. Work on the dam started in 1935, carried out by a joint venture of W.E. Callahan Construction of Dallas, Texas, and Gunther and Shirley of Los Angeles, California. Earthfill placement started in 1936.and was completed in 1937. The reservoir was filled in 1938, with final completion of the dam on May 8, 1938. The powerplant was not started until 1952, completed three years later.

== Geology ==
Alcova Dam is situated within an anticline; a Laramide-age fold located on the southeastern margin of the Wind River Basin. The North Platte River has carved a deep canyon directly through the axis of this anticline, exposing vertical walls of ancient sedimentary rock. The dam itself is anchored in a narrow gap where the river sliced through resistant rock ridges. In the immediate vicinity of the dam, the rock layers generally dip toward the northeast or east at angles ranging from 9° to 13°. The rock in this area is Tensleep sandstone and Alcova limestone, a member of the Chugwater Formation.
