= Pilot Butte Dam =

Dam in Wyoming, United States

Coordinates: 43°11′44″N 108°45′21″W

Pilot Butte Dam (National ID # WY01381) is a dam in Fremont County, Wyoming.

The earthen dam was constructed in 1926 by the United States Bureau of Reclamation, with a height of 64 feet (19.5 km), and a length of 55 feet (16.8 km) at its crest. It provides offstream storage for flood control and irrigation water as part of the larger Riverton unit of the extensive Pick–Sloan Missouri Basin Program. The dam is owned by the Bureau, and operated by the Midvale Irrigation District.

The reservoir it creates, Pilot Butte Reservoir, has a normal water surface of 1.4 square miles (3.6 km^{2}), and a maximum capacity of 36,900 acre-feet. Recreation includes fishing (for trout, ling, and crappie, etc.), hunting, boating, camping and hiking.
