= Kortes Dam =

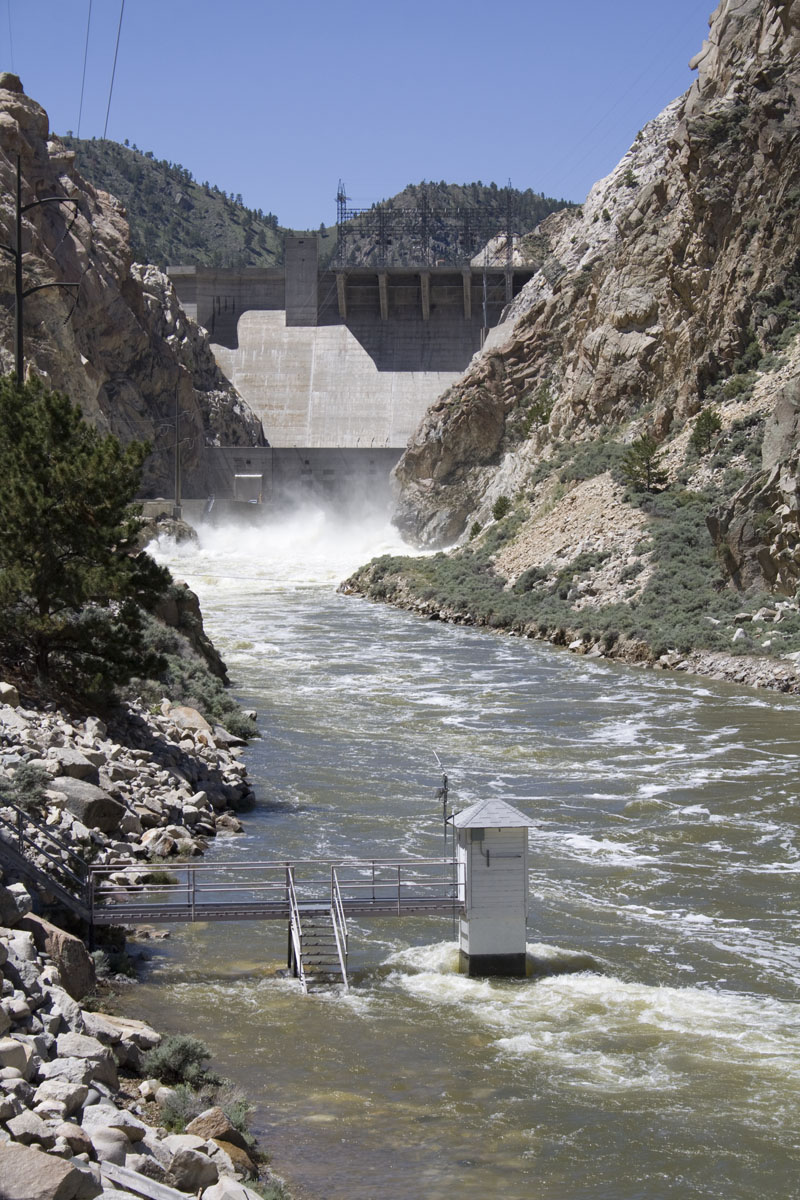

- Location of Kortes Dam in Wyoming
- Country: United States
- Location: Carbon County, Wyoming
- Coordinates: 42°10′27″N 106°52′52″W
- Status: In use
- Construction began: 1946
- Opening date: 1951
- Owner: U.S. Bureau of Reclamation

Dam and spillways
- Impounds: North Platte River
- Height: 244 ft (74 m)
- Length: 440 ft (130 m)

Reservoir
- Creates: Kortes Reservoir
- Total capacity: 4,765 acre⋅ft (5,878,000 m^{3})
- Surface area: 83 acres (34 ha)
- Maximum water depth: 200 ft (61 m)
- Normal elevation: 6,145 ft (1,873 m)

Kortes Dam (National ID # WY01294) is a dam in Carbon County, Wyoming.

The concrete gravity dam was constructed between 1946 and 1951 by the United States Bureau of Reclamation, with a height of 244 feet (74 m), and a length of 440 feet (130 m) at its crest. It impounds the North Platte River for hydroelectric power. Owned and operated by the Bureau, it stands as part of the Kortes Unit of the vast Pick–Sloan Missouri Basin Program less than two miles downstream from the Bureau's larger Seminoe Dam.

The riverine reservoir it creates, Kortes Reservoir, has a water surface of 83 acres (34 ha) and a volume of 4,765 acre-feet (5,878,000 m^{3}) confined to the narrow Black Canyon, which is not stocked with fish and has no boat ramp facilities. However, the five and a half river miles from the base of Kortes Dam downstream to the Pathfinder Reservoir, the Miracle Mile Area, has eleven primitive camping areas and fishing for brown trout, cutthroat trout, rainbow trout, and walleye.
