= Meeks Cabin Dam =

Reservoir in the state of Utah, United States

Coordinates: 41°01′32″N 110°34′49″W

Meeks Cabin Dam (National ID # WY01390) is a dam on the Blacks Fork of the Green River, located in Uinta County, southwestern Wyoming. It impounds Meeks Cabin Reservoir, which is mostly in Wyoming, with a portion extending south over the state line into Utah.

== Dam ==
The earthen dam was constructed from 1966 through 1971 by the United States Bureau of Reclamation, with a height of 185 feet (56 m) and 3,162 feet (964 m) long at its crest. It is primarily for irrigation water storage.

The dam is owned by the Bureau of Reclamation, part of their larger regional Lyman Project, and is operated by the Bridger Valley Water Conservancy District.

== Meeks Cabin Reservoir ==
The Meeks Cabin Reservoir has a surface area of 470 acres (190 ha) and a maximum capacity of 32,470 acre-feet (40,050,000 m^{3}) and an elevation of 8,602 feet (2,622 m).

Recreation at the reservoir includes fishing (for cutthroat trout and whitefish), camping, hiking, hunting, and boating. It is within the Wasatch-Cache National Forest, under the jurisdiction of the United States Forest Service.
