= Seminoe Dam =

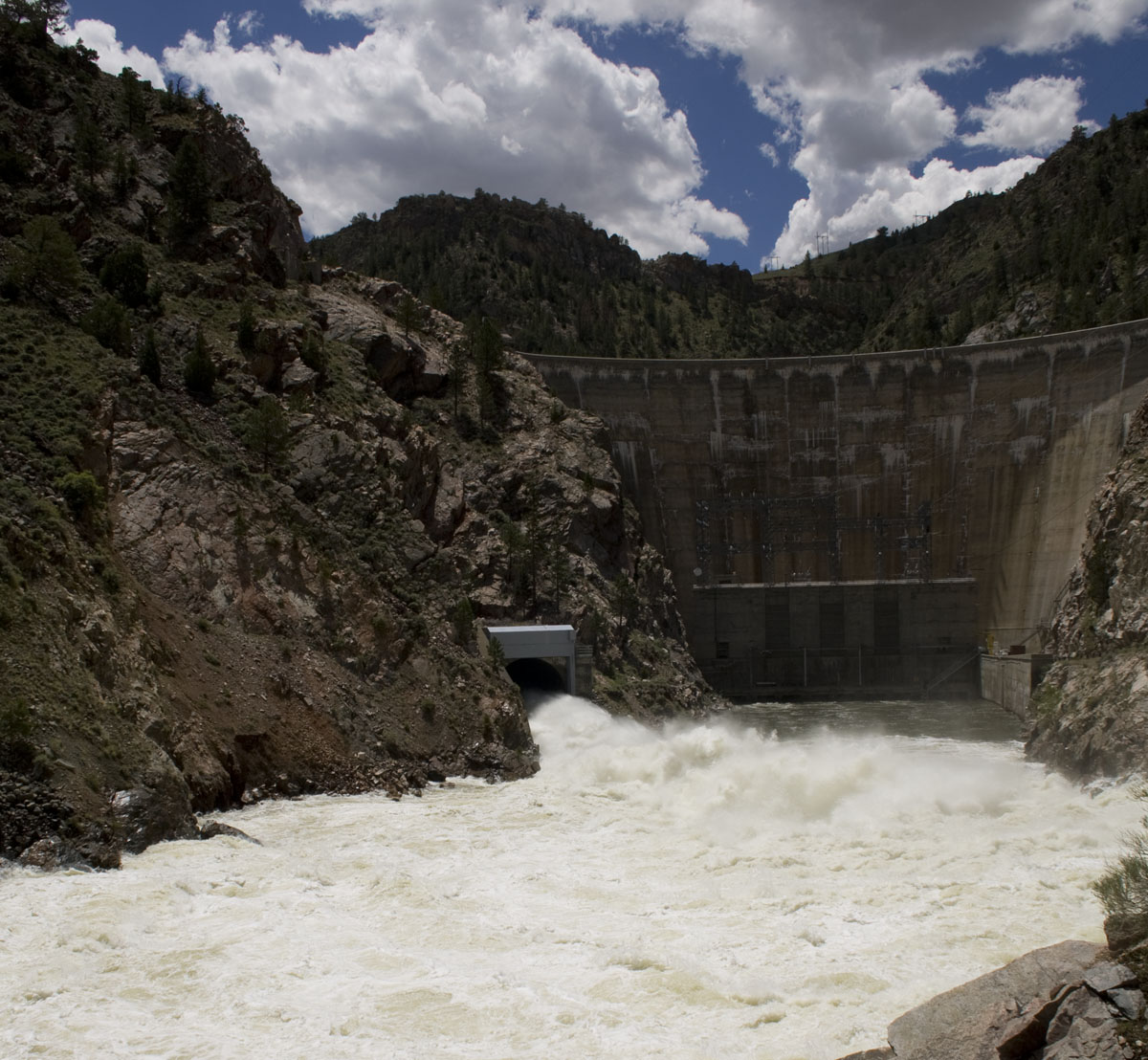
- Spillways full open following heavy snowmelt, June 2011

- Location of Seminoe Dam in Wyoming
- Country: United States
- Location: Carbon County, Wyoming
- Coordinates: 42°09′21″N 106°54′30″W
- Status: In use
- Construction began: 1936
- Opening date: 1939
- Owner: U.S. Bureau of Reclamation

Dam and spillways
- Type of dam: Concrete thick gravity-arch
- Impounds: North Platte River
- Height: 295 ft (90 m)
- Length: 530 ft (160 m)
- Width (crest): 15 ft (4.6 m)
- Width (base): 85 ft (26 m)
- Dam volume: 210,000 yd^{3} (160,000 m^{3})
- Spillways: 1
- Spillway type: Gated concrete tunnel
- Spillway capacity: 48,500 cu ft/s (1,370 m^{3}/s)

Reservoir
- Creates: Seminoe Reservoir
- Total capacity: 1,017,279 acre⋅ft (1.254795×10^{9} m^{3})
- Catchment area: 7,210 mi^{2} (18,700 km^{2})
- Surface area: 20,291 acres (8,211 ha)
- Maximum water depth: 206 ft (63 m)
- Normal elevation: 6,362 ft (1,939 m)

Power Station
- Hydraulic head: 166 ft (51 m)
- Turbines: 3x 15 MW
- Installed capacity: 45 MW
- Annual generation: 96,406,970 KWh (2007)

Seminoe Dam is a concrete thick-arch dam on the North Platte River in the U.S. state of Wyoming. The dam stores water for irrigation and hydroelectricity generation and is owned and operated by the U.S. Bureau of Reclamation. It is the uppermost dam on the North Platte River and is located directly upstream from the Kortes Dam. It lies in a narrow, isolated canyon formed by the North Platte cutting through the Seminoe Mountains about 40 miles (64 km) northeast of Rawlins. The 295-foot (90 m) dam forms Seminoe Reservoir, which covers more than 20,000 acres (8,100 ha) when full. Seminoe State Park is adjacent to the reservoir. The small village of Seminoe Dam abuts the dam and reservoir and provides residence for the dam attendants and park services personnel.

== History ==
This dam was first proposed in the 1930s as part of the Bureau of Reclamation's Kendrick Project, which would regulate the flow of the North Platte River in order to improve agriculture in the valleys surrounding Casper, Wyoming. Originally known as the Casper-Alcova Project, it was authorized by the National Industrial Recovery Act on June 16, 1933 in response to the Great Depression. The project was renamed the Kendrick Project on August 9, 1937 in honor of Wyoming politician John B. Kendrick.

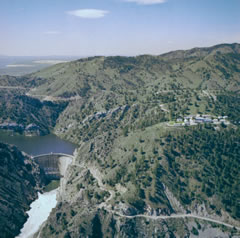
Seminoe Dam and Reservoir from the air

In 1934, Winston Brothers Company and Associates won the construction contract for Seminoe Dam. Groundbreaking of the site was on February 20, 1936, with preliminary blasting and excavations. The diversion tunnel for the North Platte was completed on January 17, 1937, with one fatality, and by May of that year, a cofferdam was completed to a sufficient height to divert the river into the new channel. Concrete pouring began on January 19, 1938, and the last bucket was emptied on December 21, 1938. Water storage began on April 2, 1939, when the outlet tunnels were closed. The dam's power station was finished and the entire project was declared operational on August 3, 1939. A total of two deaths and several serious injuries resulted from the construction, and a pair of active faults that cut across the canyon near the dam site had to be excavated and filled in.

On March 25, 1969, a helicopter experienced engine problems and crashed into the rocky canyon near Seminoe dam killing Bureau of Reclamation employees David McMillan and Howard Leroy Gates. (Altoona Mirror, April 21, 1969)

When the project was first completed, it delivered water to just 600 acres (240 ha), but has progressed steadily, and by 1980 supplied irrigation water to 22,581 acres (9,138 ha) in the Casper valley.

A $2.5 billion 900 MW / 9 GWh (10-hour) pumped-storage hydroelectricity plant is scheduled to use Seminoe reservoir as the lower reservoir, and a new dam and reservoir as the upper.

== Recreation ==
The Seminoe Reservoir is stocked with fish by the Wyoming Game and Fish Commission, and is open to boating and fishing, although access to the shoreline is limited and sometimes difficult due to the lack of development and distance from major cities.

== See also ==
- List of largest reservoirs of Wyoming
