= Guernsey Dam =

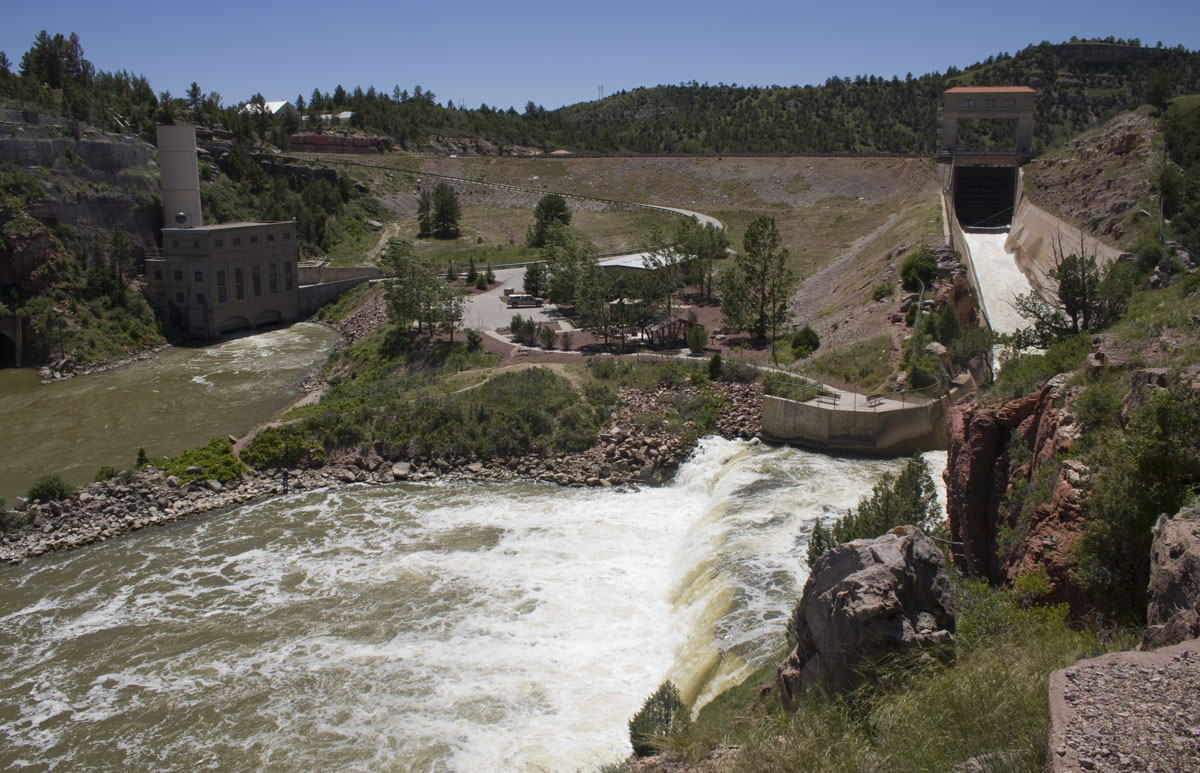

- Location of Guernsey Dam in Wyoming Guernsey Dam (the United States)
- Country: United States
- Location: Platte County, Wyoming, USA
- Coordinates: 42°17′25″N 104°45′49″W
- Construction began: 1925
- Opening date: 1928
- Operator: U.S. Bureau of Reclamation

Dam and spillways
- Impounds: North Platte River
- Height: 135 feet (41 m)
- Length: 560 feet (170 m)

Reservoir
- Creates: Guernsey Reservoir
- Total capacity: 71,040 acre⋅ft (87,630,000 m^{3})
- Normal elevation: 4,423 ft (1,348 m)

Guernsey Dam is an earthfill dam on the North Platte River in Platte County in the U.S. State of Wyoming. The dam creates Guernsey Reservoir, the last of the 5 major reservoirs on the North Platte River in Wyoming. The dam contains a hydroelectric plant capable of producing 6.4 megawatts of electricity. The total capacity of the reservoir is 71,040 acre-feet (87,630,000 m^{3}) of water which is used mainly for irrigation. Morrison-Knudsen (Now URS Corporation) and Utah Construction Company constructed Guernsey Dam and the hydroelectric plant as part of the North Platte Project to provide irrigation to eastern Wyoming and western Nebraska. Guernsey helps control the river flow and stores water released from the project's primary storage upstream at Pathfinder Reservoir. About 8 miles (13 km) downstream of the dam, the Whalen Diversion Dam diverts water into the Fort Laramie and Interstate Canals that service farms in Wyoming and Nebraska.

The reservoir is surrounded by Guernsey State Park.

== History ==
President Calvin Coolidge authorized the Dam on April 30, 1925, as part of a larger project involving the North Platte. Residents had been advocating for the dam as early as 1915, to provide hydroelectricity. It would take another decade for the project to move forward in May 1925. As many as 200 laborers were employed to move earth and rock from the surrounding canyon to create the 135 feet (41 m) dam. It was completed in 1927, and the power plant a year later. In 1934, the Civilian Conservation Corps established two camps at the reservoir with the intent of developing recreation sites at Guernsey Reservoir. They constructed an overlook, museum, and shelters using local sandstone. Some of the structures are on the National Register of Historic Places.

== See also ==
- List of largest reservoirs of Wyoming
