= Pathfinder =

Pathfinder, Path Finder or Pathfinders may refer to:

== Aerospace ==
- The Mars Pathfinder, a NASA Mars Lander
- NASA Pathfinder, a high-altitude, solar-powered uncrewed aircraft
- Space Shuttle Pathfinder, a Space Shuttle test simulator

== Arts and entertainment ==
=== Fictional characters ===
- Pathfinder, a G.I. Joe: A Real American Hero character
- Path Finder (Transformers), an animated television series character
- Pathfinder, in the battle royale game Apex Legends
- The Pathfinder, a call sign for the alien character John Adams in the 2011 video game Conduit 2
- Pathfinder Ryder, the player character in Mass Effect: Andromeda

=== Film and television ===
- The Pathfinder (1952 film), based on the book by James Fenimore Cooper
- Pathfinder (1987 film), a Norwegian Oscar-nominated film
- The Pathfinder (1996 film), a TV movie based on the book by James Fenimore Cooper
- Pathfinder (2007 film), an action film based on the 1987 film
- Pathfinders (TV series), a 1972–1973 British television series
- "Pathfinder" (Star Trek: Voyager), a television series episode

=== Games ===
- Pathfinder Roleplaying Game
  - Pathfinder (periodicals), a series of supplements to the game
  - Pathfinder: Kingmaker, a computer game based in this fictional universe
  - Pathfinder: Wrath of the Righteous, a computer game sequel to Kingmaker
- Pathfinder, a 1977 Milton Bradley Company board game
- "Pathfinder", a The Price Is Right pricing game

=== Music ===
- Pathfinder (band), a Polish symphonic power metal band
- Pathfinder (album), a 1972 Beggars Opera album
- Path.Finder, a 2019 Notaker EP

=== Novels ===
- The Pathfinder, or The Inland Sea, an 1840 novel by James Fenimore Cooper
- Pathfinders (novel), 1944, by Cecil Lewis
- Pathfinder (novel), 2010, by Orson Scott Card
- TodHunter Moon, Book One: PathFinder, a 2014 novel by Angie Sage

== Businesses ==
- Pathfinder Energy Services, a division of Smith International
- Pathfinder Press, a publisher of socialist literature

== Computing and information science ==
- Path Finder, a Macintosh file browser
- Pathfinder (library science), a subject bibliography often offered on library websites
- Pathfinder (website), owned by Time Inc.
- Pathfinder network, a psychometric scaling method
- Java Pathfinder, a software testing tool

== Military ==
- Pathfinder (military), a type of soldier
- Pathfinder (RAF), British target-marking squadrons during World War II
- Pathfinder (USAAF), American radar-equipped bombers during World War II
- Pathfinders Company (Portugal), a Portuguese military unit
- Pathfinder Platoon, a British military unit
- HMS Pathfinder, several Royal Navy ships
- Pathfinder-class cruiser, a two-ship Royal Navy class
- USS Pathfinder, several U.S. Navy ships
- Pathfinder-class survey ship, a class of U.S. Navy ship
- Piasecki 16H Pathfinder, an experimental series of helicopters produced in the 1960s for the US Army
- 8th Infantry Division (United States), nicknamed "Pathfinder"

== Organizations ==
- Pathfinders (Girl Guides), a division of the Girl Guides of Canada
- Pathfinders (Seventh-day Adventist), a youth organization
- Pathfinder International, an American reproductive health organization

== Places ==
- Pathfinder National Wildlife Refuge, Wyoming, US
- Pathfinder Dam, on the North Platte River, Wyoming
  - Pathfinder Reservoir, Wyoming
- Camp Pathfinder, a boys' camp in Ontario, Canada

== Transportation ==
=== Aircraft ===
- Keystone Pathfinder, a 1920s airliner, built only as a prototype
- Pathfinder, the marketing name of the Piper PA-28 Cherokee, a light, piston-powered aircraft from 1974 to 1977
- Soloy Pathfinder 21, a twin-engined, single propeller turboprop aircraft

=== Road vehicles ===
- Pathfinder (1912 automobile)
- LUTZ Pathfinder, the UK's first autonomous car, shown to the public in 2015
- Nissan Pathfinder, a sport utility vehicle introduced in 1986
- Pontiac Pathfinder, an American automobile produced from 1953 to 1958
- Riley Pathfinder, a British automobile produced from 1953 to 1957
- Wright Pathfinder, a bus body

=== Other transportation ===
- S.T.V. Pathfinder, a Canadian sail-training vessel
- Pathfinder Parkway, an Oklahoma walking, jogging and biking trail

== Other uses ==
- Pathfinder March, an annual 46-mile (74 km) walk connecting all the RAF Pathfinder air stations from the Second World War
- Pathfinder Nuclear Generating Station, a former power plant near Sioux Falls, South Dakota, US
- Charter Arms Pathfinder, a revolver
- Pathfinder Camera, an instant camera made by Polaroid
- Milton Keynes Pathfinders, an American football team based in Milton Keynes, England
- Adenocaulon bicolor, a flowering plant in the daisy family known as Pathfinder
- Ulmus parvifolia 'Pathfinder', a Chinese Elm cultivar
- Housing Market Renewal Initiative, a UK programme, also referred to as Pathfinder
- The Pathfinder (drink), a hemp-based drink

== See also ==
- Matthew Fontaine Maury (1806–1873), Navy Commander, oceanographer, educator, author nicknamed "Pathfinder of the Seas"
- John C. Frémont (1813–1890), Frontier army military officer, topographer, explorer nicknamed "The Pathfinder"
- Pathfinding, as in algorithms for finding a route
- Sakigake (translated into English as "Pathfinder" or "Pioneer"), Japan's first interplanetary spacecraft
- Sperrbrecher, a category of auxiliary warships used by the German Kriegsmarine during World War II, sometimes called Pathfinder
- Wolf pack Pfadfinder (German for "pathfinder"), a German World War II wolf pack in the Battle of the Atlantic
- An isogram, of which "pathfinder" is an example that can be used as a numerical cipher
