= Sweetwater Arch =

Landform in Wyoming, United States

- Sweetwater Uplift

Geography
- Country: United States
- State: Wyoming
- Region(s): Natrona, Carbon, and Fremont counties
- Parent range: Rocky Mountains
- Borders on: Wind River Basin (north), Shirley Basin (east), Great Divide Basin (south)

Geology
- Orogeny: Laramide orogeny
- Rock age(s): Precambrian (core), Cretaceous–Paleogene (uplift)
- Rock type(s): Granite, Metamorphic, Sedimentary

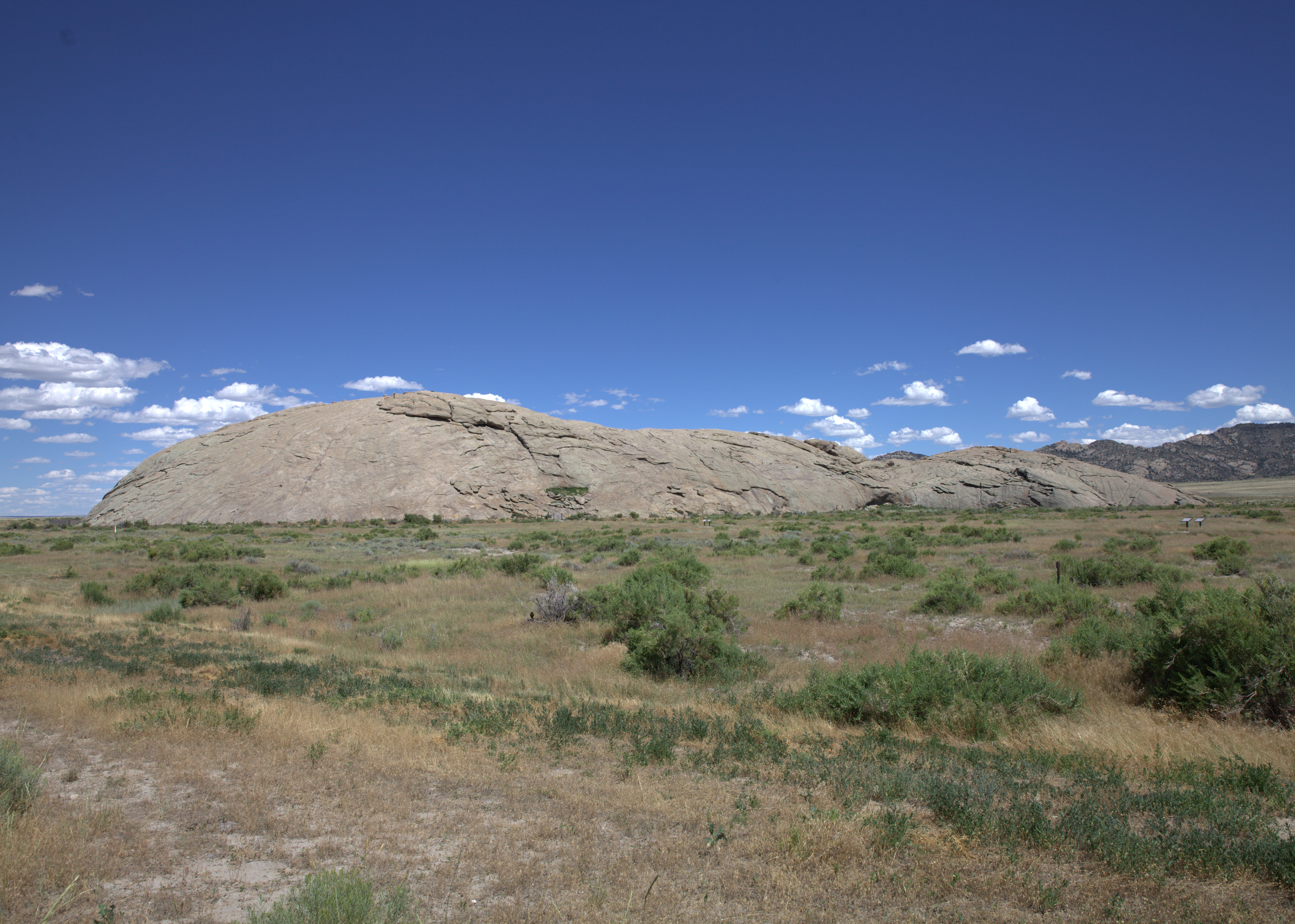
Independence Rock is an inselberg feature of the Sweetwater Arch

The Sweetwater Arch is a west-to-west-northwest trending, basement-cored tectonic uplift located in central Wyoming. Part of the Laramide orogeny (approximately 70–50 million years ago), the arch is characterized by a "thick-skinned" structural style where ancient Precambrian basement rocks were thrust upward through younger sedimentary layers. While many Laramide arches remain topographically high (like the Wind River Range), the Sweetwater Arch is unique because its central core, the Granite Mountains, largely subsided during the Late Cenozoic, leaving only isolated granite peaks (inselbergs) visible today.

The arch formed due to intense horizontal compression of the North American plate. Massive blocks of 2.6 to 2.8 billion-year-old Archean granite were pushed southwestward along the Emigrant Trail thrust fault. At its peak, the arch was a formidable mountain range, contributing massive amounts of sediment to the surrounding Wind River and Powder River basins.

The Sweetwater Arch underwent a dramatic structural reversal starting in the Miocene (roughly 15–10 million years ago). The crest of the arch began to drop along normal faults, forming the Granite Mountains graben. This subsidence was so significant that the core of the mountains "sank" 400–600 meters relative to its flanks, and the area was largely buried by volcanic ash and fluvial sediments of the Split Rock and Moonstone Formations.

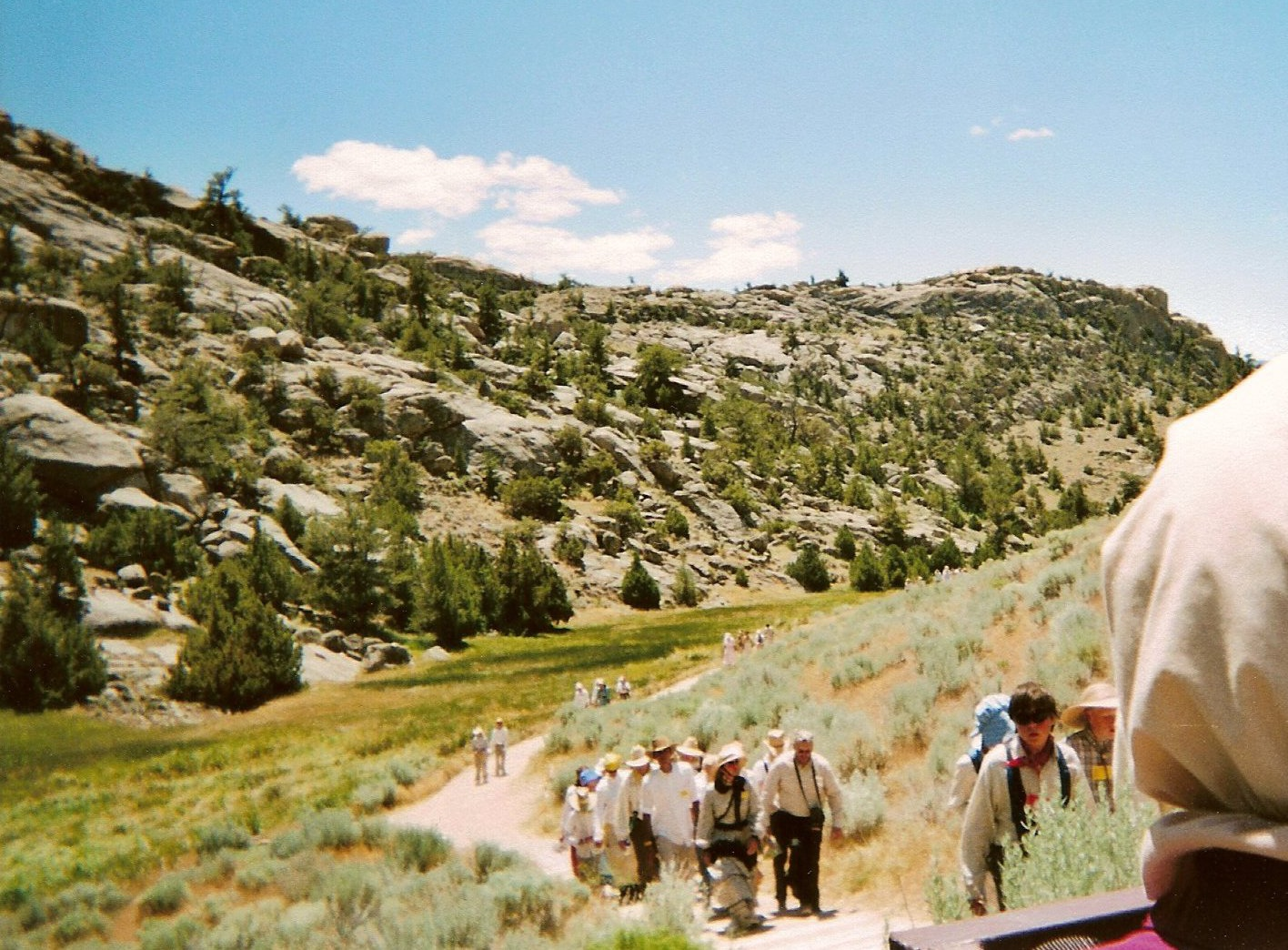
Martin's Cove served as a landmark on the Oregon, Mormon, and California trails

Because the Sweetwater Arch created a relatively level "pathway" through the mountains via the Sweetwater River valley, it became the primary route for the Oregon, Mormon, and California Trails. Independence Rock stood as the most famous landmark along this geological corridor. Martin's Cove, also nearby, was a landmark on the Oregon Trail. The river valley near Martin's Cove is a classic example of "superposition." As the Sweetwater Arch subsided and was buried in volcanic ash, the Sweetwater River flowed over the top of the debris. As the river cut back down through the landscape, it became "trapped" in the hard granite, carving narrow gaps like nearby Devil's Gate and forming the sheltered cove.

== See also ==
- Independence Rock - an inselberg in the Sweetwater Arch.
- Martin's Cove - a cove near Independence Rock.
- Devil's Gate - a small gorge cut through the rock by the Sweetwater River.
- Split Rock - another inselberg like Independence Rock, with a distinct split granite feature.
