= Moonstone Formation =

Geologic formation in Wyoming, United States

- Stratigraphic range: Late Miocene to Early Pliocene
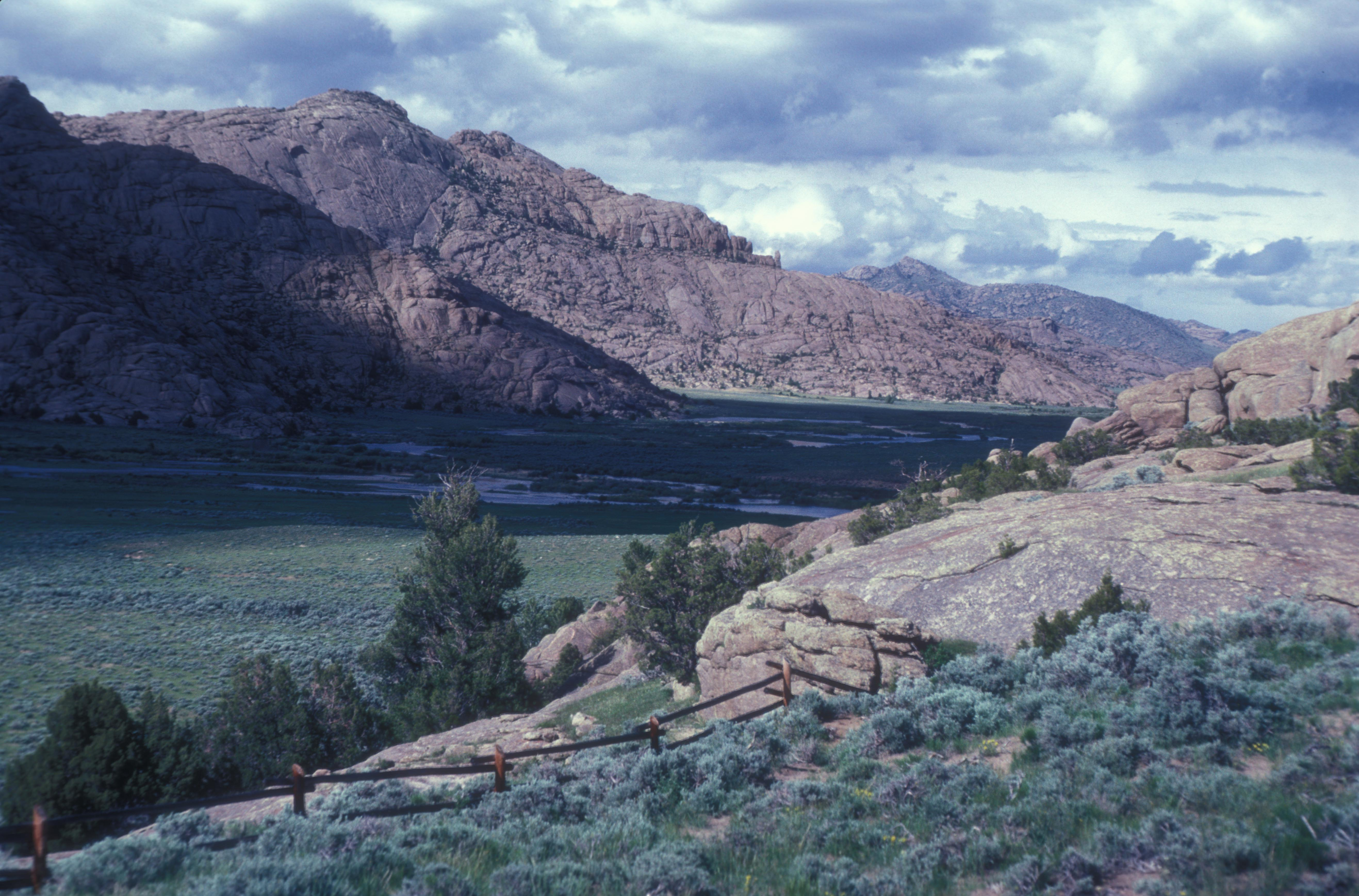
- Type: Formation
- Thickness: Up to 400 metres (1,300 ft)

Lithology
- Primary: Sandstone, shale, claystone, limestone, tuff

Location
- Location: Granite Mountains, Wyoming, US
- Coordinates: 42°28′N 107°30′W

The Moonstone Formation is a geological formation of late Cenozoic age, consisting of approximately 400 meters of fluvial (river-related) and lacustrine (lake-related) deposits. It is best known for mantling the Precambrian granites of the Sweetwater Arch in central Wyoming. The formation is significant for its rich vertebrate fossil record and its role in dating the subsidence and faulting that shaped the modern Wyoming landscape.

== Stratigraphy and Age ==
The Moonstone Formation unconformably overlies the lower to middle Miocene Split Rock Formation. While early studies in the 1960s tentatively assigned it a Pliocene age, modern radiometric dating and mammalian biochronology have refined its placement to the late Miocene (late Barstovian to early Hemphillian ages). U-Pb zircon dating of interbedded volcanic ashes within the formation has yielded precise ages of approximately 8.39 to .24 Ma. This indicates that the formation was deposited between roughly 11.4 and 6 million years ago. The formation occurred as the Seetwater Arch subsided, forming an east to west syncline. Faulting in the region created the nearby Seminoe and Ferris Mountains to the south.

== Lithology ==
The Moonstone formation is composed of sedimentary and volcanic rocks, including sandstone, shale, claystone, limestone, volcanic ash, and chaledony.

== Paleontology ==
Various fossils have been found in the formation. Some of those include extinct: sabertooth cats, cricetid rodents, rabbits, and beaver. Black shale in the formation contains pollen and megaspores, indicating its age in the late Clarendonian period.

== See also ==
- Split Rock, which has evidence of the formation.
