= Split Rock (Wyoming) =

- Split Rock, Twin Peaks
- U.S. National Register of Historic Places
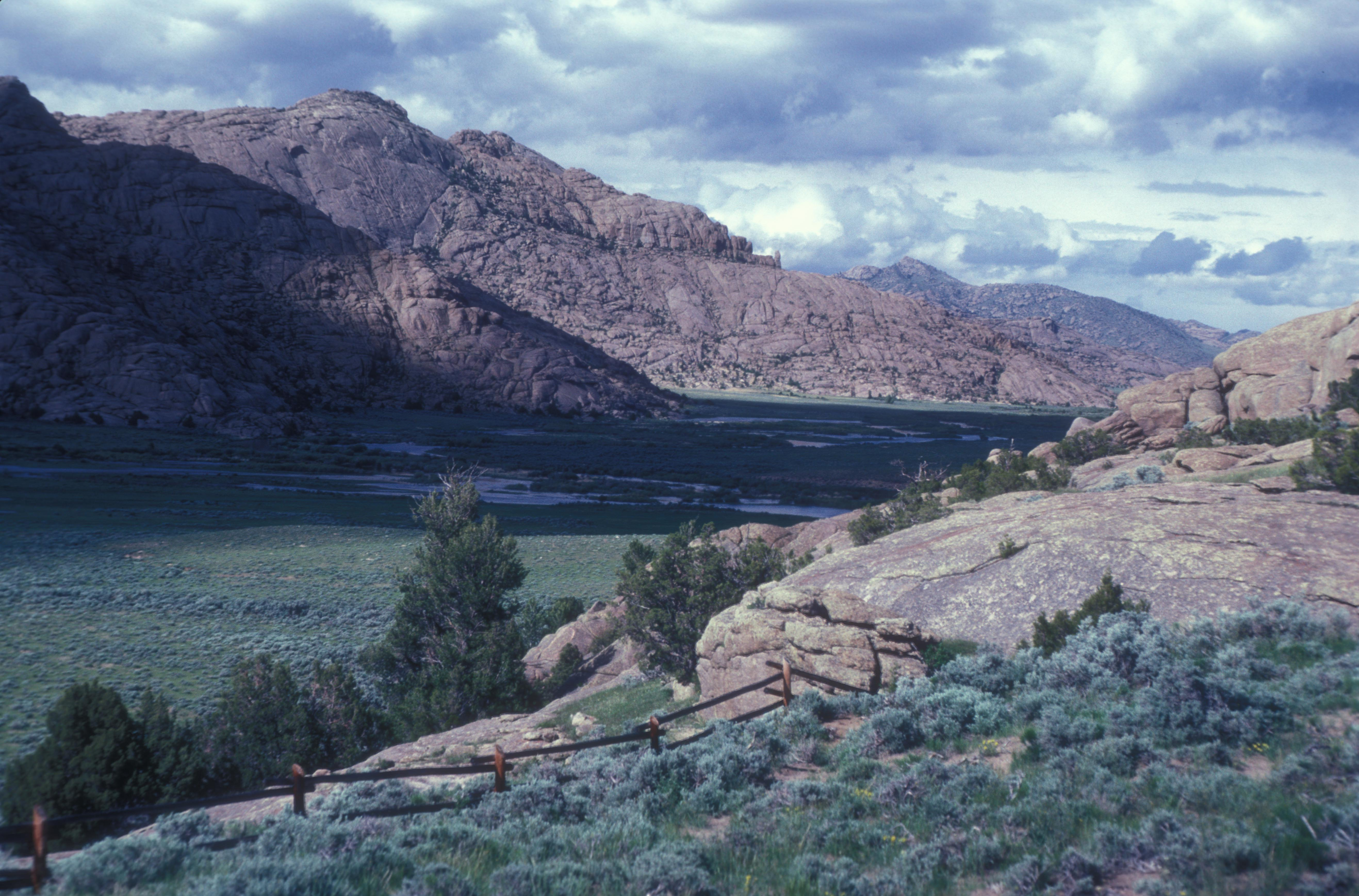

- Location within Wyoming Location within the United States
- Nearest city: Muddy Gap, Wyoming
- Coordinates: 42°28′51″N 107°31′44″W
- Area: less than one acre
- NRHP reference No.: 76001959
- Added to NRHP: December 22, 1976

Split Rock, also known as Twin Peaks, is a mountain in the Granite Mountains of central Wyoming. The peak has an elevation of 7,305 feet (2,227 m), and is located about 10 miles (16 km) north of the Muddy Gap junction between Casper and Rawlins. The mountain is distinctive for a deep V-shaped cleft dividing its summit. The mountain was a prominent landmark on the Oregon Trail and other early settlement routes in the region, which crossed a low rise at the eastern end of the range between Casper and the North Platte River valley and the Sweetwater River.

The mountain summit was listed on the National Register of Historic Places in 1976 for its historic significance.

== Geology ==
Fifty million years ago, the Sweetwater River Valley and the Granite Range began to form. The range was created as a segment of the Rocky Mountains. Then, fifteen million years ago, the area dropped downward, creating a bowl. The erosion of the surrounding highlands accumulated to 3,000 feet (910 m). As the area continued downward, ‘Moonstone Lake’ formed about ten million years ago. It was large, shallow, and briny, adding 1,500 feet (460 m) of sediments, with some uranium concentrations. The erosion stripped the surrounding high points, exposing the Granite Range.

The Continental Divide follows the southern rim of the basin, encompassing the Wind River and Sweetwater Valleys, following the crest of the Wind River Range, with the eastward extension including (east to west) the Ferris Mountains, Green Mountains, Crooks Mountain and the Antelope Hills. There are a few breaks in this range of mountains, i.e., Muddy Gap, Crooks Gap, and the broad slope called South Pass. This extended valley is a natural ramp built from the sands of ancient Moonstone Lake. The Sweetwater serpentines through the eastern basin as a clear mountain stream. It has easy slopes, fresh water, and abundant grass. By pack train, wagon, or handcart, the nineteenth-century emigrant sought as direct a route as possible through the Great Plains and Rocky Mountains. The Sweetwater segment begins near the Alcova Reservoir, leaving the valley of the North Platte River. After 100 miles (160 km) it exits through South Pass.

== History ==
The Sweetwater River Valley is a break in the Rocky Mountain chain. It thus provides a major east-west overland route through the Rocky Mountains. This route was used by fur trappers, goldseekers, homeseekers, merchants, and troopers. They rode horseback, in wagons, walked, or pulled and pushed handcarts from 1812 to 1912.

In the early 19th century, the Astorians under Robert Stuart established a route to the mouth of the Columbia River to support the North American fur trade. Segments of this path later contributed to the development of major overland routes, including the California Trail, the Oregon Trail, and the Mormon Pioneer Trail. Before 1812, portions of these trails were used by High Plains American Indians following migratory herds of buffalo or other game animals. By 1912, these historic travel routes were largely supplanted by railroads, and then the automobile and airplane replaced the wagon trail.

== See also ==
- National Register of Historic Places listings in Natrona County, Wyoming
