= Pathfinder Dam =

Dam in Wyoming, United States

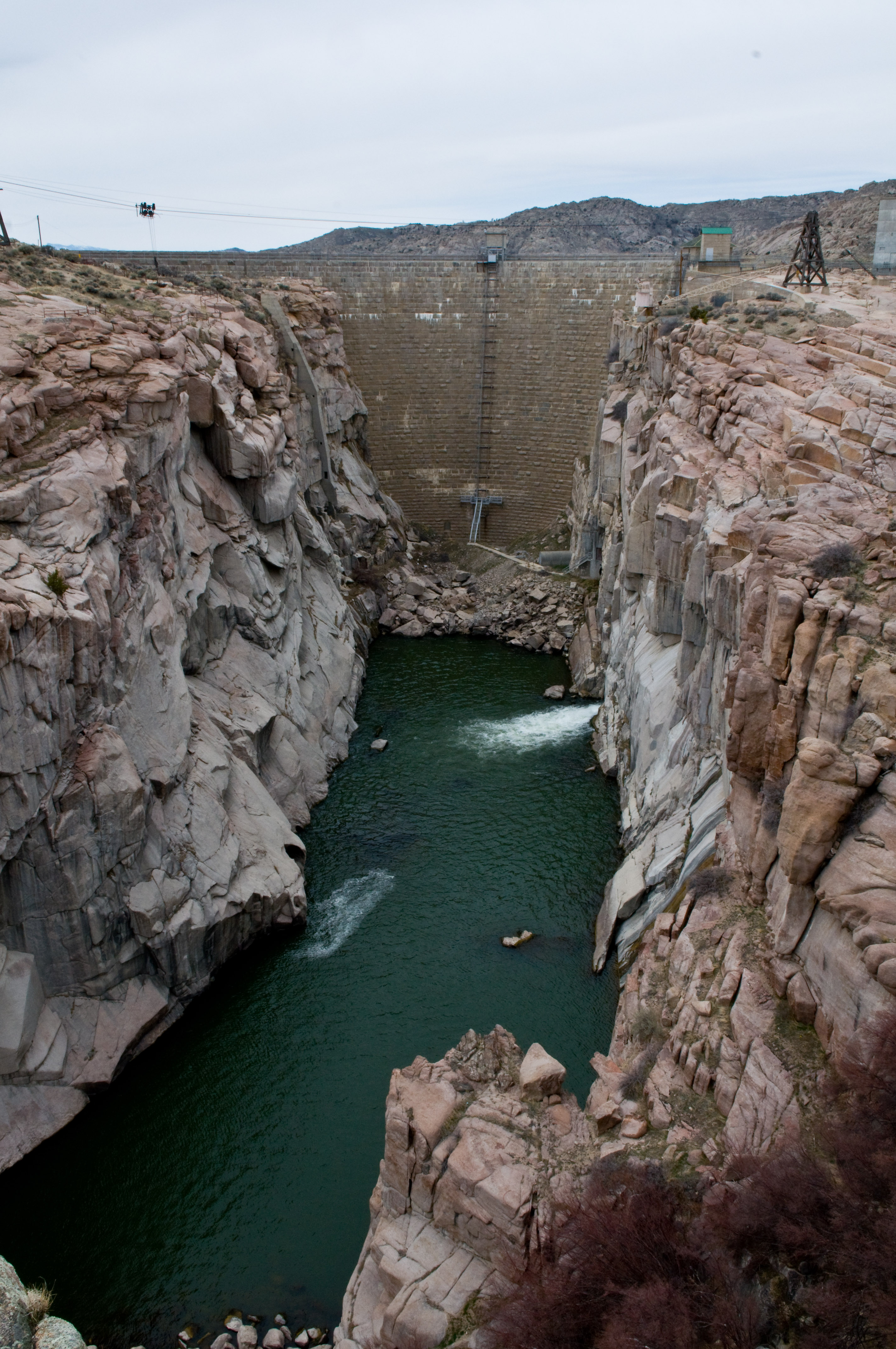
- Pathfinder Dam
- Interactive map of Pathfinder Dam
- Location: Natrona County, Wyoming, USA
- Coordinates: 42°28′05″N 106°51′14″W
- Construction began: 1905
- Opening date: 1909
- Operator: U.S. Bureau of Reclamation

Dam and spillways
- Type of dam: Cyclopean masonry gravity arch
- Impounds: North Platte River
- Height: 214 feet (65 m)
- Length: 432 feet (132 m)
- Width (crest): 10.5 feet (3.2 m)
- Width (base): 96.5 feet (29.4 m)
- Dam volume: 65,700 cu yd (50,200 m^{3})
- Spillway type: Uncontrolled natural channel
- Spillway capacity: 33,940 cu ft/s (961 m^{3}/s)

Reservoir
- Creates: Pathfinder Reservoir
- Total capacity: 1,016,500 acre-feet (1.2538 km^{3})
- Catchment area: 14,600 sq mi (38,000 km^{2})

Power Station
- Hydraulic head: 300 ft (91 m)
- Turbines: 2 x 33.4 MW Francis-type at Fremont Canyon Powerplant
- Installed capacity: 66.8 MW
- Annual generation: 172,606,300 KWh (2007)
- Pathfinder Dam
- U.S. National Register of Historic Places
- NRHP reference No.: 71000888
- Added to NRHP: August 12, 1971

Pathfinder Dam is a masonry dam, located on the North Platte River, approximately 47 miles (76 km) southwest of Casper, Wyoming. It was constructed from 1905 to 1909 as part of the North Platte Project and has been modified several times since then. It is included on the National Register of Historic Places. Construction of the dam created Pathfinder Reservoir which provides water storage for 226,000 acres (910 km^{2}) of irrigation in Wyoming and Nebraska. The dam is named for General John Charles Fremont, who had explored the area in 1842 and was nicknamed the "Pathfinder of the West."

== Description ==
Pathfinder Dam is composed of granite blocks, quarried from the same stone that forms the river's canyon. With Buffalo Bill Dam, its contemporary, Pathfinder Dam was intended to irrigate semi-arid lands in Wyoming. Buffalo Bill Dam is of concrete construction, owing to its location within 7 miles (11 km) from the railroad, while Pathfinder Dam is about 45 miles (72 km) from the nearest railroad. Freight took at least three days to cover the distance, and once took 76 days. Transportation of cement in barrels was not feasible by horse-drawn wagon, so the dam was built of quarried stone. The dam was faced with stones between 24 inches (61 cm) and 36 inches (91 cm) thick, laid in a 2-inch (5.1 cm) thick mortar bed. Between these facings was a core of irregularly-shaped granite blocks of up to ten tons in weight, bedded in mortar and quarry tailings. The diversion tunnel was adapted to become the dam's outlet works. Construction costs were $2.5 million in 1909. An auxiliary dike, 38 feet (12 m) high, extends to the south of the dam. It is an earthfill structure with a concrete corewall. A natural channel was enlarged and straightened to form an uncontrolled spillway on the north side of the dam.

The original diversion tunnel became the north outlet works, abandoned and sealed in 1958 with bulkheads. From 1958 the tunnel was modified to feed the power outlet works, an 18 feet (5.5 m) tunnel extending 3 miles (4.8 km) to the Fremont Canyon Powerplant at the upper end of Alcova Reservoir. The Fremont Canyon Powerplant has a capacity of 66.8 MW with two turbines, upgraded from 48 MW between 1986 and 1990. A low-flow outlet was completed at the dam in 1997 to allow water flow in the four river miles between the dam and the powerplant.

== History ==
Pathfinder Dam overflowing

In 1902 plans were advanced to dam the Sweetwater River at a narrow point known as Devil's Gate. A more ambitious plan was proposed in 1903 by the newly established Bureau of Reclamation to dam a site below the confluence of the Sweetwater and the North Platte. The dam's design was carried out by George Y. Wisner of the Reclamation Service, with consulting engineer Edgar T. Wheeler. Exploratory drilling began in 1903, and a contract for a 480-foot (150 m) long diversion tunnel was let in 1905. Bidding for the dam construction contract was plagued with delays. The initial contractor withdrew, citing bidding errors. Eventually, the construction contract was awarded to the Geddis and Seerie Stone Company of Denver, for an initial sum of $482,000, later rising to $626,523.52. Difficulties with the construction of an upstream cofferdam, created by the contractor's improper blasting of loose rock from the canyon walls, led to the first delays. Foundation work on the dam started in January 1906, with the foundation set only 10 feet (3.0 m) deep.

After delays caused by flood waters, the dam was completed on June 14, 1909. Unusual summer rains filled the reservoir, overtaxed the spillways and threatened to overtop the unfinished auxiliary dike south of the dam, possibly allowing the river to cut a new, lower channel and potentially leaving the damsite dry. Explosive charges were placed in the crest of the main dam to be used if the overflow occurred, thus keeping the lowest point at the dam. The dike held and the charges were not needed, but did have to be removed by explosives experts in 1949. An auxiliary dike was built at the location in 1910 to develop the reservoir's full capacity. The potential overtopping gave rise to sensational stories in Denver newspapers and caused annual nervousness in Casper downstream for a number of years thereafter. The Fremont Canyon Powerplant was built between 1958 and 1961, part of the Glendo Unit of the Pick–Sloan Missouri Basin Project.

The reservoir has suffered from sedimentation, as all dams do, which leads to reduced capacity and leading to a 1995 proposal to add between 2 feet (61 cm) and 2.5 feet (76 cm) to the top of the dam to add storage capacity.

The Pathfinder Interpretive Center is a small museum located in the former damkeeper's residence near the dam. Pathfinder National Wildlife Refuge encompasses portions of the reservoir. There are five campgrounds and a marina on the reservoir. A suspension footbridge crosses the river below the dam. Pathfinder Dam was placed on the National Register of Historic Places on August 12, 1971. In 2015, the dam was included in a historic district encompassing the dam itself, its operating facilities, and the archaeological remains of its construction camp.

The reservoir has overflowed in 1984, 2010 and 2011, and 2016 with overflow water forcing a channel to the immediate north of the dam.

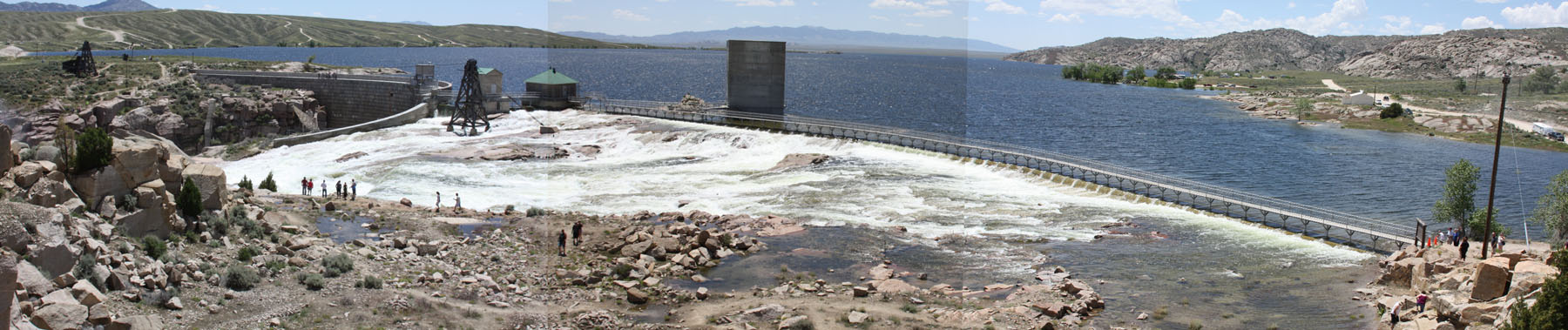
Pathfinder Dam spillway in June 2010

== See also ==
- Theodore Roosevelt Dam, a similar cyclopean masonry dam on Arizona's Salt River Project
