= Northgate Canyon =

Canyon in Colorado and Wyoming, United States

Coordinates: 40°59′59″N 106°20′46″W

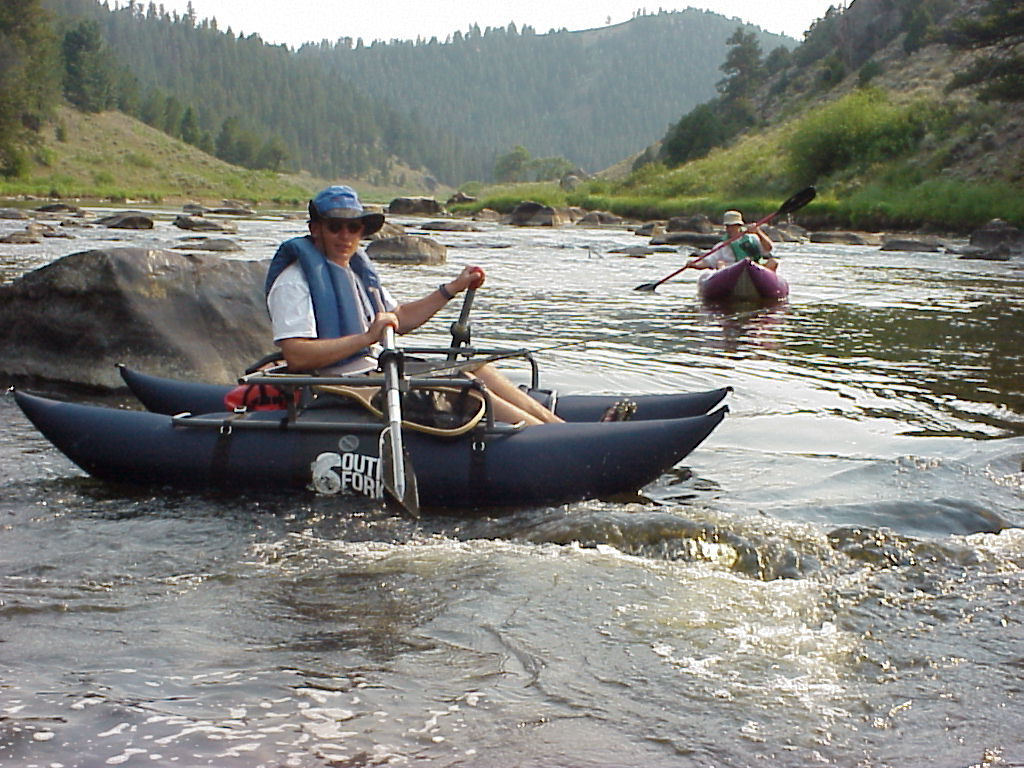
Calm section of Northgate Canyon in low-water conditions

Northgate Canyon is the 9.8-mile (15.8 km) long stretch of the North Platte River between Routt Access (Colorado) and Six-Mile Gap (Wyoming).

== Description ==
Beginning not far from the source of the North Platte River, Northgate Canyon is the river's gateway north. The water follows the western flank of the Park Range in Colorado as it plunges at approximately 20 ft/mile through the canyon. The high gradient produces some of Colorado's and Wyoming's best Class III+ rapids, including Windy Hole, Cowpie, Narrow Falls (The Gate), Tootsie Roll, and Stovepipe.

In addition to the whitewater, the scenery is beautiful. However, the recent migration of pine bark beetles has caused massive damages to the pine forests. It is not uncommon to see deer, elk, moose, or bear near the river. Once the flows begin to recede and the water clarity to increase, the stream is a fun, albeit often difficult, trout fishery.

Most of the riverbank is public (National Forest) land. It should be kept in mind however, that a small section, (visibly marked with several cabins) Gingerquill Ranch is private. Non-emergency landings at the ranch are a violation of Colorado state law and should be avoided.

== Rapid Descriptions ==
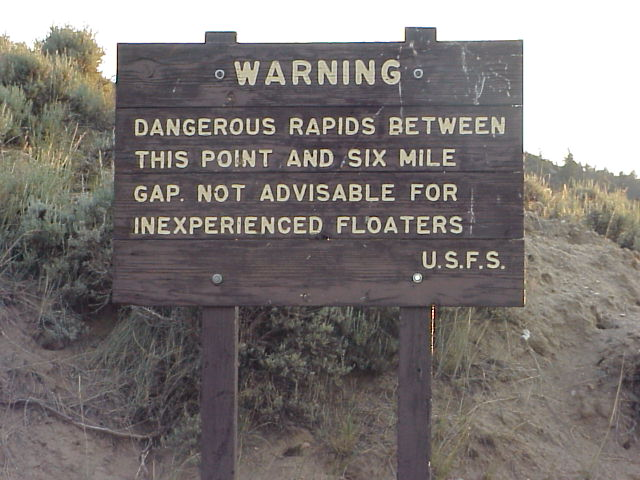
Warning sign at the river bank

Windy Hole - Beginning about one-half mile below the put-in at Routt Access, Windy Hole is the first rapid in Northgate Canyon. The river takes a sharp turn to the left as the flow cuts through solid rock. The entry is usually just left of center. Windy Hole (the hole itself, not the rapid) is about 2/3 through the rapid, and is barely right of center. Only experienced experts in large craft should attempt to take the hole head-on, and then only in lower water conditions. As the flow increases Windy Hole becomes more difficult.

Cowpie (also known as Houserock)- This long rapid begins some time after crossing into Wyoming. The rapid begins after a leisurely right turn in the river and the gradient noticeably increases. Also, a large outcrop of granite on river-left that resembles a cowpie marks the entrance. At the first corner (a left turn) a particular maneuver is required to pass an obstacle known as Split Rock (also known as Cowpie Rock). This is generally navigated on river right with a hard pull back to the left. Proper navigation of Split Rock allows for the ideal set up for the remainder of the rapid. The flow is obstructed by several large boulders and the current weaves from bank to bank. Once the river narrows into a sheer-walled canyon, Cowpie is over and Narrow Falls has arrived. There is no gap between Cowpie and Narrow Falls. The two rapids flow seamlessly into one another. A mistake in Cowpie could prove disastrous in the Falls.

Narrow Falls (also known as The Gate)- Immediately after Cowpie, the river makes a right turn and has a very distinct horizon line. Towering cliffs mark both sides of the rapid. At water levels at or below 2,100 cu ft/s (59 m^{3}/s) a large rock is visible on river right. At higher flows the rock becomes a massive pour-over/hole that should be avoided at all costs. The run is center, just next to the large rock on the right. A chute exists that cannot be scouted for (Narrow Falls is extremely difficult to scout except from a kayak). One left-hand stroke can slide the boat into the chute. Be aware, between 2,100 cu ft/s (59 m^{3}/s) and 1,600 cu ft/s (45 m^{3}/s) a current pushes strongly toward the wall on the left. Above that level, a breaker wave appears and provides a cushion on the wall. The remaining rocks in the center and left of center can be avoided (by going right) or fairly easily navigated by an experienced boatman. At moderate to low flows an eddy forms on river right below the falls allowing boats entering the falls first a place to provide safety for later boats.

Tootsie Roll- About a mile downstream from the conclusion of The Gate (Narrow Falls), Tootsie Roll appears. The rapid is mostly straightforward. Be aware of Cookie Monster at the end however. The two large, often submerged boulders here create two extremely powerful ledge holes. The holes may sneak up on boatmen that are not paying attention. There is a commonly used sneak run to river right. The alternative is to run the holes, which can be avoided at certain, specific levels by delicate maneuvering. This judgment call should be made by the boatman.

Stovepipe- The last rapid in Northgate Canyon is Stovepipe. The sheer walls and slight right turn make the entrance to this rapid identifiable. The take-out for day trips is immediately below the rapid just past the free standing rock pillar and boatmen should stay left to make sure they do not miss it. The rapid itself is a large, but clean wave-train. Caution should be taken to avoid getting too far right, which could result in getting slammed into the wall there.
