= North Platte Project =

Irrigation project

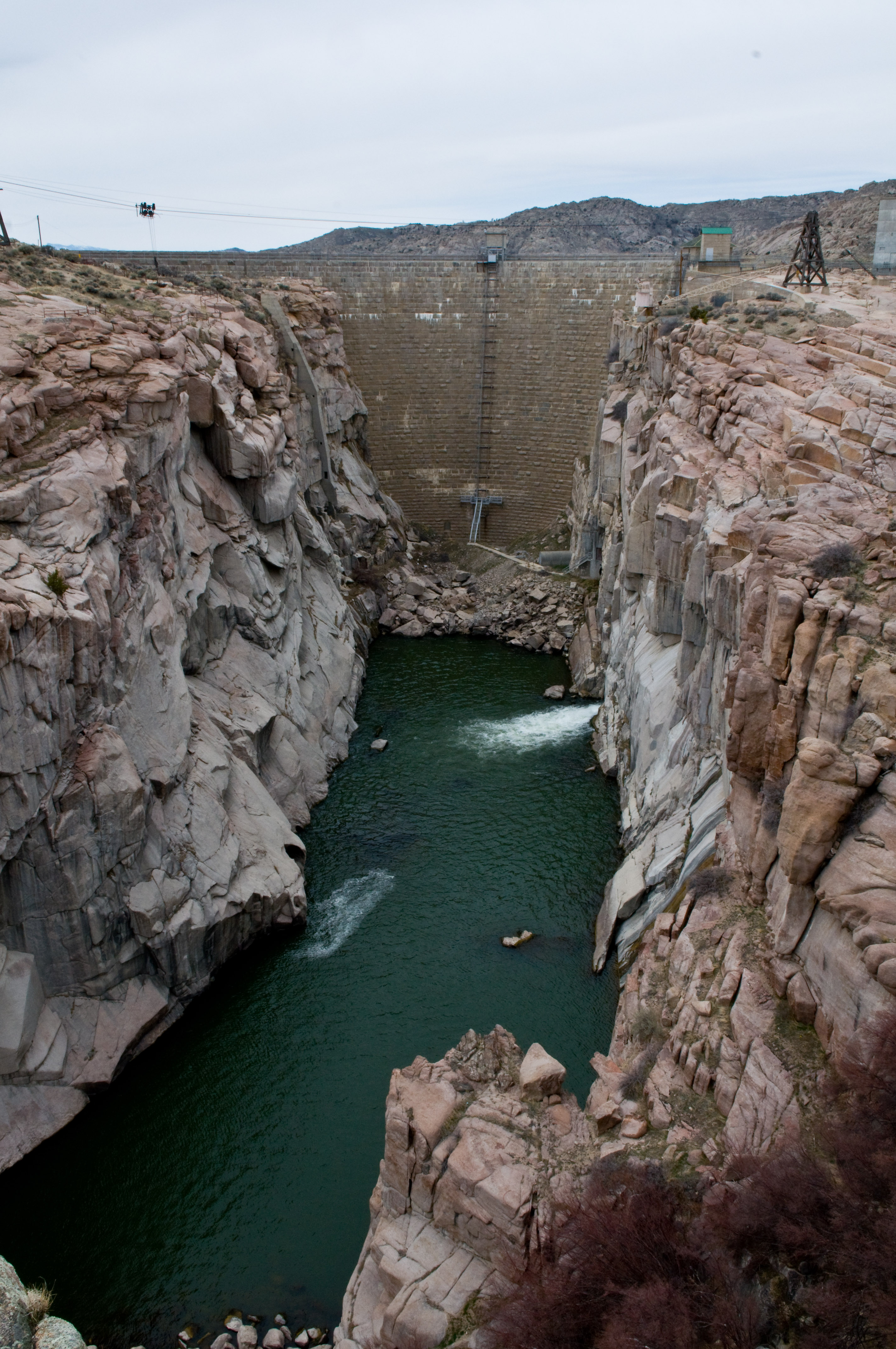
Pathfinder Dam

The North Platte Project (originally the Sweetwater Project) is an irrigation project in the U.S. states of Wyoming and Nebraska. The project provides irrigation service to about 335,000 acres (1,360 km^{2}). The primary water storage for the project is in Pathfinder Reservoir in Wyoming. Downstream, Guernsey Dam manages river flow and provides secondary storage for water released from Pathfinder. Near Fort Laramie the Whalen Diversion Dam diverts water into Fort Laramie Canal and Interstate Canal which distribute water to farms in Wyoming and Nebraska.

== History ==
Surveys for the project began shortly after the Reclamation Act was enacted in 1902. The project was approved by the Department of the Interior in 1903, and work began on Pathfinder Dam and Interstate Canal in 1905. Guernsey Dam was completed in 1927.

In July 2019 a tunnel along the Fort Laramie Canal collapsed, causing Nebraska and Wyoming to declare states of emergency due to lost water.

== Facilities ==
- Pathfinder Dam
- Guernsey Dam and Guernsey Powerplant
- Whalen Diversion Dam
- Pathfinder (formerly Interstate) Canal
- Fort Laramie Canal
