= TS Playfair =

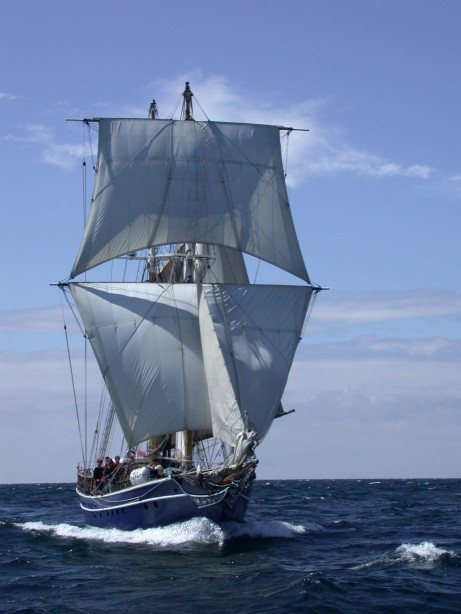
- TS Playfair

History
- Builder: Canada Dredge and Dock Co.
- Laid down: 1972
- Launched: 1973

General characteristics
- Tonnage: 32.98 GRT
- Displacement: 50 tons
- Length: 22 m (72 ft) LOA; 20 m (66 ft) (deck); 14 m (46 ft) LWL
- Beam: 4.5 m (15 ft)
- Draft: 2.5 m (8 ft 2 in)
- Installed power: Volvo Penta D5A TA
- Speed: 8.2 knots (15.2 km/h; 9.4 mph)
- Complement: 28

TS Playfair is a traditionally-rigged brigantine training ship operated by Brigs Youth Sail Training formerly Toronto Brigantine Inc., a sail-training Canadian registered charity based in Hamilton, ON, Canada as of 2021 and formerly in Toronto, ON since 1962. Playfair is used for a youth sail training program on the Great Lakes during the summer months. This program is one of the very few sail training programs where all of the crew except for the captain are in high school (13–18 years old). The summer training is followed by a winter program where youth work through higher levels of training syllabus to become accredited members of the crew the following year.

== History ==
Playfair was constructed for Toronto Brigantine Inc. in 1973 as an addition to an already established sail training organization which began operation with the STV Pathfinder in 1962.

During the Royal Visit to Canada in 1973, Queen Elizabeth II christened Playfair at her launching in Kingston on Wednesday, June 27 with Pathfinder docked just astern; Prince Philip was in attendance.

She was commissioned by Her Majesty Queen Elizabeth II in 1974, and remains the only Canadian ship to be commissioned by a reigning monarch. Although very similar to sister ships Pathfinder and St. Lawrence II, there are several minor structural differences such as a wider transom and a slightly larger freeboard. Since 1974 Playfair has conducted sail training on the Great Lakes with occasional summer voyages down the St. Lawrence River to the Atlantic, most recently in 2007 for Tall Ships Halifax.

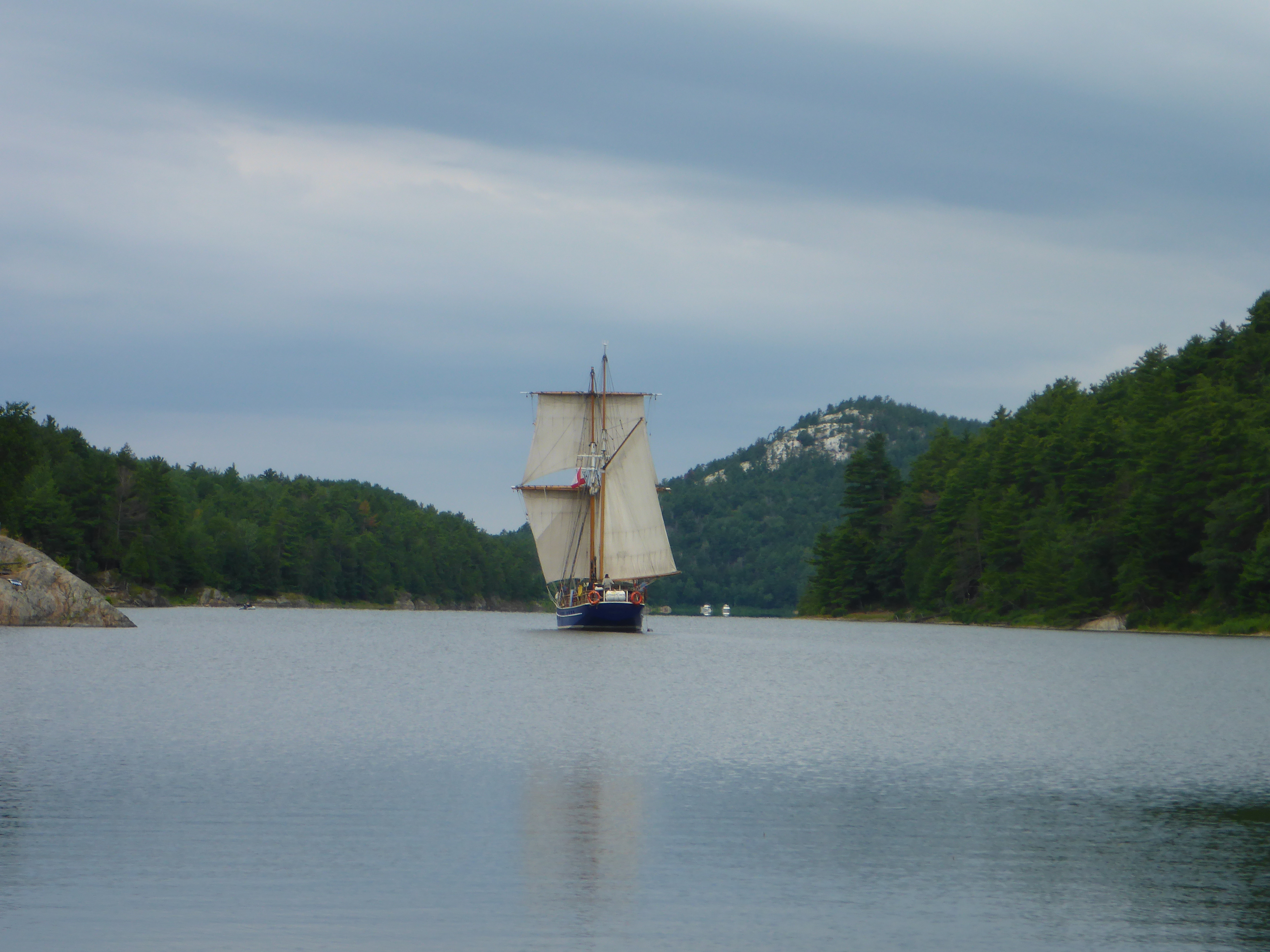
Playfair sailing in to Baie Fine in 2013

== Interior layout ==
Playfair is divided into six watertight compartments from fore to aft the: Forepeak (general bosun stores, anchor chain bins); Petty Officer's Mess (sleeping space for 4 petty officers); Seamen's Mess (sleeping and living space for up to 18 trainees, also includes the galley and a head); Engine Room (area for engine, generator and batteries); Wardroom (sleeping and living space for 6 wardroom officers, a separate head for wardroom, and the captain's cabin, a separate but not watertight compartment) and the Afterpeak (mooring line and fender storage and steering gear).
