= North Platte River =

River in the Western United States

North Platte
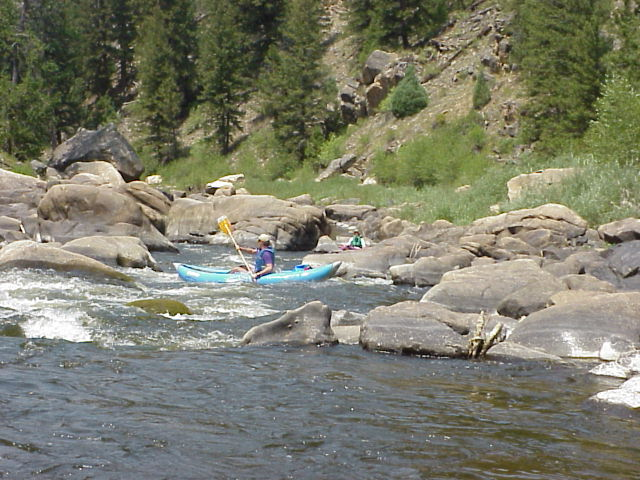
- Kayakers on the North Platte River near the Colorado - Wyoming border in Northgate Canyon

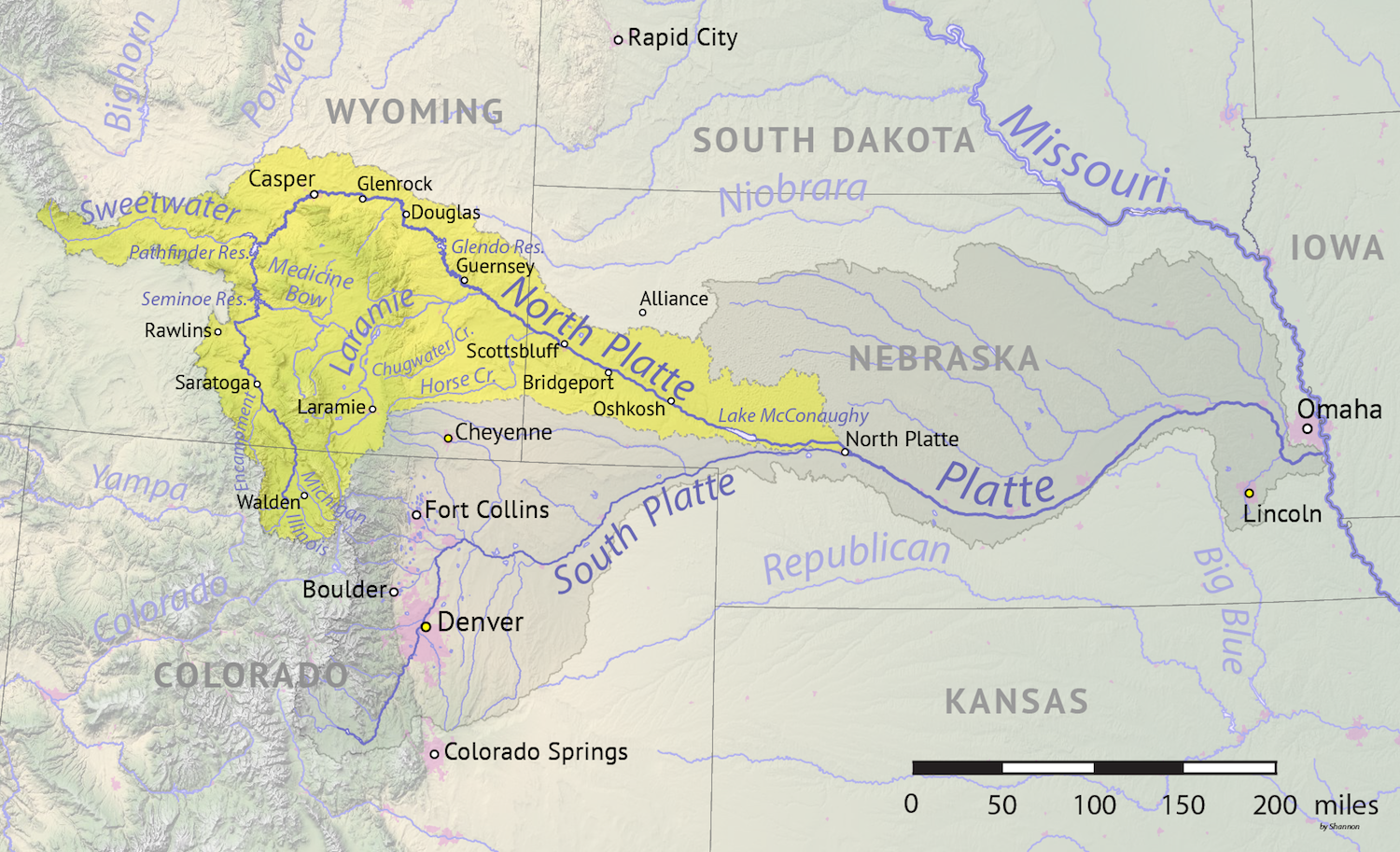
- North Platte River watershed and course

Location
- Country: United States
- State: Colorado, Wyoming, Nebraska
- Cities: Walden, CO, Casper, WY, Scottsbluff, NE, Oshkosh, NE, North Platte, NE

Physical characteristics
- Source: Confluence of Grizzly and Little Grizzly Creeks in Colorado
  - location: Jackson County, Colorado
  - coordinates: 40.550331°N 106.392975°W
  - elevation: 8,060 ft (2,460 m)
- Mouth: Platte River
  - location: Lincoln County, Nebraska
  - coordinates: 41.115573°N 100.687637°W
  - elevation: 2,762 ft (842 m)
- Length: 716 mi (1,152 km)
- Basin size: 30,900 sq mi (80,000 km^{2})
- Discharge
  - location: Lisco, NE
  - average: 1,355 cu ft/s (38.4 m^{3}/s)
  - minimum: 63.1 cu ft/s (1.79 m^{3}/s)
  - maximum: 20,100 cu ft/s (570 m^{3}/s)

Basin features
- Tributaries
  - left: Sweetwater River
  - right: Medicine Bow River, Laramie River

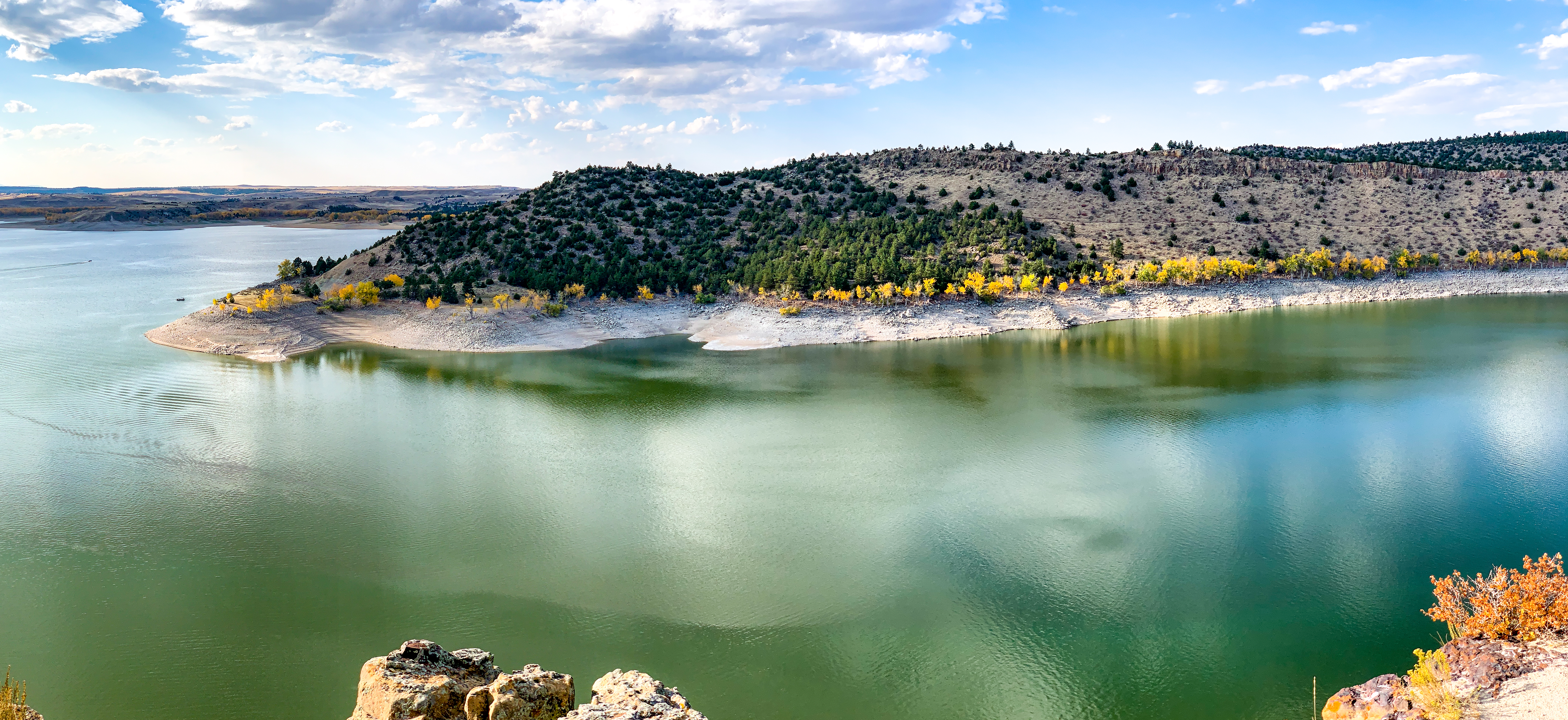

The North Platte River is a major tributary of the Platte River and is approximately 716 miles (1,152 km) long, counting its many curves. In a straight line, it travels about 550 miles (890 km), along its course through the U.S. states of Colorado, Wyoming, and Nebraska.

The head of the river is essentially all of Jackson County, Colorado, whose boundaries are the continental divide on the west and south and the mountain drainage peaks on the east—the north boundary is the state of Wyoming border. The rugged Rocky Mountains surrounding Jackson County have at least twelve peaks over 11,000 feet (3,400 m) in height. From Jackson County, the river flows north about 200 miles (320 km) out of the Routt National Forest and North Park (Colorado basin) near what is now Walden, Colorado, to Casper, Wyoming. Shortly after passing Casper, the river turns to the east-southeast and flows about 350 miles (560 km) to the city of North Platte, Nebraska.

The North Platte and South Platte River join to form the Platte River in western Nebraska near the city of North Platte, Nebraska. The Platte River flows to the Missouri River, which joins the Mississippi River to flow to the Gulf of Mexico. The river provides the major avenue of drainage for northern Colorado, eastern Wyoming, and western Nebraska. It is only navigable over most of its length at high water by canoes, kayaks, and rubber rafts.

== History as a trail west ==
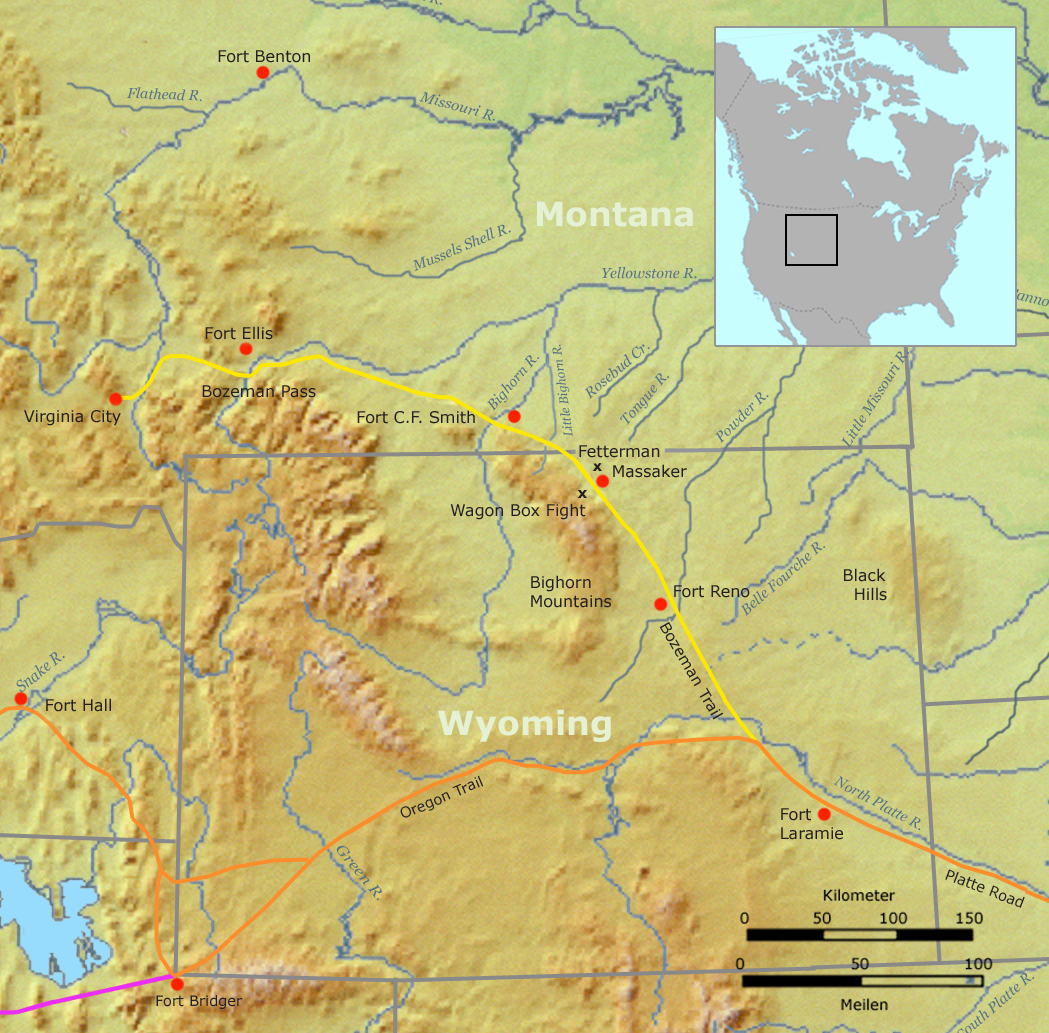
California, Mormon, Oregon and Bozeman Trails along North Platte River

External images
- National Trail Map
- National Parks Oregon Trail Map
- National Parks California Trail Map
- Proposed Oregon, California, Mormon, Pony Express Trail Map

The North Platte River drainage has been an important westward route in the westward expansion of the United States. To get the two essentials, water and grass, for the traveler's animals, the emigration trails nearly always followed river valleys across the North American continent. These trails extended from the Missouri River, Platte River, and the North Platte River across Nebraska and parts of Wyoming and on to its confluence with the Sweetwater River. About 50 miles (80 km) beyond what is now Casper, Wyoming the main emigration trails left the North Platte valley and followed the Sweetwater River valley and other river valleys going further west.

The trail route along the North Platte River was first written about by Wilson Price Hunt of the Astor Expedition, who was traveling back to the Missouri River from the newly established Fort Astoria on the Columbia River in 1811. The lack of American trappers and settlers in the contested Oregon Territory resulted in this early discovery being unused and nearly forgotten. Jedediah Smith and several trappers in 1823 rediscovered the route, and the trail along the Platte, North Platte, and Sweetwater Rivers became a major trail to the fur trader’s summer time Rocky Mountain Rendezvous. Mule trains carrying trading supplies for the mountain men and fur trappers were some of the first to use the trail in 1824. The fur traders on their return trip carried the traded furs back east at the end of the summer trading season. This fur trade route continued to be used until about 1840. By about 1832, the trail along the Platte, North Platte, and Sweetwater Rivers had been improved by the fur traders to a rough wagon trail from the Missouri River to the Green River in Wyoming, where most of the Rocky Mountain Rendezvous occurred. Following the fur traders, the major emigration trails established along the north and south banks of the North Platte River were the Oregon (1843–1869), California (1843–1869), Mormon (1847–1869) and the Bozeman (1863–68) Trails. The trails north of the North Platte River originally crossed the North Platte near Fort Laramie to join the original Oregon and California Trail Route on the south side. In 1850, Child's Route (Child's Cutoff) extended the north side trail to what is now Casper, Wyoming. The rugged landscape from Fort Laramie, Wyoming to Casper meant that the trails often deviated from the river to find an easier path and relied on streams draining into the North Platte for water.

== River description ==
Up in central north Colorado rests North Park (Colorado basin), a valley ringed by 12,000 feet (3,700 m) mountains. The headwaters of the river are essentially all of Jackson County, Colorado, whose boundaries are the continental divide on the west and south and the mountain drainage peaks on the east—the north boundary is the state of Wyoming boundary. The rugged Rocky Mountains Continental Divide surrounding Jackson County has at least twelve peaks over 11,000 feet (3,400 m) in height. These peaks include on the west: Mount Zirkel 12,180 feet (3,710 m), Lost ranger Peak 11,932 feet (3,637 m) and Mount Ethel 11,924 feet (3,634 m); on the south: Sheep Mountain 11,819 feet (3,602 m) and Parkview Mountain 12,296 feet (3,748 m)—whose waters on the south or east side drain into the North Platte River drainage. On the east are: Mount Nimbus 12,706 feet (3,873 m), Mount Cumulus 12,725 feet (3,879 m), Howard Mountain 12,810 feet (3,900 m), Mount Cirrus 12,797 feet (3,901 m), Mount Richthofen 12,940 feet (3,940 m), Lead Mountain 12,537 feet (3,821 m), North Diamond Peak 11,852 feet (3,612 m) and Clark Peak 12,951 feet (3,947 m) whose eastern slope waters drain into the North Platte River.

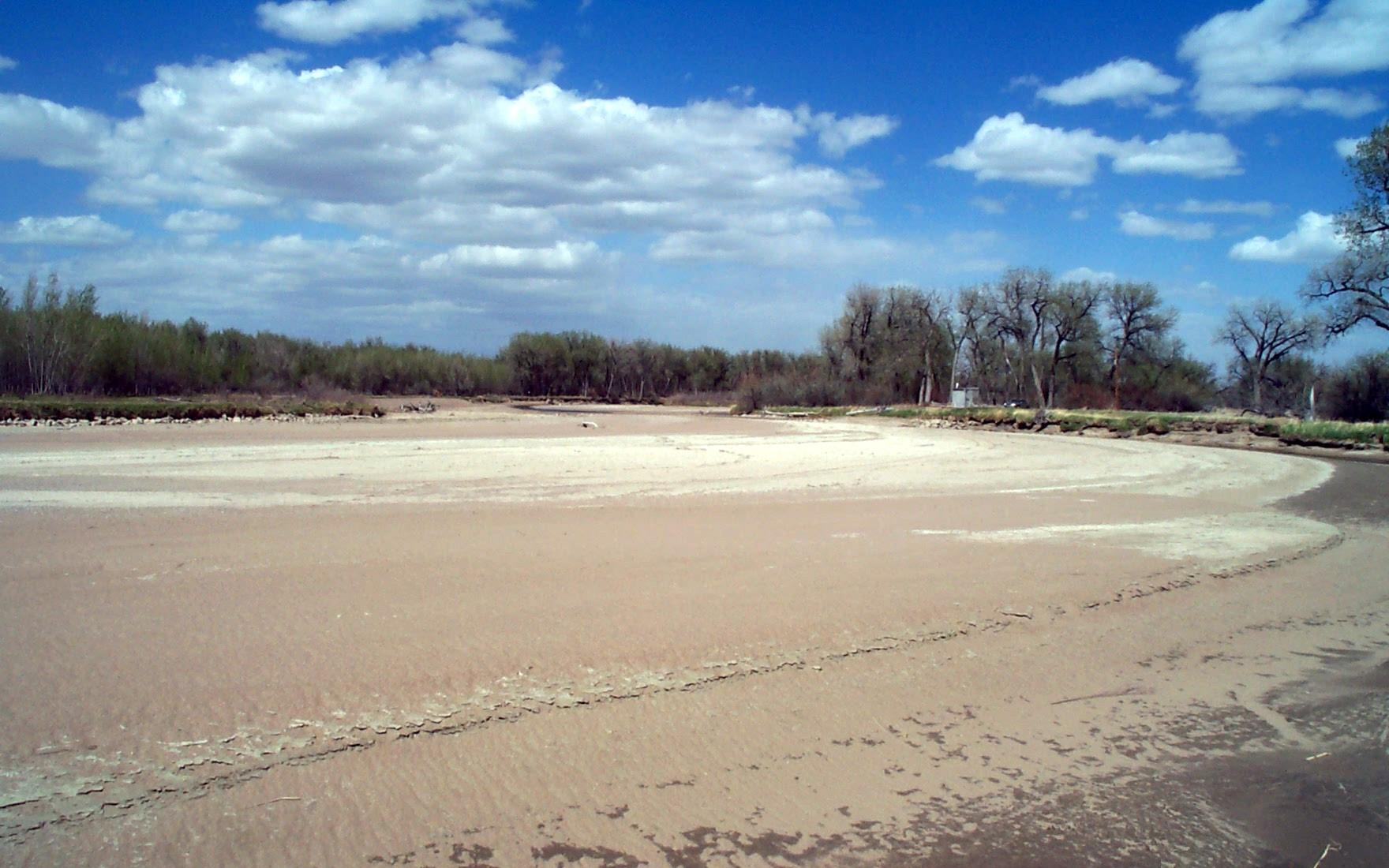
Dry stream channel on the North Platte River in Goshen County, Wyoming during May 2002 drought conditions

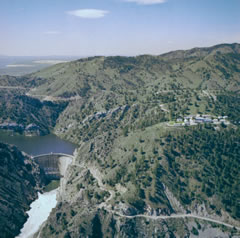
Seminoe Dam and reservoir from the air

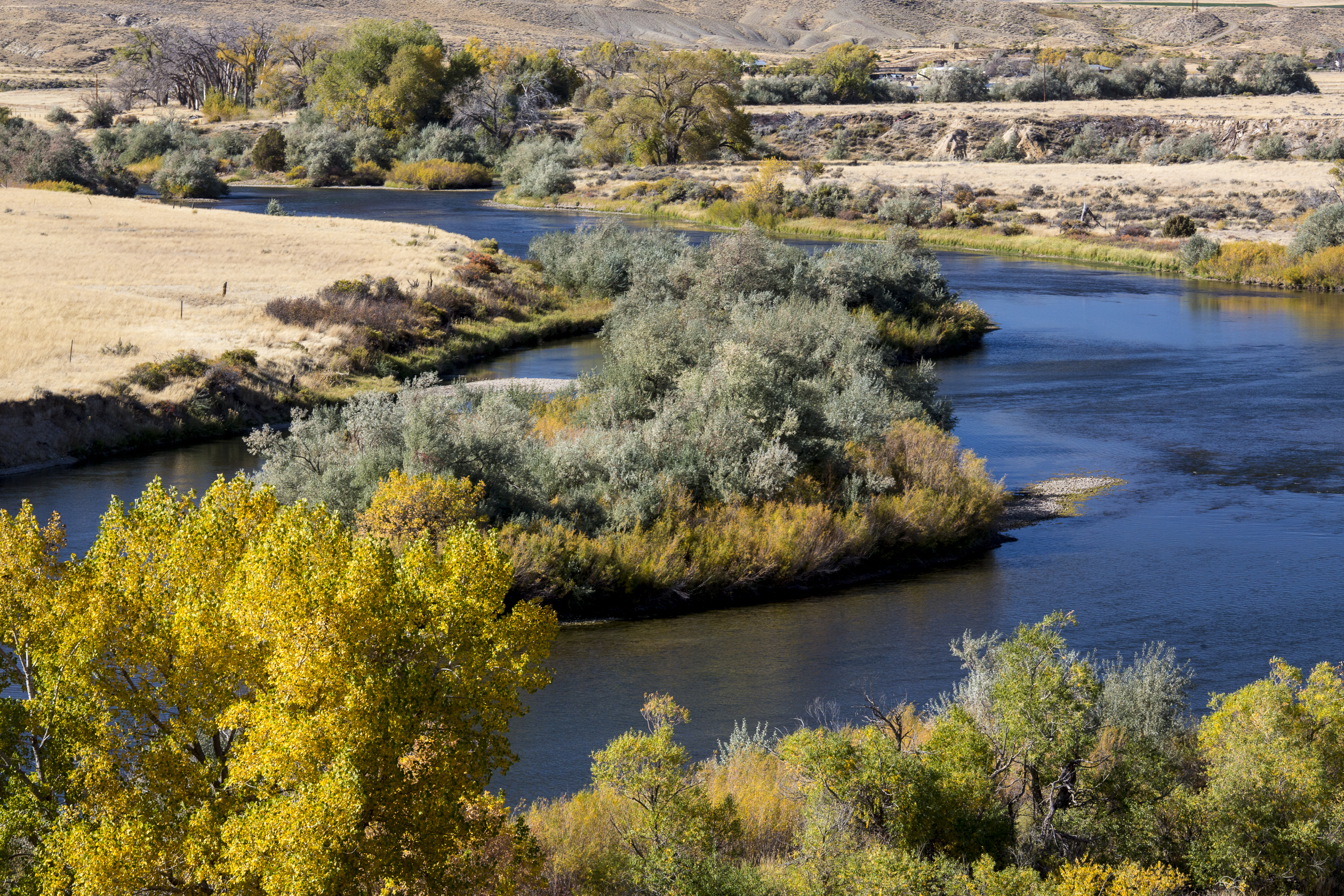
The Trappers Route Special Recreation Management Area is located north of Casper, Wyoming along the North Platte River.

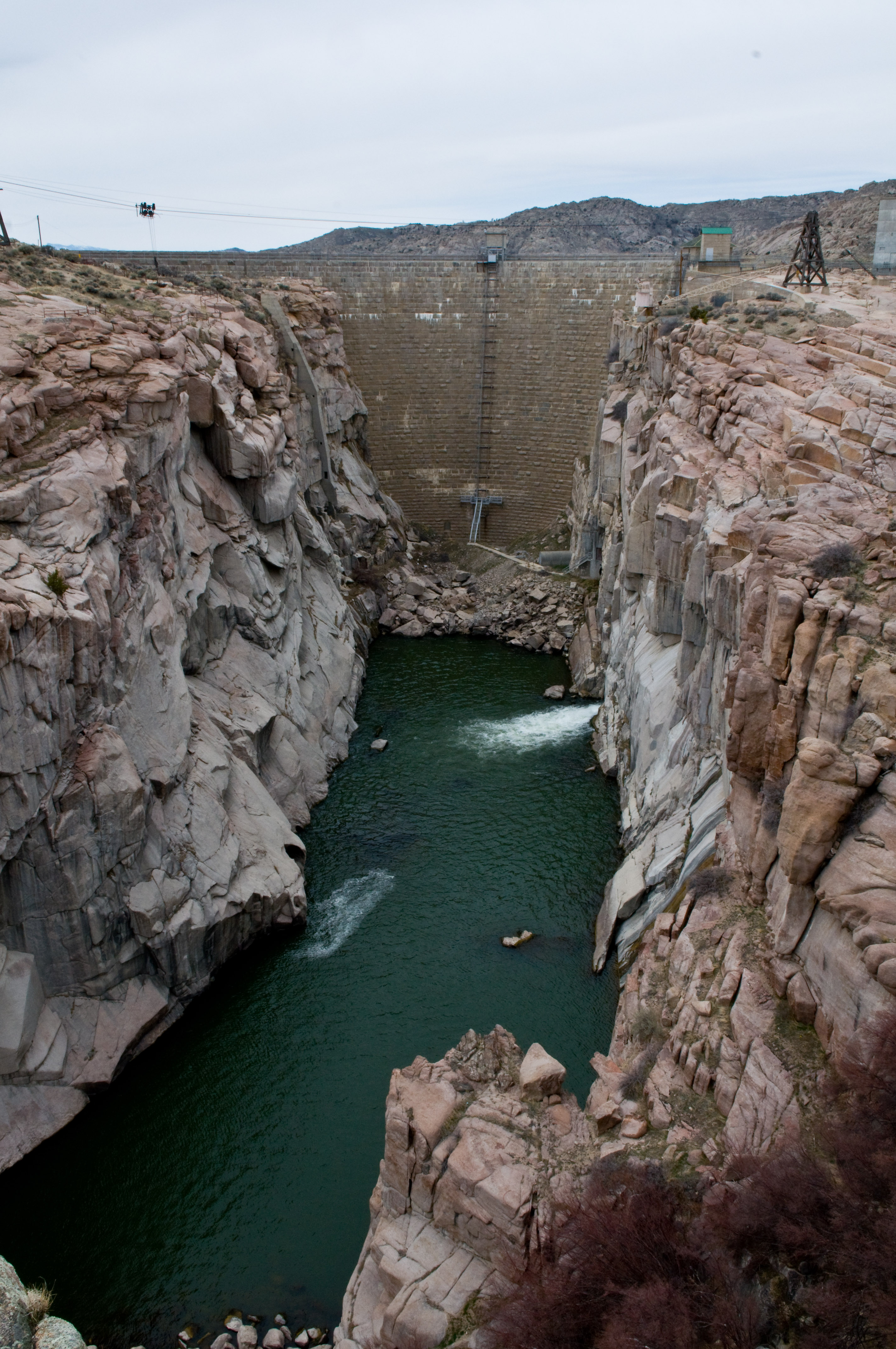
Pathfinder Dam on the North Platte River

In Jackson County, the North Platte is joined by several other small streams draining the mountains around the county. Some of these creeks are: Arapaho Creek, Colorado Creek, East Branch Illinois River, Jack Creek, Jewell Lake Trib., Grizzly Creek, Little Grizzly Creek, Norris Creek, North Fork of North Platte River, Rock Creek (Little Willow Ck), South Fork Canadian River, South Fork Michigan River, Willow Creek and in Wyoming the Encampment River. All these streams are draining the snow melt from the mountains surrounding Jackson County. The North Platte River flows northward from Colorado into Wyoming through the popular rafting site – Northgate Canyon which is along the western side of the Medicine Bow Mountains.

In Colorado and Wyoming, the river is narrower and much swifter flowing than it is in Nebraska, where it becomes a slow-flowing, shallow braided stream. The upper reaches of the river in the Rockies in Colorado and Wyoming are popular for recreation, rafting, and fly fishing on the river and its many tributaries for rainbow trout and other sport fish. In western Nebraska, the banks and riverbed of the North Platte provide a green oasis amid an otherwise semi-arid region of North America.

The river has been dammed several times to form several reservoirs along its course. On the north end of the Park range, it is joined by the Medicine Bow River in the Seminoe Reservoir formed by Seminoe Dam, further downstream is the Kortes Reservoir. Still further downstream about 50 miles (80 km) above Casper the North Platte is joined by the Sweetwater River to form the Pathfinder Reservoir. Northeast of the Pathfinder Reservoir it passes through the Alcova and Gray Reef reservoirs before it hits Casper. Casper was established in 1888 east of the former site of Fort Caspar, which was built about 1859 during the mass migration along the Oregon, California, Mormon and Bozeman trails. Near what is now Casper was the location of several ferries that offered passage across the North Platte River during the summer "Trail season" starting about 1847. In 1847, during the first Mormon emigration, Brigham Young, leading the Mormon settlers to Salt Lake City, Utah, established a ferry near present-day Casper known as the Mormon Ferry. The next year, the ferry was moved a few miles downriver. Soon, competing ferries were built. In 1859, Louis Guinard built a toll bridge across the North Platte and a trading post near the original ferry's location. Before reaching Casper, the river turns and flows northeast between the Granite Mountains to the west and the Laramie Mountains to the east.

The North Platte emerges from the mountains near Casper, where it turns and flows east-southeast, along the northern edge of the Laramie Mountains onto the Great Plains. The North Platte flows east-southeast across the plains of eastern Wyoming, past the town of Douglas, Wyoming and through Glendo and Guernsey Reservoirs. It then flows past the Fort Laramie National Historic Site (the former site of Fort Laramie), where it is joined by the Laramie River. The North Platte is joined by Horse Creek, flowing in from Wyoming near the Wyoming-Nebraska border as its last significant addition. It crosses into western Nebraska, flowing east-southeast between the cities of Scottsbluff, Nebraska and Gering, Nebraska. In Keith County, Nebraska, the Kingsley Dam forms Lake C.W. McConaughy, the largest reservoir in Nebraska and a significant irrigation and recreation facility for the region. Kingsley Dam, constructed from 1935 to 1941, is located on the east side of Lake McConaughy in central Keith County, Nebraska, and is the second-largest hydraulic fill dam in the world. East of the Kingsley dam, the North Platte River flows nearly parallel to the South Platte River. In many places, they are separated by only about 5 mi (8 km) for a stretch of about 50 mi (80 km) before they join to form the Platte River just east of the city of North Platte, Nebraska.

The wagon trails following the south side of the Platte/North Platte River ferried or waded in low water years across the South Platte River in several places to stay on the south side of the North Platte River where the trails were located. Those who later went on to Denver, Colorado followed the South Platte River trail into Colorado. Historically, the North Platte River used to be up to a mile wide (1.6 km) in many places, as evidenced by the old streambed and written records. Today, by the time the North Platte reaches Paxton, Nebraska, it is much smaller due to the extensive water taken from it for irrigation.

== See also ==
- List of longest rivers of the United States (by main stem)
- List of rivers of Colorado
- List of rivers of Wyoming
- List of rivers of Nebraska
- Lisco, Nebraska
