= St. Lawrence II =

- Brigantine St. Lawrence II

History

Canada
- Name: St. Lawrence II
- Builder: Kingston Shipyard, Kingston
- Launched: 1953
- In service: 1954
- Identification: MMSI number: 316006523; Callsign: VA2397
- Status: In service
- Notes: Designed in 1952 by Francis MacLachlan and Mike Eames.

General characteristics
- Class & type: Brigantine
- Length: 72 ft (22 m) (sparred length); 60 ft (18 m) (deck length)
- Beam: 15 ft (4.6 m)
- Draught: 8.5 ft (2.6 m)
- Propulsion: 125 horsepower diesel engine
- Sail plan: 2,500 square feet, 11 sails in a brigantine rig
- Complement: Accommodation for 28 officers and trainees in three cabins.
- Notes: GPS, VHF radio

The STV St. Lawrence II (Sail Training Vessel) is a 72-foot (22 m) brigantine designed for youth sail training and is operated by a crew of 14- to 19-year-olds. It was designed in 1952 by Francis MacLachlan and Mike Eames, designed for the sole purpose of youth sail training. The hull was built in 1953 in the Kingston, Ontario shipyards, with the rest of the ship finished by local craftsmen, Kingston sea cadets and enthusiastic amateurs. When the St. Lawrence II first started out she was affiliated with the Royal Canadian Sea Cadets Corps St. Lawrence, but eventually her program was opened to any participants ages 12–18 for a summer training cruises.

The St. Lawrence II's home port is Kingston, Ontario. The ship sails mostly in the Great Lakes and the St. Lawrence River, but sometimes will venture as far as New York City. The success of the St. Lawrence II was the inspiration for the construction and launch of her Toronto-based sisterships STV Pathfinder (in 1962) and TS Playfair (in 1973), with both training vessels also being designed by Francis A. MacLachlan.

Aboard the ship there are three watches: red, white and blue. Each watch is under the direction of a watch officer; the remainder of the watch consists of a petty officer or chief petty officer and up to 6 trainees. Those who sign on to the St. Lawrence II for a course during the summer become trainees who comprise the basic unit of the ship and who complete most of the tasks, directed by petty officers.

On each watch the watch officer is the senior officer and is usually at the helm or plotting a course so it's up to the petty officers to get the trainees to do their part. Other positions on the ship are the cook, the bosun, the executive officer and the captain.

The captain and the executive officer are usually the only people on the ship who are over 18 years of age, and they are the most qualified. The watch officers, cook, bosun and petty officers are often under 18 but they will have participated in multiple training cruises and completed further training during the winter training program.
