= Pathfinder Reservoir =

- Location within Wyoming Location within the United States
- Location: Carbon / Natrona counties, Wyoming, United States
- Coordinates: 42°28′05″N 106°51′14″W
- Type: reservoir
- Primary inflows: North Platte River
- Primary outflows: North Platte River
- Basin countries: United States
- Max. depth: 192 feet (59 m)
- Water volume: 1,016,000 acre⋅ft (1.253 km^{3})
- Shore length^{1}: 117 mi (188 km)
- Surface elevation: 5,846 ft (1,782 m)
- ^{1} Shore length is not a well-defined measure.

Pathfinder Reservoir is located in the U.S. state of Wyoming on the North Platte River between Casper and Rawlins. It sits 47 miles (76 km) southwest of Casper, in Carbon County and Natrona County. The reservoir was created by Pathfinder Dam and has a storage capacity of 1,016,000 acre-feet (1.253×10^{9} m^{3}). The shoreline consists of 117 miles (188 km). Much of the water used to serve the 335,000 acre (1360 km^{2}) North Platte Project is stored here. Some of the water in the reservoir is released to satisfy other water rights and to operate power plants downstream of the reservoir. Much of the Pathfinder Reservoir is included in the Pathfinder National Wildlife Refuge. Pathfinder Reservoir is the site of the only established population of the Macedonian Ohrid Trout (S. letnica) in the United States.

== History ==
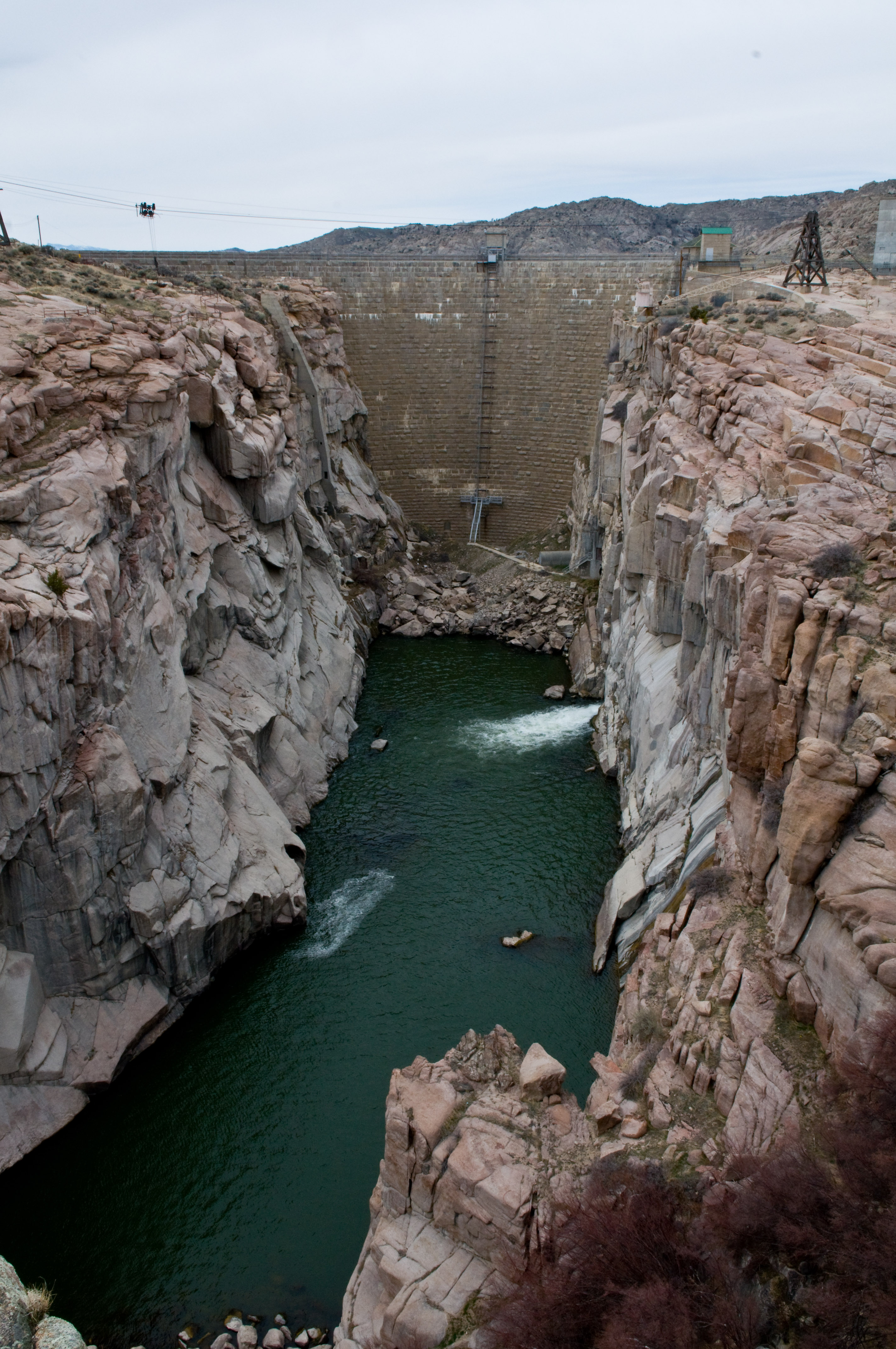
Pathfinder Dam, which created the reservoir

Pathfinder Dam was one of the earliest major projects undertaken by the newly formed U.S. Reclamation Service (now the Bureau of Reclamation) following the Reclamation Act of 1902. Named after the explorer John C. "The Pathfinder" Fremont, the dam was designed to capture the spring runoff of the North Platte and Sweetwater Rivers to irrigate over 200,000 acres of arid land in Wyoming and Nebraska. The site was incredibly remote. Every barrel of cement had to be hauled by horse and wagon from Casper, nearly 50 miles away. The trip took a minimum of three days, and in harsh winters, freight teams often lost animals to the sub-zero temperatures. Engineers George Y. Wisner and Edgar T. Wheeler developed the "Arch and Crown-Cantilever Method" for this project. This was a revolutionary design that distributed the water's weight between the horizontal arch of the dam and its vertical foundation. Just as the dam was nearing completion in June 1909, massive floods threatened to overtop an unfinished earthen dike. Fearing a catastrophic failure, engineers actually placed dynamite charges in the dam’s top tiers, intending to blow a hole in their own work to save the structure from a total breach. Fortunately, the dike held, and the explosives were safely removed in 1949.

== Geology ==
Pathfinder sits at the edge of the Granite Mountains and the Sweetwater Arch, a broad northwest-trending structural uplift. The reservoir occupies a basin formed by the confluence of several rivers, framed by rugged canyons that reach depths of 120 feet. The dam is anchored into Precambrian granite and metamorphic rocks that are approximately 2.7 billion years old. These rocks are exceptionally hard and provided the "cyclopean" masonry blocks used to build the dam. Elements of the Chugwater Formation, Madison Limestone, and Tensleep Sandstone are present in the reservoir, and elements of the Cloverly Formation. The Cloverly Formation is a Cretaceous-age layer containing quartz-pebble conglomerates, marking ancient river and floodplain environments. The area contains "banded iron formations" and has been the subject of magnetic surveys due to isolated, strong anomalies caused by magnetic minerals within the basement complex. The reservoir completely covered the original narrow gorge of the North Platte River. When the reservoir was temporarily drained in 1958 for tunnel maintenance, engineers observed up to 50 years of sediment deposits—reaching depths of nearly 30 feet in some areas—resting directly on the original cobble riverbed.

== Climate ==
According to the Köppen Climate Classification system, Pathfinder Reservoir has a cold semi-arid climate, abbreviated "BSk" on climate maps. The hottest temperature recorded at Pathfinder Reservoir was 100 °F (38 °C) on July 14, 1925, July 12–13, 1954, July 22, 1960, and July 7–9, 1989, while the coldest temperature recorded was −39 °F (−39 °C) on January 17, 1930.

Climate data for Pathfinder Dam, Wyoming, 1991–2020 normals, extremes 1905–present
Month	Jan	Feb	Mar	Apr	May	Jun	Jul	Aug	Sep	Oct	Nov	Dec	Year
Record high °F (°C)	59 (15)	67 (19)	72 (22)	82 (28)	89 (32)	98 (37)	100 (38)	99 (37)	95 (35)	88 (31)	75 (24)	64 (18)	100 (38)
Mean maximum °F (°C)	45.0 (7.2)	48.6 (9.2)	62.1 (16.7)	72.5 (22.5)	80.1 (26.7)	91.1 (32.8)	94.2 (34.6)	92.9 (33.8)	88.9 (31.6)	75.5 (24.2)	62.8 (17.1)	49.7 (9.8)	95.0 (35.0)
Mean daily maximum °F (°C)	33.0 (0.6)	35.6 (2.0)	45.6 (7.6)	53.7 (12.1)	64.2 (17.9)	76.5 (24.7)	85.5 (29.7)	83.0 (28.3)	72.8 (22.7)	58.1 (14.5)	44.8 (7.1)	33.3 (0.7)	57.2 (14.0)
Daily mean °F (°C)	24.6 (−4.1)	26.1 (−3.3)	36.0 (2.2)	42.7 (5.9)	52.4 (11.3)	63.3 (17.4)	71.7 (22.1)	69.9 (21.1)	60.2 (15.7)	47.2 (8.4)	36.0 (2.2)	25.5 (−3.6)	46.3 (7.9)
Mean daily minimum °F (°C)	16.3 (−8.7)	16.6 (−8.6)	26.4 (−3.1)	31.8 (−0.1)	40.5 (4.7)	50.1 (10.1)	57.9 (14.4)	56.8 (13.8)	47.7 (8.7)	36.3 (2.4)	27.2 (−2.7)	17.7 (−7.9)	35.4 (1.9)
Mean minimum °F (°C)	−7.7 (−22.1)	−6.9 (−21.6)	3.9 (−15.6)	16.1 (−8.8)	28.3 (−2.1)	39.7 (4.3)	48.9 (9.4)	45.8 (7.7)	36.5 (2.5)	18.8 (−7.3)	7.6 (−13.6)	−6.0 (−21.1)	−14.3 (−25.7)
Record low °F (°C)	−39 (−39)	−35 (−37)	−33 (−36)	−5 (−21)	15 (−9)	22 (−6)	33 (1)	27 (−3)	13 (−11)	−7 (−22)	−20 (−29)	−34 (−37)	−39 (−39)
Average precipitation inches (mm)	0.58 (15)	0.48 (12)	0.83 (21)	1.24 (31)	1.93 (49)	1.37 (35)	0.74 (19)	1.05 (27)	0.83 (21)	1.13 (29)	0.49 (12)	0.53 (13)	11.20 (284)
Average snowfall inches (cm)	3.2 (8.1)	4.6 (12)	5.8 (15)	4.5 (11)	1.0 (2.5)	0.1 (0.25)	0.0 (0.0)	0.0 (0.0)	0.1 (0.25)	1.7 (4.3)	3.6 (9.1)	4.0 (10)	28.6 (72.5)
Average precipitation days (≥ 0.01 in)	6.9	6.6	7.5	10.2	10.8	7.8	7.2	5.9	6.3	8.2	5.8	7.8	91.0
Average snowy days (≥ 0.1 in)	3.6	4.0	4.1	2.6	0.5	0.0	0.0	0.0	0.1	1.3	2.8	3.6	22.6
Source 1: NOAA
Source 2: National Weather Service (WRCC mean maxima, mean minima, average snowfall, NWS snowy days 1905–present)

== See also ==
- List of largest reservoirs of Wyoming
