= Independence Rock =

Historic landmark in Wyoming, US

- U.S. National Register of Historic Places
- U.S. National Historic Landmark
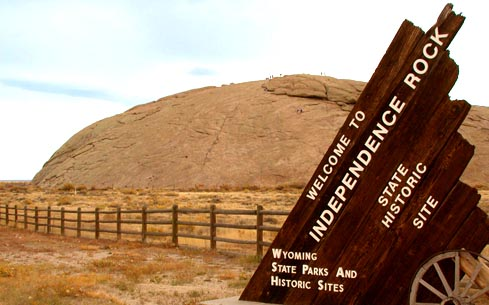

- Location within Wyoming Location within the United States
- Location: 60 mi (97 km) SW of Casper on WYO 220, Natrona County, Wyoming
- Coordinates: 42.494°N 107.133°W
- Area: 170 acres (69 ha)
- NRHP reference No.: 66000757

Significant dates
- Added to NRHP: October 15, 1966
- Designated NHL: January 20, 1961

Independence Rock is a large granite rock, approximately 130 feet (40 m) high, 1,900 feet (580 m) long, and 850 feet (260 m) wide, which is in southwestern Natrona County, Wyoming, United States, along Wyoming Highway 220. During the middle of the 19th century, it formed a prominent and well-known landmark on the Oregon, Mormon, and California emigrant trails. Many of these emigrants carved their names on it, and it was described by early missionary and explorer Father Pierre-Jean De Smet in 1840 as the Register of the Desert. The site was designated a National Historic Landmark on January 20, 1961 and is now part of Independence Rock State Historic Site, owned and operated by the state of Wyoming.

== Description ==
The rock is a large rounded monolith of Archean granite typical of the surrounding region and is an isolated peak at the southeast end of the Granite Mountains. Its appearance is somewhat like the rounded Enchanted Rock of Texas or Uluru in Australia (formerly known as Ayers Rock), although smaller in size. It is located in the high plateau region of central Wyoming, north of the Sentinel Rocks ridge and adjacent to the Sweetwater River. It is accessible from a rest area on Wyoming Highway 220, approximately 20 miles (32 km) northeast of Muddy Gap and 60 miles (97 km) south-west of Casper.

== History ==
The rock derives its name from the fact that it lies directly along the route of the Emigrant Trail. Pioneering wagon parties bound for Oregon or California usually left the Missouri River in the early spring and hoped to reach the rock by July 4 (Independence Day in the United States), in order to reach their destinations before the first mountain snowfalls. It was likely named prior to 1830. John C. Frémont camped a mile below this site on August 1, 1843 and made this entry in the journal of his 1843–1844 expedition:

Everywhere within six or eight feet of the ground, where the surface is sufficiently smooth, and in some places sixty or eighty feet above, the rock is inscribed with the names of travelers. Many a name famous in the history of this country, and some well known to science, are to be found among those of traders and travelers.

Fremont carved a large cross into the rock monolith, which was blasted off the rock on July 4, 1847 by hundreds of California and Oregon emigrants who had gathered on the site. Some Protestants considered the cross to be a symbol of the Pope and Catholicism. John Frémont was actually a member of the United States Episcopal Church.

On July 4, 1862, Independence Rock was the site of Wyoming's first Masonic Lodge meeting.

== Gallery ==
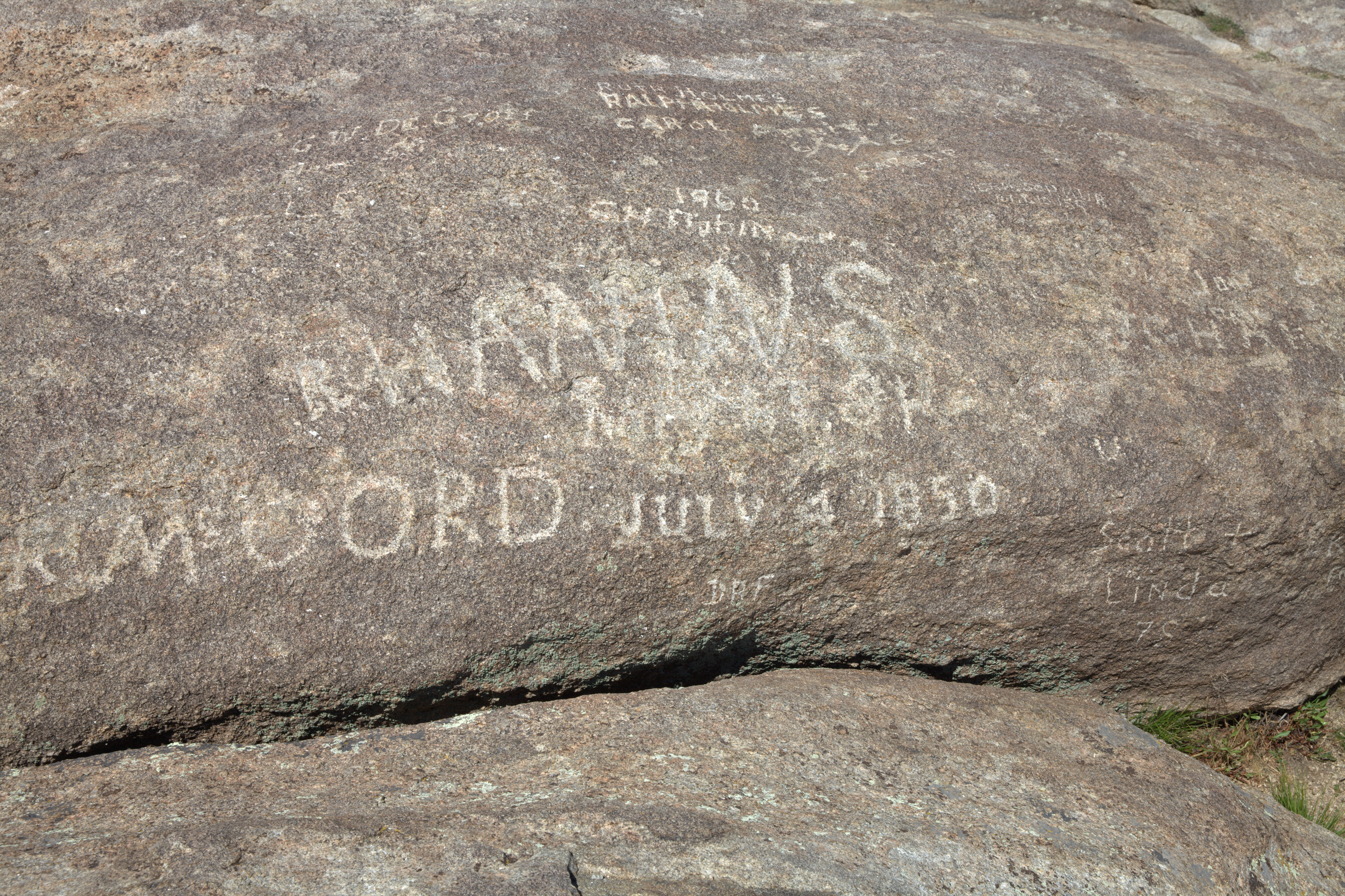
Names right on Independence Rock, particularly of R. McCord in 1850

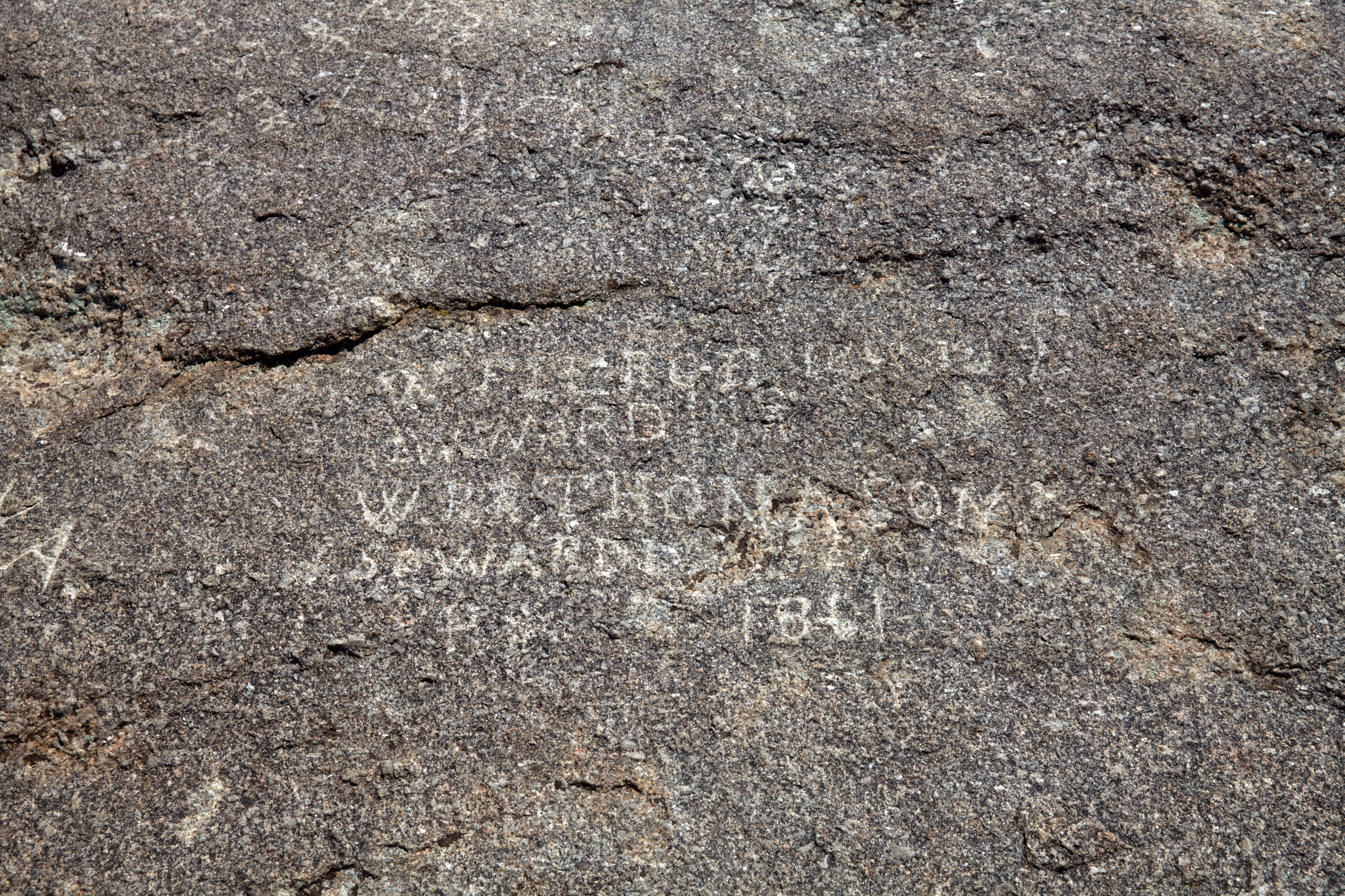
Names carved on Independence Rock, particularly of W.R.R. Thompson, W. Pierce, J. Ware and J.S.O. Ward in 1861

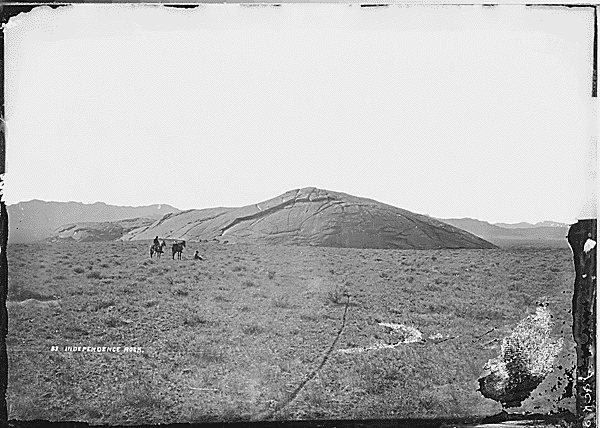
Independence Rock in 1870

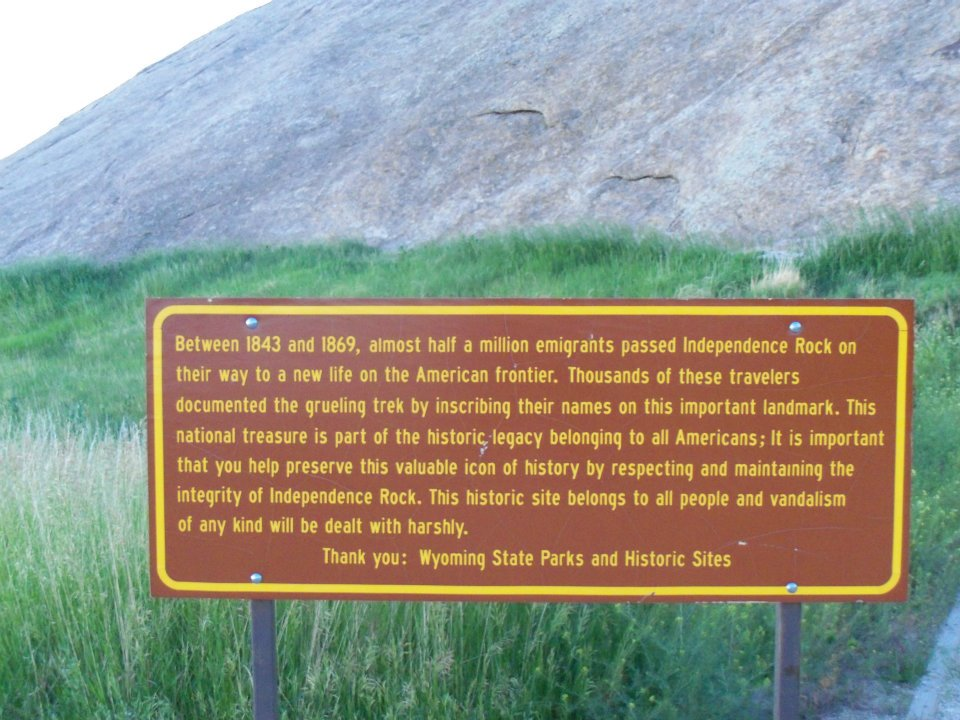
A sign in front of Independence Rock describing the history of the site, taken in 2011.

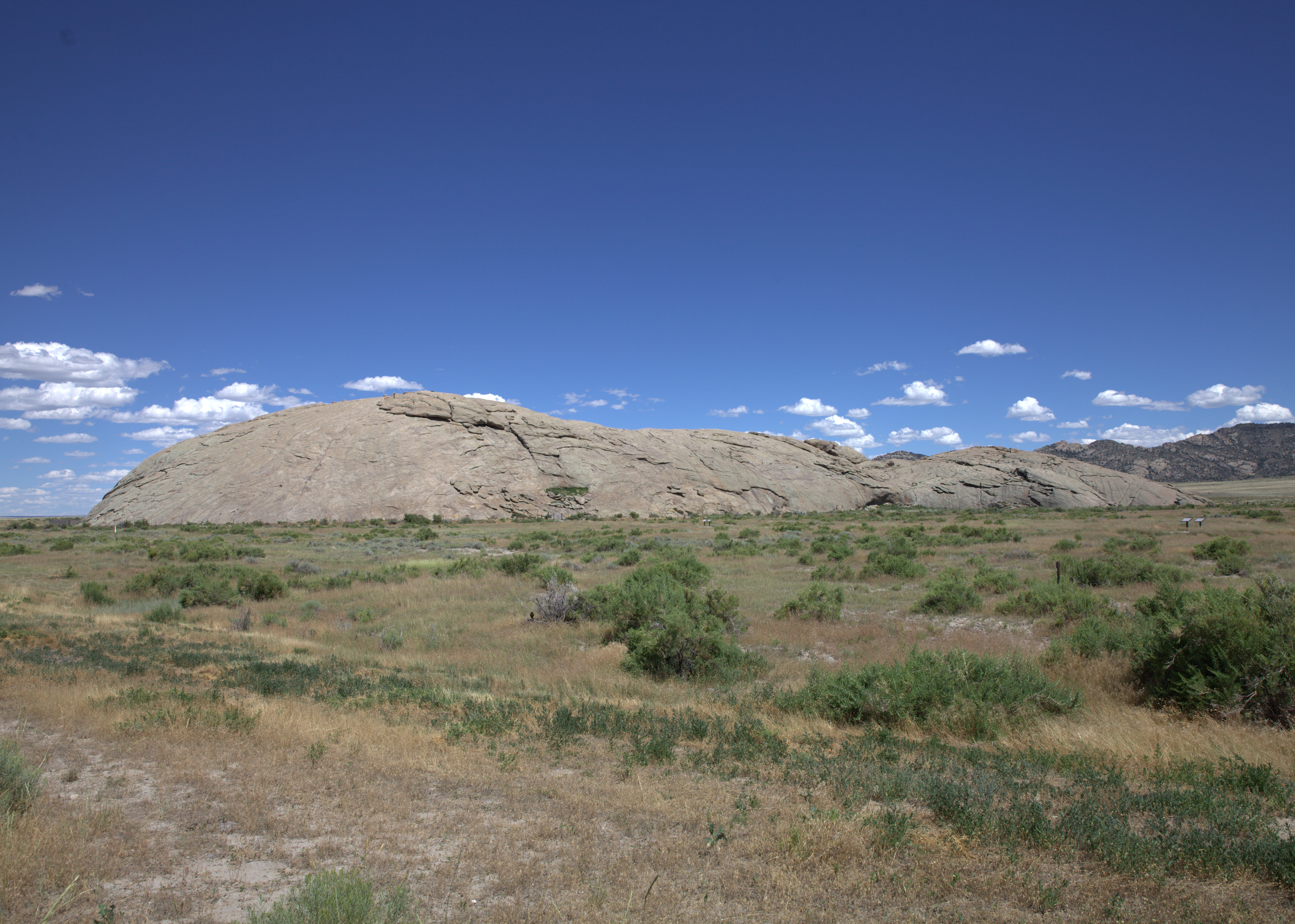
Independence Rock in 2015

== See also ==
- Wyoming Historical Landmarks
- List of the oldest buildings in Wyoming
