= STV Pathfinder =

- STV Pathfinder

History

Canada
- Builder: Kingston Shipyards, Kingston
- Laid down: 10 November 1962

General characteristics
- Tonnage: 31.36 GRT
- Displacement: 50 tons
- Length: 22 m (72 ft) LOA; 14 m (46 ft) WL; 20 m (66 ft) on deck
- Beam: 4.5 m (15 ft)
- Draft: 2.5 m (8 ft 2 in)
- Installed power: 110 kW (150 hp)
- Propulsion: sail; Volvo Penta TAMD41-H
- Sail plan: brigantine 250 m^{2} (2,700 sq ft)
- Speed: 8.2 kn (15.2 km/h; 9.4 mph) hull speed; 4–8 kn (7.4–14.8 km/h; 4.6–9.2 mph) (sail); 7 kn (13 km/h; 8.1 mph) (powered)
- Complement: 28

STV Pathfinder is a traditionally rigged brigantine operated by Brigs Youth Sail Training (formally Toronto Brigantine Inc.), a sail training organization based in Hamilton, Ontario, Canada. Pathfinder, along with her sister ship TS Playfair, operates a youth sail training program during the summer holidays. This program is one of the very few sail training programs where all of the crew except for the captain are teens (13–19 years old).

== Specifications ==
Designer	Francis A. MacLachlan
Hull	Welded steel (1/4" hull plating, 1/2" keel plating, frames every 2)
Freeboard	1.3 m (4.3')
Ballast	12 tons
Foremast height	16 m (52')
Mainmast height	16.5 m (54')
Sails	Jiptop, Jib, Foresail, Forecourse, Foretopsail, 2 Forecourse Studding Sails, 2 Foretopsail Studding Sails, Fisherman Staysail, Main Staysail, Mainsail, Main Gaff Topsail, Spritsail
Water tank	1200 litre (300 US gal)
Waste tank	800 litre (200 US gal)
Fuel tank	1800 litre (450 US gal)

== History ==
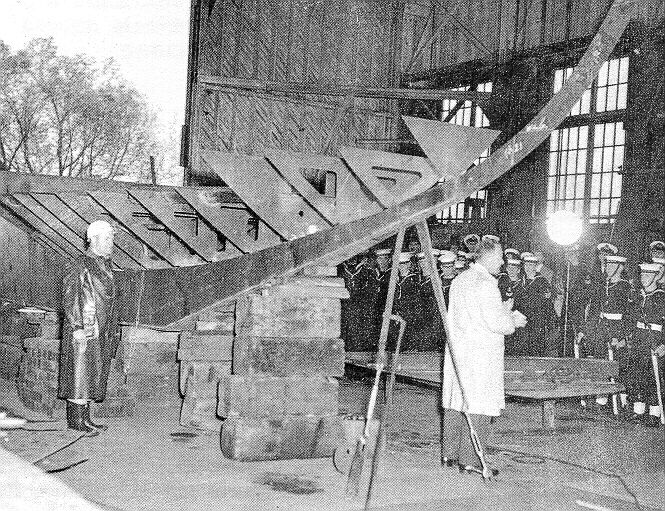
Pathfinder's Keel Ceremony, 10 November 1962

Pathfinder was built for the organization Toronto Brigantine Inc. (T.B.I.) from November 10, 1962, through 1963. She was constructed on the same plans of another sail training vessel based in Kingston named St. Lawrence II. Although hull and for the most part rig are almost identical, the interior of the two boats differs greatly. From construction until 2017 Pathfinder served as a sail training ship. The three sister ships sailed to New York City in 1976 to participate in the Tall Ships gathering of sail for the Bicentennial celebration. Pathfinder's last major re-fit was in 1994 when she was out of service for a year whilst the interior, exterior, all systems, machinery and rig of the vessel was completely re-furbished. The ship was retired from Toronto Brigantine's fleet and sold to a private buyer in 2018. She has since been returned to service alongside TS Playfair from her home port of Hamilton Ontario.

== Interior Layout ==
Pathfinder is divided into six watertight compartments from fore to aft the: forepeak (general bosun stores, anchor chain bins); petty officer's mess (sleeping space for 4 petty officers); seamen's mess (sleeping and living space for up to 18 trainees, also includes the galley); engine room (area for engine, generator and batteries); wardroom (sleeping and living space for 6 wardroom officers, also includes the captain's cabin, a separate but not watertight compartment)and the afterpeak (mooring line and fender storage and steering gear)
