= Three Forks, Wyoming =

Human settlement in United States of America

- Unincorporated community
- Location within Wyoming Location within the continental United States
- Coordinates: 42°21′45″N 107°26′41″W
- Country: United States
- State: Wyoming
- County: Carbon
- Elevation: 6,277 ft (1,913 m)
- Time zone: UTC−7 (MST)
  - Summer (DST): UTC−6 (MDT)
- GNIS pop ID: 1595534

Three Forks is an unincorporated community in Carbon County, Wyoming, United States.

Three forks, locally known as Three Forks Muddy Gap, was named from its location at a fork in the road. First settled in 1935 when Highway 287 was built. Local Rancher, Robert L. Tully built a small filling station. Then in his sixties, Tully decided to retire from ranching, selling off much of his original homestead to pay for the construction of the station.
