= Muddy Gap, Wyoming =

Unincorporated community in Carbon County, Wyoming

Coordinates: 42°21′06″N 107°27′26″W

Muddy Gap is an unincorporated community in Carbon County, Wyoming, United States. Muddy Gap and nearby Three Forks are sometimes referred to as one and the same place.

Muddy Gap is also the name of a natural gap nearby. Muddy Creek flows through the gap.
