= Sweetwater River (Wyoming) =

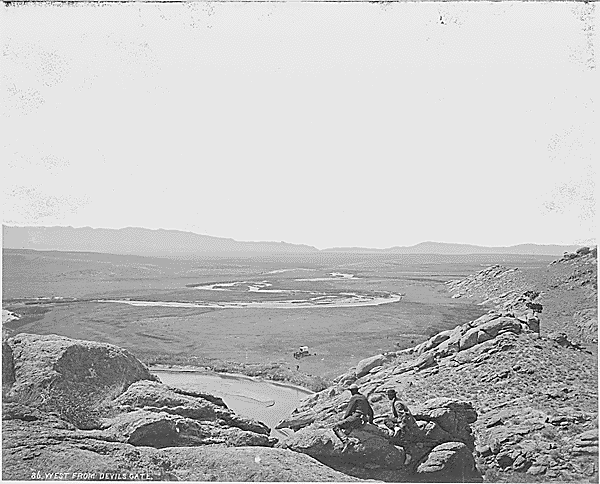
- 1870 photograph of the Sweetwater River.

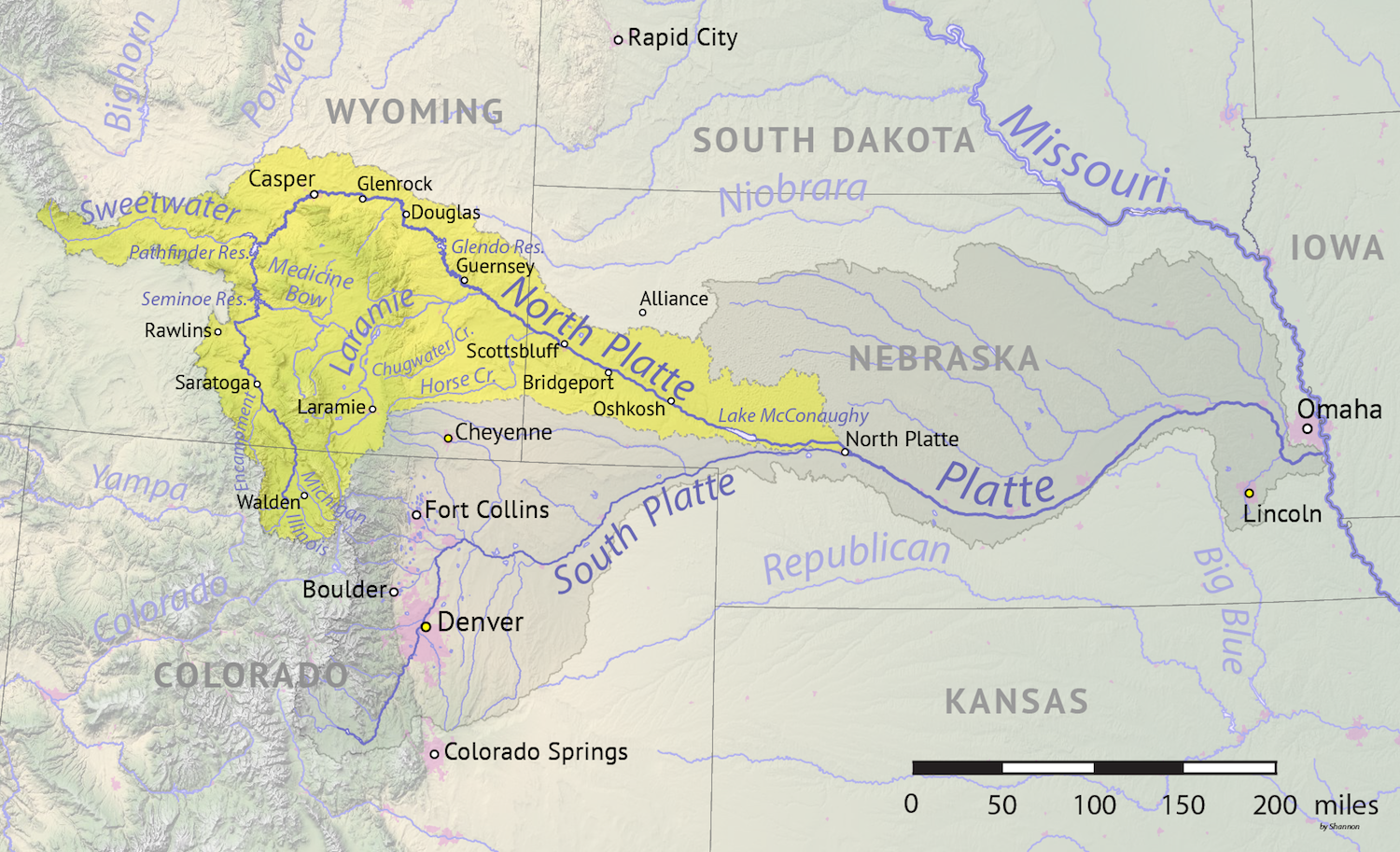
- North Platte, Sweetwater Rivers across Wyoming

Location
- Country: United States
- State: Wyoming
- Cities: Sweetwater Station, Jeffrey City

Physical characteristics
- Source: Sweetwater Gap
  - location: Wind River Range, Fremont County
  - coordinates: 42°39′15″N 109°03′25″W
  - elevation: 10,200 ft (3,100 m)
- Mouth: North Platte River
  - location: Pathfinder Reservoir, Natrona County
  - coordinates: 42°30′25″N 109°03′25″W
  - elevation: 5,853 ft (1,784 m)
- Length: 238 mi (383 km)
- Basin size: 2,880 sq mi (7,500 km^{2})
- Discharge
  - location: above Pathfinder Reservoir
  - average: 120.8 cu ft/s (3.42 m^{3}/s)
  - minimum: 0.5 cu ft/s (0.014 m^{3}/s)
  - maximum: 4,290 cu ft/s (121 m^{3}/s)

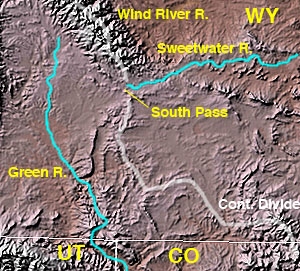
Sweetwater and Green River in Wyoming

The Sweetwater River is a 238-mile (383 km) long tributary of the North Platte River in the U.S. state of Wyoming. As a part of the Mississippi River system, its waters eventually reach the Gulf of Mexico.

== Course ==
The Sweetwater rises in southwestern Fremont County, at the continental divide near South Pass, Wyoming, on the southern end of the Wind River Range. It flows ENE along the north side of the Antelope Hills, then ESE, through Fremont County, past Jeffrey City, between the Granite Mountains to the north and the Green Mountains (Wyoming) to the south, through what are now cattle-raising areas. In southern Natrona County, it passes Devil's Gate and Independence Rock along the Oregon, California and Mormon Trails, and empties into the North Platte as the Sweetwater arm of Pathfinder Reservoir.

=== Sweetwater Canyon ===
The river passes through the 500-ft deep Sweetwater Canyon southeast of Atlantic City. In 1979, the National Park Service commissioned a study to investigate the feasibility of designating a 9.5-mile section of the river passing through the canyon as a Wild and Scenic River. The section was not designated, with the principal reason being a "failure to meet the minimum length criterion of 25 miles", despite there being no minimum length requirement for designation under the Wild and Scenic Rivers Act (Public Law 90-542).16 U.S.C. §§ 1271–1287 9,056 acres (3,665 ha) in and around the canyon eventually became a part of the Sweetwater Canyon Wilderness Study Area (WSA). In 2023, Senator John Barrasso introduced a bill to divide the WSA into upper and lower sections and protect them as wilderness areas. In 2025, Senator Barrasso introduced another bill with the same intent.

== History ==
The Sweetwater River valley provided a route used by fur trappers, mountain men, and fur traders as they went to their annual summertime Rocky Mountain Rendezvous located usually somewhere along the Green River in Wyoming. These trappers and traders soon established a path for their pack trains along the Sweetwater and eventually cleared a rough wagon trail to the Green River.

In the fall of 1823, trappers and fur traders Jedediah Smith and Thomas Fitzpatrick led their trapping crew south from the Yellowstone River to the Sweetwater River. They were looking for a safe location to spend the winter. Smith reasoned that since the Sweetwater flowed east, it must eventually run into the Missouri River. Trying to transport their extensive fur collection down the Sweetwater and North Platte River, they found after a near-disastrous canoe crash that the rivers in Wyoming were too swift and rough for water passage. On July 4, 1824, they cached their furs under a dome of rock they named Independence Rock and started their long trek on foot to the Missouri River via the Sweetwater, North Platte, and Platte River valleys. Upon arriving back in a settled area on the Missouri River, they bought pack horses (on credit) and retrieved their furs. They had rediscovered the route that Robert Stuart of the Astor Expedition had taken in 1813, eleven years before. Thomas Fitzpatrick was often hired as a trail guide when the fur trade almost ceased in 1840. Jedediah Smith was killed by Indians in 1831.

By 1843, the Sweetwater River valley had become a regular wagon trail, providing the water, grass, and fuel needed for the Oregon, California, and Mormon Trails across Wyoming. The Sweetwater provided an almost direct path from the Platte and North Platte Rivers to the wide South Pass Continental Divide between the Atlantic Ocean rivers and Pacific Ocean rivers. South Pass was the easiest pass across the Atlantic and Pacific drainages. These wagon trails crossed the meandering Sweetwater River about nine times on their about 10 to 20-day trips along the Sweetwater River before they reached South Pass. The Sweetwater River's connection to the California Trail is of particular interest to members of the Fraternity of Phi Gamma Delta, since it is a site where two early members met, including one of the fraternity's six founders. At a time when such a meeting was incredibly unlikely, the coincidence was so fortuitous as to be chronicled in the fraternity's history.

== See also ==
- List of rivers of Wyoming
- List of wilderness study areas
