= The Pathfinder (drink) =

Hemp non-alcoholic spirit

The Pathfinder Hemp & Root
- Type: Non-alcoholic spirit
- Origin: Pacific Northwest
- Introduced: 2021
- Proof (US): 0
- Flavor: Botanical
- Ingredients: Hemp, juniper, saffron, wormwood, angelica root, Douglas fir, orange peel, ginger, sage, sugar
- Website: drinkthepathfinder.com

The Pathfinder Hemp & Root is a hemp-infused non-alcoholic spirit. It has developed a cult following due its reputation and occasional scarcity.

== Description ==
The beverage is made using fermented hemp seeds, which are then distilled in 16th-century style copper pot stills. The process is similar to the creation of traditional spirits like whiskey or tequila, with hemp as a substitute for grain mash. The beverage is then infused with various botanicals, including juniper, saffron, wormwood, angelica root, Douglas fir, orange peel, ginger, and sage. A proprietary yeast strain is used to prevent the production of alcohol during the fermentation process. It contains no alcohol, THC, or CBD.

=== Serving ===
It is served both neat, on the rocks, or as a shot. It is also commonly used to add complex, bitter and botanical flavors to both alcoholic and non-alcoholic cocktails like whiskey sours, negronis, spritzes, and americanos. The beverage was included in Nicole Schaefer's Portland Cocktails: An Elegant Collection of Over 100 Recipes Inspired by the City of Roses.

In January 2025, the company released The Pathfinder Negroni, a premixed nonalcoholic cocktail containing Pathfinder.

== History ==
The brand was founded by Steven Grasse, founder of Quaker City Mercantile, Chris Abbott, founder of Mr. Moxey's Mints, and Guy Escolme, a former Diageo executive. The drink was developed as a distinct type of beverage based on ingredients found in the Pacific Northwest. It was inspired by the history of snake oil salesmen, apothecarial medicine (materia medica), and the occult in the Old West, which was considered the "Golden Age of Cannabis". The bottle and packaging was based on historical bottles of cannabis-based remedies with labels like "Pain Destroyer" that were sold in the Old West during the 19th century. The beverage was inspired by the botanical infusions and elixirs popular in that time period. It was intended to taste like a drink that "could have existed in like the 1850s" and includes ingredients with supposedly medicinal properties.

The beverage debuted at Life on Mars bar in the Capitol Hill neighborhood of Seattle in late 2021. It subsequently developed a cult following among bartenders. The high demand for the beverage created occasional scarcity, with Kirsten Fleming of the New York Post describing it as the "Pappy Van Winkle" of non-alcoholic beverages. Sarah Kate of Some Good Clean Fun described it as "one of the most popular and sought after non-alcoholic bottles in North America." In 2022, cocktail and mocktail workshops based on the beverage were hosted at Art in the Age in Philadelphia. As of 2024, it began to be distributed in the United Kingdom.

== Reception ==
Lee Sherman of The Alcohol Professor wrote that Pathfinder's bottle "is reminiscent of a bottle of snake oil from a bygone era and the earthy, smoky, woody smells when you lift the cap conjure mystery and adventure. This is poetry in a bottle."

It has been compared to amaro, sweet vermouth, and absinthe. Penelope Bass of Imbibe magazine compared the beverage's flavor to an amaro, while noting that its botanical ingredients closely resembled a traditional gin, and observed that its color was reminiscent of a cola. Adam Bloodworth of City A.M. described it as feeling "luxe", and wrote that "ginger, sage and saffron disrupt the cane sugar to create something like harmony." Christopher Null of Drinkhacker described it as "bittersweet, woodsy and a bit fruity," writing that "In a world of no-alcohol spirits that are largely duds, The Pathfinder greatly impresses."

In 2025, it was included in The New York Times list of "The Best Nonalcoholic Drinks", with journalist Mace Dent Johnson describing it as "strong, bracing, and surprising, with intense bitterness and a fresh pine aroma". Johnson noted that one of the Times' tasters commented that "I feel like I need to have tattoos to qualify to drink this." The beverage has also been associated with the rising popularity of non-alcoholic spirits, exemplified by movements like Dry January.
