= Pathfinder National Wildlife Refuge =

- IUCN category IV (habitat/species management area)
- Location within Wyoming Location within the United States
- Location: Natrona / Carbon counties, Wyoming, United States
- Nearest city: Casper, WY
- Coordinates: 42°29′16″N 106°58′47″W
- Area: 16,807 acres (6,802 ha)
- Established: 1909
- Governing body: U.S. Fish and Wildlife Service
- Website: Pathfinder National Wildlife Refuge

Pathfinder National Wildlife Refuge is located in the U.S. state of Wyoming and includes 16,807 acres (68 km^{2}). The refuge is managed by the U.S. Fish and Wildlife Service and the U.S. Bureau of Reclamation, both agencies within the U.S. Department of the Interior. The refuge is divided into four sections adjacent to Pathfinder Reservoir and includes three campgrounds and three boat ramps. It is located in southern Natrona and northern Carbon counties. Pathfinder NWR is managed from the Arapaho National Wildlife Refuge which is located in Colorado.

The reservoir is used by numerous migratory bird species. The Pronghorn is commonly found on the refuge.

Located 20 miles southwest of Alcova, Wyoming via Wyoming Highway 220.
