= Antelope Hills, Wyoming =

- CDP
- Location within the state of Wyoming
- Coordinates: 43°04′53″N 106°18′42″W
- Country: United States
- State: Wyoming
- County: Natrona

Area
  - Total: 13.4 sq mi (34.6 km^{2})
  - Land: 13.3 sq mi (34.5 km^{2})
  - Water: 0.039 sq mi (0.1 km^{2})
- Elevation: 5,722 ft (1,744 m)

Population (2010)
  - Total: 97
  - Density: 7.3/sq mi (2.8/km^{2})
- Time zone: UTC-7 (Mountain (MST))
  - Summer (DST): UTC-6 (MDT)
- Area code: 307
- FIPS code: 56-02877
- GNIS feature ID: 2407746

Antelope Hills is a census-designated place in Natrona County, Wyoming, United States. It is part of the Casper, Wyoming Metropolitan Statistical Area. The population was 97 at the 2010 census.

== Geography ==
According to the United States Census Bureau, the CDP has a total area of 13.4 square miles (34.6 km^{2}), of which 13.3 square miles (34.4 km^{2}) is land and 0.1 square mile (0.1 km^{2}) (0.37%) is water.

== Demographics ==
As of the census of 2000, there were 88 people, 36 households, and 21 families residing in the CDP. The population density was 6.6 people per square mile (2.6/km^{2}). There were 53 housing units at an average density of 4.0/sq mi (1.5/km^{2}). The racial makeup of the CDP was 95.45% White, 1.14% African American and 3.41% Native American.

There were 36 households, out of which 27.8% had children under the age of 18 living with them, 52.8% were married couples living together, 8.3% had a female householder with no husband present, and 38.9% were non-families. 30.6% of all households were made up of individuals, and 5.6% had someone living alone who was 65 years of age or older. The average household size was 2.44 and the average family size was 3.18.

In the CDP, the population was spread out, with 26.1% under the age of 18, 3.4% from 18 to 24, 19.3% from 25 to 44, 45.5% from 45 to 64, and 5.7% who were 65 years of age or older. The median age was 45 years. For every 100 females, there were 109.5 males. For every 100 females age 18 and over, there were 116.7 males.

The median income for a household in the CDP was $35,781, and the median income for a family was $36,719. Males had a median income of $28,250 versus $6,250 for females. The per capita income for the CDP was $14,464. There were no families and 12.8% of the population living below the poverty line, including no under eighteens and none of those over 64.
