= Granite Mountains (Wyoming) =

Mountain range in Wyoming, United States

Coordinates: 42°29′37″N 107°7′46″W

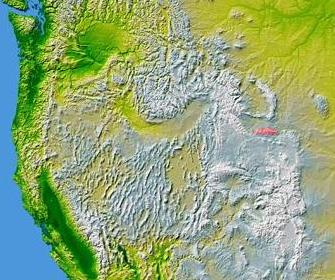
The Granite Mountains in Wyoming

The Granite Mountains are a short subrange of the Rocky Mountains in central Wyoming of the United States. The range runs approximately 100 mi (160 km) E-W along the south side of the Shoshone Basin, and north of the Sweetwater River, in eastern Fremont County and western Natrona County. The highest point is McIntosh Peak at 8,058 feet (2,456 m). Independence Rock is at the east end of the range, and Split Rock was a prominent landmark on the Oregon Trail. The region is rich in uranium and other mineral deposits.

== See also ==
- List of mountain ranges in Wyoming
