= Emery, Utah =

- Town
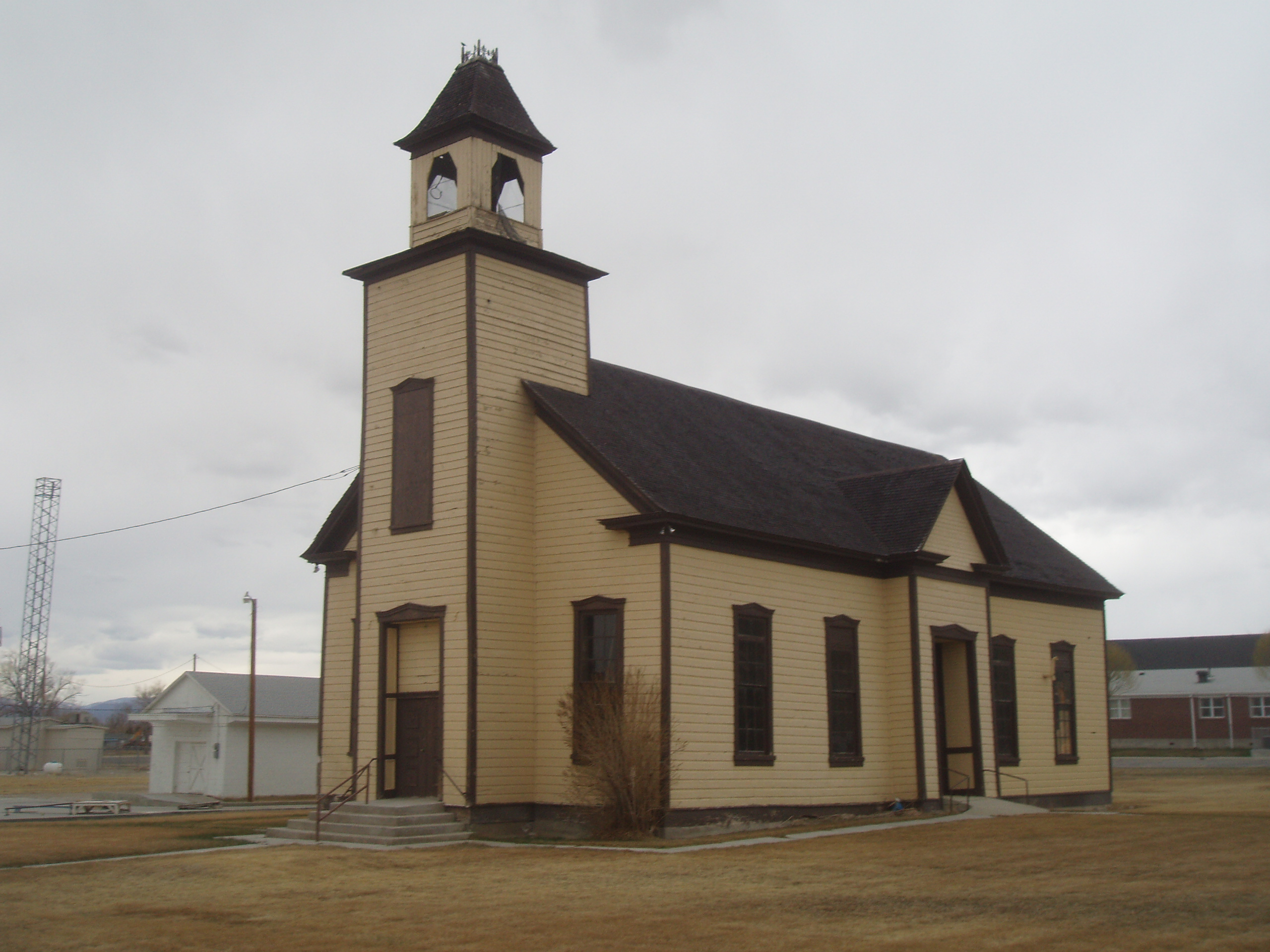
- Emery LDS Church, built 1898−1900, is the oldest surviving religious building in town.

- Location in Emery County and the state of Utah

- Location of Utah in the United States
- Coordinates: 38°55′20″N 111°14′58″W
- Country: United States
- State: Utah
- County: Emery
- Established: 1881
- Named for: George W. Emery

Government
  - Mayor: Amy Filipsic-Sundstrom

Area
  - Total: 1.23 sq mi (3.18 km^{2})
  - Land: 1.23 sq mi (3.18 km^{2})
  - Water: 0 sq mi (0.00 km^{2})
- Elevation: 6,253 ft (1,906 m)

Population (2020)
  - Total: 307
  - Density: 218.2/sq mi (84.24/km^{2})
- Time zone: UTC-7 (Mountain (MST))
  - Summer (DST): UTC-6 (MDT)
- ZIP code: 84522
- Area code: 435
- FIPS code: 49-22870
- GNIS feature ID: 1440926
- Website: emerytownutah.gov

Emery is a town in Emery County, Utah, United States. The population was 307 at the 2020 census.

== History ==
=== Prehistoric ===
Emery sits at the base of the mountains that contain the North Horn Formation. Named after North Horn Mountain, near Castle Dale, this formation in Emery County contain numerous Cretaceous- and Tertiary-era fossil invertebrates, microfossils and palynomorphs. Flagstaff Peak, north of Emery, has abundant dinosaur bone material, prehistoric mammal remains, and petrified dinosaur footprints. The elevation is around 7000

=== Fremont people, the Old Spanish Trail, and exploration ===
The Fremont culture or Fremont people is a pre-Columbian archaeological culture who existed in the area from AD 700 to 1300. It was adjacent to, roughly contemporaneous with, but distinctly different from the Ancestral Pueblo peoples. The culture received its name from the Fremont River, where the first Fremont sites were discovered. The Fremont River in Utah flows from the Johnson Valley Reservoir near Fish Lake east through Capitol Reef National Park to Muddy Creek, whose headwaters begin just north of Emery.

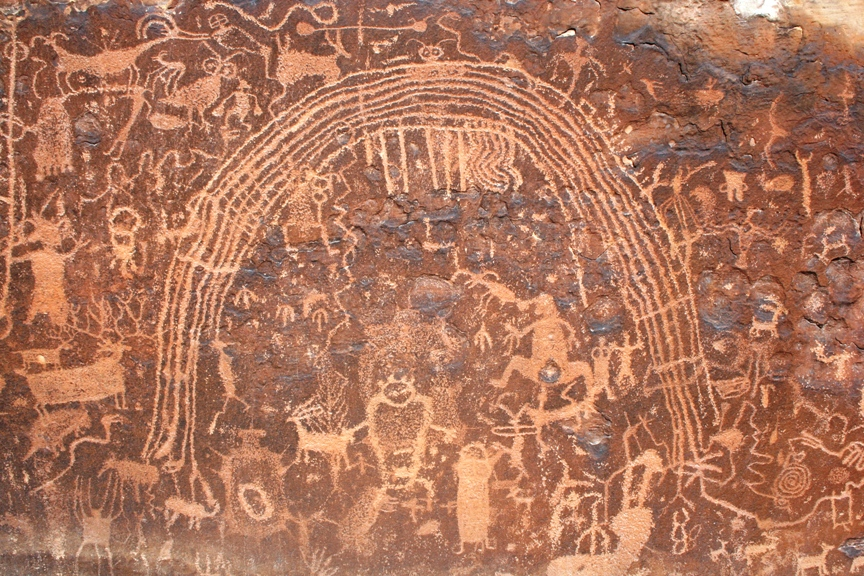
The Rochester Panel located northeast of Emery

Two significant Fremont culture sites are located north and south of the town. Artifacts such as pottery, manos and metates (millingstones), and weaponry have been found along Muddy and Ivie creeks. Coil pottery, which is most often used to identify archaeological sites as Fremont, is not very different from that made by other Southwestern groups, nor are its vessel forms and designs distinct. What distinguishes Fremont pottery from other ceramic types is the material from which it is constructed. Variations in temper, the granular rock or sand added to wet clay to ensure even drying and to prevent cracking, have been used to identify five major Fremont ceramic types. They include Snake Valley gray in the southwestern part of the Fremont region, Sevier gray in the central area, the Great Salt Lake gray in the northwestern area, and Uinta and Emery gray in the northeast and southwestern regions. Sevier, Snake Valley, and Emery gray also occur in painted varieties. A unique and beautiful painted bowl form, Ivie Creek black-on-white, is found along either side of the southern Wasatch Plateau. In addition to these five major types found at Fremont villages, a variety of locally made pottery wares are found on the fringes of the Fremont region in areas occupied by people who seem to have been principally hunters and gatherers rather than farmers. The Rochester Rock Art Panel 3 miles (5 km) west of Emery is a significant rock art panel left by the Fremont People and has been the target of vandalism and relic thieves.

The earliest known entrance into the region known as Castle Valley by Europeans dates back to the Spanish explorers. The oldest names in Emery County are Spanish, not Native American — San Rafael, Sinbad, and probably Castle Valley itself are landmarks of that era when Spanish padres, Spanish American explorers, fur traders, trappers, and frontiersmen followed the Old Spanish Trail through Emery. From about 1776 to the mid-1850s, the Old Spanish Trail came up from Santa Fe, New Mexico, crossed the Colorado River at Moab, then the Green River where the city of Green River now stands, across the San Rafael desert into Castle Valley, then crossed along the eastern part of the town. This became the established route of the Spanish slave traders who captured indigenous people along the route and were selling them as slaves.

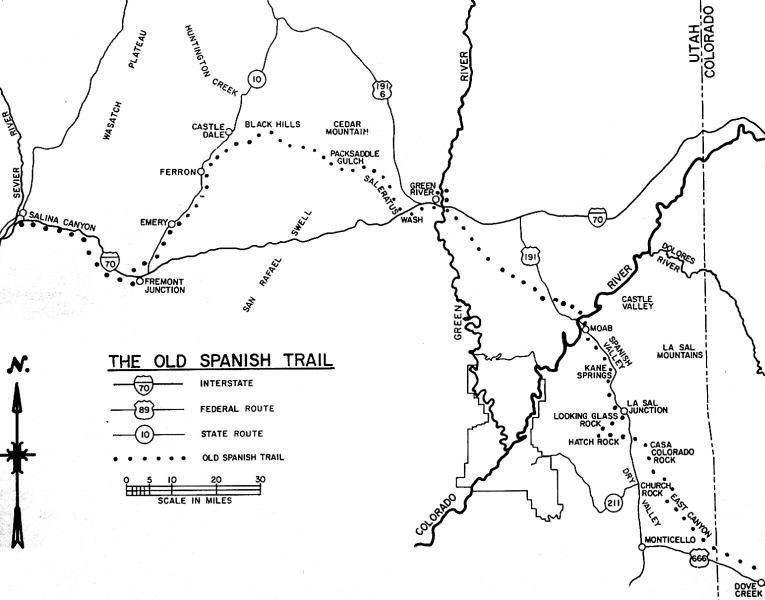
Map of the Old Spanish Trail through eastern Utah

A sizable herd of feral horses is managed east of Emery. These wild horses and burros have occupied the San Rafael Swell area since the beginning of the Old Spanish Trail in the early 19th century. Early travelers would lose animals or have them run off by native Americans or rustlers. Many of these animals were headed for California to be traded and sold and were of good stock. The herd was also augmented by releasing domestic horses from local ranches. By the early 20th century, wild horse and burro numbers had soared and were captured and sold by local mustangers. This continued until the passage of the Wild and Free-Roaming Horses and Burros Act of 1971. Since the passage of this act, the horses and burros have been managed under federal law and Bureau of Land Management regulation.

In the summer of 1853, Captain John W. Gunnison was sent by the War Department of the United States to explore a railroad route to the Pacific coast. Lt. E. G. Beckwith assisted him. They entered Castle Valley and passed near the town in October 1853. Gunnison described the area as follows: "Except three or four small cottonwood trees, there is not a tree to be seen by the unassisted eye on any part of the horizon. The plain lying between us and the Wasatch Range, one hundred miles to the west, is a series of rocky, parallel chasms, and fantastic sandstone ridges. On the north, Roan Cliffs, ten miles from us, present bare masses miles back, a few scattering cedars may be distinguished with the glass. The surface around is whitened with fields of alkali resembling fields of snow. Unless this interior country possesses undiscovered minerals of great value, it can contribute but the merest trifle towards the maintenance of a railroad through it after it has been constructed."

=== Settlement ===
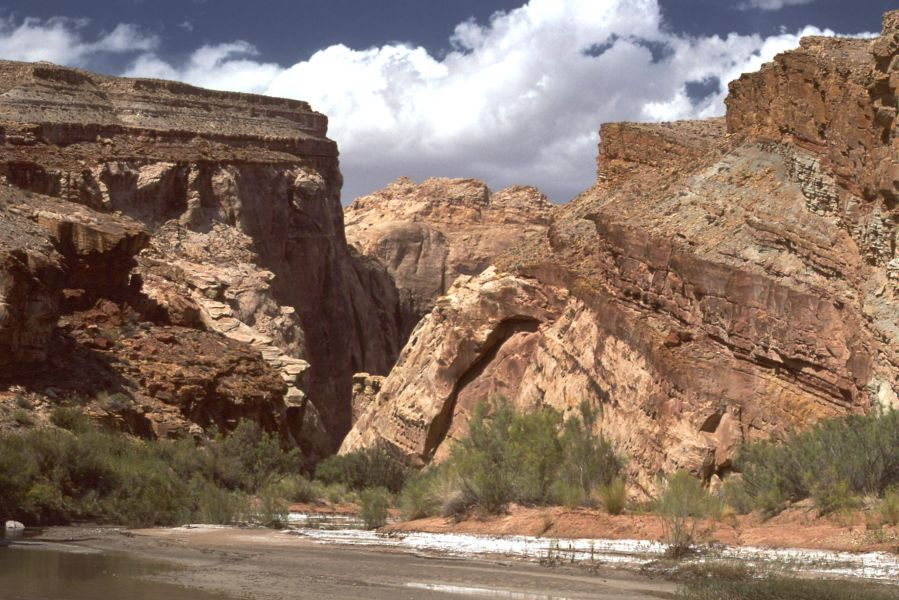
Muddy Creek Gorge, east of Emery in the San Rafael Swell

One folk story about the settlement goes as follows. It is said a group of pioneers were traveling through the area. A strong wind storm appeared, and they agreed to stop until it died down. The wind never stopped in time, and ultimately decided to settle there. This story is likely a joke about the prominent wind noted by residents.

The first settlers to Emery came from Sanpete County, Utah. This is unusually notable as the settlers headed east instead of the west (like most settlers at the time), even if it was over a mountain range. The first attempt at settlement was made at Muddy Creek, a stream following down a wide canyon and eventually emptying into the Dirty Devil River. The Muddy Creek vegetation included tall grass, sage, greasewood, rabbit brush, tender shad scale or Castle Valley clover, prickly pear cacti, and yucca. Along the creek banks were giant cottonwood trees and patches of huge thorny bushes with long needle-sharp spines called bull berry bushes. These berries, when beaten off onto a canvas, could be dried, made into jams, jellies, or even eaten raw.

Among these early settlers were Charles Johnson, Marenus, and Joseph Lund families. Casper Christensen and Fred Acord also brought their families and began to build cabins and plant crops. Joseph Lund, the first to build a small one-room log cabin with a lean-to, became discouraged and left it for Casper Christensen (this building still survives and has been restored and relocated to This Is the Place Heritage Park in Salt Lake City). Most travels came by way of Salina Canyon and Spring Canyon, which weren't much more than deer trails. Roads were bad at best and almost impassable most of the time. The modes of travel were by horseback, team, and wagon or on snowshoes in wintertime.

Another company settled farther up the canyon around this same date—families who came from Beaver, Mayfield, and Sterling. They called themselves "The Beaver Brothers". Among these were Dan, Miles, and Samuel Miller, George Collier, Samuel Babbett and others. Some of these became discouraged and left the first year. The Millers moved farther down the lower part of the Muddy Creek canyon. This part has been called Miller's Canyon ever since that time.

Several miles south, on Quitchupah Creek, several families were trying to homestead on land that was more barren than Muddy Creek. In the 1870s, Brigham Young called on several families from Sanpete County to settle on Muddy Creek. Most of the first homes on Muddy Creek were called a dugout. It was a room dug in the side of a hill or the bank of a wash. The front was very crude, sometimes the only door being a blanket hung over the opening, or a rough wooden door, hung with leather hinges. The windows were small openings made in the front wall and covered with heavy greased paper or white canvas. Each had a fireplace in one end, which served for heat, cooking and light. The heat from the fire made the dugout unbearably hot in summer, so then the cooking was done on an open fire outside. The roof of the dugout was made of poles, covered with willows and dirt. These roofs served well in dry weather, as they were warm and kept out the wind. However, they leaked badly in stormy weather. Another great inconvenience of these roofs was that they were a home for snakes, rats, mice and spiders. The floors were usually dirt or sometimes rock.

During the years from 1882 to 1885 quite a number of families moved into the Muddy Creek area. A few of them were Jedediah Knight, Joseph Nielson, Pleasant Minchey, Frank Foote, Charley and Ammon Foote, George Merrick, Oscar Beebe, Orson Davis, Heber C. K. Petty, Sr., Joseph Evans, Rasmus Johnson, Carl Magnus Olsen, Peter Nielson, Peter Hansen, Heber Broderick, Peter Christensen, George A. Whitlock, Peter Victor Bunderson, Rasmus Albrechtsen, Christian A. Larsen, Lafe Allred, Hyrum Strong, Peter Jensen, Isaac Kimball, William George Petty, Niels Jensen, Wiley Payne Allred, Andrew C. Anderson, Stephen Williams and David Pratt. Most of these families were Danish immigrants. By 1885, it was determined that the canyon itself was not wide enough for many farms and that more fertile land lay to the south of the Muddy.

The settling of this land required bringing the waters of Muddy Creek through a tunnel that took nearly three years to dig. With no trained engineering assistance, the settlers made their calculations, started from opposite sides of the hill, dodged numerous cave-ins of the treacherous Mancos shale, maintained the correct level inside the tunnel, and connected both tunnels nearly perfectly.

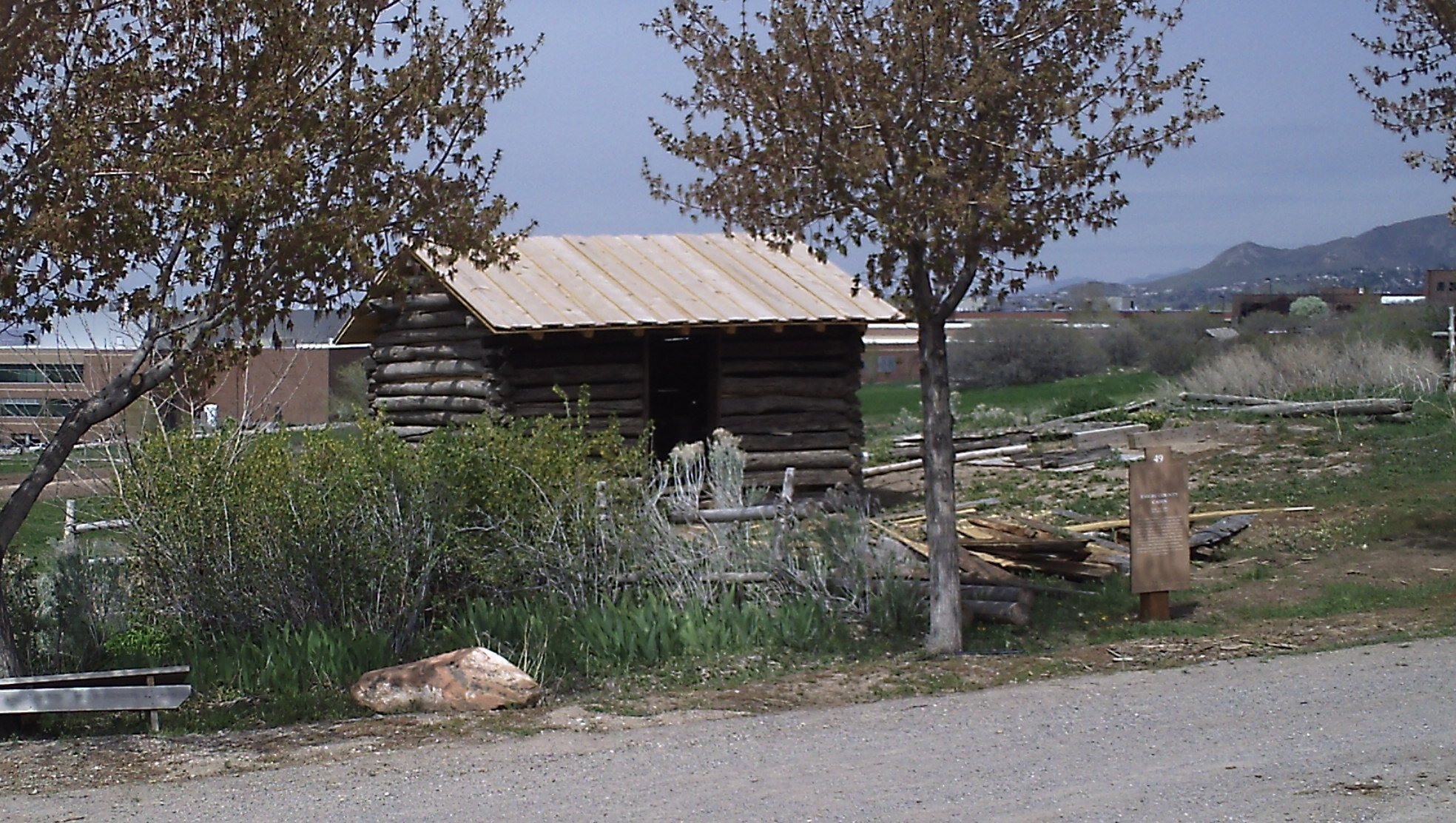
The earliest remaining building from Emery, relocated to This Is the Place Heritage Park in Salt Lake City

1883 was a red-letter year for Casper Christensen. On April 15, he was set apart as the Presiding Elder of the Muddy Creek Branch of the Church of Jesus Christ of Latter-day Saints. On August 26, his daughter, Bellette, was born, the first baby girl to be born on the Muddy Creek. On September 2, the Emery Ward was organized with Casper Christensen as bishop. Then on November 19, he was officially appointed postmaster at Muddy, in the County of Emery in the Utah Territory. His daughter, Hannah, was appointed as his assistant.

When Casper Christensen was first appointed postmaster and bishop, a postal inspector found him working in the field and tried to make him understand that he wanted to inspect his postal records. Finally, in desperation, he said, "You don't seem to know who I am. I am a postal inspector." Brother Casper indignantly replied, "And YOU don't know who I am. I'm the Bishop on the Creek!" Town residents have continued to use this phrase when dealing with someone who was self-important.

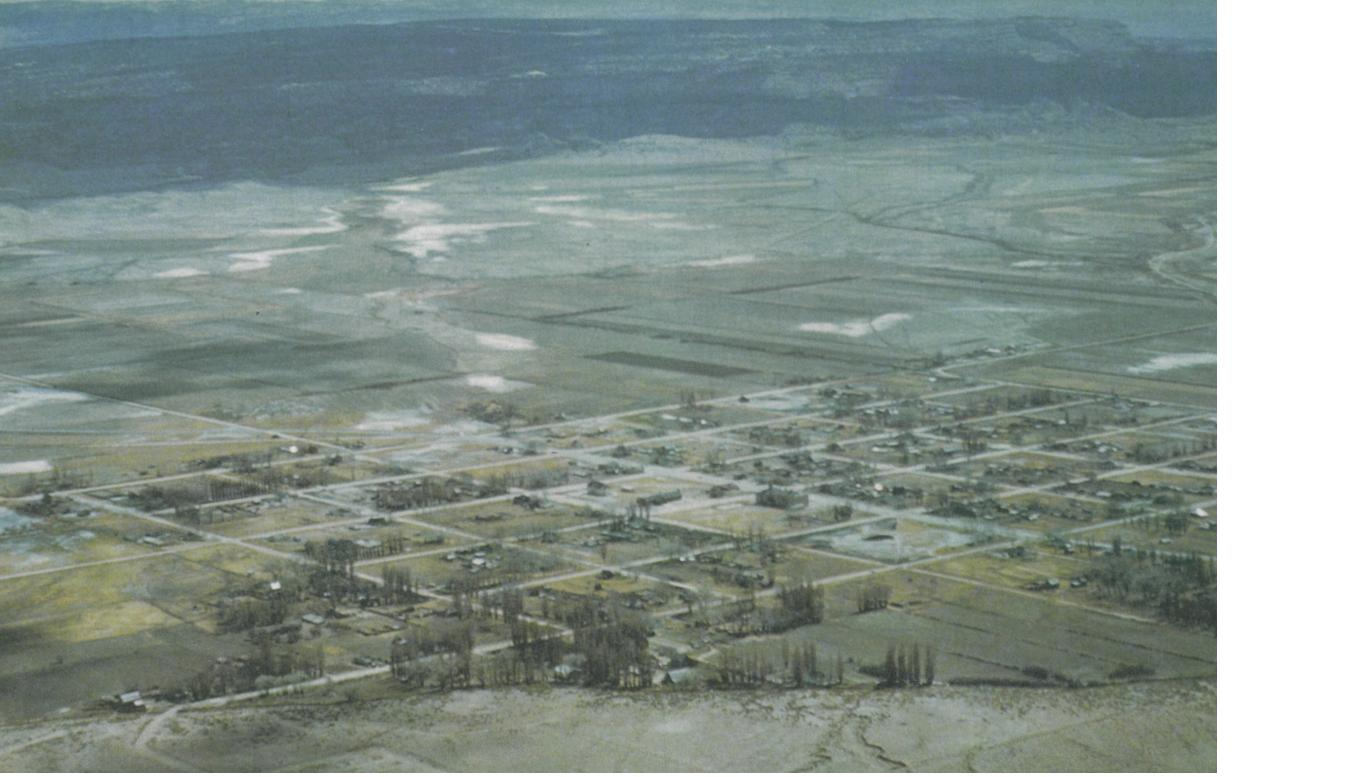
The town of Emery, circa 1950, taken from "the Mountain" northwest of the town

Muddy Creek and Quitchupah residents consolidated on this new townsite. Log cabins were built as soon as logs could be hauled from the nearby mountains. The logs were smoothed on one side with grooves chopped in each end. They were then placed on top of each other with the smooth side facing inward. Chinks between the logs were filled with mud or clay. Willows were used for lath, nailed to the logs, and plastered with mud. This mud was then rubbed smooth and painted with a whitewash of lime. The roofs were made of rough lumber and covered with a layer of straw or brush and then a top layer of dirt. Later the roofs were greatly improved when cedar shingles became available.

The town of Muddy would later change to "Emery", after Governor George W. Emery. However, both names would be synonymously used. Emery has always been an agricultural community. Ranching and farming are their major livelihood. The town would swell in population to have its own school, but after World War II, the population decreased due to a lack of economic opportunities and generally hovered around 300 residents. The discovery of coal south of the town led to several mines being developed and the idea that the town could once again draw in new residents. However, with the decrease in coal prices, production has not required the initiation of new mining operations.

On November 2, 1967, the Last Chance Motel was destroyed by a cone-shaped F2 tornado. Furniture and bedding were thrown hundreds of yards. The tornado occurred at the unusual time of 5:30 am, and no injuries were reported.

== Geography and climate ==
Emery is in western Emery County along Utah State Route 10, which leads northeast 25 miles (40 km) to Castle Dale, the county seat, and southwest 12 miles (19 km) to Interstate 70.

According to the United States Census Bureau, the town has a total area of 1.2 square miles (3.0 km^{2}), all land.

Selina 24 E is a nearby weather station.

Climate data for Salina 24 E, Utah, 1991–2020 normals, 1986-2020 extremes: 7560ft (2304m)
Month	Jan	Feb	Mar	Apr	May	Jun	Jul	Aug	Sep	Oct	Nov	Dec	Year
Record high °F (°C)	58 (14)	57 (14)	69 (21)	74 (23)	87 (31)	90 (32)	93 (34)	92 (33)	90 (32)	78 (26)	64 (18)	57 (14)	93 (34)
Mean maximum °F (°C)	46.0 (7.8)	48.6 (9.2)	58.8 (14.9)	67.7 (19.8)	75.6 (24.2)	84.5 (29.2)	87.1 (30.6)	84.7 (29.3)	79.9 (26.6)	69.9 (21.1)	56.0 (13.3)	46.9 (8.3)	88.0 (31.1)
Mean daily maximum °F (°C)	32.6 (0.3)	34.7 (1.5)	43.5 (6.4)	50.2 (10.1)	61.1 (16.2)	73.3 (22.9)	79.6 (26.4)	77.0 (25.0)	68.7 (20.4)	55.4 (13.0)	41.1 (5.1)	31.6 (−0.2)	54.1 (12.3)
Daily mean °F (°C)	24.2 (−4.3)	26.2 (−3.2)	33.7 (0.9)	39.4 (4.1)	48.8 (9.3)	59.3 (15.2)	66.3 (19.1)	64.1 (17.8)	55.7 (13.2)	44.0 (6.7)	31.7 (−0.2)	23.3 (−4.8)	43.1 (6.2)
Mean daily minimum °F (°C)	15.8 (−9.0)	17.7 (−7.9)	23.9 (−4.5)	28.7 (−1.8)	36.6 (2.6)	45.3 (7.4)	53.1 (11.7)	51.1 (10.6)	42.7 (5.9)	32.6 (0.3)	22.3 (−5.4)	15.1 (−9.4)	32.1 (0.0)
Mean minimum °F (°C)	−0.9 (−18.3)	2.0 (−16.7)	9.2 (−12.7)	16.3 (−8.7)	23.6 (−4.7)	32.8 (0.4)	44.6 (7.0)	42.4 (5.8)	30.6 (−0.8)	19.4 (−7.0)	7.1 (−13.8)	−1.8 (−18.8)	−5.2 (−20.7)
Record low °F (°C)	−14 (−26)	−19 (−28)	−5 (−21)	4 (−16)	10 (−12)	19 (−7)	27 (−3)	33 (1)	20 (−7)	2 (−17)	−2 (−19)	−15 (−26)	−19 (−28)
Average precipitation inches (mm)	0.93 (24)	1.03 (26)	1.07 (27)	0.99 (25)	1.22 (31)	0.73 (19)	1.15 (29)	1.49 (38)	1.40 (36)	1.32 (34)	0.97 (25)	1.02 (26)	13.32 (340)
Average snowfall inches (cm)	11.80 (30.0)	15.50 (39.4)	8.80 (22.4)	4.40 (11.2)	1.70 (4.3)	0.30 (0.76)	0.00 (0.00)	0.00 (0.00)	0.00 (0.00)	2.80 (7.1)	7.80 (19.8)	16.20 (41.1)	69.3 (176.06)
Source 1: NOAA
Source 2: XMACIS2 (records & monthly max/mins)

Climate data for Emery, Utah
Month	Jan	Feb	Mar	Apr	May	Jun	Jul	Aug	Sep	Oct	Nov	Dec	Year
Record high °F (°C)	63 (17)	68 (20)	81 (27)	85 (29)	95 (35)	100 (38)	100 (38)	102 (39)	99 (37)	88 (31)	71 (22)	64 (18)	102 (39)
Mean daily maximum °F (°C)	37 (3)	43 (6)	53 (12)	61 (16)	71 (22)	82 (28)	88 (31)	86 (30)	77 (25)	65 (18)	49 (9)	39 (4)	63 (17)
Mean daily minimum °F (°C)	12 (−11)	18 (−8)	27 (−3)	34 (1)	43 (6)	52 (11)	58 (14)	56 (13)	47 (8)	36 (2)	23 (−5)	14 (−10)	35 (2)
Record low °F (°C)	−17 (−27)	−15 (−26)	1 (−17)	13 (−11)	22 (−6)	28 (−2)	39 (4)	33 (1)	22 (−6)	8 (−13)	−4 (−20)	−21 (−29)	−21 (−29)
Average precipitation inches (mm)	0.66 (17)	0.64 (16)	0.74 (19)	0.51 (13)	0.74 (19)	0.41 (10)	1.04 (26)	0.97 (25)	1.02 (26)	0.98 (25)	0.57 (14)	0.39 (9.9)	8.64 (219)

== Demographics ==
Historical population
Census	Pop.	Note	%±
1890	240		—
1900	572		138.3%
1910	525		−8.2%
1920	650		23.8%
1930	657		1.1%
1940	618		−5.9%
1950	488		−21.0%
1960	326		−33.2%
1970	216		−33.7%
1980	372		72.2%
1990	300		−19.4%
2000	308		2.7%
2010	288		−6.5%
2020	307		6.6%
U.S. Decennial Census

As of the census of 2000, there were 308 people, 123 households, and 89 families residing in the town. The population density was 253.7 people per square mile (98.3/km^{2}). There were 140 housing units at an average density of 115.3 per square mile (44.7/km^{2}). The racial makeup of the town was 97.73% White, 0.97% Native American, and 1.30% from two or more races. Hispanic or Latino of any race were 0.97% of the population.

There were 123 households, out of which 29.3% had children under the age of 18 living with them, 61.0% were married couples living together, 6.5% had a female householder with no husband present, and 27.6% were non-families. 26.8% of all households were made up of individuals, and 12.2% had someone living alone who was 65 years or older. The average household size was 2.50, and the average family size was 3.03.

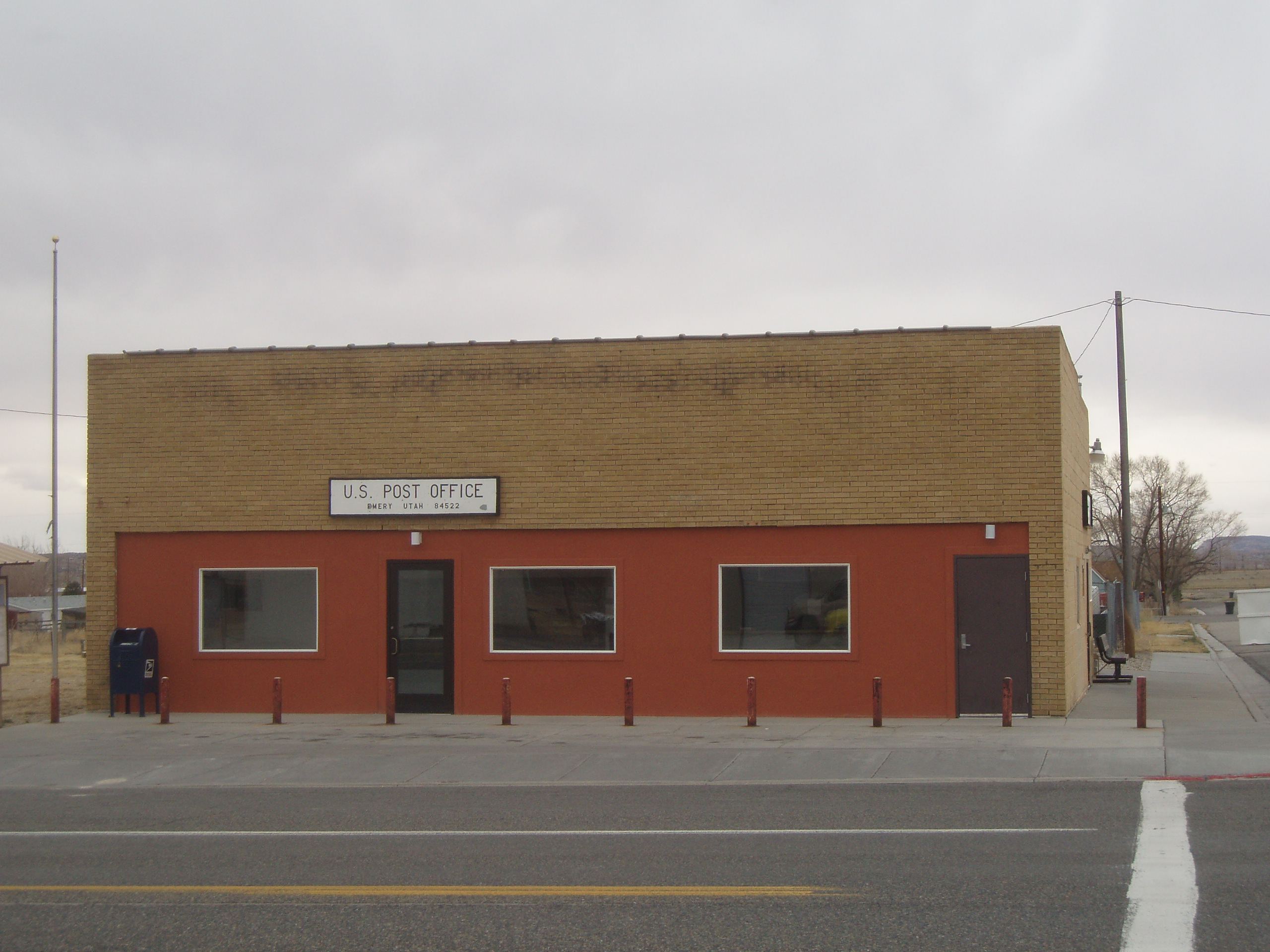
Current Emery Post Office

In the town, the population was spread out, with 28.9% under 18, 5.8% from 18 to 24, 19.2% from 25 to 44, 24.4% from 45 to 64, and 21.8% who were 65 years of age or older. The median age was 43 years. For every 100 females, there were 98.7 males. For every 100 females aged 18 and over, there were 97.3 males.

The median income for a household in the town was $40,469, and the median income for a family was $51,875. Males had a median income of $40,104 versus $31,250 for females. The per capita income was $17,195. About 12.1% of families and 13.1% of the population were below the poverty line, including 14.3% of those under eighteen and 19.3% of those 65 or over.

Emery is also the county with the fewest people who believe in climate change (49%)

== Notable person ==
- Clay Christiansen, composer, famed organist for the Mormon Tabernacle Choir

== See also ==
- List of cities and towns in Utah
- Emery County Cabin
- Emery LDS Church
