= Stanley B. Kimball =

Stanley Buchholz Kimball (November 25, 1926 – May 15, 2003) was a historian at Southern Illinois University. He was an expert on eastern European history and also wrote on Latter-day Saint history, including his ancestor Heber C. Kimball and the Mormon Trail.

== Biography ==
Kimball was raised in Farmington, Utah, until he was in junior high school when he moved to Denver, Colorado.

During World War II Kimball served briefly with the United States Army Air Forces at Sheppard Field, Texas.

As a member of the Church of Jesus Christ of Latter-day Saints (LDS Church), Kimball served as a missionary in Czechoslovakia starting in 1948. When the missionaries were expelled from the country in 1950, he was relocated to England with Stayner Richards as his mission president.

Kimball returned home and completed his B.A. and M.A. from the University of Denver. Kimball then became a director of an art center in Winston-Salem, North Carolina. While living in Winston-Salem he married Violet Tew, with whom he would have four children. He then went to Columbia University where he earned a Ph.D. in history, doing his dissertation on the Czech National Theatre in America.

In 1959, Kimball settled in the St. Louis, Missouri area and began teaching at Southern Illinois University Edwardsville (SIUE). He would teach there for 41 years, until his 2001 retirement. Before SIUE, he taught as a student or during summers at schools such as Columbia University, College of the City of New York, Brigham Young University, and Washington University in St. Louis.

After retirement, Kimball moved to St. George, Utah for medical reasons. Two years later, in 2003, Kimball died of cancer at the age of 76.

== Honors ==
- 1981 Best Book Award from the Mormon History Association for Heber C. Kimball: Mormon Patriarch and Pioneer.
- 1982 Special commendation from the National Park Service for his work on the Mormon Pioneer Historic Trail.
- 1984 President of the Mormon History Association.
- 1991 Grace Fort Arrington Award for historical excellence from the Mormon History Association.

== Writings ==
=== Books ===
- Oscarson, R. Don; Stanley B. Kimball; Leslie F. Medley (1965). The Travelers Guide to Historic Mormon America. Salt Lake City: Bookcraft.
- Kimball, Stanley B. (1973). The Austro-Slav Revival: A Study of Nineteenth-Century Literary Foundations. Philadelphia: American Philosophical Society. ISBN 0-87169-634-7.
- Knight, Hal; Stanley B. Kimball (1978). 111 Days to Zion. Robert R. Noyce (illustration); Richard F. Carter (maps). Salt Lake City: Deseret News. ISBN 0-9656694-0-8.
- Kimball, Stanley B. (1979). Discovering Mormon Trails: New York to California, 1831-1868. Diane Clements (cartography). Salt Lake City: Deseret Book. ISBN 978-0877477563. OCLC 5614526.
- —— (1981). Heber C. Kimball: Mormon Patriarch and Pioneer. Urbana: University of Illinois Press. ISBN 0-252-00854-5.
- Clayton, William (1983). Stanley B. Kimball (ed.). The Latter-day Saints' Emigrants' Guide. Gerald, Missouri: Patrice Press. ISBN 0-935284-27-3.
- Kimball, Heber C. (1987). Stanley B. Kimball (ed.). On the Potter's Wheel: The Diaries of Heber C. Kimball. Salt Lake City: Signature Books and Smith Research Associates. ISBN 0-941214-60-5. Archived from the original on 2010-07-07.
- Kimball, Stanley B. (1988). Historic Sites and Markers Along the Mormon and Other Great Western Trails. Urbana: University of Illinois Press. ISBN 0-252-01455-3.
- —— (1991). Historic Resource Study: Mormon Pioneer National Historic Trail. Washington, D.C.: United States Department of the Interior, National Park Service. Archived from the original on July 3, 2007.
- ——; Violet T. Kimball; Gary Ladd (1995). Mary L. Van Camp (ed.). Mormon Trail: Voyage of Discovery. Las Vegas, Nevada: KC Publications. ISBN 0-88714-092-0.
- —— (1996). The Mormon Battalion on the Santa Fe Trail in 1846: A Study of the Mormon Battalion Trail Accounts During the War with Mexico. Washington, D.C.: United States Department of the Interior.
- —— (1997). The Mormon Pioneer Trail: MTA 1997 Official Guide. Salt Lake City, Utah: Mormon Trails Association. ISBN 0-87905-263-5.

=== Articles ===
- Kimball, Stanley B. (Spring 1970). "The Mormons in Early Illinois: An Introduction". Dialogue: A Journal of Mormon Thought. 5 (1): 9–12. doi:10.2307/45224148. JSTOR 45224148. S2CID 254386636.
- —— (Spring 1970). "The Anthon Transcript: People, Primary Sources, and Problems". BYU Studies. 10 (3): 325–352.
- —— (June 1972). "The Iowa Trek of 1846: The Brigham Young Route from Nauvoo to Winter Quarters". Ensign: 36.
- —— (April 1973). "Discovery: 'Nauvoo' Found in Seven States". Ensign: 21.
- —— (January 1979). "The First Road West: From New York to Kirtland, 1831". Ensign: 29.
- —— (April 1979). "Zion's Camp March from Ohio to Missouri, 1834". Ensign: 45.
- —— (July 1979). "The Mormon Battalion March, 1846–47". Ensign: 57.
- —— (August 1979). "Two More Mormon Trails: The Boonslick Trail; The Mississippi Saints' Trail". Ensign: 49.
- —— (September 1979). "The Mormon Pioneer Trail, 1846–47". Ensign: 72–76.
- —— (January 1980). "Eastern Ends of the Trail West". Ensign: 30.
- —— (February 1980). "A Forgotten Trail and Mormon Settlements". Ensign: 33.
- —— (August 1981). "Kinderhook Plates Brought to Joseph Smith Appear to Be a Nineteenth-Century Hoax". Ensign: 66.
- —— (June 1984). "Another Route to Zion: Rediscovering the Overland Trail". Ensign: 34.
- —— (Fall 1988). "The Nauvoo Mission of the Methodist Episcopal Church, 1846–1848". Western Illinois Regional Studies. 11 (2): 46–54.
- —— (June 1994). "Heber C. Kimball's Domestic Life Reconsidered: An Essay, Sort of" (PDF). Sunstone. 17 (1): 10–13.

== Sources ==
- Mormon Historic Sites foundation interview with Kimball
- "Deseret News article on Kimball's death". Deseret News. May 18, 2003.
