= Emery County Cabin =

Frontier post office building in Utah, United States

Coordinates: 40°45′16″N 111°49′04″W

Emery County Cabin is one of the last few historic frontier post offices still known to exist in the United States. The cabin was constructed in 1879, and became the official post office of Muddy Creek (now Emery), Emery County, Utah in the 1880s. The cabin is currently located in the Utah State Park system at This Is The Place Heritage Park.

== History ==
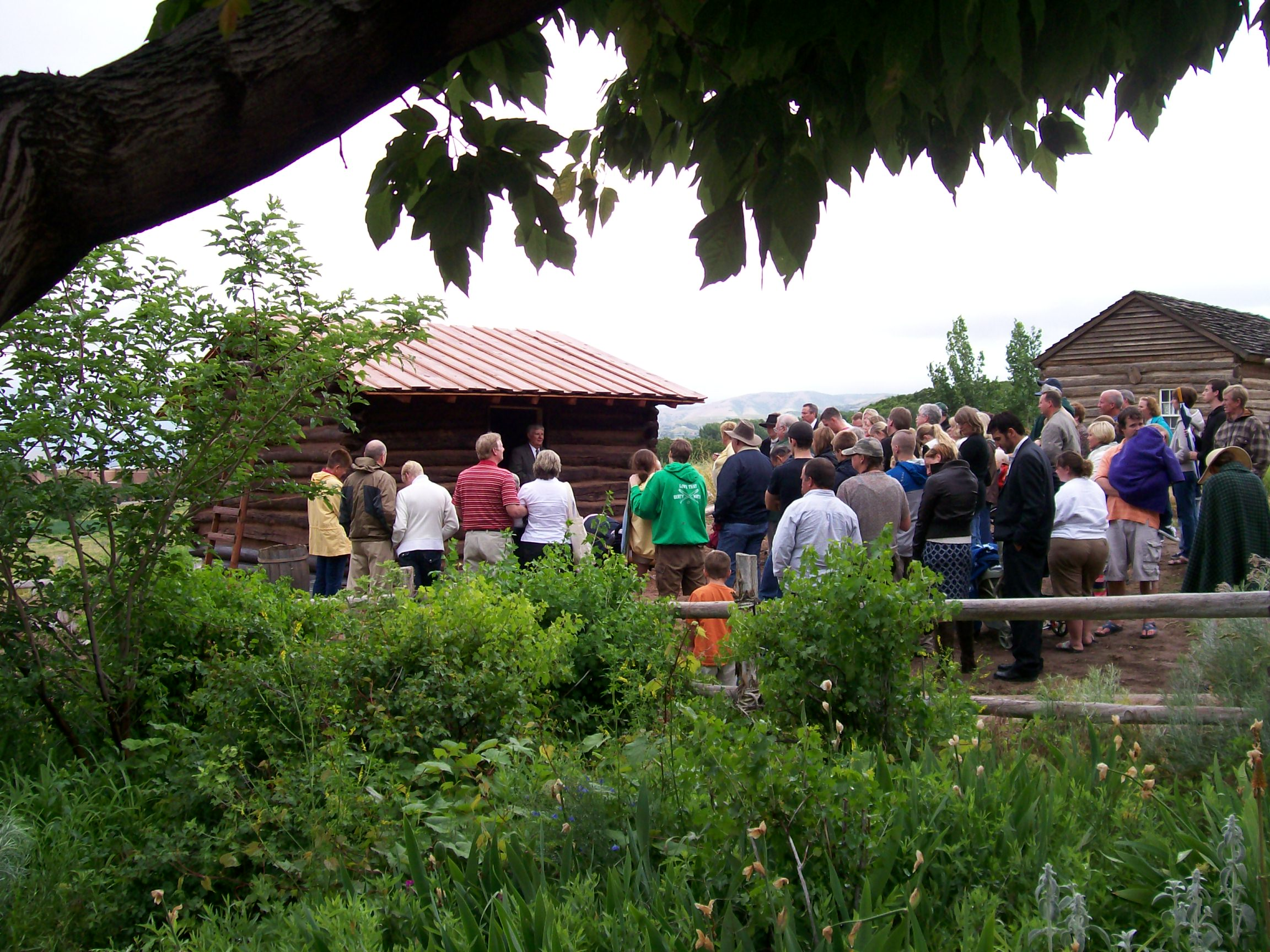
The dedication ceremony of the relocated and restored Emery County Cabin, June 20, 2009

The cabin was one of two built by settlers Charles Johnson and Joseph Lund on Muddy Creek homesteads. While earlier arrivals had lived in "dugouts" the Lund cabin was the first log home to be built in the area. When Lund moved back to Spring City, rancher Casper Christensen moved his family into the abandoned cabin. Christensen was named postmaster of the area in 1882, and his log home became the official post office of both Muddy Creek and Quitchupah. The logs were cut and hauled from nearby Miller’s canyon. The logs were smoothed on one-side with grooves chopped in each end. They were then placed on top of each other with the smooth side facing inward. Chinks between the logs were filled with mud or clay. Willows were used for lath, nailed to the logs, and plastered with mud. The mud was then rubbed smooth and painted with a whitewash of lime. The roof was made with cedar shingles.

== Post Office ==
In 1879, people had settled in Muddy Creek Canyon, establishing a town that was known as "Muddy" for short. No one seems to know exactly why the town of Muddy received the name of Emery instead of keeping the name Muddy as it was originally called by the Postmaster General when Casper Christensen was first officially appointed postmaster of Muddy on December 1, 1883. His daughter Hannah was appointed as his assistant. Perhaps it was in honor of Governor George W. Emery who became the territory’s Chief Executive in 1875 and for whom the state officials christened Emery County in 1880.

The first settlers were able to get mail once a month, in the summer, and not at all in the winter. It was brought by horseback from San Pete County, through Salina Canyon by anyone who might be going through. In 1882, mail service to Muddy Creek was improved to once a week, making a 60-mile trek from Price, Utah. Casper played a prominent role in Emery affairs during the settlement era. Prior to his appointment of postmaster, Casper was appointed Presiding Elder of the Muddy Branch of the LDS Church. In addition to a post office, the building also served the town as a doctor’s office, with Wiley Payne Allred, a former bodyguard of Joseph Smith’s, using his in-laws post office as a place to set broken limbs, extract teeth and apply herbal remedies.

== Demise and restoration ==
After a few years of stock raising and farming the settlers could see there was not enough farmland along the creek. Larger tracts of land lay several miles south of Muddy Creek suitable for dry farming. A canal was constructed in 1886 that diverted water from the Muddy to new available farm land. The present town site of Emery was surveyed in 1887. Almost immediately the settlers from Muddy and Quitchupah began filing on land and preparing to build homes. The town on Muddy Creek became a ghost town, leaving several structures still on its banks including the old post office as a new building was established in Emery. In the 1920s, Clyde Mortensen, being newly married and in need of home, went with a team of horses and relocated the old post office to Emery to function as temporary home, while he constructed a more modern home. The post office was utilized as a storage facility, and the cabin avoided being scrapped, similar to other pioneer cabins constructed in that era. In the early 2000s, Shaun Delliskave, a grandson of Clyde Mortensen, donated the cabin to This Is The Place Heritage Park in Salt Lake City. The cabin is of historic importance as it is one of the few surviving frontier post offices to still exist. Some controversy ensued when it was found that the cabin was not being carefully preserved until renovation. The park fully renovated the cabin in 2009, titling it the "Emery County Cabin".

The Utah Home Builder's Association (HBA) adopted the building through This is The Place Foundation's "Adopt-a-Home" program. HBA helped reconstruct and provide assistance to the renovation of the frontier post office. Due to its historical multipurpose, it will serve as home to the park's interpretive potter. This entry will be the park's first entry from Emery County.

The cabin at This Is The Place Heritage Park was dedicated on June 20, 2009. In conjunction with the dedication, the park held Emery County Day, where Emery County residents were granted free admission for the festivities. Ellis V. Allred, a great-grandson of Casper Christensen, dedicated the cabin.
