= Emery LDS Church =

Historic church in Utah, United States

- U.S. National Register of Historic Places
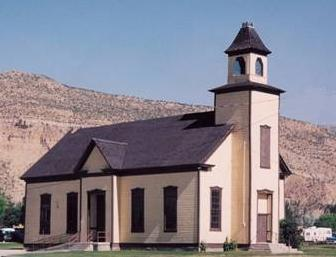

- Location within Utah Location within the United States
- Location: 100 E 100 N, Emery, Utah
- Coordinates: 38°55′27″N 111°14′48″W
- Area: less than one acre
- Built: 1898
- Architectural style: New England Clapboard Style
- NRHP reference No.: 80003903
- Added to NRHP: February 22, 1980

The Emery LDS Church is significant as the oldest remaining religious building in Emery County and as the last remaining “New England” clapboard style meetinghouse of the Church of Jesus Christ of Latter-day Saints (LDS Church) in Utah. Structurally, the meetinghouse is significant because of its wood-frame construction sheathed in clapboard and lined with non-load bearing wall of adobe. This construction technique was very unusual for a Mormon meetinghouse built at the turn of the 20th century.

The first settlers built a post office and at the time a log one-room school house (16’ x 18’) was constructed. The structure, with its dirt floor and backless plank benches, also served as a meetinghouse and amusement hall.

In 1898, work began on the construct of the Emery meetinghouse. The frame meetinghouse was built of local lumber with the dimensions being 36.5’ and 84’6". The meetinghouse was reported to have a capacity of 500 people.

The frame construction was typical of many of the buildings in Emery County. However, it was seldom used in LDS meetinghouses. Ironically, a more expensive brick meetinghouse constructed in 1896 at nearby Huntington, Utah was torn down in the 1960s. Some people argued that the alkali soil of Emery County could not support the heavier brick structure and, therefore, the lighter frame meetinghouse in Emery did not suffer from a weakened foundation as did the Huntington meetinghouse.

The meetinghouse in Emery, Utah was constructed under the direction of Bishop Alonzo Brinkerhoff. The construction was completed in 1900. Upon completion in 1900, services were however held in the chapel. However, because an apparent problem in paying the $7,000 construction cost, the meetinghouse was not dedicated until July 27, 1902. At the dedication services, Bishop Brinkerhoff reported that “it had cost $7,000 to build the house, and that it was paid for.” Elder Rudger Clawson, an Apostle in the LDS Church, offered the dedicatory prayer and later in the meeting went on to praise all those, “…who had assisted in building such a splendid meeting house, and the blessing of God would rest upon the people and crown their labors.”

The handsome frame church served the members of Emery well until the post World War II years, when the LDS Church shifted to exclusively build and use multipurpose meetinghouses. Accordingly, a new, modern meetinghouse was dedicated June 25, 1956. The old building was purchased by the city in 1967 for use as a town meeting and recreation hall.
