= Clay Christiansen (organist) =

American organist

Dr. Clay Christiansen
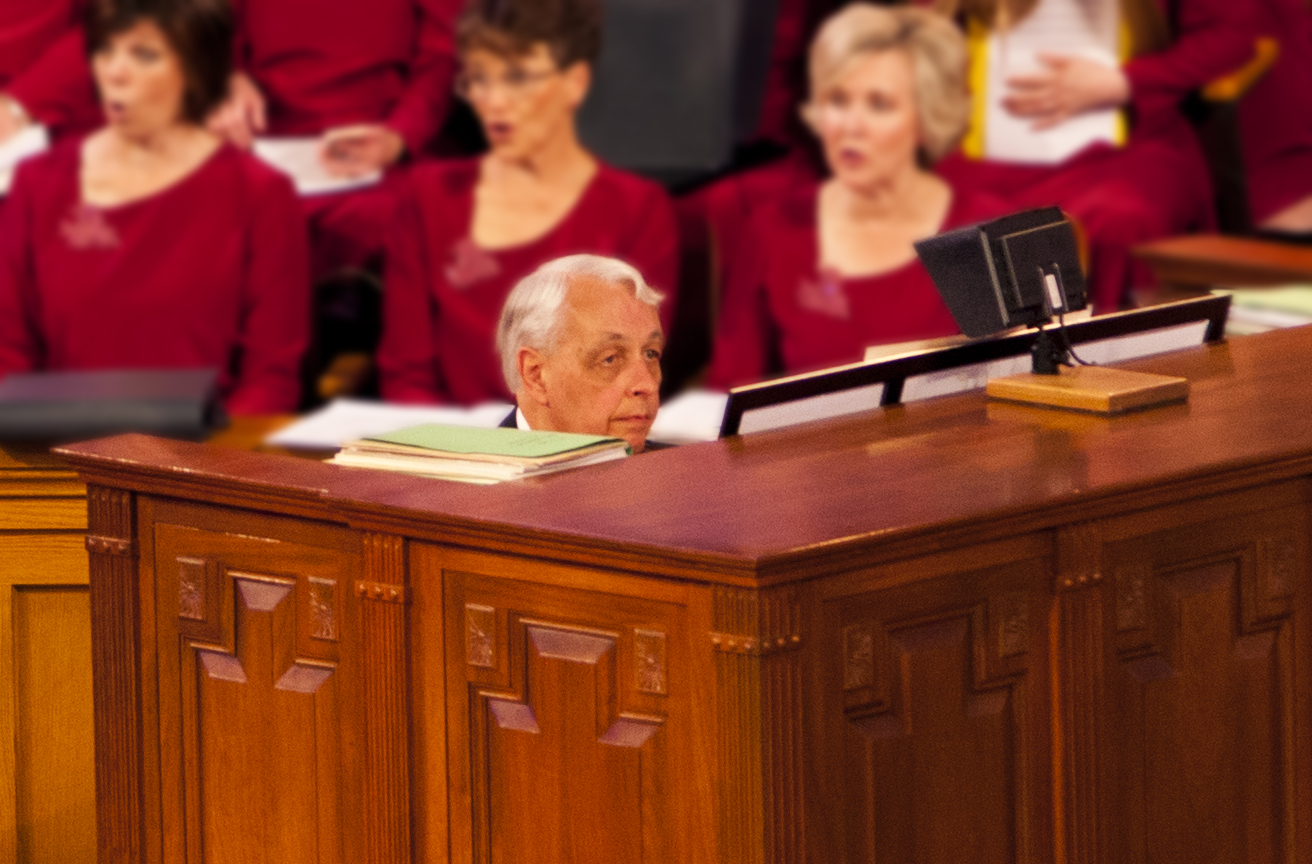
- Clay Christiansen at the organ in the Salt Lake Tabernacle in Salt Lake City, Utah.

Background information
- Born: 1949; Emery, Utah
- Origin: Salt Lake City, Utah
- Genres: Classical, Choral
- Occupation(s): Organist at the Salt Lake Tabernacle, LDS Conference Center, St. Mark's Episcopal Cathedral, Congregation Kol Ami
- Years active: 1982–2018
- Formerly of: Mormon Tabernacle Choir, Orchestra at Temple Square, Canadian Brass, United States Air Force Band, Danish Radio Choir

Clay Christiansen (/krɪsˈtiːænsɛn/ krist-EE-an-sen) is an American organist who previously played for the Mormon Tabernacle Choir (Choir), often on the Salt Lake Tabernacle organ. He accompanied the Choir in Salt Lake City and when it was on tour. Christiansen also provided organ recitals in the Salt Lake Tabernacle and the Conference Center.

== Early life ==
Christiansen had a fascination with music from an early age. He was born in 1949 in the small city of Emery, Utah. He would play the piano for hours on end. When neighbor children would come to play, he would rather stay in and practice the piano. As a member of the Church of Jesus Christ of Latter-day Saints (LDS Church), he played his first piano solo, "We Thank Thee, O God, for a Prophet", in church at the age of six. He played by ear until the age of eight when he took his first piano lessons. He was the accompanist for his church Sunday School and priesthood services, and a substitute ward organist at the age of eleven.

Christiansen received a bachelor's degree in organ performance from Brigham Young University, and master's and Ph.D. degrees in music composition from the University of Utah.

== Career ==
From 1972 to 1982, Christiansen was the organist for St. Mark's Episcopal Cathedral in Salt Lake City. Christiansen was also organist at Congregation Kol Ami, a Jewish synagogue in Salt Lake City. From 1982 to 2018 he was one of the Tabernacle Organists.

== Personal life ==
Christiansen and his wife, Diane, have 13 children and over 50 grandchildren.

Christiansen is also a composer. He wrote the music to the LDS Church hymn "In Fasting We Approach Thee". He has written a broad variety of choral, piano and organ compositions and transcriptions. His works appear in the catalogs of MorningStar Music Publishers, Shawnee Press, Jackman Music Press and SDG Press.
