= Greased paper window =

Window made of paper coated with grease

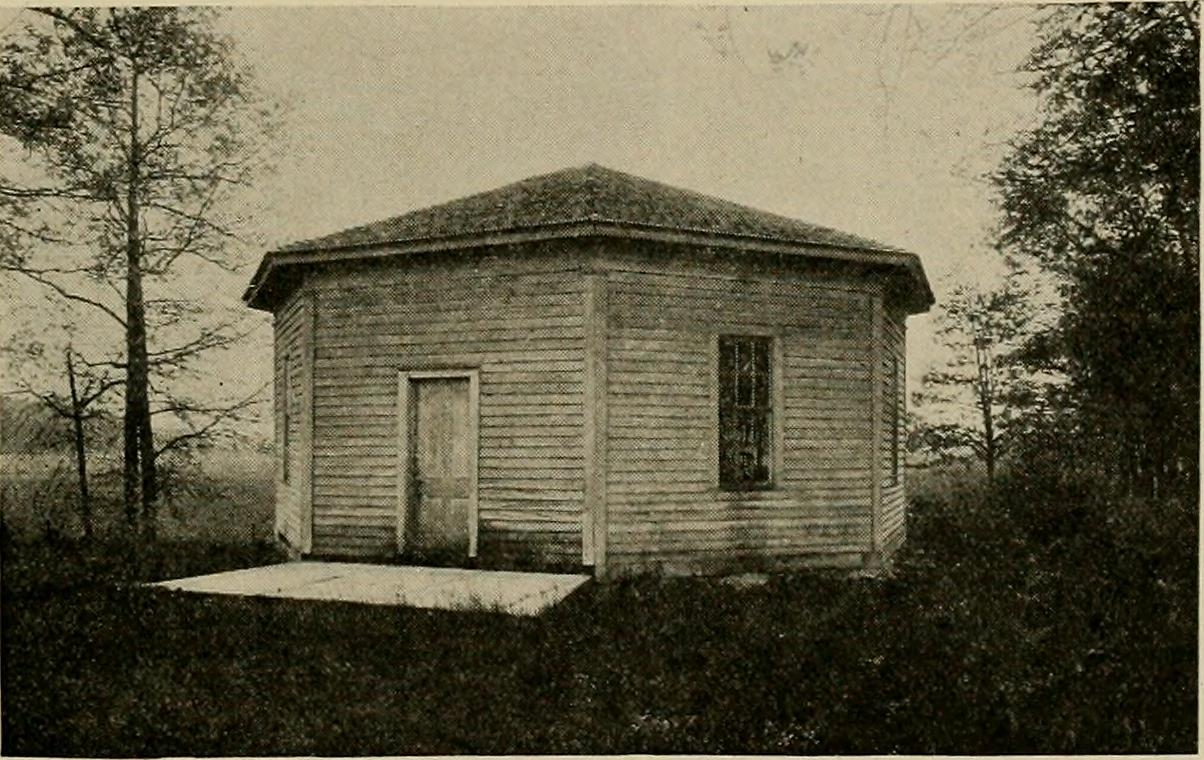
1919 photograph of an early-to-mid 19th century schoolhouse in Plain Township, Kosciusko County, Indiana, with a greased-paper window

A greased paper window is a very inexpensive window made of paper coated in grease. The grease fills gaps between the paper fibers, reducing the amount of light lost to scattering. Greased paper windows provide a diffuse light source, while blocking wind and preventing insects and other small animals from entering a structure.

Greased paper windows were often used by American pioneers of the early 1800s and other itinerant peoples, in lieu of relatively expensive traditional glass windows. Laura Ingalls Wilder recalled living in a home with a greased paper window in her 1937 children's novel, On the Banks of Plum Creek.

== See also ==
- Log cabin
- Dugout (shelter)
- Sod house
- Frosted glass
