= This Is the Place Heritage Park =

State park in Salt Lake City, Utah, U.S.

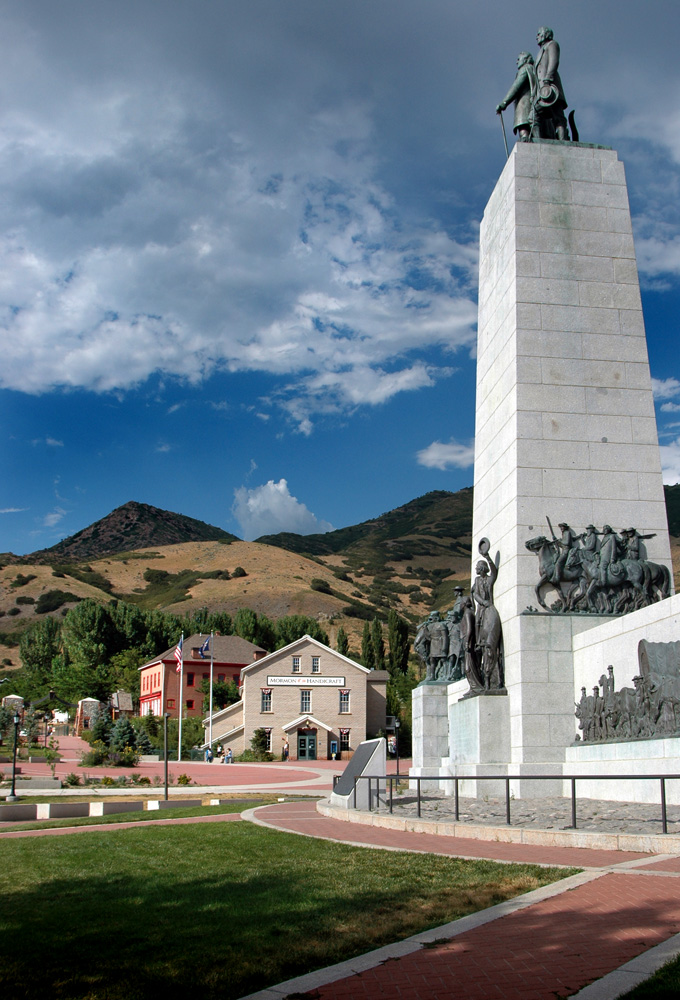
- This Is The Place Monument and Deseret Village
- Interactive map of This Is the Place Heritage Park
- Type: State park
- Location: Salt Lake City, Utah, U.S.
- Coordinates: 40.753320°N 111.816594°W
- Area: 450 acres (1.8 km^{2})
- Established: 1957
- Owner: Government of Utah
- Status: Active
- Website: www.thisistheplace.org

This Is the Place Heritage Park is a Utah State Park that is located on the east side of Salt Lake City, Utah, United States, at the foot of the Wasatch Range and near the mouth of Emigration Canyon. A non-profit foundation manages the park.

== History ==
The location of the park is where, on July 24, 1847, Brigham Young first saw the Salt Lake Valley, which would soon become the new home for the Mormon pioneers. Members of the Church of Jesus Christ of Latter-day Saints believe Young had a vision shortly after they were exiled from Nauvoo, Illinois. In the vision, he saw the place where the Latter-day Saints would settle and "make the desert blossom like a rose" and where they would build their State of Deseret. As the account goes, Young was very sick with Rocky Mountain spotted fever and was riding in the back of a wagon. After exiting Emigration Canyon and cresting a small hill, he asked to look out of the wagon. Those with him opened the canvas cover and propped him up so he could see the empty desert valley below. He then proclaimed, "It is enough. This is the right place. Drive on." The words, "this is the place," were soon heard throughout the wagon train as the Mormon pioneers descended into the valley, their long journey having come to an end. The statement was first attributed to Young by Wilford Woodruff more than thirty years after the pioneer advent.

Over the next several years, tens of thousands of Mormon pioneers emerged from Emigration Canyon and first saw their new home from this same location. A Utah state holiday, Pioneer Day, occurs each year on July 24 to commemorate the entry of the Mormon pioneers into the valley.

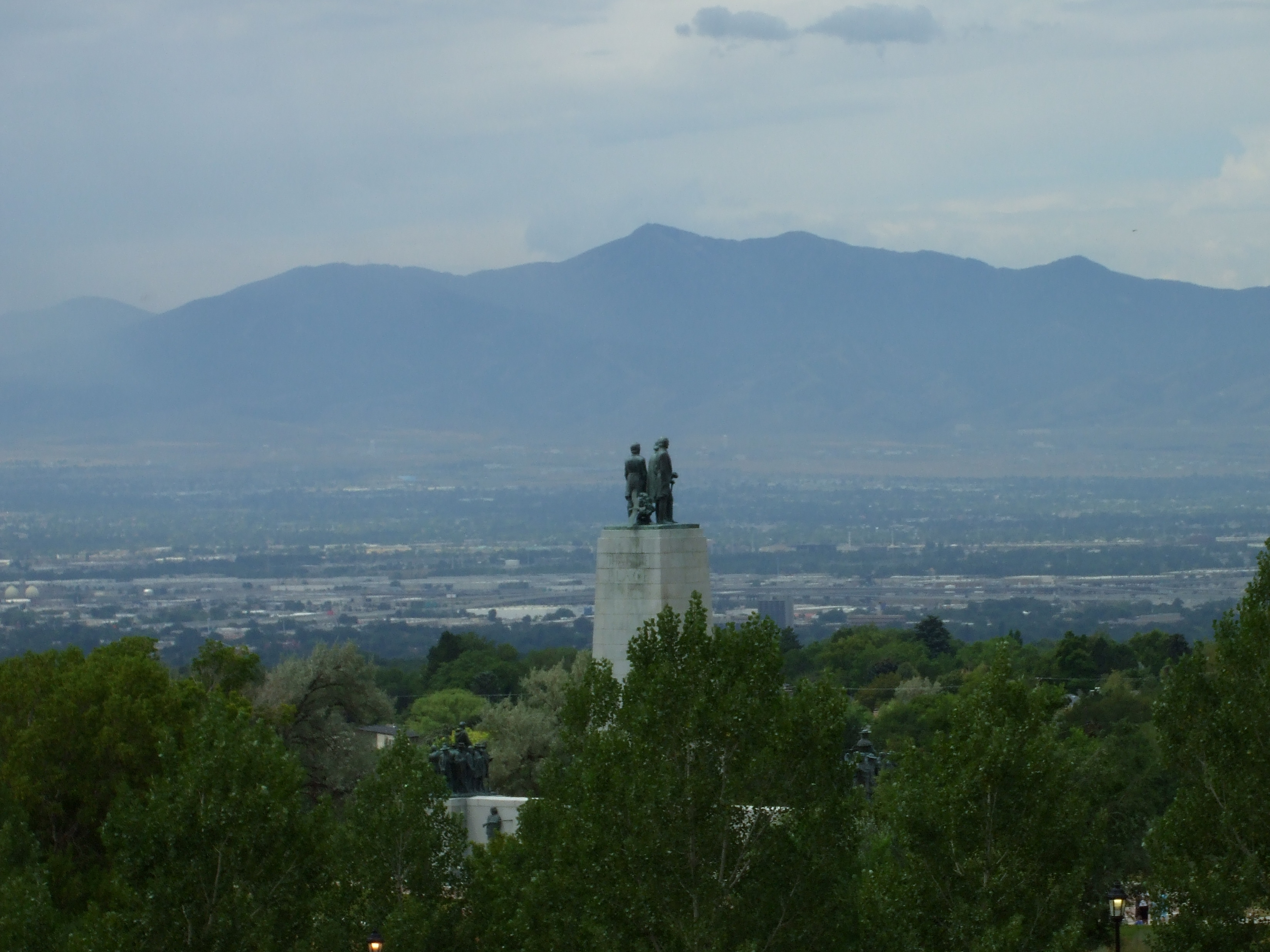
View of the Salt Lake Valley from the original 1921 monument

== Monument ==
In 1917, B. H. Roberts and a Boy Scout troop built a wooden marker identifying the spot where Young's party had first entered the valley. In 1921 this was replaced by a white stone obelisk that still stands east of the 1917 monument. Development of the monument began in 1937 when sculptor Mahonri M. Young, a grandson of Young, was commissioned by the State of Utah to design and create a new, larger monument. In 1947, on the 100th anniversary of the entry of the pioneers into the valley, This Is The Place Monument was dedicated at a ceremony attended by nearly 50,000 people. In 1957, a group of private citizens bought much of the land now contained in the Park and gave it to the State of Utah to preserve it from commercial development. One of the previous uses for the land was an artillery firing range for nearby Fort Douglas. The state Parks and Recreation Division was charged with the responsibility for maintenance and improvement of the property.

== Heritage Village ==
The village began around 1959, when a small visitors' center was constructed near the Monument; it featured a large mural by local artist Lynn Fausett. Well-attended, the monument convinced the legislature in 1971 to appropriate $100,000 to prepare a master plan for the creation of a living history museum. Following the appropriation of $1M for land acquisition and development, the Park was expanded to include 450 acres (1.8 km^{2}). In 1974, an additional $1.7M was appropriated for the construction of underground utilities.

In 1975, restoration or replication of historical buildings from Utah's history to was begun to make a living history museum. Young's Forest Farmhouse was moved in 1975 from the Forest Dale area in the central valley to the Park for restoration. In 1979, five original pioneer homes were donated to the Park and restored; a small bowery was constructed. The 1980s included a replica of the original Social Hall, located in downtown Salt Lake City, two adobe homes, two frame homes and one log cabin were relocated to the Park. The blacksmith shop also was completed.

1992 through 1995 was a period of major expansion in which the Manti Z.C.M.I store was dismantled and reconstructed in the Park, a pioneer dugout home was constructed, 15 replica structures were built and the Hickman Cabin was relocated from Fairfield to the Park. The Utah Statehood Centennial Commission adopted the Park as its living legacy project. The legislature appropriated $2.4M for a new visitors' center. In 1996, the park was designated This Is The Place State Park by the State Centennial Commission. In 1998, the state legislature approved the creation of the private, non-profit This Is The Place Foundation that would manage the Park.

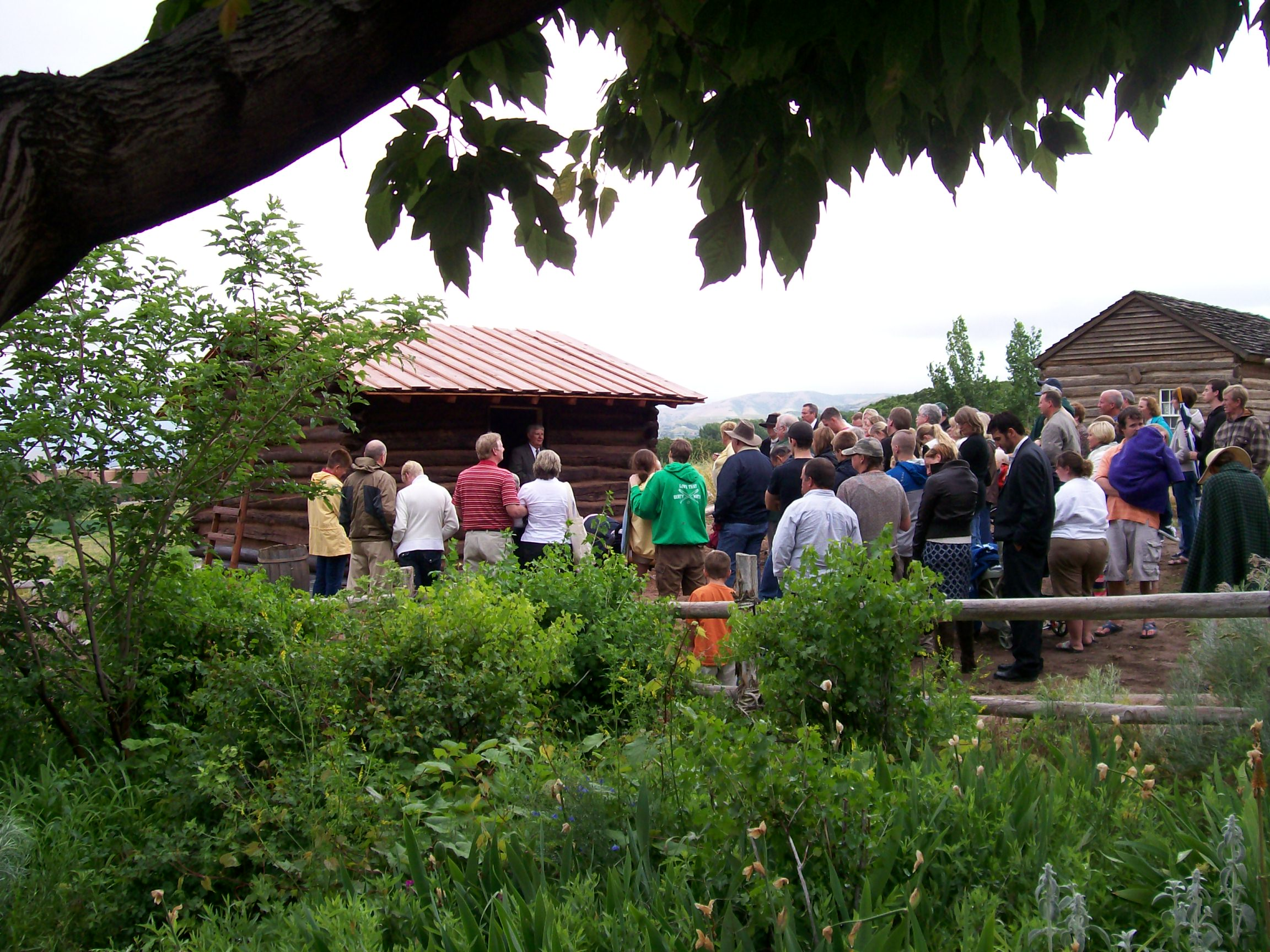
Dedication ceremonies of the Emery County Cabin in June 2009

From 2000 to 2004, another Park expansion included construction of a large parking area east of the Monument and a plaza between it and the new visitors' center. Other construction completed during this period involved the Cedar City Tithing Office, Snelgrove Boot Shop, John Pack home, William Atkin home, Brigham Young Academy (BYA), Heber C. Kimball home, P.W. Madsen Furniture Company, and the Deseret Hospital. With this significant construction boom, the Park's finances were challenged, and the state legislature made an emergency appropriation to keep the park afloat. The construction of a replica of the original BYA, the school that became Brigham Young University, was funded by gifts from donors including Stanley and Mary Ellen Smoot. In 2006, management of This Is The Place Foundation was changed, and with it the direction of the Park. Emphasis was placed on expanding the programming and access to the Park.

With this emphasis on programming, two replica trains were acquired to aid in accessibility and entertainment. A new logo was adopted and all printed materials were upgraded. In 1996, the Staker Cabin tinsmith shop was added creating a new historic trade in the park. The Emery County Cabin was added as well as Native American displays were made. The Monument Café was opened, as were a new Pioneer Playground and Petting Corral.

In 2011, the Park had a setback when the executive director, Matthew Dahl, embezzled over $300,000 from the park. He pled guilty and paid back the stolen funds.

A splash pad called Irrigation Station was added to teach about water use in Utah.

== Management ==
In early 2026, Missy W. Larsen became the Executive Director and Chief Executive Officer of the park. Larsen succeeded Case Lawrence. Ellis Ivory, who preceded Lawrence, held the position for 19 years.

== See also ==
- Mormon Battalion
- Mormon handcart pioneers
- Mormon Trail
- Pioneer Village (Utah)
- Utah...This Is The Place
