= Willie and Martin handcart companies =

19th-century U.S. religious migrants

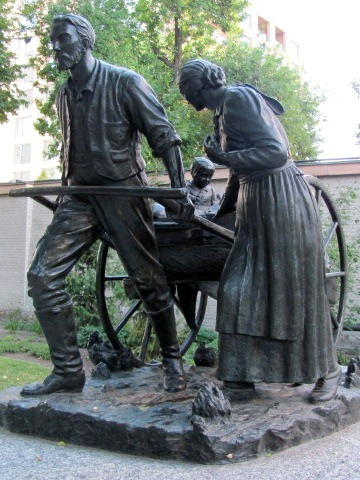
The Handcart Pioneer Monument, by Torleif S. Knaphus, located on Temple Square in Salt Lake City, Utah

The Willie and Martin handcart companies were two companies of LDS handcart pioneers that were participating in the migration of members of the Church of Jesus Christ of Latter-day Saints (LDS Church) to Salt Lake City, Utah and used handcarts to transport their belongings. The LDS handcart movement began in 1856 and continued until 1860. The trek was disastrous for these two companies, which started their journey dangerously late in 1856 and were caught by heavy snow and severe temperatures in central Wyoming. Despite a dramatic rescue effort, more than 210 of the 980 pioneers in these two companies died along the way. John Chislett, a survivor, wrote, "Many a father pulled his cart, with his little children on it, until the day preceding his death."

The handcart pioneers, and especially the members of the Willie and Martin companies, have become an important symbol in LDS culture, representing the faithfulness and sacrifice of the pioneer generation. They continue to be recognized and honored in events such as Pioneer Day, church pageants, and similar commemorations.

== Background to the migration ==
The Church of Jesus Christ of Latter-day Saints was first organized in 1830. After the members of the church experienced conflict and violence in Ohio, Missouri, and Illinois, in 1846 their leader, Brigham Young, led them to resettle in the Great Basin. When the first Mormon pioneers reached Utah in 1847, the church encouraged its converts in Europe to emigrate to Utah. From 1849 to 1855, about 16,000 European Latter-day Saints traveled to the United States by ship, through the eastern states by rail, and to Utah by ox and wagon.

To cut costs for the church members who remained in Europe, who were mostly poor, Young proposed a plan of switching to handcarts in a letter to Franklin D. Richards, president of the European Mission, in September 1855. Young's letter and an editorial endorsing Young's plan by Richards was published in the Millennial Star the church's England-based periodical, on December 22, 1855. The cost of the migration was expected to be reduced by one-third. Poor church members who wanted to emigrate responded enthusiastically to the new plan– in 1856 the Perpetual Emigration Fund supported the travel of 2,012 European emigrants, compared with 1,161 the year before.

The first two ships carrying about 815 emigrants departed England in late March and mid-April. When they arrived in Iowa City, Iowa, they were organized into the first three handcart companies, which all safely arrived in Salt Lake City in late September or early October.

== Journey begins ==
The last two handcart companies of 1856 departed late from England. The ship Thornton, carrying the emigrants who became the Willie Company, left England on May 4. The leader of the Latter-day Saints on the ship was James G. Willie. Horizon departed eleven days later, carrying the emigrants who later formed the Martin Company. The late departures may have been the result of difficulties in procuring ships in response to the unexpected demand.

With slow communications in the era before the transatlantic telegraph, the church's agents in Iowa City were not expecting the additional emigrants and made frantic preparations for their arrival. Weeks were spent hastily assembling the carts and outfitting the companies. When the companies reached Omaha, Nebraska (previously Florence before Florence was absorbed into Omaha), additional time was lost making repairs to the poorly built carts. Emigrant John Chislett describes the problems with the carts:

The axles and boxes being of wood, and being ground out by the dust that found its way there in spite of our efforts to keep it out, together with the extra weight put on the carts, had the effect of breaking the axles at the shoulder. All kinds of expedients were resorted to as remedies for the growing evil, but with variable success. Some wrapped their axles with leather obtained from bootlegs; others with tin, obtained by sacrificing tin-plates, kettles, or buckets from their mess outfit. Besides these inconveniences, there was felt a great lack of a proper lubricator. Of anything suitable for this purpose we had none at all.

Prior to the Willie Company departing Omaha, the company met to debate if they should continue the journey immediately or wait for the spring. Because the emigrants were unfamiliar with the trail and the climate, they deferred to the returning missionaries and church agents. One of the returning missionaries, Levi Savage, urged them to spend the winter in Nebraska. He argued that such a late departure with a company consisting of the elderly, women, and young children would lead to suffering, sickness, and death. Some members of the company, perhaps as many as 100, decided to spend the winter in Omaha or in Council Bluffs, Iowa, but the majority, about 404 in number (including Savage) continued the journey west. The Willie Company left Omaha on August 17 and the Martin Company on August 27. Two ox-wagon trains, led by captains W.B. Hodgett and John A. Hunt, followed the Martin Company.

Near Wood River, Nebraska, a herd of bison caused the Willie Company's cattle to stampede, and nearly 30 cattle were lost. Left without enough cattle to pull all of the wagons, each handcart was required to take on an additional 100 pounds (45 kg) of flour. In early September, Richards, returning from Europe where he had served as the church's mission president, passed the emigrant companies. Richards and the 12 returning missionaries who accompanied him, traveling in carriages and light wagons pulled by horses and mules, pressed on to Utah to obtain assistance for the emigrants.

== Disaster and rescue ==
In early October the two companies reached Fort Laramie, Wyoming. They expected to be restocked with provisions, but they were unavailable. The companies cut back food rations down to 12 oz (340 g) per person, hoping that their supplies would last until help arrived from Utah. To lighten their loads, the Martin Company cut the luggage allowance to 10 pounds (4.5 kg) per person, discarding clothing and blankets.

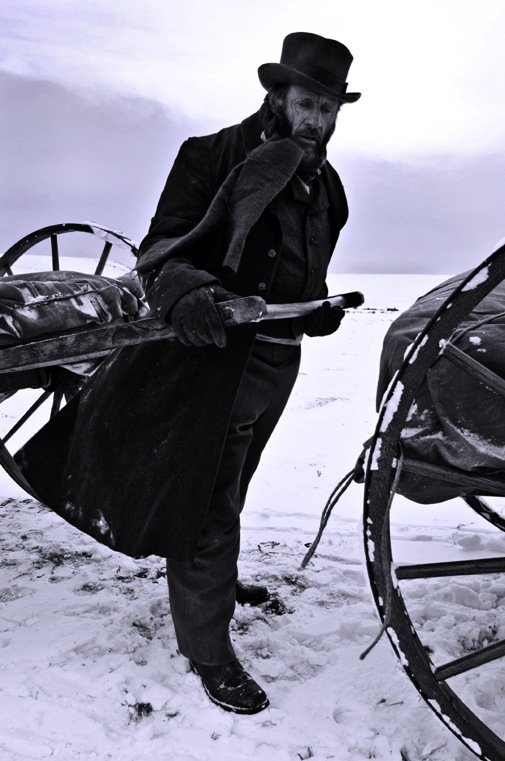
Dramatization of man pulling handcart through snow

On October 4, the Richards party reached Salt Lake City and conferred with Brigham Young and other church leaders. The next morning the church held a general conference, where Young and the other speakers called on church members to provide wagons, mules, supplies, and teamsters for a rescue mission. On the morning of October 7, the first rescue party left Salt Lake City with 16 wagon-loads of food and supplies, pulled by four-mule teams with 27 young men serving as teamsters and rescuers. Throughout October more wagon trains were assembled, and by the end of the month 250 relief wagons were sent.

The Willie and Martin companies were running out of food and encountering extremely cold temperatures. On October 19, a blizzard struck the region, halting the two companies and the relief party. The Willie Company was along the Sweetwater River approaching the Continental Divide. A scouting party sent ahead by the main rescue party found and greeted the emigrants, gave them a small amount of flour, encouraged them that rescue was near, and then rushed onward to try to locate the Martin Company. The members of the Willie Company had reached the end of their flour supplies and slaughtered the handful of broken-down cattle that still remained. On October 20, Captain Willie and Joseph Elder went ahead by mule through the snow to locate the supply train and inform them of the company's desperate situation. They arrived at the rescue party's campsite near South Pass that evening, and by the next evening, the rescue party reached the Willie Company and provided them with food and assistance. Half of the rescue party remained to assist the Willie Company while the other half pressed forward to assist the Martin Company. On October 23, the second day after the main rescue party had arrived, the Willie Company faced the most difficult section of the trail—the ascent up Rocky Ridge. The climb took place during a howling snowstorm through knee-deep snow. That night 13 emigrants died.

On October 19, the Martin Company was about 110 miles (180 km) further east, making its last crossing of the North Platte River near present-day Casper, Wyoming. Shortly after completing the crossing, the blizzard struck. Many members of the company suffered from hypothermia or frostbite after wading through the frigid river. They set up camp at Red Bluffs, unable to continue forward through the snow. Meanwhile, the original scouting party continued eastward until it reached a small vacant fort at Devil's Gate, where they had been instructed to wait for the rest of the rescue party if they had not found the Martin Company. When the main rescue party rejoined them, another scouting party consisting of Joseph Young, Abel Garr, and Daniel Webster Jones was sent forward. The Martin company remained in their camp at Red Bluffs for nine days until the three scouts arrived on October 28; 56 members of the company had died while they waited. The scouts urged the emigrants to begin moving again. During this interval, the party was met by Ephraim Hanks, bringing meat from a recently slaughtered buffalo. The meat likely saved many lives as the nutritive value was much higher than that of the other supplies. Finding many of the emigrants with frozen hands and feet, Hanks later wrote: "Many such I washed with water and castile soap, until the frozen parts would fall off." He also performed many blessings and helped in some amputations to stop the progression of the frostbite and gangrene that would have otherwise killed more members of the company. Three days later the main rescue party met the Martin Company and the Hodgett and Hunt wagon companies, and they helped them on to Devil's Gate.

George D. Grant, who headed the rescue party, reported to Young:

It is not of much use for me to attempt to give a description of the situation of these people, for this you will learn from [others]; but you can imagine between five and six hundred men, women and children, worn down by drawing hand carts through snow and mud; fainting by the wayside; falling, chilled by the cold; children crying, their limbs stiffened by cold, their feet bleeding and some of them bare to snow and frost. The sight is almost too much for the stoutest of us; but we go on doing all we can, not doubting nor despairing.

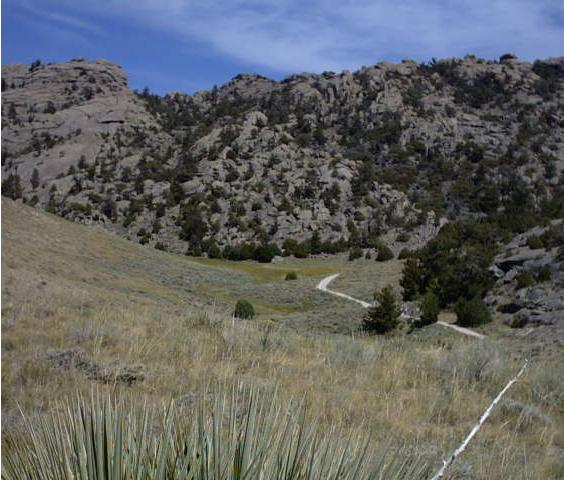
Martin's Cove, Wyoming

At Devil's Gate, the rescue party unloaded the baggage carried in the wagons of the Hodgett and Hunt wagon companies that had been following the Martin Company so the wagons could be used to transport the weakest emigrants. A small group, led by Jones, remained at Devil's Gate over the winter to protect the property. The severe weather forced the Martin Company to halt for five days; the company moved into Martin's Cove, a few miles west of Devil's Gate, as it was much more protected than the open plains to the east. During this season, the river, though shallow at about 2 feet (0.61 metres), was also 90 to 120 feet (27 to 37 metres) wide. The stream temperature was frigid and clogged with floating ice. Some of the men of the rescue party spent hours pulling the carts and carrying many of the emigrants across the river, while many members of the company crossed the river themselves, with some pulling their own handcarts. The rescue parties escorted the emigrants from both companies to Utah through snow and severe weather. When the Willie Company arrived in Salt Lake City on November 9, 68 members of the company had died from disease and exposure.

Meanwhile, a backup relief party of 77 teams and wagons was making its way east to provide additional assistance to the Martin Company. After passing Fort Bridger, the leaders of the backup party concluded that the Martin Company must have wintered east of the Rockies, so they turned back. When word of the returning backup relief party was communicated to Young, he ordered the courier to return and tell them to turn back east and continue until they found the handcart company. On November 18, the backup party met the Martin Company with the supplies so they could continue the journey. The 104 wagons carrying the Martin Company arrived in Salt Lake City on November 30; at least 145 members of the company had died during the journey. Many of the survivors had to have fingers, toes, or limbs amputated due to severe frostbite. Residents of Utah allowed the companies to stay in their homes during the winter. The emigrants would eventually go to Latter-day Saint settlements throughout Utah and the West.

== Responsibility for the tragedy ==
As early as November 2, 1856, while the Willie and Martin companies were still making their way to safety, Young responded to criticism of his own leadership by rebuking Franklin Richards and Daniel Spencer for allowing the companies to leave so late. Many authors argued that Young, as author of the plan, was responsible. Ann Eliza Young, daughter of one of the men in charge of building the carts and a former plural wife of Brigham Young, described her ex-husband's plan as a "cold-blooded, scheming, blasphemous policy". Most survivors refused to blame anyone. One traveler, Francis Webster, said it was a privilege to be part of the Martin company. One survivor, John Chislett, wrote bitterly of Richards's promise that "we should get to Zion in safety."

American West historian, Wallace Stegner, described the inadequate planning and improvident decisions of leadership caused the struggles of the companies. He described Richards as a scapegoat for Young's fundamental errors in planning, though Howard Christy, professor emeritus at Brigham Young University, noted that Richards had the authority to halt the companies' late departure because he was the highest-ranking official in the Omaha, Nebraska area. Christy also pointed out that Young and the other members of the church's First Presidency had consistently pointed out that departure from what is now Omaha, Nebraska, needed to happen by the end of May to safely make the journey.

Handcart company	Captain	Ship	Arrived Iowa City	Departed Iowa City	Departed Omaha	Arrived Salt Lake City	Number of people	Number died en route
Fourth or Willie Company	James G. Willie	Thornton, sailed May 4, 1856, to New York	June 26	July 15	August 17	November 9	~500 left Iowa City; 404 left Omaha	68
Fifth or Martin Company	Edward Martin	Horizon, sailed May 25, 1856, to Boston	July 8	July 28	August 27	November 30	576	>145

== See also ==
- History of The Church of Jesus Christ of Latter-day Saints
- History of the Latter Day Saint movement
- History of Utah

=== Notable members of the companies ===
==== Willie Company ====
- Jens Nielson, Danish entrepreneur that later settled several communities in the Cedar City Historic District
- Emily H. Woodmansee, one of the most influential Mormon poets in the 19th century

==== Martin Company ====
- John Jaques, missionary and editor of the Millennial Star, librarian and historian
- Samuel S. Jones, mayor of Provo, Utah
- Heber R. McBride, traveled in the company as a youth and recorded his experience in a journal
- Nellie Unthank, nine-year-old girl who suffered frostbite and had her lower legs amputated
- John Watkins, architect who settled in Midway, Utah

=== Notable members of the rescue parties ===
- Hosea Stout – Member of the second rescue party who carried messages to and from Salt Lake City
