= James Willie =

James Willie may refer to:

- James Willie (Texas politician) (1823–1863), Texas Attorney General
- James G. Willie (1815–1895), Latter-day Saint handcart pioneer
- James Willie (Malaysian politician), one of the Members of the Dewan Negara, 5th Malaysian Parliament
- James Willie, character in 17 Miracles
