= Ellsworth (surname) =

Ellsworth is a surname, originating in England prior to or around the 11th century A.D. in the Cambridgeshire area. The name comes from Elsworth, from the place-name (and family seat) which in turn was derived from the Old English name "Eli" and "worth", an Old English word for farm or homestead. The original spelling was Aylesworth. Many spelling variants are known to exist, including Ellesworth, Elsworth, Ellsworth, Elisworth, Ellisworth, Ellsworthy, Aylesworth, Aylsworth, etc. Ellsworth is by far the most common Americanized/"standard" spelling.

== Migration from Europe ==
Records show a number of emigrants to the new world in the 17th century such as:

- Josiah Ellsworth, settled in New England, possibly the same as is mentioned as purchasing land in Connecticut in 1645,
- Sir John Ellsworth, arrived in Boston, Massachusetts, in 1629
- Jeremiah Ellsworth, arrived in Rowley, Massachusetts, in 1650
- Theophilus Ellsworth, arrived in New Amsterdam in 1652.

Notable people with the surname include:

- Bobby Ellsworth (born 1959, Bobby "Blitz" Ellsworth), vocalist for the thrash metal band Overkill
- Brad Ellsworth (born 1958), U.S. Representative from Indiana
- Charles C. Ellsworth (1824–1899), U.S. Representative from Michigan
- Dick Ellsworth (1940–2022), Major League baseball pitcher
- Edmund Ellsworth, (1819–1893) LDS pioneer, Captain of the First Handcart Company
- Colonel Elmer E. Ellsworth, (1837–1861) friend of Abraham Lincoln often called the "first conspicuous casualty" of the American Civil War
- Harris Ellsworth (1899–1986), U.S. Representative from Oregon (1943–1957), chairman of U.S. Civil Service Commission (1957–1959), University of Oregon School of Journalism Hall of Achievement.
- James Ellsworth (1849–1925), Lincoln Ellsworth's father, noted banker who helped finance Roald Amundsen's polar 1925 North Pole expedition, coal mine owner, and benefactor of the city of Hudson, Ohio and the Western Reserve Academy
- James Ellsworth (wrestler) (born 1984), American wrestler
- Jason Ellsworth, American politician
- Jeri Ellsworth (born 1974), computer chip designer
- Lincoln Ellsworth (1880–1951), American polar explorer and benefactor of the American Museum of Natural History
- Oliver Ellsworth (1745–1807), 3rd Chief Justice of the U.S. Supreme Court, Founding Father of the United States
- Richard E. Ellsworth (c. 1911 – March 18, 1953), World War II pilot and USAF commander during the early part of the Cold War
- Robert Fred Ellsworth (1926–2011), U.S. Representative from Kansas and U.S. Ambassador to NATO
- Robert H. Ellsworth (1929–2014), American dealer of Asian art.
- Stukely Ellsworth (1769–1837), New York politician
- Warren Ellsworth (1950–1993), American operatic tenor
- William W. Ellsworth (1791–1868), American attorney and politician, governor of Connecticut

It has also become a first name (e.g. Ellsworth Kelly) and a place name in the United States such as Ellsworth Air Force Base, Ellsworth, South Dakota, Ellsworth, Maine, Ellsworth, Kansas, etc.
