= Martin's Cove =

- U.S. National Register of Historic Places
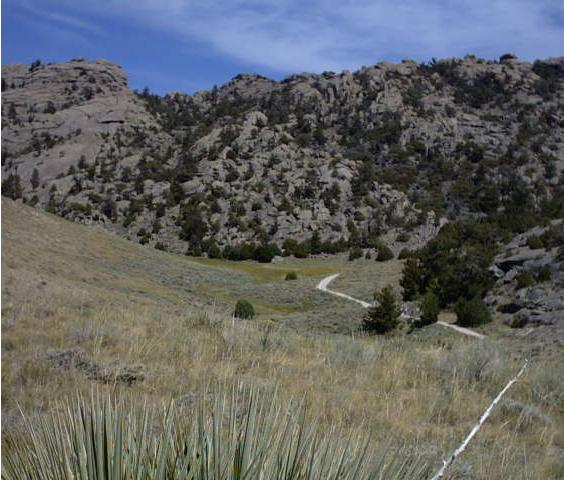
- Martin's Cove, Wyoming
- Interactive map of Martin's Cove
- Location: Southwest of Casper, Wyoming, US
- Nearest city: Alcova, Wyoming, US
- Coordinates: 42°27′15″N 107°14′18″W
- Visitation: 100,000+ (2005)
- NRHP reference No.: 77001383
- Added to NRHP: March 8, 1977

Martin's Cove is a historic site in Wyoming. The 933-acre (3.8 km^{2}) cove is 55 miles (89 km) southwest of Casper, Wyoming, in Natrona County, on the Mormon Trail. It is also part of the North Platte-Sweetwater segment of the Oregon Trail. The Cove was listed on the National Register of Historic Places on March 8, 1977.

== History ==
Before the cross-country railroad was operational, about 70,000 Mormons traveled the Mormon Trail with almost 6,000 dying along the way. In November 1856, about 600 members of the Church of Jesus Christ of Latter-day Saints (LDS Church) emigrating in the Martin Handcart Company were halted for five days in the Cove by snow and cold on their way to Salt Lake City. The Martin Handcart company had begun its journey on July 28, 1856, which was dangerously late in the season and led to the disaster. Although the number who died in the Cove is unknown, more than 145 members of the Martin Company died before reaching Salt Lake City. A few days before it reached Martin's Cove, the company was met by a small rescue party with food, supplies, and wagons that LDS Church president Brigham Young had sent from Salt Lake City. On November 4, the company and rescuers forded the Sweetwater River and sought shelter in the Cove. That evening a powerful north wind blew the tents to the ground. The tents were set up again, but a blizzard brought heavy snow. The company remained in the camp for five days, unable to proceed due to the snow and cold. A number of the company's cattle died there and were preserved in a frozen state. When the weather warmed on November 9, the company moved on toward Utah. With assistance from the original rescue party and additional rescue parties that met them along the way, the survivors reached Salt Lake City on November 30.

Later many other emigrants would pass the Cove on their way to Utah, California, and Oregon along with Pony Express Riders. During the 1870s, Tom Sun, a French-Canadian frontiersman, purchased the area around the Cove and established Tom Sun Ranch.

== Ownership ==
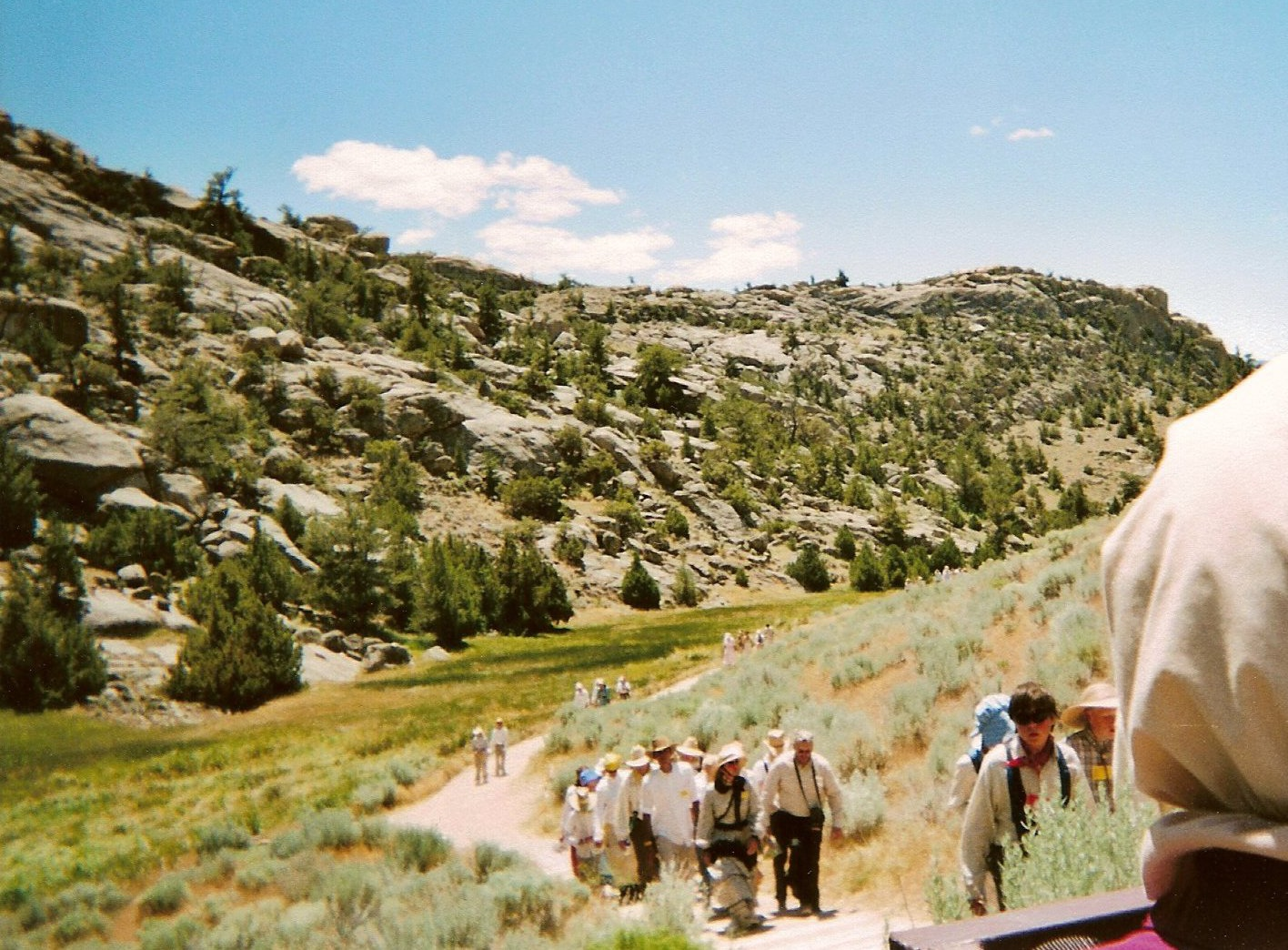
LDS youth and leaders visit Martin's Cove on one of the popular "Handcart Treks"

After the LDS Church purchased Sun Ranch in the 1990s it tried to purchase Martin's Cove to operate it as a historic site. In 2002, a congressional bill for the sale of the property passed the House but stalled in the Senate due to worries about the sale of public land to a religious group. The concerns arose mainly because the land includes areas commonly used as campgrounds by emigrant trains, the Pony Express, and other landmarks such as Devil's Gate. As a result, the Bureau of Land Management (BLM), part of the Interior Department, negotiated a long-term lease with the LDS Church. It was signed in 2004 and allowed the church to manage and maintain the property for 25 years.

In 2006, a settlement following a lawsuit by the American Civil Liberties Union modified the way the site is administered and required that the BLM remove religious references from the site and that the church provide a public entrance to the Cove through its property but independent of the visitors' center. The church's volunteers at the site are also required to simply answer questions rather than approach visitors with anything that could be interpreted as proselytizing.

It 2026, a group calling itself the "Wyoming Friends for Martin's Cove" began advocating for a land swap between the LDS Church and the BLM. The deal would turn over 933 BLM acres surrounding Martin’s Cove to the LDS Church. In exchange, the public would gain an equal number of LDS-owned acres split between two tracts: a 358-acre parcel along the Sweetwater River near Independence Rock and 575 acres between the mountainous Miller Springs and Savage Peak wilderness study areas.

== Visitors ==
About 100,000 people visit the site each year, most of them LDS Church members. Every year thousands of the church's youth participate in "Handcart Treks" through the area near Martin's Cove. These Treks typically involve dressing up in period clothing while spending several days pulling handcarts and camping along the Mormon Trail. The highlight of the Trek is visiting Martin's Cove and nearby Devil's Gate, along with the church's visitors' center.

== See also ==
- List of Registered Historic Places in Wyoming
