= Tintwistle =

Village in Derbyshire, England

Coordinates: 53.4723°N 1.9724°W

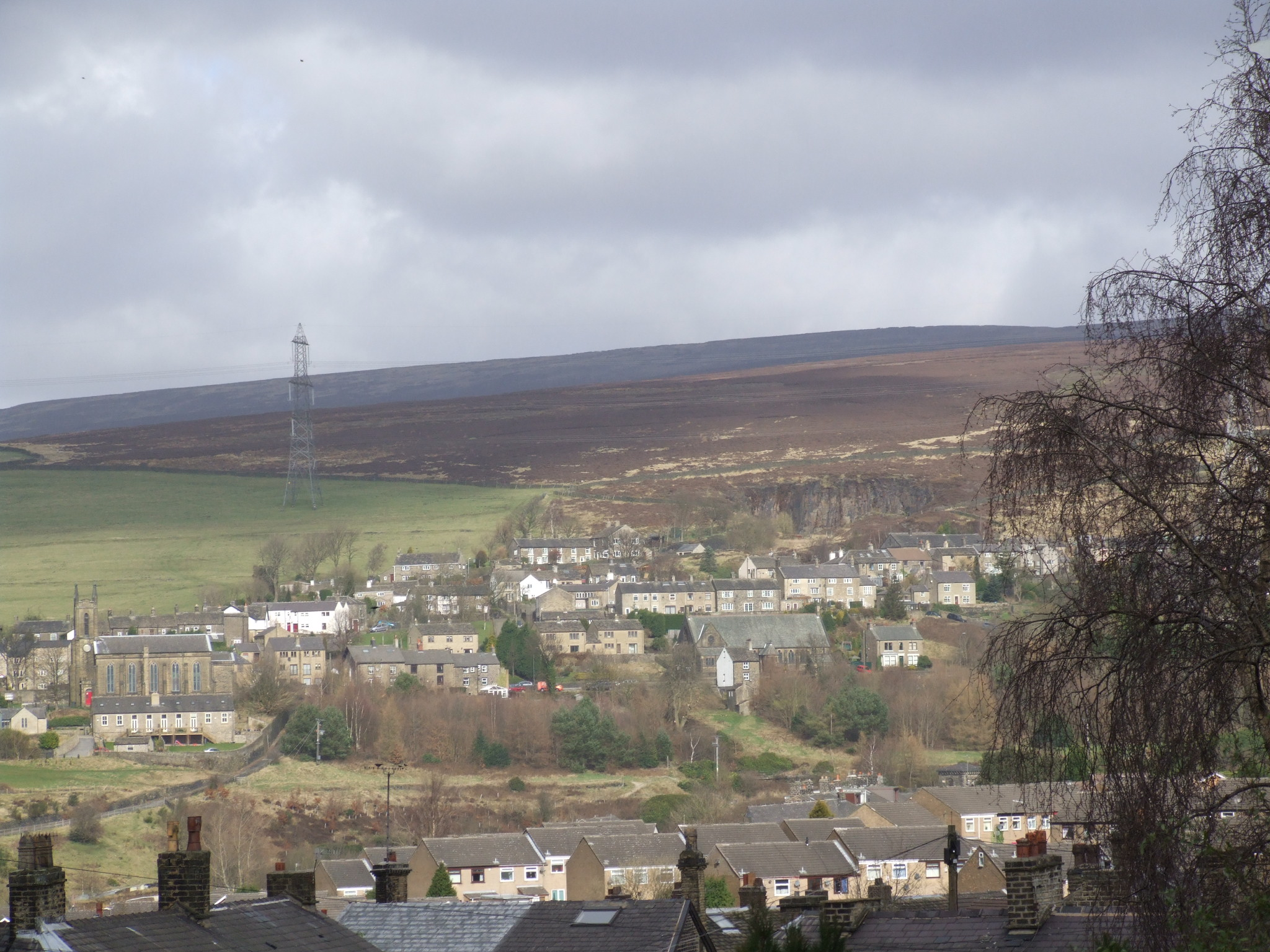
- Tintwistle from Hadfield

- Location within Derbyshire
- Population: 1,400 (2011 Census)
- OS grid reference: SK0297
- District: High Peak
- Shire county: Derbyshire
- Region: East Midlands
- Country: England
- Sovereign state: United Kingdom
- Post town: GLOSSOP
- Postcode district: SK13
- Dialling code: 01457
- Police: Derbyshire
- Fire: Derbyshire
- Ambulance: North West
- UK Parliament: High Peak

Tintwistle (/ˈtɪnsəl/ TIN-səl) is a village and civil parish in the High Peak district of Derbyshire, England, which had a population of 1,400 at the 2011 census. The village is just north of Glossop at the lower end of Longdendale Valley. Tintwistle, like nearby Crowden and Woodhead, lies within the historic county boundaries of Cheshire.

== Toponymy ==
The -twistle part of the name is derived from the Old English twisla, meaning "confluence" (English twistle, compare Haltwhistle, Northumberland). The first part of the name possibly preserves a Brittonic river-name, an old name for the River Etherow, of the *Tīn- type (compare River Tyne).

== History ==
Tintwistle was, until 1974, part of the Tintwistle Rural District in the administrative county of Cheshire. After 1936, it shared the rare but not unique distinction of being a rural district in England consisting of one parish. In 1974, when the Local Government Act 1972 came into force, the nearby urban areas of Cheshire were placed in the metropolitan county of Greater Manchester. Placing Tintwistle in the new non-metropolitan county of Cheshire would have left it an exclave. Instead it became part of the High Peak district of the non-metropolitan county of Derbyshire.

== Geography ==
Tintwistle sits at the western end of the Longdendale valley and is divided in two by the busy A628. The older part of the village sits on the northern side of the road, set back on the valley side. Some buildings in the old part of the village are said to date back to the 16th century, including the Bull's Head public house.

A section of the village is within the Peak District national park boundary and is designated a conservation area. Most of the buildings in the newer parts of the village are of the Victorian period or later and sit closer to, or to the south of, the A628 towards Hadfield. The Peak District Boundary Walk runs south to north through the village.

== Local events ==
The well in the old part of the village is decorated every year as part of the custom of well dressing and there is a Children's Gala held each summer.

Tintwistle has a history of hosting an annual horticultural show which was organised by the British Legion until circa 2002 when it ceased. In 2011 Tintwistle Allotment Gardeners' Association took up the cudgel and started the Tintwistle Fruit, Flower and Vegetable Village Show, which takes place in September.

At Christmas time, Christ Church holds a candlelit carol service accompanied by Tintwistle Band and the Friends of Conduit Street Playing Fields in conjunction with Arnfield Brass, organise an outdoor carol concert and Christmas fayre, centred around a Christmas tree which is decorated by the Children from the Village School.

== Sport ==
Tintwistle has a football club, Tintwistle Athletic FC, a community charter standard club, who challenge in the Manchester Football League and also have up to 20 junior teams. The village is also home to Tintwistle Cricket Club and Tintwistle Crown Green Bowling Club.

== Culture and community ==
Tintwistle is home to two brass bands, the original Tintwistle Brass Band and Arnfield Brass, a splinter group of junior members of Tintwistle Brass formed in 2003.

Conduit Street Playing Fields is the largest open space in the village and site of the only children's playground. In the summer of 2015, dilapidated play equipment was removed from the site by High Peak Borough Council on safety grounds. This led to the founding of the Friends of Conduit Street Playing Fields, a voluntary community group with the express aim of rejuvenating the dilapidated playground and promoting the site's use as a community resource. The Friends were successful in a bid for £40,000 worth of funding from the Veolia Environmental Trust and a further £10,000 was secured by the group through the Tesco Bags of Help fund. High Peak Borough Council added a further £10,000 to the project. With the funding in place, the design for the new park went out to tender for in February 2017. The tender was based upon responses to the public surveys conducted by the Friends group. A winning bid was chosen, partly by public vote, in March 2017 and work commenced on site in early May. The new play equipment was declared open on 23 May 2017. A small, formal ceremony to officially open the park took place in mid‐June with HPBC Councillor John Haken, Executive Member for Operational Services, in attendance. This was followed by a much larger celebration held on 19 August. Since the completion of the renovations the Friends group has organised a number of community events on the site including an annual Christmas celebration with festive music provided by Arnfield Brass and local businesses providing refreshments.

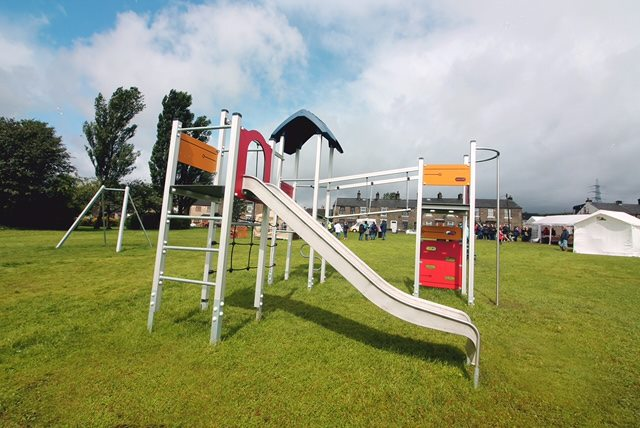
The new play equipment installed on the Conduit Street Playing Fields in Tintwistle, High Peak, Derbyshire.

== Notable locals ==
- Dame Vivienne Westwood DBE (1941–2022), fashion designer, was born in nearby Hollingworth and grew up in Tintwistle. Her funeral was held, in January 2023, at Christ Church in the village.
- Andrew (AJ) Harris, cricketer, is from Tintwistle.
- Nellie Pucell Unthank (1846–1915), Mormon Pioneer, early settler in Cedar City, Utah, was born in the village.

== See also ==
- Listed buildings in Tintwistle
