= Edward Martin (pioneer) =

Church of Jesus Christ of Latter-day Saints member (1818–post-1882)

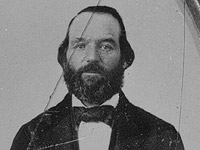
Edward Martin: Age 36

Edward Martin (1818–1882) was a British-American pioneer. After joining the Church of Jesus Christ of Latter-day Saints in Britain, he immigrated to the United States and spent much of his life serving in various positions within the church. He is most prominently known for his role as captain of the Martin Handcart Company, a Mormon Handcart Pioneer company that suffered heavy losses when they encountered harsh winter conditions while traveling through Wyoming. He is one of many figures that played a prominent role in the Westward Expansion of the 19th century.

== Early life ==
Not much is known about Edward Martin's life before he emigrated to the United States. He was born on November 18, 1818, in Preston, England. His parents were John Martin and Ann Slater. At age 18, he joined the Church of Jesus Christ of Latter-day Saints and was baptized by Orson Hyde in the Ribble River on October 14, 1837. He was one of the earliest converts to the Church of Jesus Christ of Latter-day Saints in Britain. He later married Alice Clayton in March 1840 in Preston, England. He was also a journeyman house and interior painter in Scotland.

== Life in America (1841–1851) ==
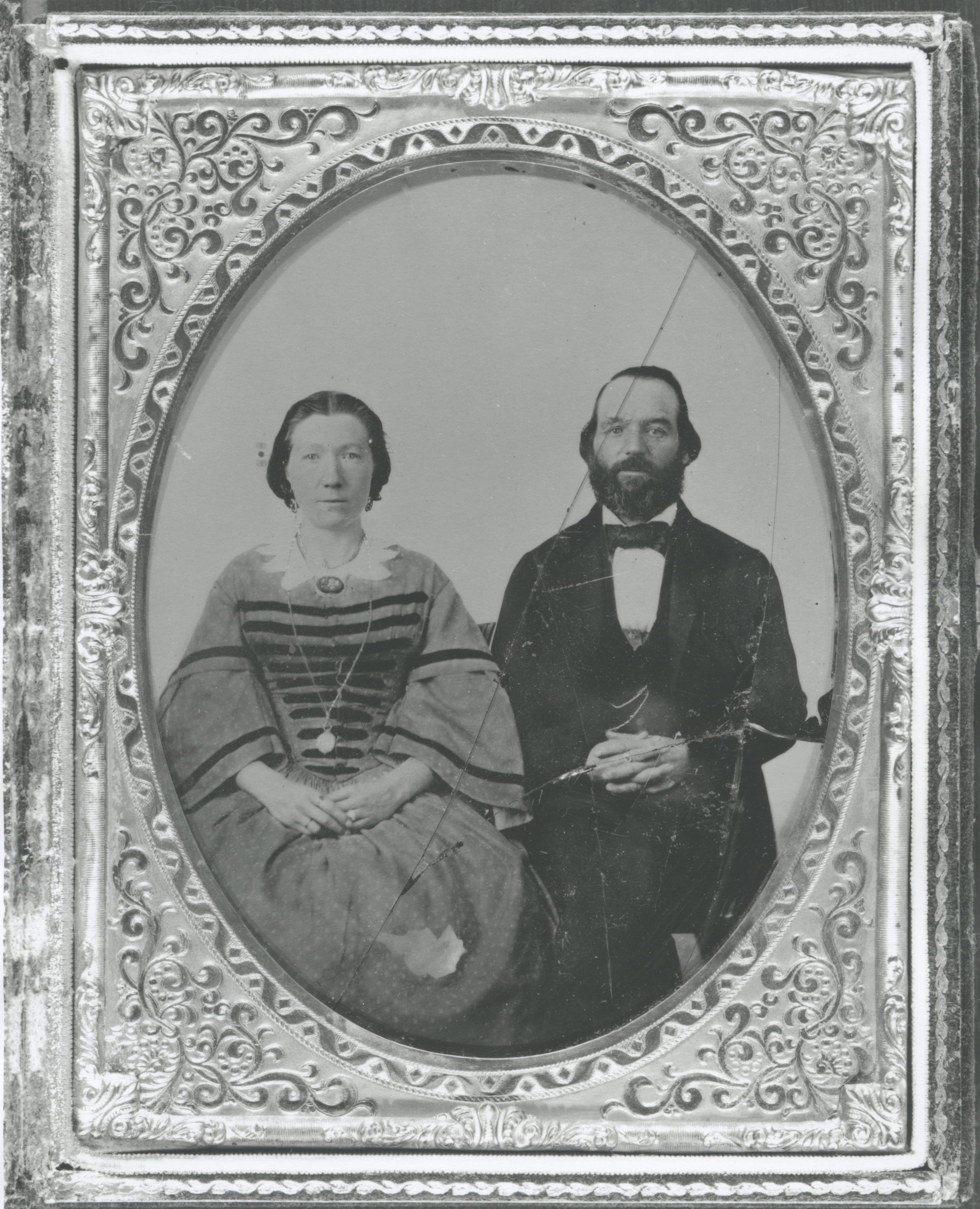
Edward Martin and his wife, either Alice Clayton or Jane Gray

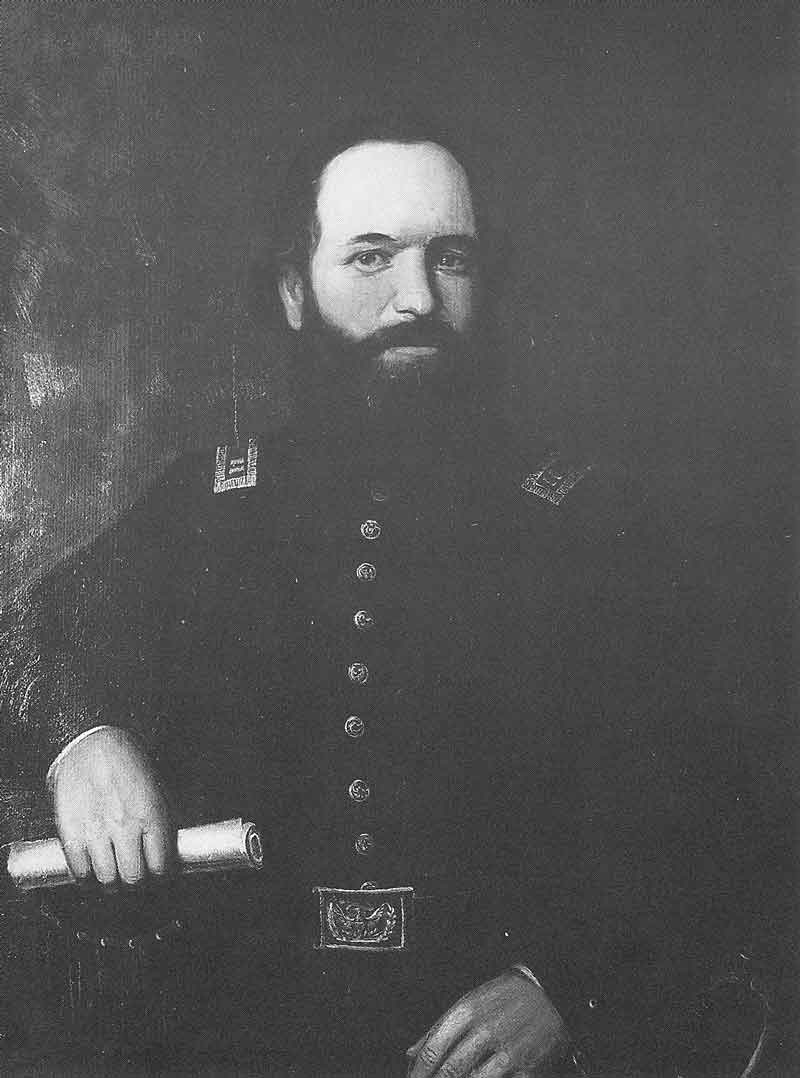
Edward Martin in his Mormon Battalion Uniform

Shortly after his marriage to Alice Clayton, they emigrated from Liverpool to New Orleans aboard the Sheffield, arriving on March 30, 1841. After arriving in New Orleans, Edward and his wife continued their journey up to Nauvoo, where he was ordained a Seventy on October 9, 1844, in the Church of Jesus Christ of Latter-day Saints. He was later appointed to be the senior president of the twenty-fourth quorum of the Seventy on April 9, 1845. The following year, Edward and his family then left Nauvoo on February 15, 1846, arriving in Council Bluffs, Iowa on June 20, 1846.

Edward then enlisted in the Mormon Battalion on July 16, 1846. During his time in the Mormon Battalion, he served as both a corporal and sergeant in Company C. He was discharged in Los Angeles on July 16, 1847, after marching 1500 miles to California in the war with Mexico. He then traveled to Salt Lake City with the Hancock, Hunt, Pace, and Lyle company, arriving on October 16, 1847. When he discovered that his family had not yet arrived in Salt Lake City, he walked back to Council Bluffs to help them, arriving there on December 10, 1847. He reported that he had walked 6120 miles since he left Nauvoo in February 1846.

The following year, Edward and his family departed from the Mormon staging ground with the Heber C. Kimball Company. They arrived with the company in Salt Lake City on September 24, 1848. While in Salt Lake City, Edward was one of the original organizers of the Deseret Dramatic Association, a theatrical organization which played a prominent role in developing a culture among Saints in Salt Lake City, and was very involved in the theatrical community.

== Missionary and pioneer service (1852–1856) ==
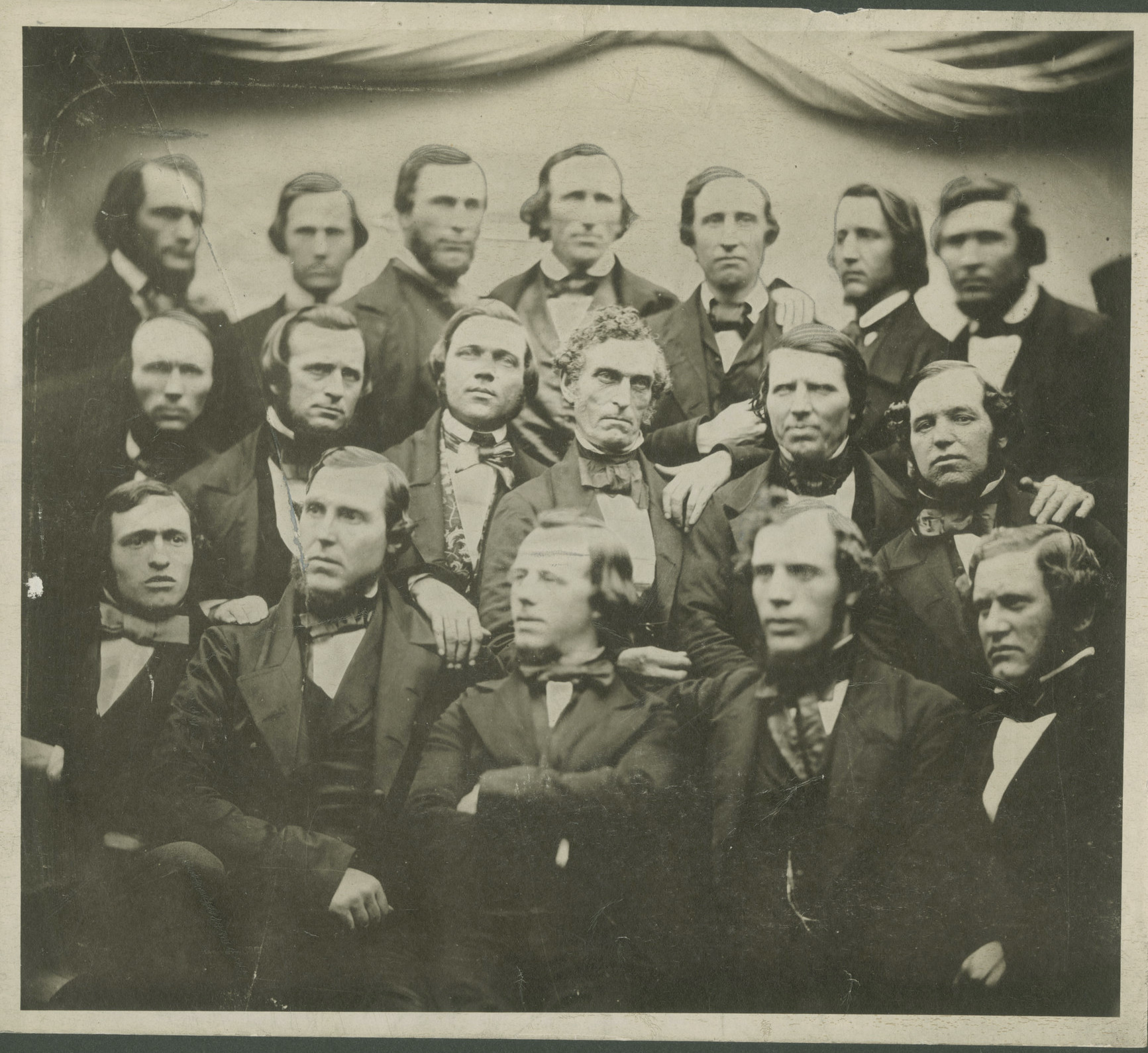
Edward Martin and 17 other missionaries in Liverpool. Edward is on the far right of the middle row.

Four years after arriving in Salt Lake City with his family, Edward was called to serve a mission for the Church of Jesus Christ of Latter-day Saints in England. He served from February 1852 to May 1856, arriving in Liverpool on February 8, 1853. Among other assignments, Edward served as the President of the Scotland Glasgow Conference, where he presided over 20 branches and 1300 members in Scotland.

After completing his missionary labors, he was appointed captain of a company of 856 Latter-Day Saints and served as their Ecclesiastical Leader. He was assisted by two counselors: Jesse Haven, a cousin of Brigham Young, and 68 year old George P. Waugh. The company left Liverpool on May 25, 1856, aboard the ship Horizon. The Saints aboard the ship reported that Edward was very invested in his role overseeing the general welfare of the company, working dawn to dusk and visiting each part of the ship 6 to 7 times a day.

After arriving in Boston, the Saints took a train to Iowa City, arriving on July 8, 1856. Edward was then assigned to be the captain of the fifth handcart company, which officially was known as the Martin Handcart Company. The company contained 575 individuals, 145 handcarts, 8 wagons, 30 oxen, and 50 livestock including some cows. The company departed from Iowa City on July 28, 1856, and encountered early snow storms in October while traveling through Wyoming. They arrived in Salt Lake City on November 30. Although estimates vary, records indicate that at least 100 lives were lost during this journey. While Edward had a detailed account of all of the members of the company, including those who died on the journey, his journal was accidentally burned.

== Life in Salt Lake City (1857–1882) ==
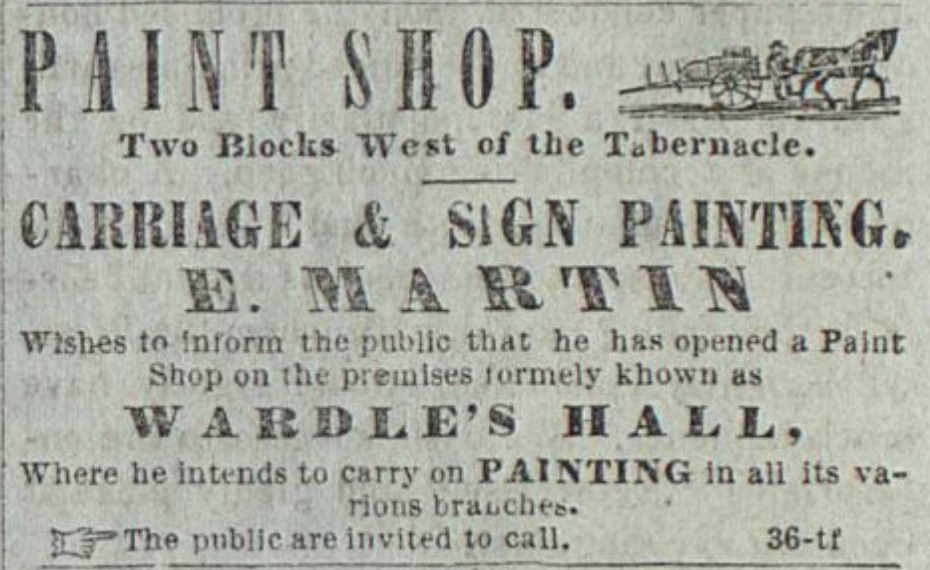
Edward Martin Paint Shop Newspaper Advertisement

Shortly after arriving in Salt Lake City, Edward married Jane Gray on February 14, 1857. He was a participant in Plural Marriage. Edward sought employment in a wide variety of ways during his time in Salt Lake City. He advertised himself as a Carriage and Sign Painter in the Salt Lake City Newspaper, announcing the opening of his new paint shop on the premises formally known as Wardle's Hall, two blocks west of the Tabernacle, in January 1859. He was still working as a painter and glazier in 1861. He then married Eliza Salmon on October 3, 1863. Edward had tough time making a living as a painter, and eventually made the switch over to photography and general store merchandising.

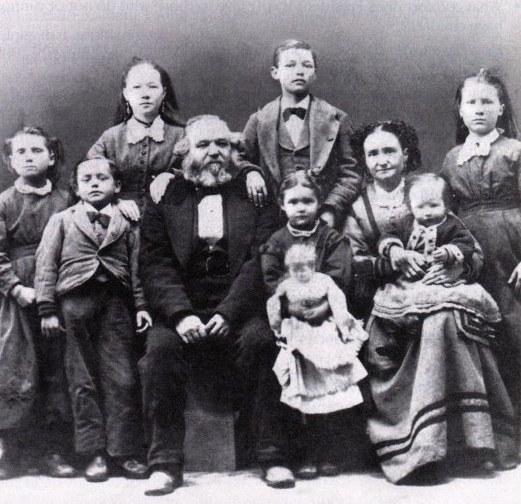
Photo taken by Edward's competitor, Charles W Carter. Contains Edward Martin, his wife Eliza Salmon, and their seven children: Charlotte, Edward Thomas, Emma, Brigham, Eliza, Napoleon, and Martha. Taken around 1870.

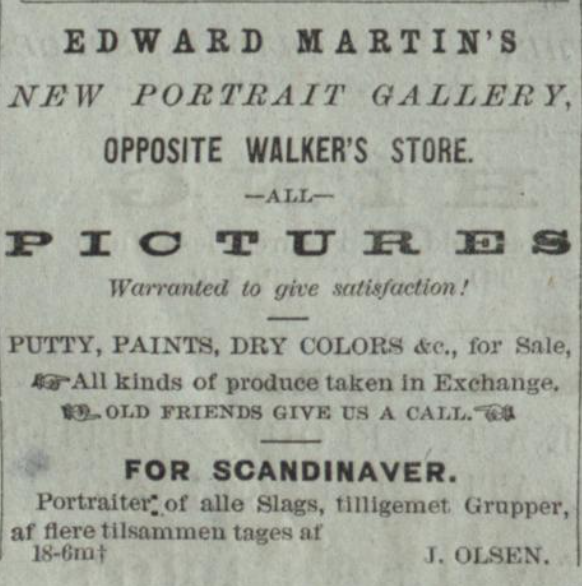
Edward Martin Portrait Gallery Newspaper Advertisement

As he began his career as a photographer, he also participated in various other economic activities such as selling fruit and groceries. He advertised the opening of his new photography galley in July 1865. The gallery was located opposite of the Walker's Store, on the west side of East temple between first and second south in Salt Lake City. He focused primarily on portrait photography, which were printed on Cartes de visite, which were approximately the size of a business card. He also sold other items such as fruit, confectionery, and groceries at his store. He took several prominently known photographs of the new tabernacle, including a series of panoramic views of the Salt Lake Valley from the top of the tabernacle in 1867. By early 1874, advertisements for his photography business largely disappeared from local newspapers and city directories, likely due to competition from other prominent photographers in the region.

Edward was also engaged in a wide variety of other activities during this time. Individuals interested in attending the Anniversary Ball of the Mormon Battalion on July 17, 1865, were required to report to him on or before July 15, 1865. He married Rachel Brimley on August 23, 1869, in Salt Lake City. He had a family photo taken by his competitor, Charles W Carter, around 1870. The photo included his wife Eliza Salmon and their seven children: Charlotte, Edward Thomas, Emma, Brigham, Eliza, Napoleon, and Martha. He was a Real Estate Agent in 1879, and a Hackman in March 1892.

He died on August 8, 1882, at the age of 63 in Salt Lake City's 14th ward. He was buried on August 9, 1882, in Salt Lake City, Utah.
