= William Pitt (Mormon) =

- Born: August 16, 1813; Dymock, England
- Died: February 21, 1873 (aged 59) Salt Lake City, Utah
- Occupations: Band leader, painter
- Formerly of: Nauvoo Brass Band

William Pitt (August 16, 1813 – February 21, 1873) was a prominent bandleader in the early history of the Latter Day Saint movement and the Church of Jesus Christ of Latter-day Saints (LDS Church). His band, known as the Nauvoo Brass Band, was the main band in Nauvoo, Illinois, and played an important role in the crossing of Iowa during the Mormon pioneer trek.

Pitt was born in Dymock, England. He joined the Church of Jesus Christ of Latter Day Saints in 1840. By 1842, Pitt had moved to Nauvoo, Illinois. There he organized a band that originally served as a band for the Nauvoo Legion but soon expanded to performing at a full array of community events.

During the Mormons' trek across Iowa in 1846, Pitt's band not only helped to keep people happy with its music but also raised money by holding ticketed events in communities through which they passed.

Pitt was falsely assumed to be in the original group to go to the Salt Lake Valley with Brigham Young in 1847. However he came in the Edward Hunter Company (1850). In 1852, Pitt served as a missionary in England for the LDS Church. Although his band existed in Utah Territory, it was not as prominent as it had been in Illinois.

Sometime during the 1970s, decedents of William Pitt started using the middle name "Hill" to distinguish him from the many William Pitts in the family line. There is not a single document from his lifetime supporting such a name.
