= Listed buildings in Tintwistle =

Tintwistle is a civil parish in the High Peak district of Derbyshire, England. The parish contains eleven listed buildings that are recorded in the National Heritage List for England. All the listed buildings are designated at Grade II, the lowest of the three grades, which is applied to "buildings of national importance and special interest". The parish contains the village of Tintwistle and the surrounding countryside. The listed buildings include houses and cottages, churches, a chapel and a Sunday school, a former workhouse, a bridge, and a valve station.

== Buildings ==
Name and location	Photograph	Date	Notes
The Old Workhouse; 53.47276°N 1.96712°W		Late 17th century	The workhouse, later converted for residential use, is in gritstone with quoins and a stone slate roof. There are two storeys, and on the front is a doorway with a stone surround, and mullioned windows.
St James' Church; 53.49215°N 1.88117°W		18th century	The porch was added to the church in 1924. The church is in gritstone with a stone slate roof, and has a simple rectangular plan with a south porch. On the west gable is a wooden bell turret. The porch has a round-arched entrance with a keystone, and is flanked by round-arched windows with imposts and keystones. In the north front is a central round-arched window with a quoined surround and voussoirs, flanked by rectangular windows.
Crowden Bridge; 53.49018°N 1.89528°W		Late 18th century	The bridge carries a road over Crowden Brook and is in gritstone. It consists of a single shallow arch with a hood mould, and has canted side walls with chamfered copings.
Millbrook House; 53.46761°N 1.98549°W		Late 18th century	The house, which was later extended, is in gritstone with stone slate roofs and an irregular plan. The north front has three storeys and a single-storey extension, and contains mullioned windows. The west front has two storeys and a parapet. It contains a string course, a tall staircase window with a pointed arch, and two canted oriel windows, and the other windows are sashes. The porch entrance has two canted bay windows and a mullioned window. Linked to the house are a conservatory and a billiard room, leading to the clock tower. The tower has four stages, a round-arched doorway, string courses, clock faces on two sides, and a gabled top with a chimney and a ball finial.
Throstle Nest Cottages and railings 53.46976°N 1.98642°W	—	Late 18th century	A terrace of five gritstone cottages with a slate roof. There are two storeys, and each cottage has a three-light mullioned window in each floor, and a doorway with a stone lintel and jambs to the right. In front of the terrace are railings consisting of eight posts linked by two tiers of chains.
Ebenezer Chapel; 53.47341°N 1.96290°W		1830	The chapel is in gritstone and has a stone slate roof with a south coped gable. In the south front is a central doorway with a pointed arch, a triple-fluted surround, and a fanlight with Gothic tracery, and is flanked by similar pointed arches. Above is a string course and an inscribed and dated panel.
Christ Church; 53.47186°N 1.96855°W		1837	The church is in gritstone with a slate roof, and consists of a nave, a chancel with a north vestry, and a west tower flanked by porches. The tower has two stages, angle buttresses, a west window with Y-tracery, clock faces, single lancet bell openings, and corner pinnacles. Along the sides of the church are five lancet windows with Y-tracery divided by buttresses, and the doorways in the porches have four-centred arched heads.
Sunday School and wall 53.47243°N 1.96665°W	—	1871	The Sunday school is in gritstone, and has a slate roof with crested ridge tiles and coped gables. There is a rectangular plan, a projecting circular south porch with a pyramidal roof, a cross-wing on the left, and a lean-to at each end. The porch is flanked by steps leading to doorways with pointed arches. Flanking the porch are windows with pointed heads and buttresses between, and in the gable of the cross-wing is a rose window. In front of the building is a stone wall with chamfered copings and gate piers.
Arnfield Tower; 53.47045°N 1.98194°W	—	c. 1875	A house in gritstone that has slate roofs with crested ridges and stone coped gables with finials. There are two storeys and a tower, and a double depth plan. On the east front is a porch with a pointed arch and a hood mould under a shaped gable. To its left is a projecting bay with angle quoins, and an embattled bay window. Most of the windows are mullioned and transomed, there are single-light windows, and a dormer with a shaped gable. The tower is square with chamfered angles in the upper part, four shaped gables, and a pyramidal roof with lucarnes.
Bleak House, wall and railings 53.49199°N 1.88034°W		c. 1880	The house is in gritstone and has a steeply pitched stone slate roof with deeply overhanging eaves. On the left are two storeys and two bays under a gable, and to the right is a single-storey wing. In the angle is a gabled porch, the windows are mullioned, with top-hung casements, and in the gable apex is a blind spherical triangle. Along the front of the house is a low coped wall with decorative iron railings.
Valve Station; 53.49181°N 1.88066°W		c. 1880	The valve station is in gritstone with quoins, heavily bracketed eaves, and a pyramidal stone slate roof. There is a single storey, and it contains a doorway and windows with rusticated jambs, triangular-headed lintels, and star-shaped glazing. Inside there is cast iron valve gear.
