= Edmund Ellsworth =

Mormon pioneer

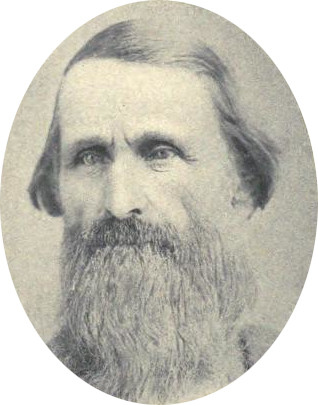
- Born: July 1, 1819
- Died: December 29, 1893 (aged 74)
- Known for: Captain of first company of Mormon handcart pioneers

Edmund Lovell Ellsworth (1 July 1819 – 29 December 1893) was a noteworthy early "pioneer" member of the Church of Jesus Christ of Latter Day Saints. He was noted for his membership in the initial pioneer company, and later for acting as Captain of the First Handcart company of Mormon Pioneers during their emigration from Liverpool, England to the Salt Lake Valley in 1856.

Note: most of the information in this article comes from Edmund Ellsworth's autobiography first published in 1956.

== Birth and early history ==
Edmund was born near Paris, Oneida County, New York, but knew little of his Ellsworth family heritage, except the report that his paternal grandfather had fought under General George Washington in several battles. Somewhere around the time of his birth, his father's death was reported by an uncle due to "the yellow fever" while working on the St. Lawrence waterway. That uncle also dispossessed Edmund's mother and her two children. Edmund also recorded in his autobiography that his mother's subsequent remarriages did not create a very desirable living situation.

== Nauvoo period, 1840-1846 ==
Around the age of 19 or 20, Edmund journeyed down the Mississippi River and upon hearing that his mother had joined the Church of Jesus Christ of Latter Day Saints, Edmund decided to "save his mother from this delusion". He was later baptized with his sister Charlotte and her husband in February 1841, arriving in Nauvoo, Illinois in October of that year. Following his arrival, he worked at the quarry where stone for the Nauvoo Temple was being cut. A journal entry from his son indicates that in 1860 "my father resigned his command of the 2nd Battalion of the Nauvoo Legion", meaning that Edmund was a commissioned officer, a facet of Edmund's life in Nauvoo about which not much has been recorded.

The following year, Edmund married Elizabeth Young, the oldest daughter of Brigham Young and Miriam Works. He later referred to Brigham as "Father", having never known his own father while growing up. During the Nauvoo period, Edmund worked at a sawmill, did odd jobs, and participated in electioneering for Joseph Smith's 1844 campaign for the US Presidency States until he was called home following the assassination of Joseph Smith Jr. and Hyrum Smith at Carthage, Illinois on June 27, 1844. He also reported seeing the visage of the Prophet Joseph Smith after Smith's death upon Brigham Young at a time when church leadership was in question, along with "most of the congregation".

== First migration to Utah, 1846-1847 ==
In February 1846, most of the Latter Day Saints living in Nauvoo, Illinois began migrating by wagon train towards "the West" where they believed that they would be allowed to worship and peace, outside the boundaries of the United States of America as they existed at that time. Edmund made smaller trips back and forth on behalf of Brigham Young to obtain needed items, and also participated in cutting hay, hunting for needed meat, participation in Pitt's Brass Band. As part of the Vanguard company he and operated a ferry near Fort Laramie, Wyoming made by constructing three large hewn-out canoes and framing them together. Although he did not arrive on July 24, with the first pioneer company, Brigham Young promised the ten men who stayed behind to run the ferry that they would share in the honors for the Pioneer's Vanguard Company, and as such his name is included with others at the This is the Place Monument in Salt Lake City, Utah. Edmund and his family arrived in the Salt Lake Valley on 12 October 1847.

== Mission to England, 1854-1856 ==
Edmund was appointed to act as a missionary in 1854, along with Franklin D. Richards who was one of the LDS Apostles, and eight others. He continued to serve in leadership throughout the areas of service, until such time as he was instructed in the winter of 1855-1856 to act as the Captain of the First Handcart Company, made primarily up of new members emigrating from England to the Salt Lake area. The group first traveled by ship across the Atlantic, and riverboat to Iowa City, Iowa. Edmund was a logical choice for this leadership position, given his prior pioneering experience from the vanguard company in 1846-1847, carpentry, and hunting skills, etc.

== Handcart Company leader, 1856 ==
The First Handcart Company departed from Iowa City, Iowa on June 9, 1856 arriving in Salt Lake City, Utah on September 26, 1856. The company had about 280 different people, 3 wagons, and 56 handcarts. The experience of the first company was useful in that due to the green timber, the wheels and axles broke more frequently than expected, and that by tinning the axles and adding iron to the rims, the carts made much better mileage and broke much less frequently. Coupled with axle greasing, these innovations were incorporated into carts travelling in the years 1857-1860. Family tradition is that he passed by his own house and tipped his hat to his family while seeing to the settlement of the handcart pioneers before returning home. Note that by comparison to two of the last two Handcart Companies in 1856, their passage was relatively successful with few deaths along the trail.

== Later years in Utah and Idaho, 1856-1880 ==
Following the settlement of the handcart pioneers, Edmund lived with his families in the Salt Lake County and Weber County areas until 1880, serving in a variety of ecclesiastical and "small government" positions, including the obtaining and driving the pilings for several bridges and superintending the construction of pilings for roads south from the Ogden area towards Salt Lake City, and North to an area called the Hot Springs.

== Polygamy and Arizona arrest ==
In early LDS church history, a number of men participated in church-sanctioned polygamy, including Edmund Ellsworth, who had a total of four wives. Elizabeth Young (m.1842), Mary Ann Dudley (m.1852), Mary Ann Bates (m.1856), and Mary Ann Jones (m. 1856). The latter two "Mary Anns" were both members of the First Handcart Company. He settled with two of the families, intending to bring the other families later, to Show Low, Apache County, Arizona. He was arrested for co-habitation in 1884, close to the age of 65, and sentenced to a fine of $300 which he did not have, or sixty days in jail. Edmund chose not to pay as he did not have the money and also because paying the fine would have forced the starvation of his families. After transport to the Yuma Territorial Prison, Edmund and other served their sentences through the heat of much of the summer, reaching Show Low on 10 August 1885. While the heat had nearly killed him while in prison, he also reported that it had "sweat the heart disease out of him", and that his health was greatly improved.

== Last Years ==
He later moved with one family to the then predominantly LDS area incorporated in 1883 as Mesa, Arizona, where Mary Ann (Bates) Ellsworth is buried, and lived there just prior to his death. He also attended the dedication of the Salt Lake Temple in 1893, and died on 29 December 1893 after six weeks of illness, the result of heart failure.

Edmund's grave and monument stone, is located in the Adair Cemetery in Show-Lo, Arizona along with that of Mary Ann "Polly" Jones.

== Legacy ==
Because of the large families, Edmund Lovell Ellsworth's impact on LDS history in the west and especially with family groups in Idaho, Northern Utah, and Arizona, is hard to measure. Edmund's son Edmund III was later part of the settlement near the Moapa River what is now Clark County, Nevada, and many other Ellsworth descendants have served both church and country in both World Wars. At a family reunion held in 1986, family historians stated that Edmund's families had nearly 5,000 living descendants, a number that has likely tripled or quadrupled since that time. Most are members of the Church of Jesus Christ of Latter-day Saints (LDS Church).
