= Tom Sun Ranch =

Coordinates: 42°26′36″N 107°13′06″W

- U.S. National Register of Historic Places
- U.S. National Historic Landmark
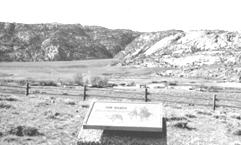
- Overview of the ranch

- Location within Wyoming Location within the United States
- Location: Natrona County, Wyoming, USA
- Nearest city: Alcova, Wyoming
- Area: 4,160 acres (16.8 km^{2})
- Built: 1872
- Built by: Tom Sun
- NRHP reference No.: 66000753

Significant dates
- Added to NRHP: October 15, 1966
- Designated NHL: December 19, 1960

Tom Sun Ranch, also known as Sun Ranch, is a historic site along the old Oregon and Mormon trails, about 6 mi (9.7 km) west of Independence Rock, Wyoming on Wyoming Highway 220.

== History ==
The ranch's builder, Thomas Du Beau Soleil (Tom Sun), was a French-Canadian frontiersman who later became a pioneer cattleman. During the 1870s and 1880s, the ranch was typical of many medium-sized ranching operations in cattle country.

In 1882, The Cheyenne Daily Leader, remarked that "the eastern person of inquiring turn of mind who writes to his friends out west to ask what a ranch is like would find his answer in a description of Tom Sun's."

The ranch site was declared a National Historic Landmark on December 19, 1960. At the time of its nomination as a landmark it was one of the best preserved ranches from the cattle ranging period and was 4,160 acres (16.8 km^{2}) in size.

== Recent development and renovations ==
The ranch remained in the Sun family for four generations until 1996 when it was sold to the Church of Jesus Christ of Latter-day Saints. Since that time some of the ranch buildings have been transformed into a visitors' center for nearby Martin's Cove, an important Mormon historic site. Structures on the site have been stabilized and repaired, but the setting has been impacted by the development of parking lots and landscape designs not consistent with the original historic setting. However, large portions of the landmark area, particularly sections in public ownership, continue to retain their historic integrity.

== See also ==
- Devil's Gate
- List of Registered Historic Places in Wyoming
