= Nellie Unthank =

British-born American Mormon pioneer

Ellen (Nellie) Pucell Unthank (November 6, 1846 – July 21, 1915) was a Mormon pioneer, Utah settler, and amputee remembered as a symbol of pioneer endurance.

Ellen Pucell was born in Valehouse, Tintwistle, Cheshire, England to Samuel Pucell and Margaret Perrin Pucell. She emigrated to Utah Territory from England with her family as a young girl, traveling with the Martin Handcart Company. During the journey her parents died, and she had to finish without them, walking most of the way without shoes. Because of the bitter cold and snow, she suffered frostbite. When she arrived in the Salt Lake Valley, her legs were amputated, using no anesthetic, below the knee. Because of the imprecise amputation, her stumps never healed and were bloody for the rest of her life. She became a symbol for courage and nobility because she did not ask for pity despite her handicap. She did laundry on her knees to help raise six children.

On April 22, 1871, she married William Unthank. She died in Cedar City, Utah at the age of 69. Jerry Anderson created a statue of her with feet that is located on the Southern Utah University campus at the former location of her home.
