= James G. Willie =

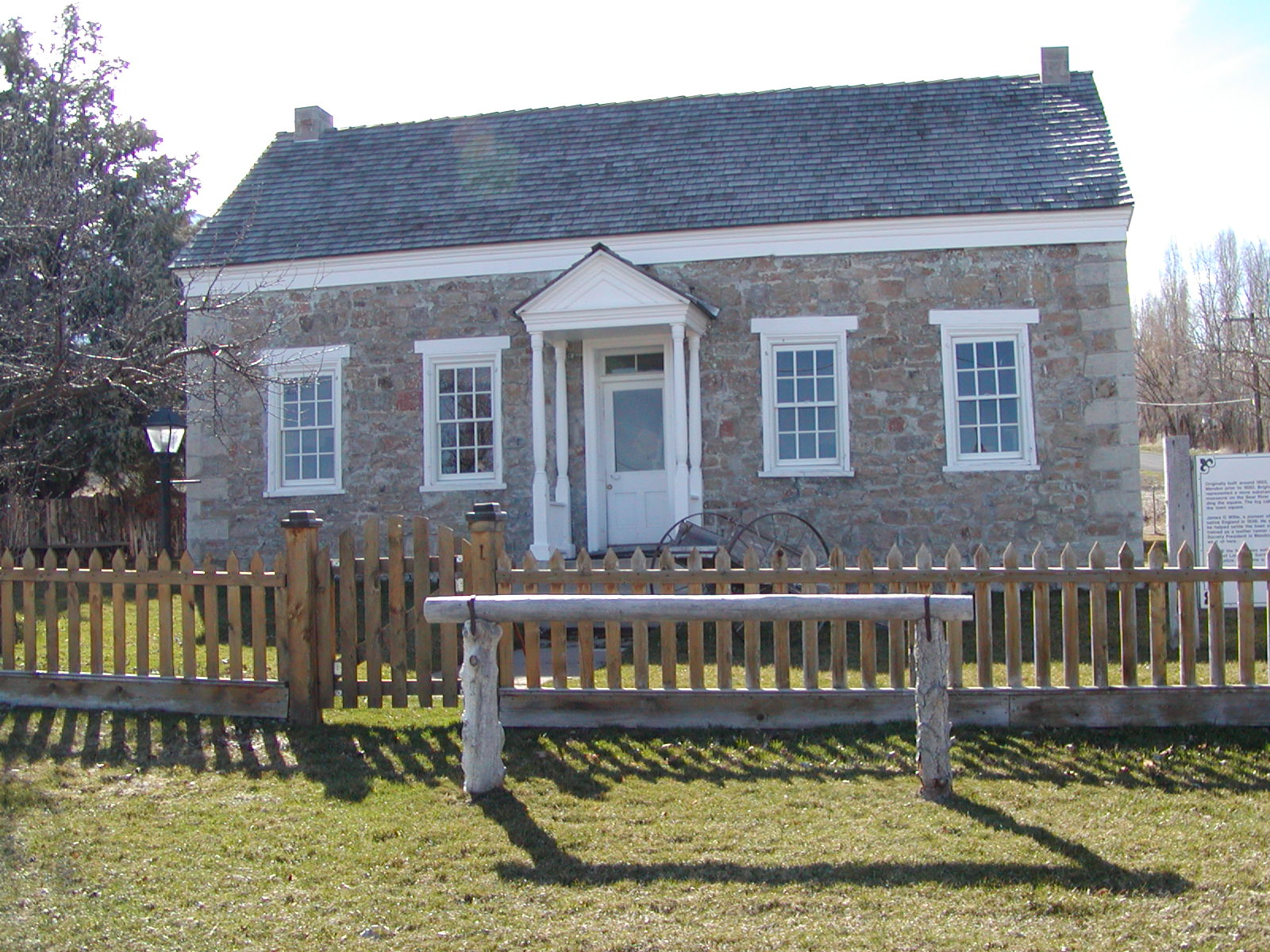
The James G. Willie House in Mendon, Utah is listed on the National Register of Historic Places

James Grey Willie (November 1, 1814 – September 9, 1895) is one of the most well-remembered leaders of the Latter-day Saint handcart pioneers.

== Biography ==
Willie was born at Murrell Green in Hampshire, England. He emigrated to the United States in 1836 and joined the Church of Jesus Christ of Latter Day Saints in 1842.

He first came to Utah Territory in 1847 in Jedediah M. Grant's Mormon pioneer company. In 1852, he returned to England as a missionary for the Church of Jesus Christ of Latter-day Saints (LDS Church). It was at the end of his time as a missionary that he became a leader in the movement of Latter-day Saints to Utah Territory.

He led the fourth handcart company which was one of the two that was stuck in present-day Wyoming in the late autumn of 1856, leading to the death of many of its members. He had previously been the presiding elder over the Latter-day Saints on the Thornton on its journey from Liverpool to Boston. Many of the people on this journey became part of his handcart company.

Later, he was one of the early settlers of Mendon, Utah Territory. He served at times as mayor and postmaster of the town. In 1863, Willie founded the first Sunday School in Mendon. He also served as a counselor in the bishopric and ran a co-operative store.

Willie has been fictionalized in many books, including In the Company of Angels by David Farland.

James G. Willie died on 09 Sept 1895. The entire town of Mendon, Utah turned out for his funeral which was held on 13 Sept 1895.
