= Mormon handcart pioneers =

1856–1860 American religious migrants

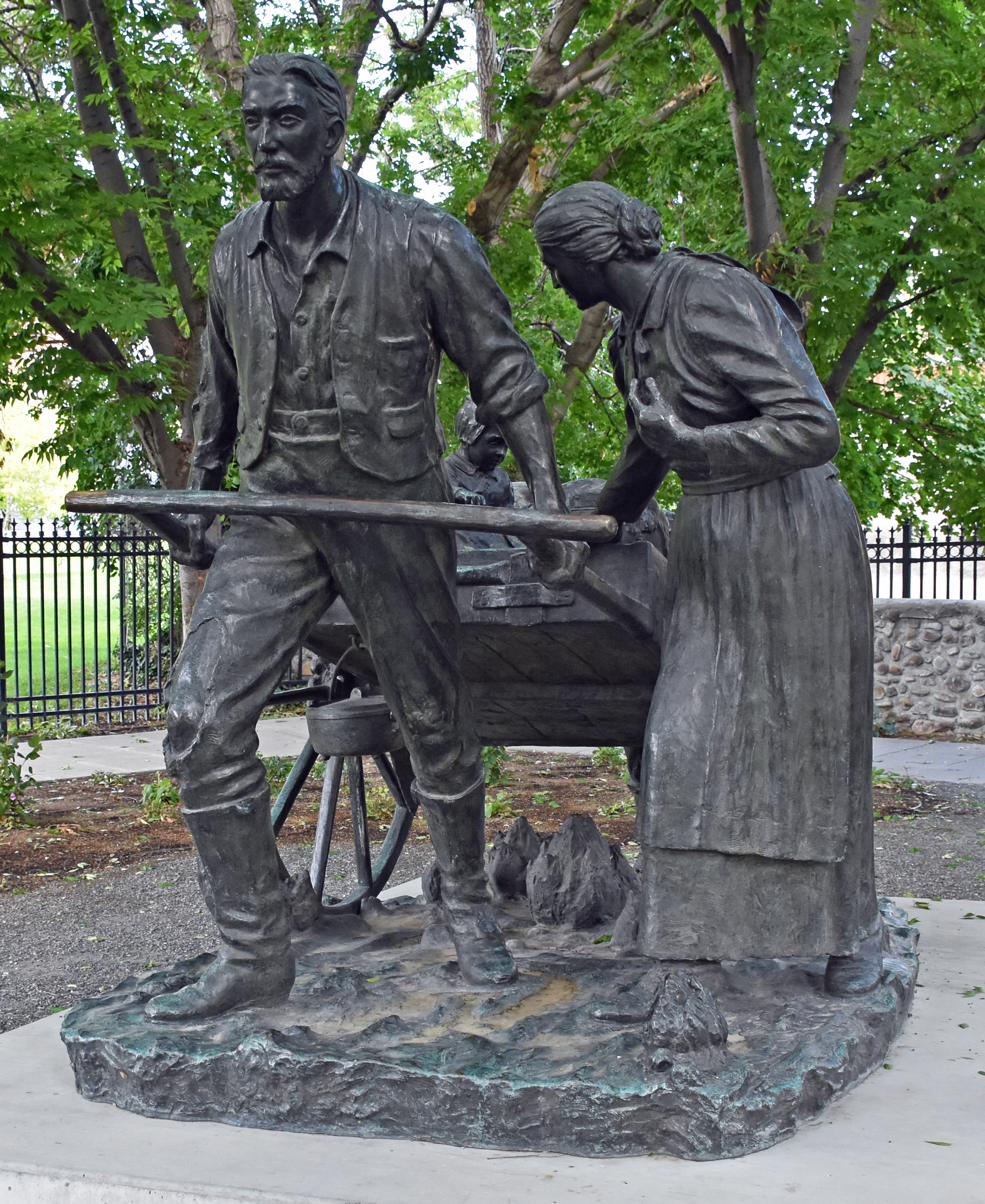
The Handcart Pioneer Monument, by Torleif S. Knaphus, located at Brigham Young Historic Park in Salt Lake City, Utah

The Mormon handcart pioneers were participants in the migration of members of the Church of Jesus Christ of Latter-day Saints (LDS Church) to Salt Lake City, Utah, who used handcarts to transport their belongings. The Mormon handcart movement began in 1856 and continued until 1860.

Motivated to join their fellow church members in Utah, but lacking funds for full teams of oxen or horses, nearly 3,000 Mormon pioneers from England, Wales, Scotland and Scandinavia made the journey from Iowa or Nebraska to Utah in ten handcart companies. The trek was disastrous for two of the companies, the Willie and Martin companies. Both started their journey dangerously late in 1856 and were caught by heavy snow and severe temperatures in central Wyoming. Despite a dramatic rescue effort, more than 210 of the 980 pioneers in these two companies died along the way. John Chislett, a survivor, wrote, "Many a father pulled his cart, with his little children on it, until the day preceding his death."

Although only about five percent of the 1846–1868 Latter-day Saint emigrants made the journey west using handcarts, the handcart pioneers have become an important symbol in LDS culture, representing the faithfulness and sacrifice of the pioneer generation. They continue to be recognized and honored in events such as Pioneer Day, church pageants, and similar commemorations.

== Background to the migration ==
The Latter Day Saints were first organized in 1830. Early members of the church often encountered hostility, primarily due to their practice of withdrawing from secular society and gathering in locales to practice their religious beliefs. Neighbors who were not Mormon felt threatened by the church's rapid growth in numbers, its tendency to vote as a bloc and acquire political power, its claims of divine favor, and the practice of polygamy. Violence against the church and its members caused most church members to move from Ohio to Missouri, then to Illinois. Despite the frequent moves, church members were unable to prevent opposition, culminating in the extermination order against all Mormons living in Missouri by the state's governor Lilburn Boggs in 1838 and the killing of their leader Joseph Smith in 1844. After Smith's death, Brigham Young said that he had received divine direction to organize the church members. In early 1846 he began leading them beyond the western frontier of the United States to settle in the Great Basin.

== Need for handcart companies ==
Soon after the first Mormon pioneers reached Utah in 1847, the church encouraged its converts in Europe to emigrate to Utah. On December 23, 1847, the church leadership sent an epistle to the members in the British Isles saying "Emigrate as speedily as possible to this vicinity." Many British church members were disparaged and ridiculed due to the church's practice of polygamy. From 1849 to 1855, about 16,000 European Latter-day Saints traveled to the United States by ship, through the eastern states by rail, and to Utah by ox and wagon. Although most of these emigrants paid their own expenses, the church established the Perpetual Emigrating Fund to provide financial assistance for poor emigrants to trek west, which they would repay as they were able.

When contributions and loan repayments decreased in 1855 after a poor harvest in Utah, Young began to use handcarts because the church members who remained in Europe were mostly poor. Young also believed it would speed the emigrants' journey. Young proposed the plan in a letter to Franklin D. Richards, president of the European Mission, in September 1855. Young's letter and an editorial endorsing Young's plan by Richards was published in the Millennial Star, the church's England-based periodical, on December 22, 1855. The cost of the migration was expected to be reduced by one-third. Poor church members who wanted to emigrate responded enthusiastically to the new plan—in 1856 the Perpetual Emigration Fund supported the travel of 2,012 European emigrants, compared with 1,161 the year before.

== Outfitting ==
Emigrants departed from an English port (generally Liverpool) and travelled by ship to New York or Boston. The emigrants who arrived from 1855 to 1857 traveled by railroad to Iowa City, Iowa, the western terminus of the rail line, where they would be outfitted with handcarts and other supplies, while later emigrants traveled by rail and boat up the Missouri River to Florence, Nebraska (now part of Omaha).

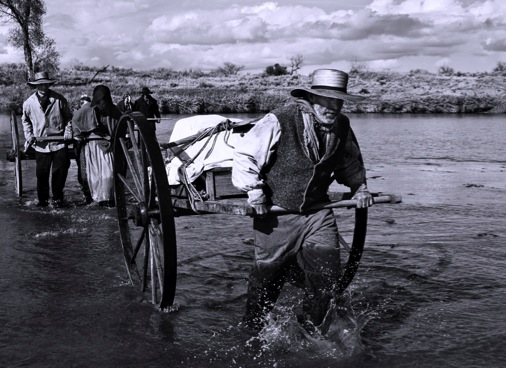
Reenactment: Pioneers crossing the Platte River, from PBS documentary Sweetwater Rescue

Built to Young's design, the handcarts resembled a large wheelbarrow, with two wheels. They were five feet (1.5 metres) in diameter and a single axle four and a half feet (1.4 m) wide, and weighing 60 pounds (27 kg). Running along each side of the bed were seven-foot (2.1 m) pull shafts ending with a three-foot (0.9 m) crossbar at the front. The crossbar allowed the carts to be pushed or pulled. Cargo was carried in a box about three feet by four feet (0.9 m by 1.2 m), with 8-inch (20 cm) walls. The handcarts generally carried up to 250 pounds (110 kg) of supplies and luggage, though they were capable of handling loads as heavy as 500 pounds (230 kg). Carts used in the first year's migration were made entirely of wood; in later years a stronger design was substituted, which included metal elements.

The handcart companies were organized using the handcarts and sleeping tents as the primary units. Five people were assigned per handcart, with each individual limited to 17 pounds (7.7 kg) of clothing and bedding. Each round tent, supported by a center pole, housed 20 occupants and was supervised by a tent captain. Five tents were supervised by the captain of a hundred (or "sub-captain"). Provisions for each group of one hundred emigrants were carried in an ox wagon, and were distributed by the tent captains.

== 1856: First three companies ==
The first two ships departed England in late March and mid-April and sailed to Boston. John Taylor was the church's agent in New York, and he arranged train transportation for the emigrants to Iowa City. Unaware of how many emigrants to expect, Taylor ordered the construction of 100 handcarts, but that would be inadequate for the companies. The emigrants spent several weeks in Iowa City building additional handcarts and obtaining supplies before beginning their trek of about 1,300 miles (2,100 km).

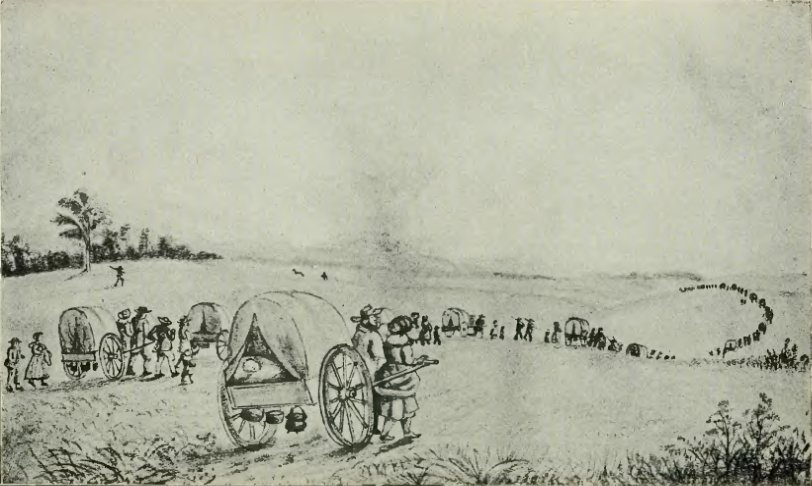
Mormon handcart train in Iowa, 1903 illustration

About 815 emigrants from the first two ships were organized into the first three handcart companies, headed by captains Edmund Ellsworth, Daniel D. McArthur, and Edward Bunker. The captains were missionaries returning to their homes in Utah and were familiar with the route. Most of the sub-captains were also returning missionaries.

Across Iowa they followed an existing road about 275 miles (443 km) to Council Bluffs, following a route that is close to current U.S. Route 6. After crossing the Missouri River, they paused for a few days at a Mormon outpost in Omaha for repairs, before beginning the remaining 1,030-mile (1,660 km) journey along the Mormon Trail to Salt Lake City.

Initial problems with the carts occurred because the wood used to construct them was said to have been "green timber", or wood from trees that were recently chopped down and not given sufficient time to dry, causing an increase in breakdowns. When the first handcart company reached Winter Quarters, Ellsworth had a member of the company "tin" the wooden axles and also installed "thick hoop iron skeins" which enabled the handcart axles to turn more easily and resist breakage much better.

The companies made good time, and their trips were largely uneventful. The emigrant companies included many children and elderly individuals, and transporting handcarts was difficult. Journals and recollections describe periods of illness and hunger; the handcart companies were not able to carry enough food to sustain themselves without additional relief supplies sent from Utah. Hafen and Hafen's Handcarts to Zion lists 13 deaths from the first company, seven from the second, and fewer than seven from the third. The first two companies arrived in Salt Lake City on September 26 and the third followed less than a week later. The first three companies were regarded as having demonstrated the feasibility of emigrating using handcarts.

Handcart company	Captain	Ship	Arrived Iowa City	Departed Iowa City	Departed Omaha, Nebraska	Arrived Salt Lake City	Number of individuals	Number died en route
First	Edmund Ellsworth	Enoch Train, sailed March 23, 1856, to Boston	May 12	June 9	July 20	September 26	274	13
Second	Daniel D. McArthur	Enoch Train, sailed March 23, 1856, to Boston; S. Curling, sailed April 19 to Boston	passengers from Enoch Train – May 12; passengers from S. Curling – early June	June 11	July 24	September 26	221	7
Third (Welsh)	Edward Bunker	S. Curling, sailed April 19, 1856, to Boston	early June	June 23	July 30	October 2	320	< 7

== 1856: Willie and Martin handcart companies ==
The last two handcart companies of 1856 departed late from England. The ship Thornton, carrying the emigrants who became the Willie Company, left England on May 4. The leader of the Latter-day Saints on the ship was James G. Willie. Horizon departed eleven days later, carrying the emigrants who later formed the Martin Company. The late departures may have been the result of difficulties in procuring ships in response to the unexpected demand.

With slow communications in the era before the transatlantic telegraph, the church's agents in Iowa City were not expecting the additional emigrants and made frantic preparations for their arrival. When the emigrants arrived in Iowa City, no handcarts had been built, and three weeks were spent hastily assembling the carts and outfitting the companies. When the companies reached Omaha, additional time was lost making repairs to the poorly built carts. Emigrant John Chislett describes the problems with the carts:

The axles and boxes being of wood, and being ground out by the dust that found its way there in spite of our efforts to keep it out, together with the extra weight put on the carts, had the effect of breaking the axles at the shoulder. All kinds of expedients were resorted to as remedies for the growing evil, but with variable success. Some wrapped their axles with leather obtained from bootlegs; others with tin, obtained by sacrificing tin-plates, kettles, or buckets from their mess outfit. Besides these inconveniences, there was felt a great lack of a proper lubricator. Of anything suitable for this purpose we had none at all.

Prior to the Willie Company departing Omaha, the company met to debate if they should continue the journey immediately or wait for the spring. Because the emigrants were unfamiliar with the trail and the climate, they deferred to the returning missionaries and church agents. One of the returning missionaries, Levi Savage, urged them to spend the winter in Nebraska. He warned them that they could not travel "with a mixed company of aged people, women, and little children, so late in the season without much suffering, sickness, and death." All of the other church elders argued that the trip should go forward, expressing optimism that the company would be protected by divine intervention. Some members of the company, perhaps as many as 100, decided to spend the winter in Omaha, Nebraska or in Iowa, but the majority, about 404 in number (including Savage) continued the journey west. The Willie Company left Omaha on August 17 and the Martin Company on August 27. Two ox-wagon trains, led by captains W.B. Hodgett and John A. Hunt, followed the Martin Company.

Near Wood River, Nebraska, a herd of bison caused the Willie Company's cattle to stampede, and nearly 30 cattle were lost. Left without enough cattle to pull all of the wagons, each handcart was required to take on an additional 100 pounds (45 kg) of flour. In early September, Richards, returning from Europe where he had served as the church's mission president, passed the emigrant companies. Richards counseled the emigrants to be faithful and obedient to their leaders, and promised that the Lord would open a way for them to "get to Zion in safety." Richards and the 12 returning missionaries who accompanied him, traveling in carriages and light wagons pulled by horses and mules, pressed on to Utah to obtain assistance for the emigrants.

=== Disaster and rescue ===
In early October the two companies reached Fort Laramie, Wyoming. They expected to be restocked with provisions, but they were unavailable. The companies cut back food rations down to 12 oz (340 g) per person, hoping that their supplies would last until help arrived from Utah. To lighten their loads, on October 17 the Martin Company cut the luggage allowance to 10 pounds (4.5 kg) per person, discarding clothing and blankets.

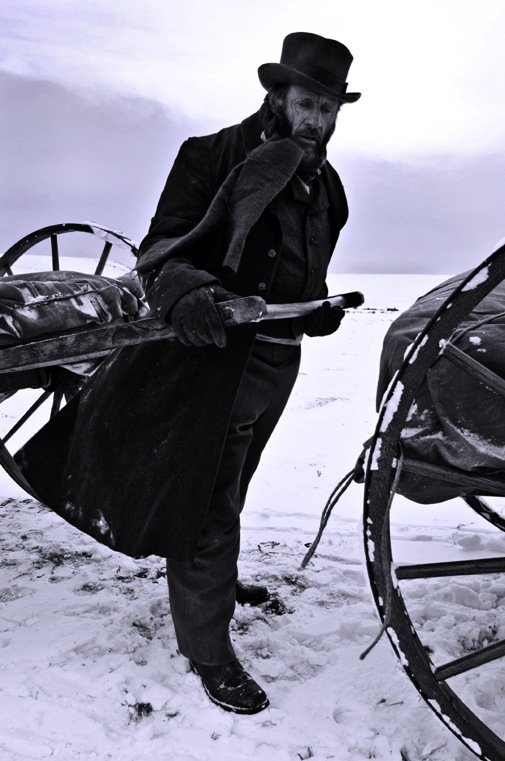
Dramatization of man pulling handcart through snow

On October 4, the Richards party reached Salt Lake City and conferred with Brigham Young and other church leaders. The next morning the church held a general conference, where Young and the other speakers called on church members to provide wagons, mules, supplies, and teamsters for a rescue mission. On the morning of October 7, the first rescue party left Salt Lake City with 16 wagon-loads of food and supplies, pulled by four-mule teams with 27 young men serving as teamsters and rescuers. Throughout October more wagon trains were assembled, and by the end of the month 250 relief wagons were sent.

The Willie and Martin companies were running out of food and encountering extremely cold temperatures. On October 19, a blizzard struck the region, halting the two companies and the relief party. The Willie Company was along the Sweetwater River approaching the Continental Divide. A scouting party sent ahead by the main rescue party found and greeted the emigrants, gave them a small amount of flour, encouraged them that rescue was near, and then rushed onward to try to locate the Martin Company. The members of the Willie Company had reached the end of their flour supplies and slaughtered the handful of broken-down cattle that still remained. On October 20, Captain Willie and Joseph Elder went ahead by mule through the snow to locate the supply train and inform them of the company's desperate situation. They arrived at the rescue party's campsite near South Pass that evening, and by the next evening, the rescue party reached the Willie Company and provided them with food and assistance. Half of the rescue party remained to assist the Willie Company while the other half pressed forward to assist the Martin Company. On October 23, the second day after the main rescue party had arrived, the Willie Company faced the most difficult section of the trail—the ascent up Rocky Ridge. The climb took place during a howling snowstorm through knee-deep snow. That night 13 emigrants died.

On October 19, the Martin Company was about 110 miles (180 km) further east, making its last crossing of the North Platte River near present-day Casper, Wyoming. Shortly after completing the crossing, the blizzard struck. Many members of the company suffered from hypothermia or frostbite after wading through the frigid river. They set up camp at Red Bluffs, unable to continue forward through the snow. Meanwhile, the original scouting party continued eastward until it reached a small vacant fort at Devil's Gate, where they had been instructed to wait for the rest of the rescue party if they had not found the Martin Company. When the main rescue party rejoined them, another scouting party consisting of Joseph Young, Abel Garr, and Daniel Webster Jones was sent forward. The Martin company remained in their camp at Red Bluffs for nine days until the three scouts arrived on October 28; 56 members of the company had died while they waited. The scouts urged the emigrants to begin moving again. During this interval, the party was met by Ephraim Hanks, bringing meat from a recently slaughtered buffalo. The meat likely saved many lives as the nutritive value was much higher than that of the other supplies. He also performed many blessings and helped in some amputations to stop the progression of the frostbite and gangrene that would have otherwise killed more members of the company. Three days later the main rescue party met the Martin Company and the Hodgett and Hunt wagon companies, and they helped them on to Devil's Gate.

George D. Grant, who headed the rescue party, reported to Young:

It is not of much use for me to attempt to give a description of the situation of these people, for this you will learn from [others]; but you can imagine between five and six hundred men, women and children, worn down by drawing hand carts through snow and mud; fainting by the wayside; falling, chilled by the cold; children crying, their limbs stiffened by cold, their feet bleeding and some of them bare to snow and frost. The sight is almost too much for the stoutest of us; but we go on doing all we can, not doubting nor despairing.

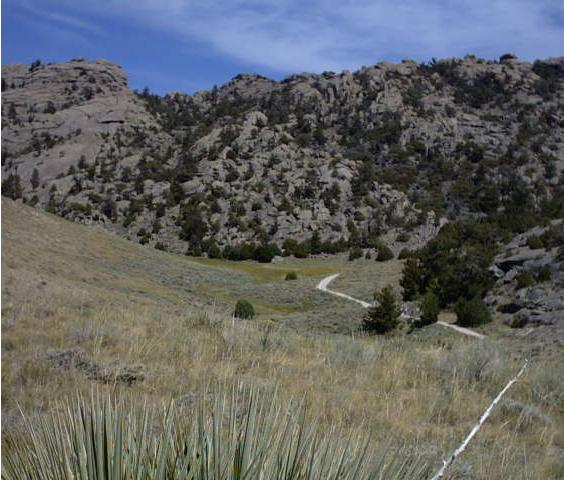
Martin's Cove, Wyoming

At Devil's Gate, the rescue party unloaded the baggage carried in the wagons of the Hodgett and Hunt wagon companies that had been following the Martin Company so the wagons could be used to transport the weakest emigrants. A small group, led by Jones, remained at Devil's Gate over the winter to protect the property. The severe weather forced the Martin Company to halt for five days; the company moved into Martin's Cove, a few miles west of Devil's Gate, as it was much more protected than the open plains to the east. During this season, the river, though shallow at about 2 feet (0.61 metres), was also 90 to 120 feet (27 to 37 metres) wide. The stream temperature was frigid and clogged with floating ice. Some of the men of the rescue party spent hours pulling the carts and carrying many of the emigrants across the river, while many members of the company crossed the river themselves, with some pulling their own handcarts. The rescue parties escorted the emigrants from both companies to Utah through snow and severe weather. When the Willie Company arrived in Salt Lake City on November 9, 68 members of the company had died from disease and exposure.

Meanwhile, a backup relief party of 77 teams and wagons was making its way east to provide additional assistance to the Martin Company. After passing Fort Bridger, the leaders of the backup party concluded that the Martin Company must have wintered east of the Rockies, so they turned back. When word of the returning backup relief party was communicated to Young, he ordered the courier to return and tell them to turn back east and continue until they found the handcart company. On November 18, the backup party met the Martin Company with the supplies so they could continue the journey. The 104 wagons carrying the Martin Company arrived in Salt Lake City on November 30; at least 145 members of the company had died during the journey. Many of the survivors had to have fingers, toes, or limbs amputated due to severe frostbite. Residents of Utah allowed the companies to stay in their homes during the winter. The emigrants would eventually go to Latter-day Saint settlements throughout Utah and the West.

=== Responsibility for the tragedy ===
As early as November 2, 1856, while the Willie and Martin companies were still making their way to safety, Young responded to criticism of his own leadership by rebuking Franklin Richards and Daniel Spencer for allowing the companies to leave so late. Many authors argued that Young, as author of the plan, was responsible. Ann Eliza Young, daughter of one of the men in charge of building the carts and a former plural wife of Brigham Young, described her ex-husband's plan as a "cold-blooded, scheming, blasphemous policy". Most survivors refused to blame anyone. One traveler, Francis Webster, said it was a privilege to be part of the Martin company. One survivor, John Chislett, wrote bitterly of Richards's promise that "we should get to Zion in safety."

American West historian, Wallace Stegner, described the inadequate planning and improvident decisions of leadership caused the struggles of the companies. He described Richards as a scapegoat for Young's fundamental errors in planning, though Howard Christy, professor emeritus at Brigham Young University, noted that Richards had the authority to halt the companies' late departure because he was the highest-ranking official in the Omaha, Nebraska area. Christy also pointed out that Young and the other members of the church's First Presidency had consistently pointed out that departure from what is now Omaha, Nebraska, needed to happen by the end of May to safely make the journey.

Handcart company	Captain	Ship	Arrived Iowa City	Departed Iowa City	Departed Omaha	Arrived Salt Lake City	Number of people	Number died en route
Fourth or Willie Company	James G. Willie	Thornton, sailed May 4, 1856, to New York	June 26	July 15	August 17	November 9	~500 left Iowa City; 404 left Omaha	68
Fifth or Martin Company	Edward Martin	Horizon, sailed May 25, 1856, to Boston	July 8	July 28	August 27	November 30	576	>145

== 1857–60: Last five companies ==
The church enacted many changes following the journeys of the Willie and Martin companies. Handcart companies were not to depart Omaha after July 7. The construction of the handcarts was modified to strengthen them and reduce repairs, and they would be regularly greased. Arrangements were made to replenish supplies along the route. By 1857 the Perpetual Emigration Fund was exhausted; almost all of the handcart emigrants that year and in subsequent years had to pay their own way. With the increased cost, the number of handcart emigrants dropped from nearly 2,000 in 1856 to about 480 in 1857. In 1857 two companies made the trek, both arriving in Salt Lake City by September 13.

With the uncertainty caused by the Utah War, the church prevented European emigration for 1858. In 1859 one handcart company crossed the plains. The emigrants could travel by rail to Saint Joseph, Missouri, after which they went by riverboat to Omaha, where they were outfitted with handcarts and supplies. When the 1859 company reached Fort Laramie, they discovered their food was running dangerously low, so they cut back on rations. The hunger worsened when expected supplies were not available when they reached the Green River. Three days later wagons from Utah carrying provisions arrived to be distributed to the emigrants. The last two handcart companies made the journey in 1860, following the route through St. Joseph. Although the journey proved to be difficult for the emigrants, these companies had relatively uneventful trips and experienced little loss of life.

The outbreak of the American Civil War likely hastened the handcart system's demise by disrupting immigration from Europe and placing severe restrictions on rail travel from the East Coast. At the end of that conflict, the church implemented a new system of emigration in which wagon trains travelled east from Salt Lake City in the spring and returned with emigrants in the summer. The transcontinental railroad was being constructed in the mid-to-late 1860s and was completed in 1869; the railroad terminus gradually moved westward, progressively shortening the trip.

Handcart company	Captain	Ship	Arrived Iowa City	Departed Iowa City	Departed Omaha	Arrived Salt Lake City	Number of people	Number died en route
Sixth	Israel Evans	George Washington, sailed March 27, 1857, to Boston	April 30	May 22	June 20	September 11	149	Unknown (>0)
Seventh (Scandinavian)	Christian Christiansen	L.N. Hvidt, sailed April 18, 1857, from Copenhagen to Britain; Westmoreland, sailed April 25 to Philadelphia	June 9	June 13	July 7	September 13	~330	~6
Eighth	George Rowley	William Tapscott, sailed April 11, 1859, to New York	–	–	June 9	September 4	235	~5
Ninth	Daniel Robison	Underwriter, sailed March 30, 1860, to New York	May 12 (Omaha)	–	June 6	August 27	233	1
Tenth	Oscar O. Stoddard	William Tapscott, sailed May 11, 1860, to New York	July 1 (Omaha)	–	July 6	September 24	124	0

== Legacy ==
Handcart pioneers and the handcart movement are important parts of LDS culture, music and fiction. Arthur King Peters described these journeys as important parts of Mormon history and stated that these journeys caused the qualities of discipline, devotion, and self-sacrifice to be shown among the Mormon people. Wallace Stegner said the handcart pioneers were one of the greatest stories of the American West.

Reenactments, in which groups dressed in 19th-century garb travel for one or more days pushing and pulling handcarts, have become a popular activity among LDS wards, youth groups, and families. The first known modern-era reenactment took place in 1966 from Henefer, Utah, to the mouth of Emigration Canyon by young men from Phoenix, Arizona, using handcarts between metal wheels repurposed from old farm wagons. In 1968, 44 girls from Long Beach, California reenacted that same stretch of the Mormon Trail with homemade handcarts. From the mid-1970s until the early 1990s, participation in handcart reenactments were offered at BYU as a wilderness survival activity for youth conference participants. Beginning in 1977, similar treks were offered as part of Ricks College's outdoor recreation program, on connected jeep trails from Rexburg, Idaho and into Montana.

In 2006, Harriet Petherick Bushman created a concert opera called 1856: Long Walk Home. A musical called 1856, produced by Cory Ellsworth, a descendant of Edmund Ellsworth, was performed in Mesa, Arizona and Salt Lake City in July 2006. Filmmaker Lee Groberg and historian Heidi Swinton created a documentary for PBS called Sweetwater Rescue: The Willie & Martin Handcart Story, first broadcast on December 18, 2006.

== See also ==
- History of The Church of Jesus Christ of Latter-day Saints
- History of the Latter Day Saint movement
- History of Utah
