= Devil's Gate (Wyoming) =

Gorge

Coordinates: 42°26′56″N 107°12′37″W

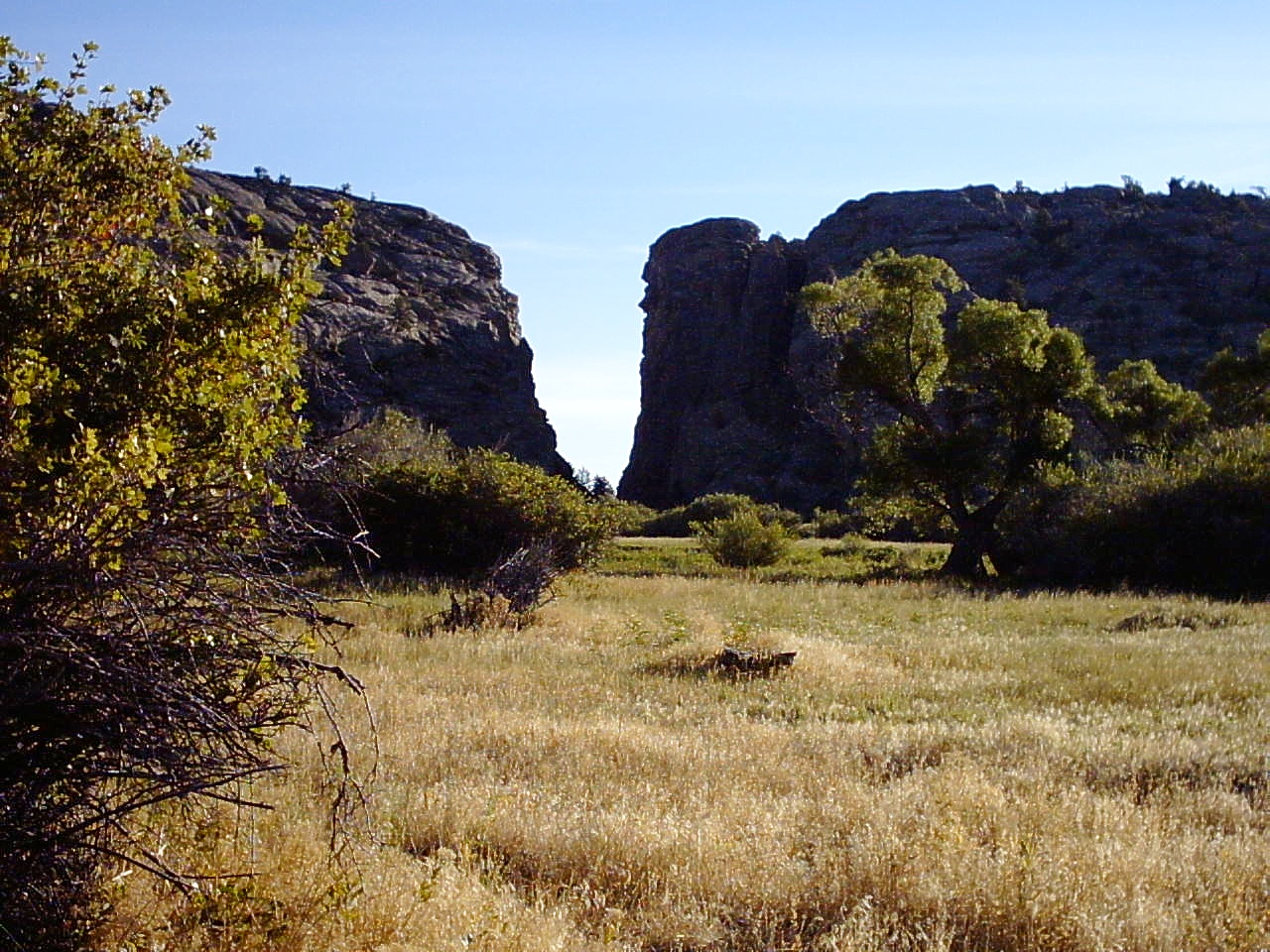
Devil's Gate, Wyoming in 2004

Devil's Gate or Devils Gate is a natural rock formation, a gorge on the Sweetwater River in Wyoming, United States, five miles (8 km) southwest of Independence Rock. Although the actual route of travel did not pass through the narrow cleft, the site was a major landmark on the Oregon and Mormon trails, and is particularly significant in the history of the latter.

Once the Union Pacific Railroad was extended to Benton, six miles east of present-day Sinclair, Wyoming, the Mormon Trail was rerouted through Whiskey Gap in Carbon County, to a point 10 miles west of Devil's Gate to rejoin the original trail.

Devil's Gate is a remarkable example of superposed or an antecedent drainage stream. The Sweetwater River cuts a narrow 100-meter deep slot through a granite ridge, yet had it flowed less than a kilometer to the south, it could have bypassed the ridge completely. The gorge was cut because the landscape was originally buried by valley fill sediments. The river eroded downward and when it hit granite, it kept on cutting.

The site is accessible via semi-improved hiking trails from the Mormon Handcart Historical Center at the Sun Ranch and from the old paved alignment of Wyoming Highway 220, approximately 60 miles from Casper and 12 miles northeast of Muddy Gap. It is on public land.

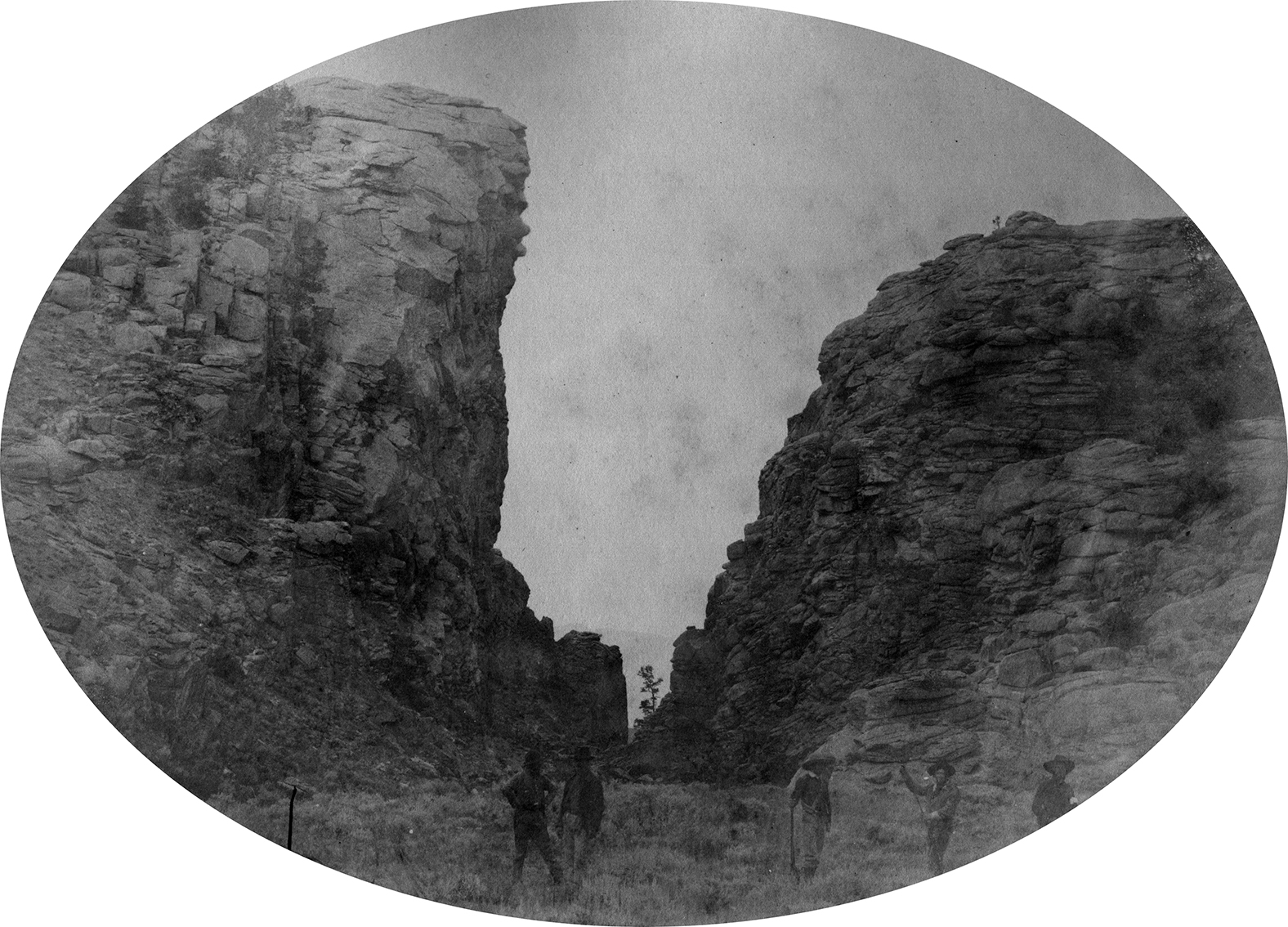
Devil's Gate. By Samuel C. Mills, August 1858.

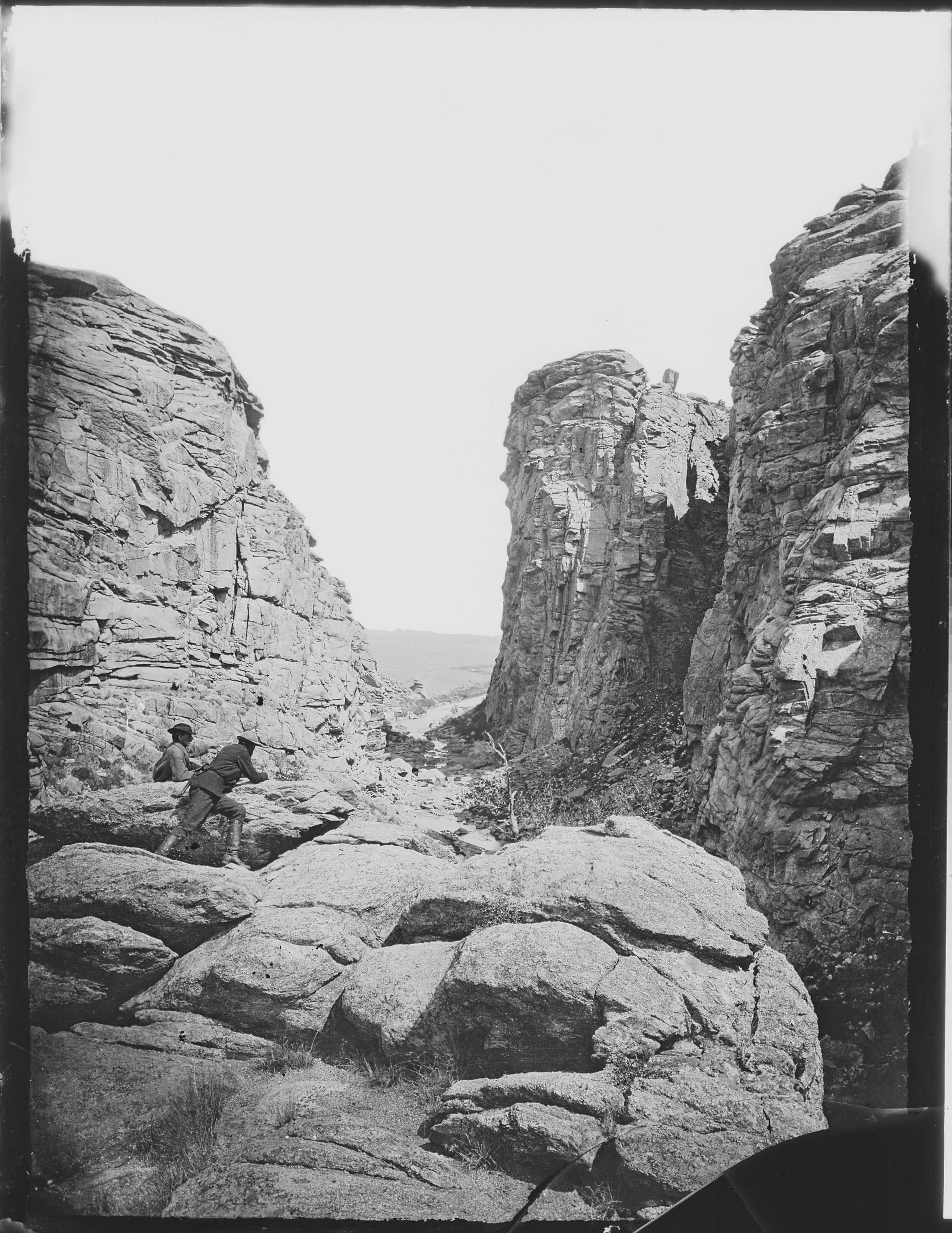
Devil's Gate. By William Henry Jackson, 1870.

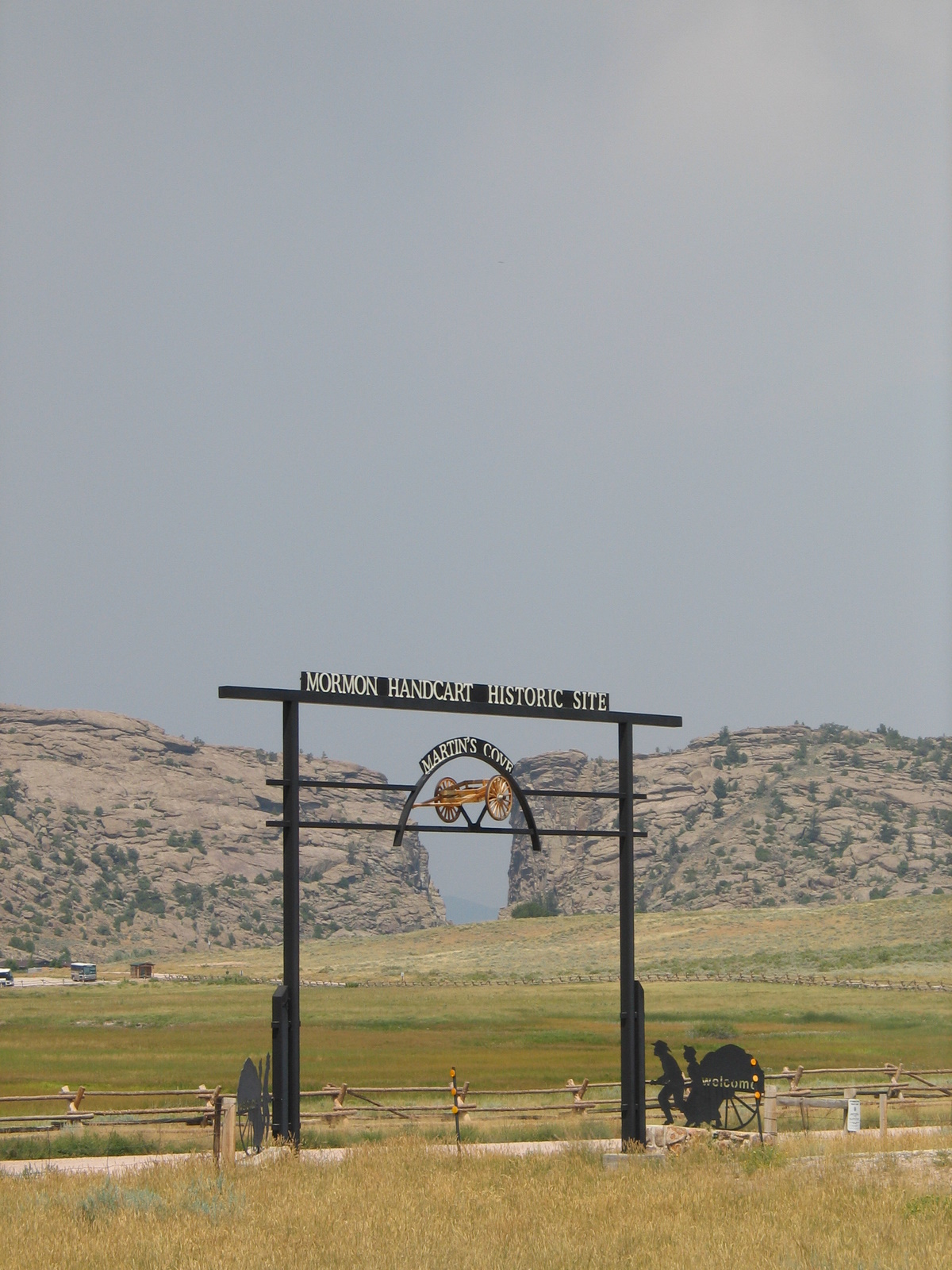
Mormon Handcart Historical Center
