= National Register of Historic Places listings in Laramie County, Wyoming =

Location of Laramie County in Wyoming

This is a list of the National Register of Historic Places listings in Laramie County, Wyoming. It is intended to be a complete list of the properties and districts on the National Register of Historic Places in Laramie County, Wyoming, United States. The locations of National Register properties and districts for which the latitude and longitude coordinates are included below, may be seen in a map.

There are 56 properties and districts listed on the National Register in the county, 4 of which are National Historic Landmarks. One property was listed but has since been removed.

This National Park Service list is complete through NPS recent listings posted November 13, 2026.

Contents: Counties in Wyoming
Albany - Big Horn - Campbell - Carbon - Converse - Crook - Fremont - Goshen - Hot Springs - Johnson - Laramie - Lincoln - Natrona - Niobrara - Park - Platte - Sheridan - Sublette - Sweetwater - Teton - Uinta - Washakie - Weston

== Current listings ==
| | Name on the Register | Image | Date listed | Location | City or town | Description |
|---|---|---|---|---|---|---|
| 1 | Atlas Theatre | Atlas Theatre | April 3, 1973 (#73001933) | 213 W. 16th St. 41°07′57″N 104°48′54″W | Cheyenne | Also a contributing property to the Downtown Cheyenne Historic District. |
| 2 | Baxter Ranch Headquarters Buildings | Baxter Ranch Headquarters Buildings | June 14, 1979 (#79002610) | 912-922 E. 18th St. and 1810-1920 Morris Ave. 41°08′20″N 104°48′19″W | Cheyenne | "Palatial" log house and log barn, moved from Baxter Ranch to Cheyenne, converted to housing. Also a contributing property to the Rainsford Historic District. |
| 3 | Charles L. Beatty House | Charles L. Beatty House | June 28, 1990 (#90001001) | 2320 Capitol Ave. 41°08′21″N 104°49′10″W | Cheyenne | |
| 4 | Boeing/United Airlines Terminal Building, Hangar and Fountain | Boeing/United Airlines Terminal Building, Hangar and Fountain | February 7, 1985 (#85000249) | 200 E. 8th Ave. 41°09′13″N 104°49′13″W | Cheyenne | |
| 5 | Capitol North Historic District | Capitol North Historic District | December 10, 1980 (#80004048) | Roughly bounded by E. 29th and E. 25th Sts. and Warren and Pioneer Aves. 41°08′32″N 104°48′33″W | Cheyenne | A boundary increase was approved December 7, 2023. |
| 6 | Castle on 19th Street | Castle on 19th Street | July 10, 1979 (#79002611) | 1318 E. 19th St. 41°08′29″N 104°48′04″W | Cheyenne | |
| 7 | Cheyenne Flour Milling Company | Cheyenne Flour Milling Company | October 13, 2003 (#03001024) | 810-814 W. 23rd St. 41°08′11″N 104°49′35″W | Cheyenne | |
| 8 | Cheyenne High School | Cheyenne High School | August 22, 2005 (#05000698) | 2810 House Ave. 41°08′41″N 104°49′09″W | Cheyenne | |
| 9 | Cheyenne South Side Historic District | Cheyenne South Side Historic District | October 11, 2006 (#06000939) | Roughly bounded by Warren Ave., Russell Ave., E. 10th St., and E. 5th St. 41°07′38″N 104°48′13″W | Cheyenne | |
| 10 | Cheyenne Veterans Administration Hospital Historic District | Cheyenne Veterans Administration Hospital Historic District | May 1, 2013 (#13000239) | 2360 Pershing Blvd. 41°08′54″N 104°47′09″W | Cheyenne | |
| 11 | Churchill Public School | Churchill Public School | August 22, 2005 (#05000704) | 510 W. 29th St. 41°08′35″N 104°49′36″W | Cheyenne | |
| 12 | City and County Building | City and County Building | November 30, 1978 (#78002828) | 19th St. and Carey Ave. 41°08′06″N 104°49′06″W | Cheyenne | |
| 13 | Continental Oil Company | Continental Oil Company | October 13, 2003 (#03001030) | 801 W. 19th St. 41°07′57″N 104°49′24″W | Cheyenne | |
| 14 | Crook House | Crook House | July 10, 1979 (#79002612) | 314 E. 21st St. 41°08′20″N 104°48′50″W | Cheyenne | Also a contributing property to the Rainsford Historic District. |
| 15 | Crow Creek-Cole Ranch Headquarters Historic District | | July 14, 2009 (#09000565) | 1065 Happy Jack Rd. 41°10′17″N 105°05′15″W | Cheyenne | |
| 16 | Deming School | Deming School | August 22, 2005 (#05000701) | 715 W. 5th Ave. 41°09′01″N 104°49′45″W | Cheyenne | 1945 school with 1948 and 1952 additions, noted for reflecting the growth and civic importance of education in Cheyenne and for its Art Deco/International Style architecture by Frederic Hutchinson Porter. |
| 17 | Dereemer Ranch Historic District | | November 25, 1983 (#83004290) | County Rd. 228; 41°24′58″N 105°07′59″W | Horse Creek | Remarkably unaltered example of a small frontier cattle ranch, with eight contributing properties built 1888–1915 and minimal later construction. |
| 18 | Downtown Cheyenne Historic District | Downtown Cheyenne Historic District | December 22, 1978 (#78003434) | Roughly bounded by 19th, Pioneer, 15th, and Warren Sts. 41°08′00″N 104°48′56″W | Cheyenne | Commercial and architectural heart of a key Wyoming city originating from an advantageous position on the first transcontinental railroad and first transcontinental highway. Expanded three times to encompass 67 contributing properties built 1867–1945. |
| 19 | Dubois Block | Dubois Block | December 2, 2014 (#14000999) | Bounded by W. Pershing Blvd., Dey Ave., W. 32nd St., and Cribbon Ave. 41°08′44″N 104°50′05″W | Cheyenne | Rare block of 20th-century architect-designed homes, with six houses and four outbuildings designed by William Dubois for himself, family, and friends 1909–1940, and a seventh house designed in 1962 by a former Dubois employee for Dubois' youngest daughter. |
| 20 | Federal Office Building–Cheyenne | Federal Office Building–Cheyenne | October 12, 2000 (#00001191) | 308 W. 21st St. 41°08′12″N 104°49′12″W | Cheyenne | 1932 office building expanded in 1937, representing the work of architect William Dubois and the nationwide spate of federal building construction that constituted the United States' first job creation effort in the Great Depression. |
| 21 | Mabel Fincher School | Mabel Fincher School | August 22, 2005 (#05000700) | 2201 Morrie Ave. 41°08′34″N 104°48′27″W | Cheyenne | Cheyenne's only school in pure Art Deco style—built in 1945—and a reflection of the long-standing support for education in the city. |
| 22 | First United Methodist Church | First United Methodist Church | February 25, 1975 (#75001902) | 108 E. 18th St. 41°08′07″N 104°48′55″W | Cheyenne | Finely crafted sandstone church built 1890–1894 for one of Cheyenne's first religious congregations, established in 1867. |
| 23 | Fort David A. Russell | Fort David A. Russell | October 1, 1969 (#69000191) | Francis E. Warren Air Force Base; 41°09′07″N 104°51′24″W | Cheyenne | U.S. military post established in 1867 to guard construction of the first transcontinental railroad, with preserved buildings as old as 1885 charting its evolution from a frontier fort into an Air Force base. |
| 24 | Moreton Frewen House | Moreton Frewen House | April 14, 1975 (#75001904) | 506 E. 23rd St. 41°08′29″N 104°48′49″W | Cheyenne | Rare vestige of the open range cattle ranching era, built in the early 1880s as the city home of colorful British stockman Moreton Frewen (1853–1924). Also a contributing property to the Lakeview Historic District. |
| 25 | Governor's Mansion | Governor's Mansion | September 30, 1969 (#69000192) | 300 E. 21st St. 41°08′20″N 104°48′53″W | Cheyenne | 1904 mansion directly associated with the governors of Wyoming up to 1976. Now a state-run museum. Also a contributing property to the Rainsford Historic District. |
| 26 | Hebard Public School | Hebard Public School | August 22, 2005 (#05000705) | 413 Seymour Ave. 41°07′32″N 104°48′02″W | Cheyenne | 1945 school designed by Porter & Bradley, with 1948 and 1951 additions; reflecting the continued growth of Cheyenne's school system and its first embrace of Modern architecture. |
| 27 | Hynds Lodge | Hynds Lodge | March 23, 1984 (#84003685) | Hynds Lodge Rd. 41°11′48″N 105°15′22″W | Cheyenne vicinity | 1922 group lodge built for Cheyenne's Boy Scouts by a philanthropist; a long-serving venue for local youth activities and social development. Became part of Curt Gowdy State Park in 1971. |
| 28 | Johnson Public School | Johnson Public School | August 22, 2005 (#05000706) | 711 Warren Ave. 41°07′34″N 104°48′28″W | Cheyenne | 1923 Collegiate Gothic school designed by William Dubois as Cheyenne improved educational services in the growing blue-collar South Side neighborhood. |
| 29 | Keefe Row | Keefe Row | August 3, 1979 (#79002613) | E. 22nd St. and Evans Ave; 41°08′22″N 104°48′50″W | Cheyenne | A distinctive and locally unique grouping of nine brick cottages built 1892–1900, showing the pioneer craftsmanship of architect J.P. Julien and contractor M.P. Keefe. Also contributing properties to the Rainsford Historic District. |
| 30 | Ferdinand Lafrentz House | Ferdinand Lafrentz House | July 17, 1979 (#79003679) | 2015 Warren Ave. 41°08′16″N 104°48′56″W | Cheyenne | Well-preserved, early-1880s example of Cheyenne's first frame houses; associated with U.S. Army officer Lloyd Fredendall (1883–1963), businessman and philanthropist Ferdinand W. Lafrentz (1859–1954), and politician Robert N. LaFontaine (1869–1941). |
| 31 | Lakeview Historic District | Lakeview Historic District | August 5, 1996 (#88000560) | Roughly bounded by 27th, Seymour, Maxwell, and Warren; 41°08′34″N 104°48′54″W | Cheyenne | Cohesive neighborhood of modest, working-class houses, with 181 contributing properties mostly built 1880–1930. |
| 32 | Laramie County Milk Producers Cooperative Association | Laramie County Milk Producers Cooperative Association | October 13, 2003 (#03001026) | 2311 Reed Ave. 41°08′12″N 104°49′34″W | Cheyenne | Creamery and warehouse built 1922–23 on a railroad siding, emphasizing how the rail connections that created Cheyenne continued to underpin its early-20th-century commerce. |
| 33 | Masonic Temple | Masonic Temple | October 25, 1984 (#84000162) | 1820 Capitol Ave. 41°08′06″N 104°49′02″W | Cheyenne | Finely-wrought Renaissance Revival Masonic Temple built 1901–1911 in sight of the state capitol, calling attention to the many government leaders among its membership and their humanitarian contributions to Wyoming. Also a contributing property to the Downtown Cheyenne Historic District. |
| 34 | McCord-Brady Company | McCord-Brady Company | October 13, 2003 (#03001028) | 1506 Thomes Ave. 41°07′51″N 104°49′07″W | Cheyenne | Trackside warehouse built circa 1914–15 for a grocery wholesaler, emphasizing how the rail connections that created Cheyenne continued to underpin its early-20th-century commerce. |
| 35 | Lulu McCormick Junior High School | Lulu McCormick Junior High School | August 22, 2005 (#05000699) | 2001 Capitol Ave. 41°08′13″N 104°49′03″W | Cheyenne | 1929 Collegiate Gothic junior high school designed by William Dubois and Frederic Hutchinson Porter, reflecting the growth and civic importance of education in early-20th-century Cheyenne. Now the Emerson Building. |
| 36 | McDonald Ranch | | May 14, 1987 (#87000777) | Iron Mountain Rd. 41°39′15″N 105°02′05″W | Chugwater vicinity | Successful cattle ranch established in 1881; an economic cornerstone of the area, whose six contributing properties exemplify the buildings and layout of late-19th and early-20th-century ranches. |
| 37 | Moore Haven Heights Historic District | Moore Haven Heights Historic District | January 8, 2009 (#08001305) | Between Bent Ave. on the west, the eastern side of Central Ave. on the east, W. 8th Ave. on the north, and W. Pershing Blvd. on the south 41°08′59″N 104°49′31″W | Cheyenne | Cohesive white-collar neighborhood established in 1926, representing Cheyenne's residential growth amid widespread automobile ownership, with 445 contributing properties characterized by brick Tudor Revival architecture early on and ranch-style houses from the 1950s. |
| 38 | Mt. Sinai Synagogue | | September 5, 2017 (#100001575) | 2610 Pioneer Ave. 41°08′27″N 104°49′26″W | Cheyenne | Synagogue built 1949–1951, noted for its mid-century modern architecture. |
| 39 | Nagle–Warren Mansion | Nagle–Warren Mansion | July 12, 1976 (#76001955) | 222 E. 17th St. 41°08′06″N 104°48′46″W | Cheyenne | Opulent Romanesque Revival mansion built 1886–88 for pioneer entrepreneur and politician Erasmus Nagle (1833–1890). Also a contributing property to the Rainsford Historic District. |
| 40 | Park Addition School | Park Addition School | August 22, 2005 (#05000703) | 1100 Richardson Ct. 41°08′33″N 104°50′02″W | Cheyenne | 1921 neighborhood school reflecting the importance placed on education in early-20th-century Cheyenne. Also noted for its eclectic mix of Prairie School, American Craftsman, and Sullivanesque architecture. |
| 41 | Pine Bluffs High School | Pine Bluffs High School | March 21, 1996 (#96000228) | 607 Elm St. 41°10′42″N 104°03′59″W | Pine Bluffs | 1929 Neoclassical high school attesting to the growth, development, and civic pride surrounding secondary education in the early 20th century. Also noted as a master work of architect Eugene G. Groves with his signature concrete elements. |
| 42 | Quebec 01 Launch Control Facility | Quebec 01 Launch Control Facility | December 11, 2023 (#100009836) | 2025 Road 238 (southwest of Exit 39, Interstate 25); 41°32′36″N 104°54′10″W | Chugwater vicinity | Missile launch control center active 1965–2005, with 14 contributing properties illustrating the nuclear deterrence strategy of the Cold War. Opened as a Wyoming state historic site in 2019. |
| 43 | Rainsford Historic District | Rainsford Historic District | November 6, 1984 (#84003884) | Roughly bounded by Morrie, 22nd, Warren, and 17th Sts. 41°08′18″N 104°48′38″W | Cheyenne | Affluent residential neighborhood with 294 contributing properties built 1885–1933, marked by the boom and bust of cattle ranching, locally and nationally prominent residents, the western architectural adaptations of George Rainsford, and architectural embellishments shipped in by rail. |
| 44 | Remount Ranch | Remount Ranch | September 19, 1990 (#90001389) | Remount Ranch Rd., 1 mile south of U.S. Route 80; 41°05′21″N 105°15′07″W | Cheyenne vicinity | Pioneer ranch with eight contributing properties, established c.-1875–1886 and expanded 1930–1946 while the home of author Mary O'Hara (1885–1980), who wrote My Friend Flicka and several other bestselling novels there. |
| 45 | St. Mark's Episcopal Church | St. Mark's Episcopal Church | February 26, 1970 (#70000673) | 1908 Central Ave. 41°08′09″N 104°48′59″W | Cheyenne | Prominent church designed by Henry Martyn Congdon and built 1886–1888, with a bell tower added in 1925. |
| 46 | St. Mary's Catholic Cathedral | St. Mary's Catholic Cathedral | November 20, 1974 (#74002026) | 2107 Capitol Ave. 41°08′16″N 104°49′04″W | Cheyenne | Commanding Gothic Revival cathedral built 1907–1909. |
| 47 | Storey Gymnasium | Storey Gymnasium | August 22, 2005 (#05000707) | 2811 House Ave. 41°08′43″N 104°49′07″W | Cheyenne | Freestanding 1950 gymnasium built to incorporate physical education and athletics into Cheyenne's high school curriculum. Designed by Frederic Hutchinson Porter with space for ROTC programs. |
| 48 | William Sturgis House | William Sturgis House | November 8, 1982 (#82001833) | 821 E. 17th St. 41°08′13″N 104°48′21″W | Cheyenne | 1884 Shingle style house designed by George D. Rainsford for cattle baron William Sturgis, a key player in the economic development of Cheyenne. Also a contributing property to the Rainsford Historic District. |
| 49 | Texas Oil Company | Texas Oil Company | October 13, 2003 (#03001025) | 1120–1122 W. 23rd St. 41°08′06″N 104°49′49″W | Cheyenne | Two trackside warehouses built c. 1915, emphasizing how the rail connections that created Cheyenne continued to underpin its early-20th-century commerce. |
| 50 | United States Post Office and Court House | United States Post Office and Court House | June 5, 2017 (#100001052) | 2120 Capitol Ave. 41°08′15″N 104°49′08″W | Cheyenne | Officially the Joseph C. O'Mahoney Federal Center, built in 1965 incorporating a formal plaza and a Robert Russin sculpture. Noted for representing the work of architect Frederic H. Porter and the nation's 1960s spate of new federal building construction under modernized design principles. |
| 51 | Union Pacific Railroad Depot | Union Pacific Railroad Depot | January 29, 1973 (#73001934) | 121 W. 15th St. 41°07′54″N 104°48′51″W | Cheyenne | Richardsonian Romanesque train station designed by Henry Van Brunt and built 1886–87; the last grandiose 19th-century depot on the first transcontinental railroad and a symbol of the Union Pacific. Also a contributing property to the Downtown Cheyenne Historic District. Now the Cheyenne Depot Museum. |
| 52 | Union Pacific Roundhouse, Turntable and Machine Shop | Union Pacific Roundhouse, Turntable and Machine Shop | July 24, 1992 (#92000930) | 121 W. 15th St. 41°07′47″N 104°48′51″W | Cheyenne | 1919 machine shop, 1931 roundhouse, and 1941 turntable—still-operating infrastructure from the age of steam locomotives, and symbols of the further development of Cheyenne and Wyoming along the first transcontinental railroad. |
| 53 | Van Tassell Carriage Barn | Van Tassell Carriage Barn | September 13, 1978 (#78002829) | 1010 E. 16th St. 41°08′17″N 104°48′13″W | Cheyenne | One of Cheyenne's last grand carriage barns—designed by George D. Rainsford in 1886—and the only surviving building from the estate of cattle baron Robert S. Van Tassell (1845–1931). Moved to Holliday Park, where it's housed the Cheyenne Artists Guild since 1967. |
| 54 | Whipple–Lacey House | Whipple–Lacey House | May 15, 1980 (#80004050) | 300 E. 17th St. 41°08′07″N 104°48′45″W | Cheyenne | Ornate 1883 house successively owned by two pioneer leaders: banker, entrepreneur, and stockman Ithamar C. Whipple (1839–1912), and Territorial Supreme Court chief justice John W. Lacey (1848–1936). Also a contributing property to the Rainsford Historic District. |
| 55 | Wyoming Fuel Company | Wyoming Fuel Company | October 13, 2003 (#03001029) | 720 W. 18th St. 41°07′56″N 104°49′23″W | Cheyenne | Railside warehouse built in 1929 and expanded in 1937, representing Cheyenne's early-20th-century commercial activity and the city's only surviving warehouse designed by William Dubois. |
| 56 | Wyoming State Capitol and Grounds | Wyoming State Capitol and Grounds | January 29, 1973 (#73001935) | 200 W. 24th St. 41°08′25″N 104°49′13″W | Cheyenne | Long-serving seat of Wyoming's government, built 1886–1890; noted for its Renaissance Revival architecture, central role in state history, and national leadership in women's suffrage. |

== Former listings ==
| | Name on the Register | Image | Date listed | Date removed | Location | City or town | Description |
|---|---|---|---|---|---|---|---|
| 1 | Corlett School | | August 22, 2005 (#05000702) | December 1, 2015 | 600 W. 22nd St. | Cheyenne | Demolished in 2006. |

== See also ==
- List of National Historic Landmarks in Wyoming
- National Register of Historic Places listings in Wyoming
