= Timeline of Cheyenne, Wyoming =

Coordinates: 41.145556°N 104.801944°W

The following is a timeline of the history of the city of Cheyenne, Wyoming, USA.

== 19th century ==
- 1867
  - July 4: Union Pacific Railroad sets up mountain region headquarters at Crow Creek Crossing, later known as Cheyenne.
  - August 10: H. M. Hook elected mayor.
  - Fort D.A. Russell established nearby.
  - Cheyenne Leader newspaper begins publication.
  - November 13: Railroad begins operating.
- 1868 - City charter granted by Dakota Territory legislature.
- 1869
  - May 25: Wyoming Territory court in session.
  - Wyoming Tribune newspaper begins publication.
  - Fire.
  - Eagle Hotel in business.
  - Population: 2,305.
- 1870
  - On September 14, 1870, the signature of General Grenville M. Dodge on the Original City Plat of Cheyenne, Wyoming Territory, was notarized.
  - On September 21, 1870, at 10:30 AM, the Cheyenne Original City Plat was recorded by Laramie County Clerk.
- 1872
  - Stock Association of Laramie County organized.
  - Court House built.
- 1873 - November: Legislative Assembly of Wyoming Territory in session.
- 1874 - City Hall built.
- 1876
  - Cheyenne and Black Hills Stage begins operating.
  - Population: 3,250 (estimate).
- 1881 - Joseph M. Carey becomes mayor.
- 1882 - Opera House built.
- 1884 - William Sturgis House (residence) built.
- 1885 - Francis E. Warren becomes mayor.
- 1886
  - Library opens on Carey Avenue.
  - St. Mark's Episcopal Church built.
  - Cheyenne and Northern Railway operates from 1886 to 1890.
- 1887 - Cheyenne Depot built.
- 1888 - Nagle Warren Mansion (residence) built.
- 1890
  - July 10: Cheyenne becomes capital of new state of Wyoming.
  - Wyoming State Capitol building and First United Methodist Church constructed.
  - Population: 11,690.
- 1892 - Tivoli Building constructed.
- 1895 - Wyoming State Museum established.
- 1896 - Cheyenne Business College established.
- 1897 - Cheyenne Frontier Days begin.
- 1900 - Population: 14,087.

== 20th century ==
- 1902 - Laramie County Library opens.
- 1903 - May: Theodore Roosevelt visits Cheyenne.
- 1904 - Wyoming Governor's Mansion built.
- 1905 - Population: 13,656.
- 1908 - Atlas Theatre opens.
- 1909 - St. Mary's Catholic Cathedral consecrated.
- 1910 - Population: 11,320.
- 1914 - City adopts commissioner form of government.
- 1920 - Lincoln Highway surfaced near Cheyenne.
- 1928 - High Plains Horticulture Research Station established.
- 1929 - Boeing Terminal built at Cheyenne Airport.
- 1930 - Cheyenne Little Theatre Players founded.
- 1937 - Wyoming Governmental Research Association headquartered in Cheyenne.
- late 1940's - Union Pacific Big Boy an articulated 4-8-8-4 steam locomotive, was assigned to Cheyenne, Wyoming, where they hauled freight over Sherman Hill to Laramie, Wyoming.
- 1952 - Cheyenne Genealogy Society formed.
- 1960 - Cheyenne East High School established.
- 1968 - Laramie County Community College established.
- 1972 - City government changes to mayor-council format.
- 1976 - New Wyoming Governor's Mansion built.
- 1977 - Cheyenne Community Solar Greenhouse and Historic Governor's Mansion museum opens.
- 1978 - Cheyenne Frontier Days Old West Museum founded.
- 1979 - July 16: Tornado.
- 1980 - Population: 47,283.
- 1981 - Frontier Mall in business.
- 1993 - Cheyenne Depot Museum founded.
- 1999 - City website online (approximate date).
- 2000 - Taco John's Events Center opens.

== 21st century ==
- 2009
  - Rick Kaysen becomes mayor.
  - Cheyenne South High School opens.
- 2010
  - Cheyenne Capidolls roller derby league formed.
  - Population: 59,466.
- 2011 - Cheyenne Warriors football team and Arts Alliance of Cheyenne formed.
- 2012 - National Center for Atmospheric Research-Wyoming Supercomputing Center begins operating.
- 2013 - Arts Cheyenne organized (approximate date).

== See also ==
- List of mayors of Cheyenne, Wyoming
- National Register of Historic Places listings in Laramie County, Wyoming

== Bibliography ==
- Mrs. Frank Leslie (1877), "(Cheyenne)", California: a pleasure trip from Gotham to the Golden Gate, April, May, June, 1877, New York: G.W. Carleton & Co. Publishers
- "Cheyenne", The American Cyclopaedia, New York: D. Appleton, 1883
- "Cheyenne", The Pacific Tourist: an Illustrated Guide to Pacific RR, California, and Pleasure Resorts across the Continent, New York: Adams & Bishop, 1884
- "Cheyenne City". Colorado, New Mexico, Utah, Nevada, Wyoming and Arizona Gazetteer and Business Directory. Chicago: Polk & Co. and A.C. Danser. 1884.
- "Cheyenne". Appleton's Annual Cyclopaedia and Register of Important Events of the Year 1888. 1889.
- "Cheyenne (Wyoming)" . Encyclopædia Britannica. Vol. 6 (11th ed.). 1910. p. 116.
- Federal Writers' Project (1941), Wyoming: a Guide to Its History, Highways and People, American Guide Series, ISBN 9781603540490 – via Google Books
- George Thomas Kurian (1994), "Cheyenne, Wyoming", World Encyclopedia of Cities, vol. 1: North America, Santa Barbara, Calif.: ABC-CLIO, OL 1431653M (fulltext via Open Library)
- "Rocky Mountains: Wyoming: Cheyenne", USA, Let's Go, New York: St. Martin's Press, 1999, OL 24937240M
