= Whipple House =

Whipple House may refer to:

in the United States

(by state then town)

- Whipple House (Kittery, Maine), listed on the National Register of Historic Places in York County, Maine
- John Whipple House, Ipswich, Massachusetts, listed on the NRHP
- A. Whipple House, Uxbridge, Massachusetts, listed on the NRHP
- Whipple House (Ashland, New Hampshire), listed on the NRHP in Grafton County
- Whipple House (Bristol, New Hampshire), listed on the New Hampshire State Register of Historic Places
- Dr. Solomon M. Whipple House, New London, New Hampshire, listed on the NRHP in Merrimack County
- Whipple-Jenckes House, Cumberland, Rhode Island, listed on the NRHP
- Whipple-Cullen House and Barn, Lincoln, Rhode Island, listed on the NRHP
- Whipple-Angell-Bennett House, North Providence, Rhode Island, listed on the NRHP
- Nelson Wheeler Whipple House, Salt Lake City, Utah, listed on the NRHP
- Whipple-Lacey House, Cheyenne, Wyoming, listed on the NRHP in Laramie County
