= Lakeview Historic District =

Lakeview Historic District may refer to:

- Lakeview Historic District (Chicago), a National Register of Historic Places (NHRP) listed district in Illinois
- Lakeview Historic District (Lakeview, North Carolina), an NHRP listed district
- Lakeview Historic District (Cheyenne, Wyoming), an NHRP listed district

== See also ==
- Lakeview Village Historic District, an NHRP listed district in Bridgeport, Connecticut
- South Lakeview Historic District, an NHRP listed district in Orleans Parish, Louisiana
