= Castle on 19th Street =

- U.S. National Register of Historic Places
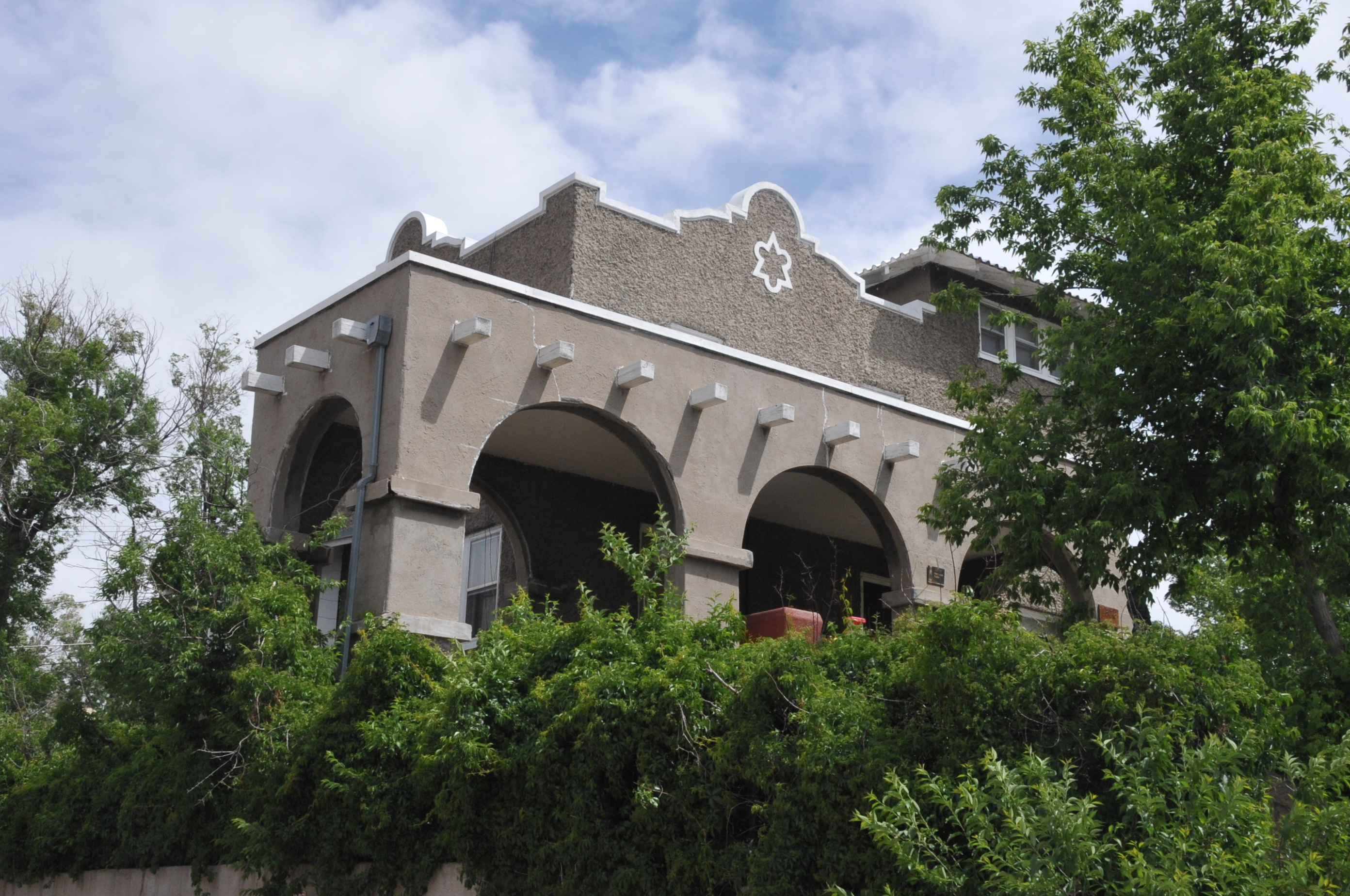
- Castle on 19th Street in 2013

- Location within Wyoming Location within the United States
- Location: 1318 E. 19th St., Cheyenne, Wyoming
- Coordinates: 41°8′29″N 104°48′4″W
- Area: less than one acre
- Built: 1914
- Architectural style: Mission/Spanish Revival
- NRHP reference No.: 79002611
- Added to NRHP: July 10, 1979

The Castle on 19th Street or 19th Street Castle is a Mission Revival style house in Cheyenne, Wyoming. It was built in 1914 for local businessman Thomas Heaney, who operated the Atlas Theatre in Cheyenne. Heaney also operated the Tivoli Bar and Restaurant and became a Wyoming state senator representing Laramie County. Heaney's residence features a three-story corner tower with a broad overhanging tiled and hipped roof, with a stucco parapet surrounding the remainder of the roof, ornamented with projecting crests. A loggia with three arches fronts the house, ornamented with projecting squared beams. The driveway goes through the leftmost arch, flanked by a retaining wall, on its way to the rear of the house. The interior was converted for apartments.

The Castle was placed on the National Register of Historic Places on July 10, 1979.
