= Dereemer Ranch Historic District =

- U.S. National Register of Historic Places
- Location within Wyoming
- Location: East of Horse Creek, Wyoming
- Coordinates: 41°24′49″N 105°07′54″W
- Area: 18 acres (7.3 ha)
- NRHP reference No.: 83004290
- Added to NRHP: November 25, 1983

The Dereemer Ranch Historic District, near Horse Creek, Wyoming, is a 18 acres (7.3 ha) historic district (United States) which was listed on the National Register of Historic Places in 1983. The listing included seven contributing buildings.
