= Diamond Ranch (Chugwater, Wyoming) =

- U.S. National Register of Historic Places
- U.S. Historic district
- Location within Wyoming Location within the United States
- Nearest city: Chugwater, Wyoming
- Coordinates: 41°44′45″N 105°3′15″W
- Area: 3.8 acres (1.5 ha)
- Built: 1878
- Architect: George D. Rainsford
- NRHP reference No.: 84003696
- Added to NRHP: September 28, 1984

The Diamond Ranch was established near Chugwater, Wyoming in 1878 by George Rainsford, a New York native who came west to breed horses. Rainsford, an architect, designed many of the structures at the ranch. Horses bred at the ranch, mainly Morgans and Clydesdales, were widely known and sought after. The ranch was named after Rainsford's Diamond brand, one of the two oldest registered brands in Wyoming. Unlike most brands, which remain with the owner, the Diamond brand has remained with the property. The ranch features extensive barns for breeding and raising horses, as well as a more modest ranch house. In its prime there were formal gardens.

== History ==
Although Rainsford established the ranch in 1878, it was not until 1880-1882 that temporary structures were built, with permanent buildings in 1885. Rainsford did not receive a patent for his lands until 1891, and then for only 160 acres (65 ha). The remainder was public land amounting to about 27,000 acres (11,000 ha), which Rainsford fenced. He was fined and forced to tear the fences down from 1905 to 1907, as an 1885 law prohibited the fencing of public lands. Although there were 3000 horses on the land in 1900, by 1920 they had declined to 200, and Rainsford sold his remaining stock to the U.S. Army and retired. His manager, Paul Raborg, bought the ranch in 1922, breeding polo ponies and raising dairy cattle. A scheme to feed the cattle on sunflower seeds led to the construction of large silos for storage. The plan failed and Raborg left when his marriage dissolved. His former wife's parents took over the ranch, with Maud Raborg's mother Dora Mae Oberman becoming sole owner on the death of her husband in 1937. Dora Mae Oberman expanded the ranch to 64,000 acres (26,000 ha) before she died in 1956.

In 1956 the ranch was sold to neighboring landowners Hugh and Rissa McDonald, who also owned the nearby Ned Foss Ranch. Their holdings amounted to 75,000 acres (30,000 ha) by 1962. The McDonald's rented the Diamond Ranch buildings for use as a Methodist youth camp from the mid-1950s through 1965. The ranch passed from the McDonald's on their deaths in 1966 to their daughter and her husband, Ruth and John Braunschweig. In 1968 the ranch became a dude ranch and camping center associated with Kampgrounds of America. The barns were converted for guest use, with sleeping accommodations in the stud stalls and a dance floor in the main barn.

== Description ==
Rainsford avoided traditional frontier architecture, using materials and forms more typical of eastern U.S. practices. The ranch buildings are substantial stone structures. The main barn, later the dance and dining hall, is an irregular stone structure varying from 1 1/2 to 2 1/2 stories with a mixture of hipped and gabled roofs. The complex encloses a sheltered courtyard with the main part of the barn set back into a hillside. The roofs are steeply pitched, lending the structures a lowered appearance that is characteristic of Rainsford's architecture. The ranch house is an irregularly shaped two-story structure with a variety of design elements. A stone bunkhouse and a stone bath building, formerly a storage building, complete the ensemble.

The Diamond Ranch was placed on the National Register of Historic Places on September 28, 1984. It continues to function as a guest ranch.

== See also ==
- Rainsford Historic District in Cheyenne, with houses designed by Rainsford
