= Rainsford Historic District =

Historic district in Wyoming, United States

- U.S. National Register of Historic Places
- U.S. Historic district
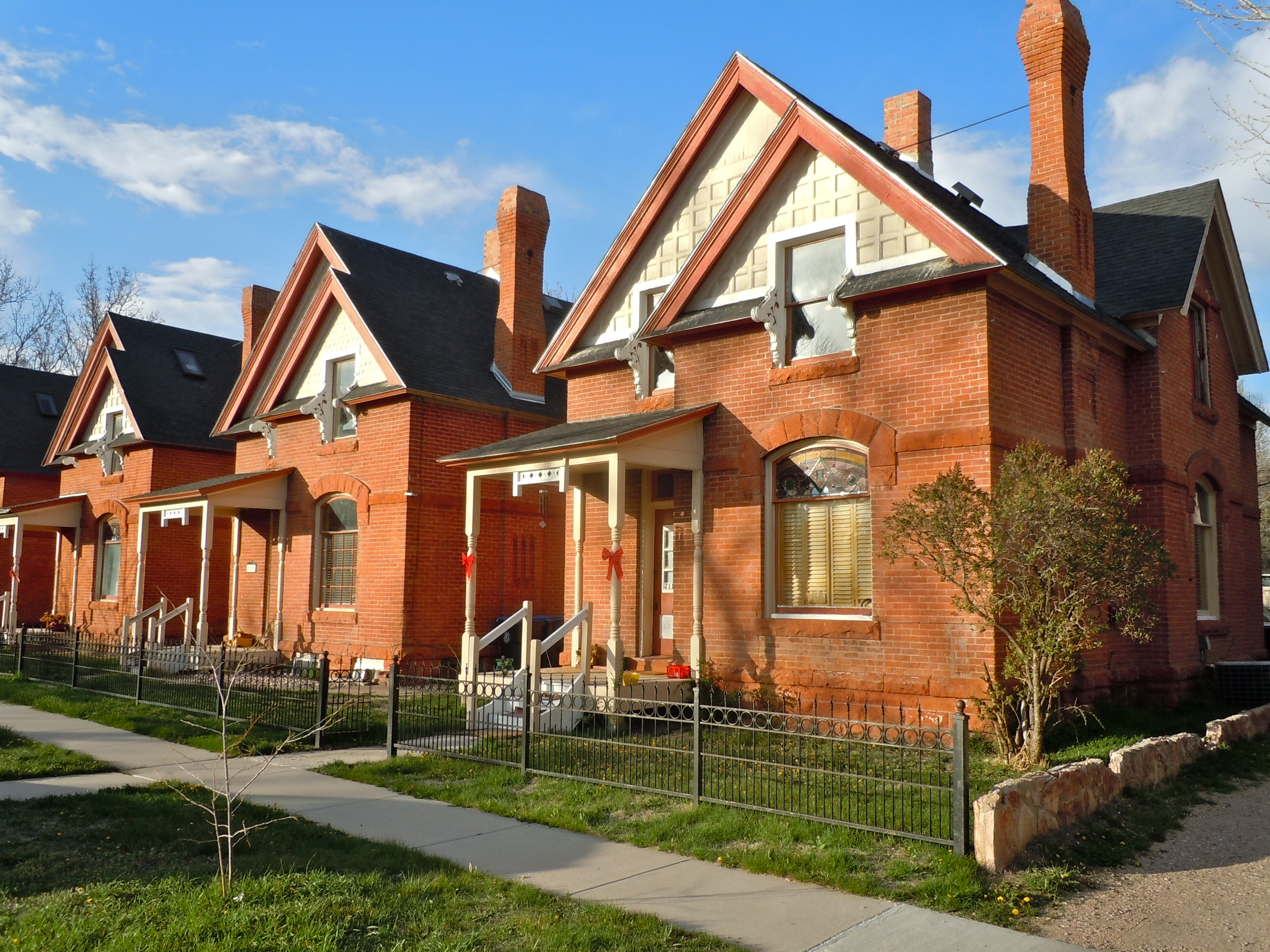

- Location within Wyoming Location within the United States
- Location: Roughly bounded by Morrie, Twenty-second, Warren, and Seventeenth Sts., Cheyenne, Wyoming
- Coordinates: 41°8′21″N 104°48′26″W
- Area: 198 acres (80 ha)
- Built: 1885
- Architect: Rainsford, George D.; et al.
- Architectural style: Late Victorian
- NRHP reference No.: 84003884
- Added to NRHP: November 6, 1984

The Rainsford Historic District in Cheyenne, Wyoming comprises a group of Victorian houses, many designed by architect George D. Rainsford. The neighborhood includes the residences of a number of cattle barons, giving rise to the name "Cattle Baron Row." The district is located immediately to the east of downtown Cheyenne and includes examples of Stick, Eastlake, Greek Revival, Romanesque Revival and Shingle style architecture, among other eclectic styles of the time. The neighborhood includes the former Wyoming Governor's Mansion and the William Sturgis House, both individually listed on the National Register of Historic Places.

George D. Rainsford was a New York architect who arrived in Cheyenne in the late 1870s, established a horse-breeding operation and gaining a high reputation for the quality of his stock. Rainsford continued to practice architecture as a hobby and as a favor to his cattle-ranching friends.

The district was placed on the National Register of Historic Places on November 6, 1984.

== See also ==
- Diamond Ranch (Chugwater, Wyoming), Rainsford's horse-breeding ranch, also listed on the National Register of Historic Places
