= Van Tassell Carriage Barn =

- U.S. National Register of Historic Places
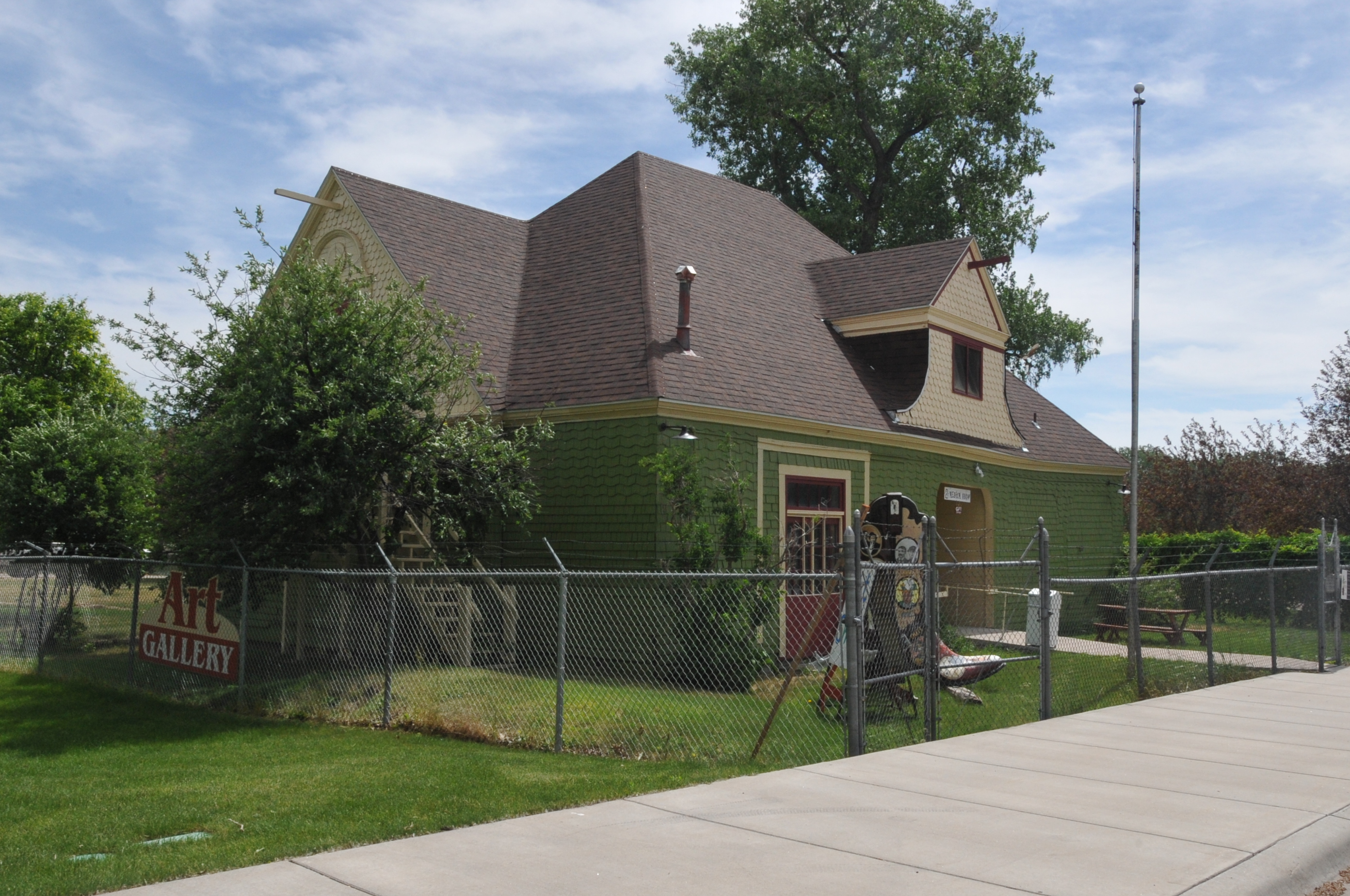

- Location within Wyoming
- Location: 1010 E. 16th St., Cheyenne, Wyoming
- Coordinates: 41°08′17″N 104°48′11″W
- Area: less than one acre
- Built: 1886
- Architect: George D. Rainsford; Bates, William
- Architectural style: Queen Anne
- NRHP reference No.: 78002829
- Added to NRHP: September 13, 1978

The Van Tassell Carriage Barn, at 1010 E. 16th St. in Cheyenne, Wyoming, was built in 1886. It was listed on the National Register of Historic Places in 1978.

It was built as a carriage barn in Queen Anne style.

In 1977 it was serving as the Cheyenne Art Center.

It was designed by architect George D. Rainsford and was also a work of William Bates.
