= Texas Oil Company (Cheyenne, Wyoming) =

- U.S. National Register of Historic Places
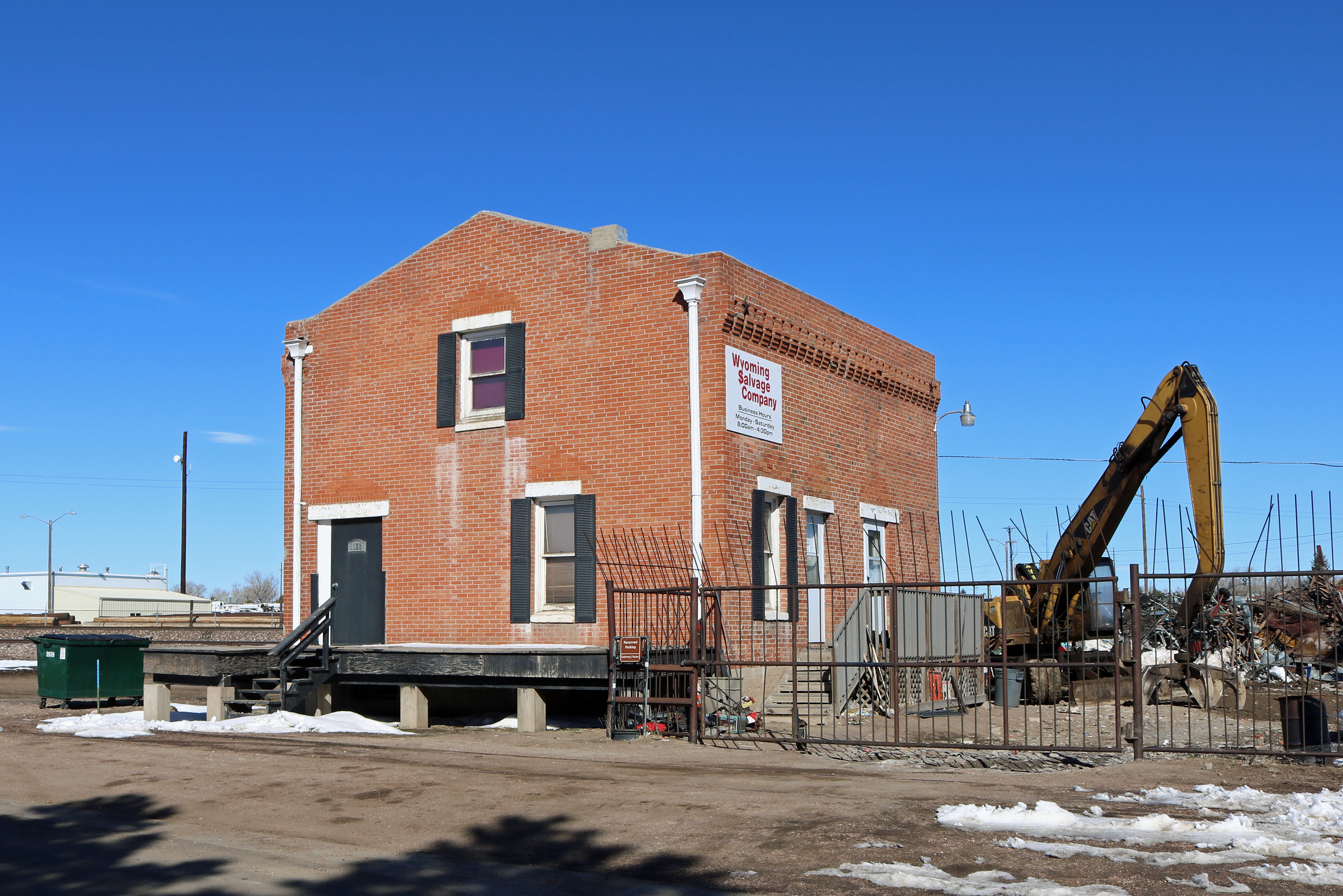

- Location within Wyoming
- Location: 1122 W. 23rd St., Cheyenne, Wyoming
- Coordinates: 41°08′06″N 104°49′46″W
- Area: less than one acre
- Built: 1915
- Architectural style: Early Commercial
- MPS: Industrial Facilities Served by Railroad in Cheyenne, Wyoming MPS
- NRHP reference No.: 03001025
- Added to NRHP: October 13, 2003

The Texas Oil Company in Cheyenne, Wyoming was built in 1915. It was listed on the National Register of Historic Places in 2003. The listing included two contributing buildings.
