= Whipple–Lacey House =

- Whipple-Lacey House
- U.S. National Register of Historic Places
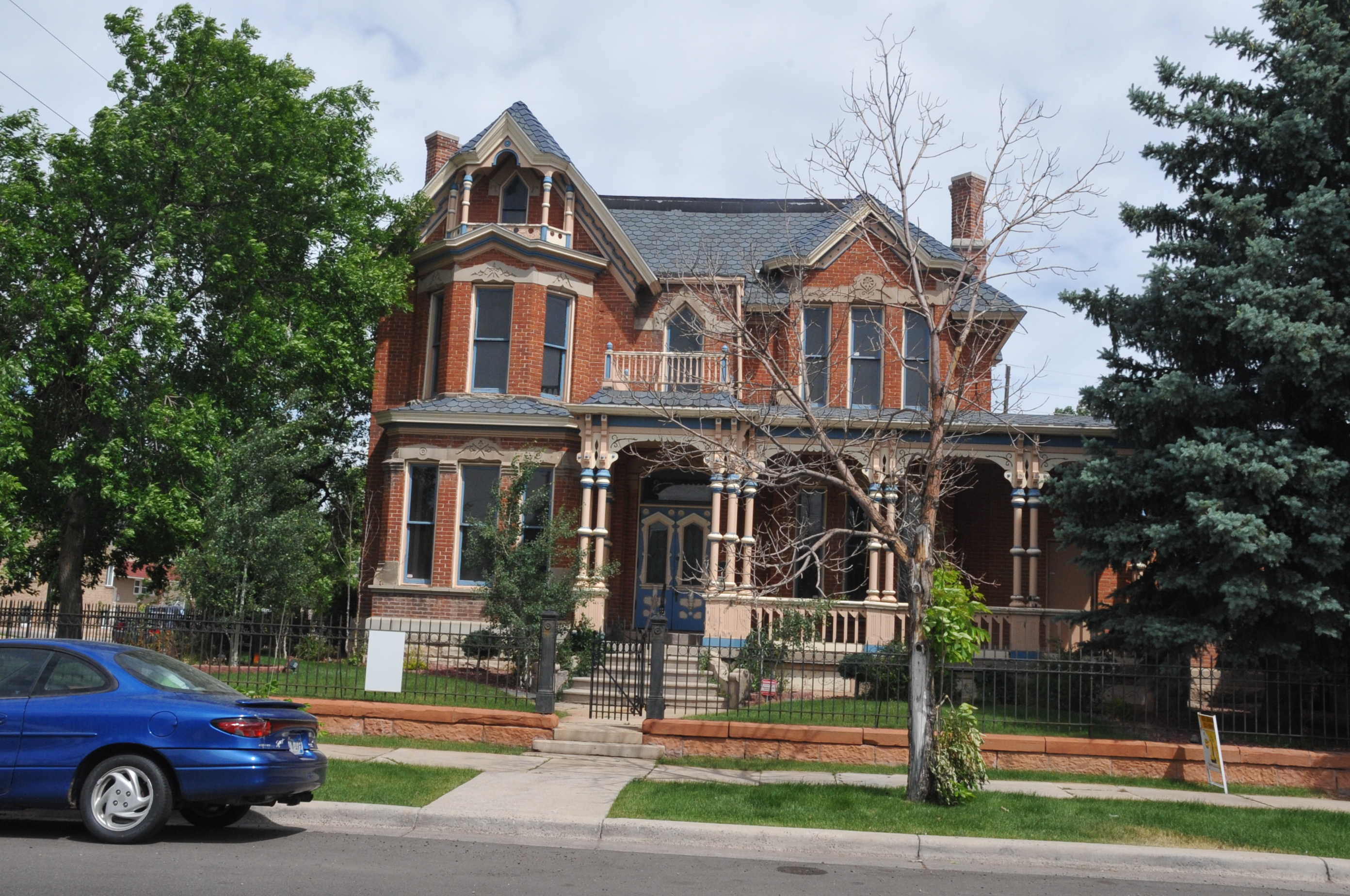

- Location within Wyoming
- Location: 300 E. 17th St., Cheyenne, Wyoming
- Coordinates: 41°08′06″N 104°48′43″W
- Area: less than one acre
- Built: 1883
- Architectural style: Stick/eastlake
- NRHP reference No.: 80004050
- Added to NRHP: May 15, 1980

The Whipple–Lacey House, at 300 E. 17th St. in Cheyenne, Wyoming, United States, was built in 1883. It was listed on the National Register of Historic Places in 1980.

It includes elements of Stick/Eastlake style.

It was built by I.C. Whipple, an early Cheyenne banker, entrepreneur, and stockman. It was subsequently the home of Judge John W. Lacey, and in 1980, it was the A.H.E.P.A. Lodge No. 211, a lodge of the American Hellenic Educational Progressive Association.
