= Baxter Ranch Headquarters Buildings =

- U.S. National Register of Historic Places
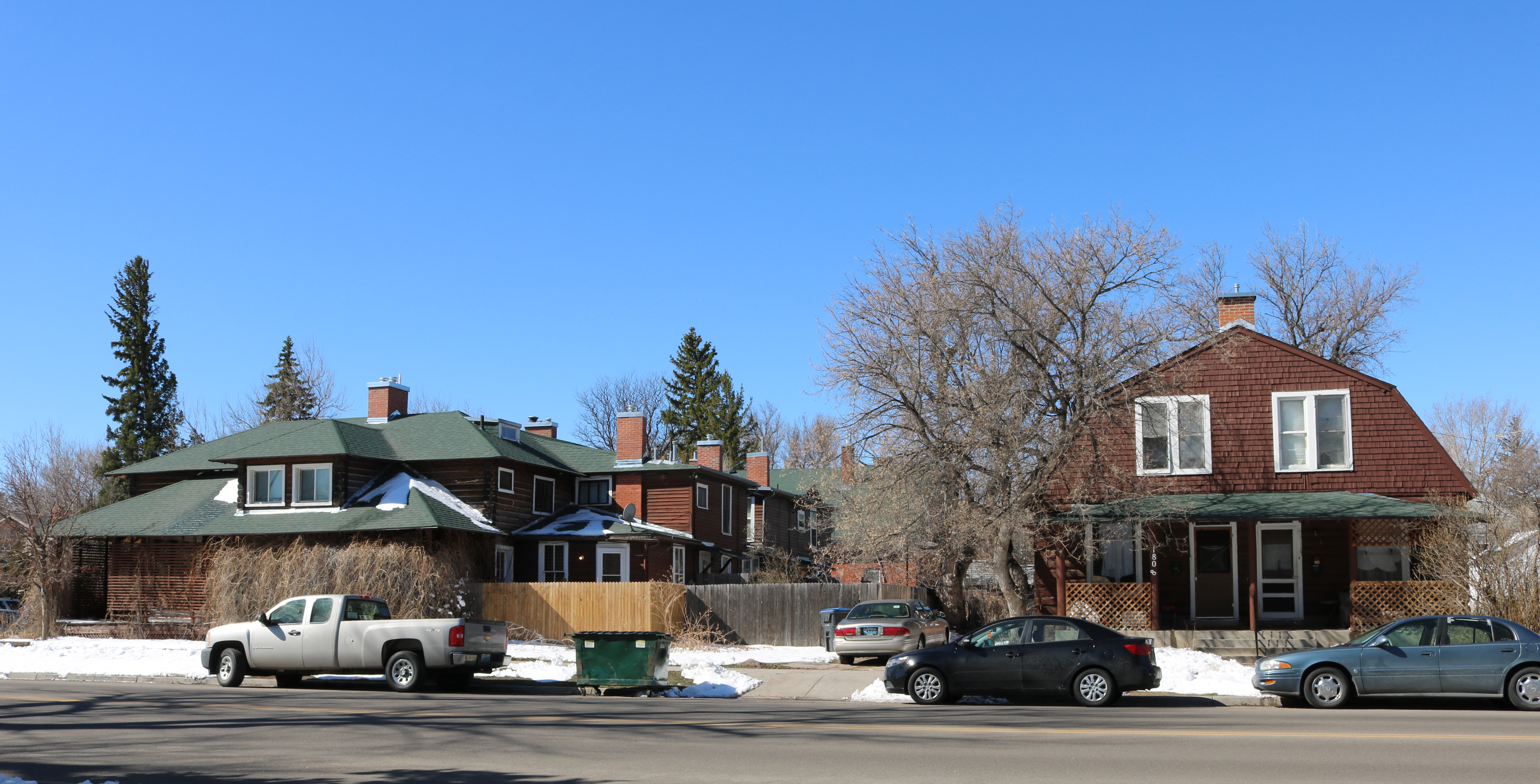

- Location within Wyoming Location within the United States
- Location: 912--122 E. 18th St. and 1810--1920 Morrie Ave., Cheyenne, Wyoming
- Coordinates: 41°8′20″N 104°48′19″W
- Area: less than one acre
- Built: 1885
- Architectural style: Palatial rustic
- NRHP reference No.: 79002610
- Added to NRHP: June 14, 1979

The Baxter Ranch Headquarters Buildings, at 912-922 E. 18th St. and 1810-1920 Morrie Avenue in Cheyenne, Wyoming, were listed on the National Register of Historic Places in 1979.

According to the NRHP nomination:

The cabin and barn were once part of the George W. Baxter Ranch headquarters which was located in the Hillsdale area about twenty miles east of Cheyenne. The two structures, built about 1885, were moved to Cheyenne approximately in 1904, and the log cabin was converted into a two-story, four-unit apartment building while the log barn became a two-story duplex. To move the structures was a major undertaking. They were dismantled log by log, and each log was numbered and replaced in its exact, original position. Spaces between the logs were packed with oakum, and the logs and oakum remain in excellent condition. Sewer and water lines were installed in 1904, sidewalks were finished in 1910, and paving on Eighteenth Street was apparently completed by 1924. The log cabin, described in local newspaper articles as a "palatial rustic mansion" represents a very late example of rustic architecture and construction. Moreover, the structure reflects some French Colonial influence, a style which came to the Mississippi Valley from Canada and the West Indies. High-hipped roofs with projecting gables are characteristic of the style, as well as the surrounding galleries, or piazzas, which were hot-climate additions. Dimensions of the cabin, including 1904 clapboard additions containing kitchens, baths and extra bedrooms, are approximately 81 feet by 58 feet. The logs used in its construction, each nine inches in diameter, were laid in alternating tiers and carefully cut and fitted into lock-notch cornerings. Faint traces of paint indicate that at one time the logs, shipped from the Pacific Coast by the Baxters, were brown in color.
