= Cheyenne Little Theatre Players =

Not-for-profit theatre company in Wyoming, US

The Cheyenne Little Theatre Players (CLTP) is a not-for-profit theatre company in Cheyenne, Wyoming. Founded in 1930, it is one of the oldest community theatre groups in the United States.

The company performs at two locations in Cheyenne: the Mary Godfrey Playhouse at 2706 E Pershing Blvd, and the historic Atlas Theatre located at 211 West Lincolnway and acquired by CLTP in 1971). In 1940 the CLTP received a 501(c)(3) designation.
