= Crow Creek-Cole Ranch Headquarters Historic District =

- U.S. National Register of Historic Places
- U.S. Historic district
- Location within Wyoming Location within the United States
- Location: 1065 Happy Jack Rd., near Cheyenne, Wyoming
- Coordinates: 41°10′17″N 105°05′15″W
- Area: 49 acres (20 ha)
- Built: 1879
- Architectural style: western ranch
- NRHP reference No.: 09000565
- Added to NRHP: July 14, 2009

The Crow Creek-Cole Ranch Headquarters Historic District, in Laramie County, Wyoming near Cheyenne, dates from 1879. It was listed on the National Register of Historic Places in 2009 as Crow Creek-Cole Ranch Headquarters Historic District

It has also been known as Cole Creek Ranch, as Gilchrist Ranch, and as Cole Ranch. The listing included five contributing buildings, four contributing structures, and three contributing sites on 49 acres (20 ha).

The ranch was "an active cattle-grazing operation from 1879 to 1972."

The Crow Creek/Cole Ranch Headquarters site was funded by a $39,990 Historic Preservation Tax Credit in a project completed in 2011.
