= Ferdinand Lafrentz House =

- U.S. National Register of Historic Places
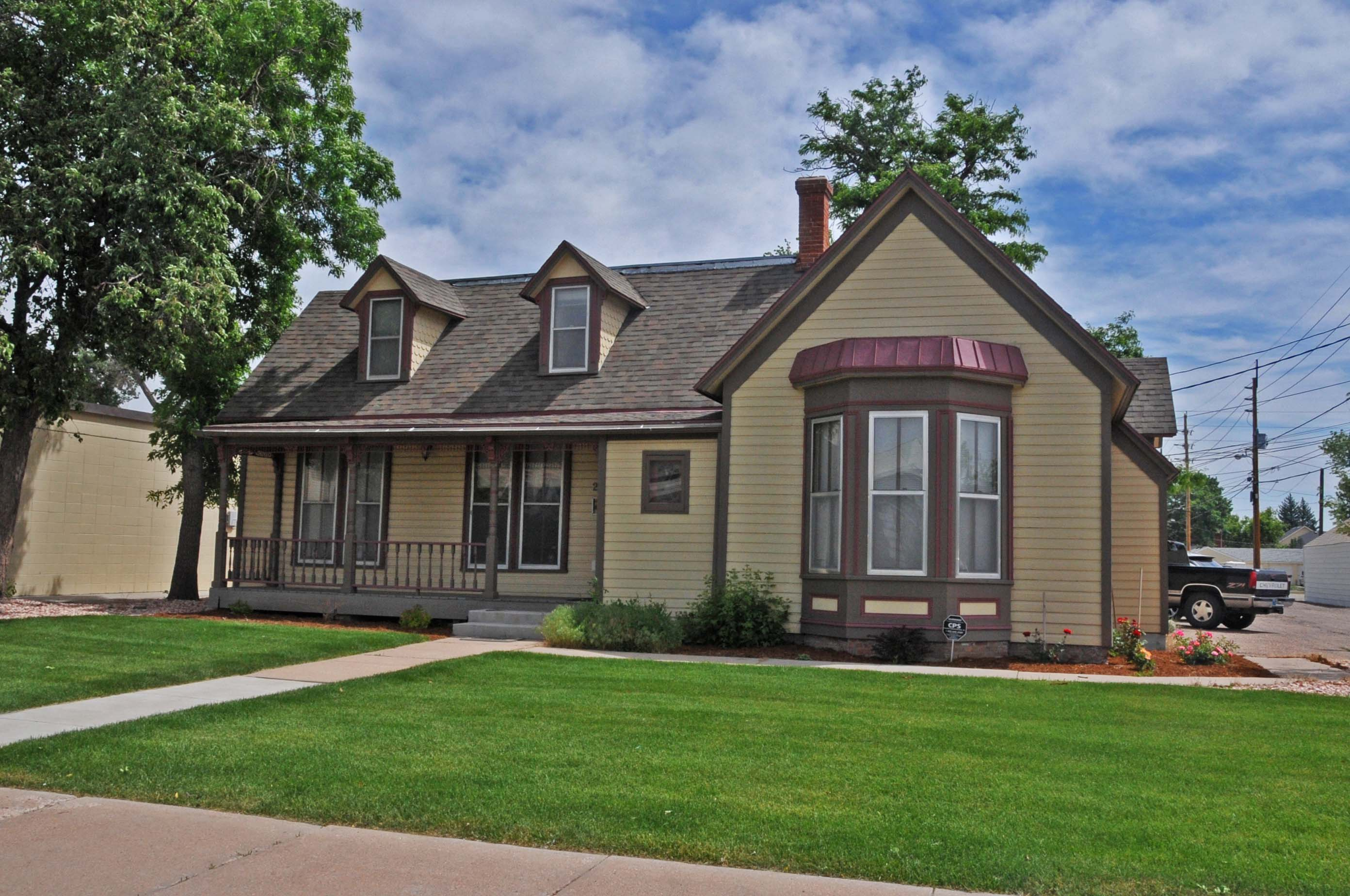

- Location within Wyoming
- Location: 2015 Warren Ave., Cheyenne, Wyoming
- Coordinates: 41°08′15″N 104°48′53″W
- Area: less than one acre
- Built: 1882
- Architectural style: Queen Anne, Eclectic Queen Anne
- NRHP reference No.: 79003679
- Added to NRHP: July 17, 1979

The Ferdinand Lafrentz House, at 2015 Warren Ave. in Cheyenne, Wyoming, was built in 1882. It was listed on the National Register of Historic Places in 1979.

It has elements of Queen Anne style and was deemed "representative of the type of frame cottage that was built in Cheyenne during the last quarter of the nineteenth century."

It is significant in part for its association with three persons of importance:

- Lloyd Fredendall, whose father owned the house, and who became Lieutenant-General in the U.S. Army, notably serving in North Africa in 1942 and becoming a commander of the Second Army in 1943
- Ferdinand W. Lafrentz, who owned the house during the 1884–87
- Robert N. LaFontaine, a Cheyenne contractor.
