= Hebard Public School =

- U.S. National Register of Historic Places
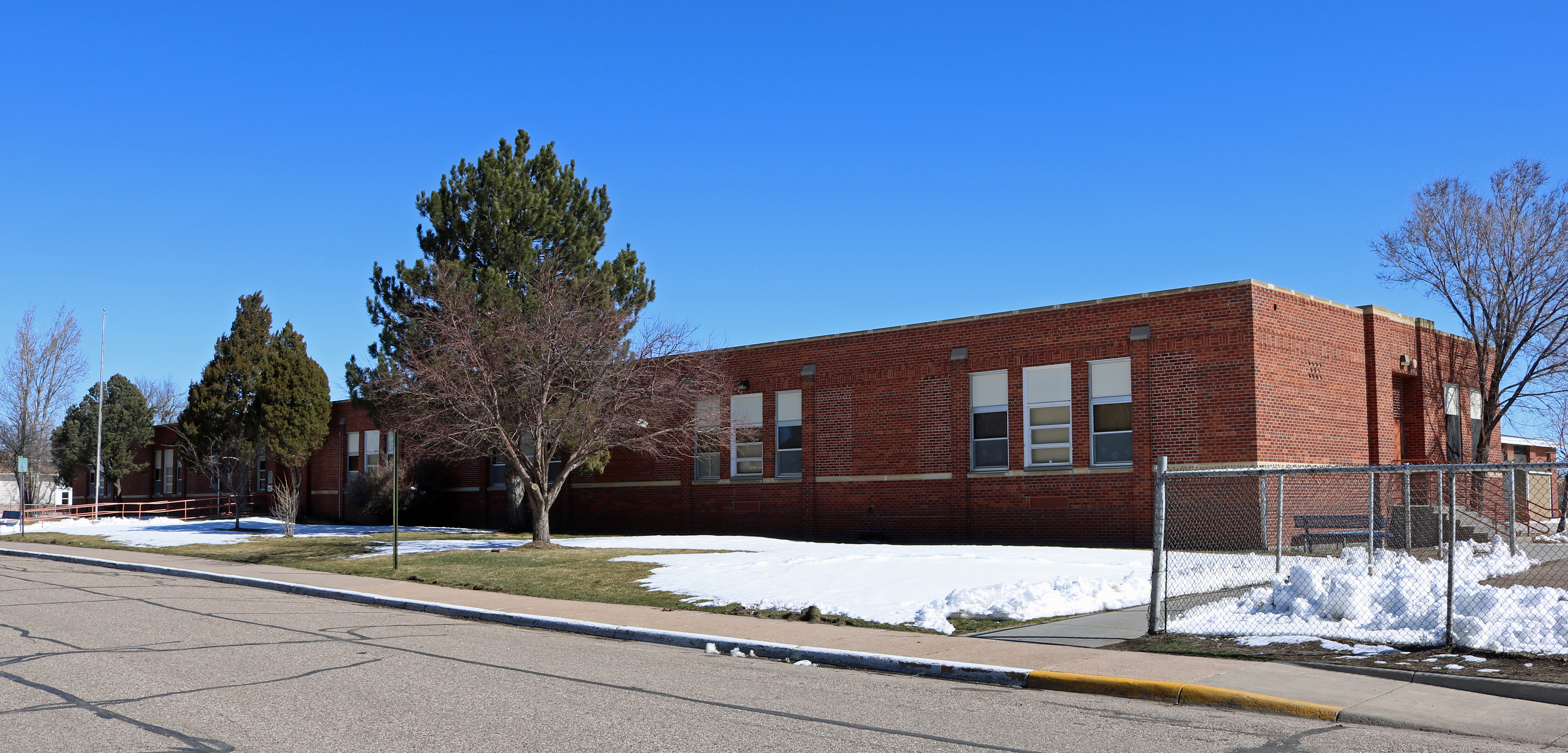

- Location within Wyoming Location within the United States
- Location: 413 Seymour Ave., Cheyenne, Wyoming
- Coordinates: 41°07′32″N 104°47′59″W
- Area: 3.9 acres (1.6 ha)
- Built: 1945
- Built by: Jacob Weber
- Architect: Porter and Bradley
- Architectural style: Modern Movement
- Website: hebard.laramie1.org/en
- MPS: Public Schools in Cheyenne, Wyoming MPS
- NRHP reference No.: 05000705
- Added to NRHP: August 22, 2005

The Hebard Public School, at 413 Seymour Ave. in Cheyenne, Wyoming, was built in 1945. It was listed on the National Register of Historic Places in 2005.

It is built of concrete blocks with brick facing laid in common bond, in Modern Movement style.

It was deemed

eligible to the National Register of Historic Places Under Criterion A for its direct association with the growth of education in Cheyenne. Schools represented the widespread belief in the value of universal education. The formation of school districts and the building of schools reflected how Cheyenne's citizens felt about the permanency of their community and their faith in its future. Hebard School reflects Cheyenne's post-war city expansion on the South Side, a traditional working class neighborhood. This school is also used for public assemblies and civic celebrations, a place for the community to come together. The building is also eligible under Criterion C in the area of architecture as it represents a harbinger of school architecture in the 1950s and 1960s and represents the work of a master architect, Frederick Hutchinson Porter.
