= Lakeview Historic District (Cheyenne, Wyoming) =

Historic district in Wyoming, United States

- U.S. National Register of Historic Places
- U.S. Historic district
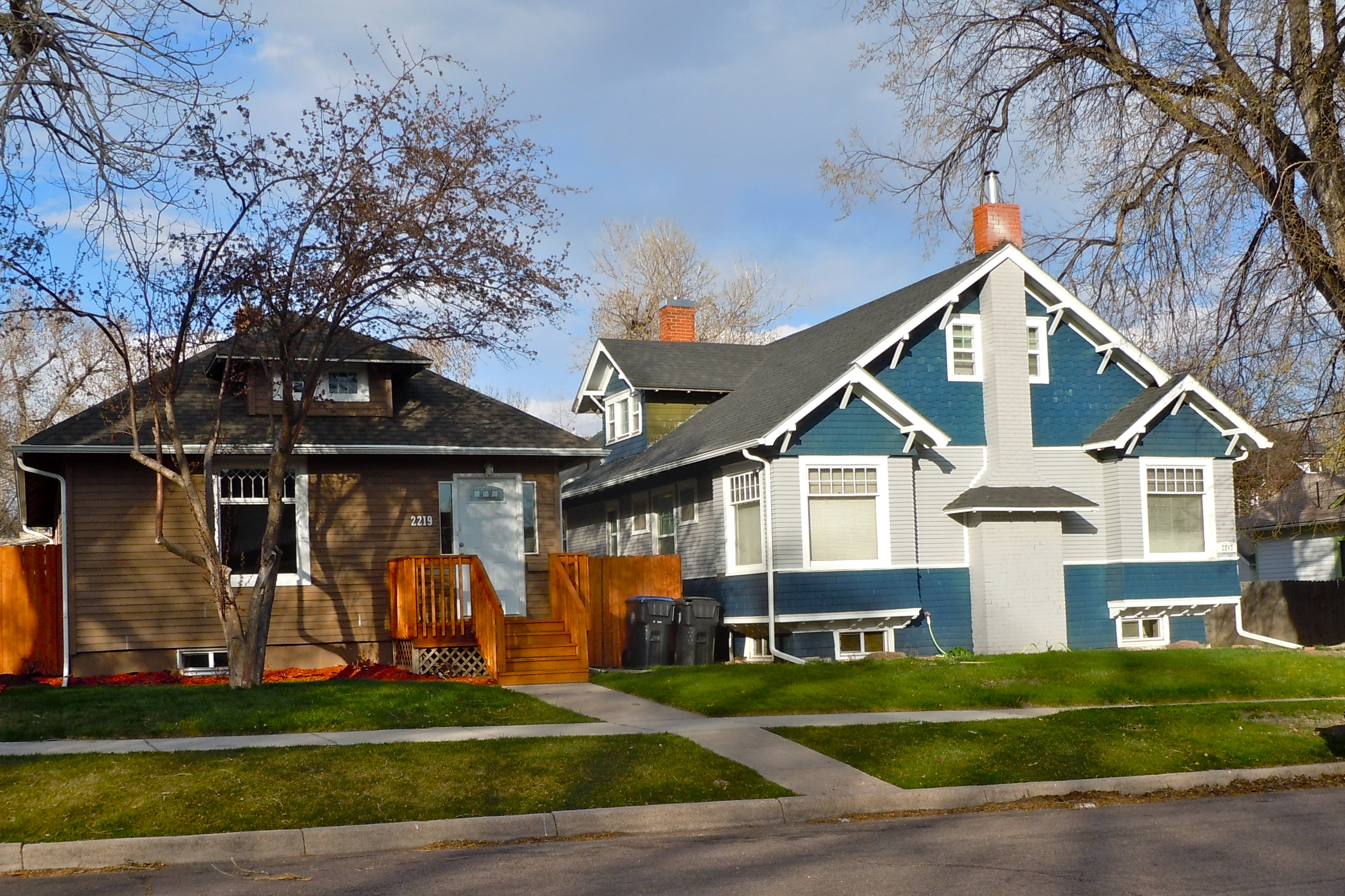

- Location within Wyoming Location within the United States
- Location: Roughly bounded by Twenty-Seventh, Seymour, Maxwell, and Warren, Cheyenne, Wyoming
- Coordinates: 41°8′31″N 104°48′52″W
- NRHP reference No.: 88000560
- Added to NRHP: August 5, 1996

The Lakeview Historic District is a residential historic district in Cheyenne, Wyoming. The neighborhood was one of Cheyenne's original neighborhoods when the city was platted in 1870; most of the homes in the district were built between 1880 and 1930. Most of the neighborhood's residents were working-class, and many of them worked for the Union Pacific Railroad. Before 1900, most homes built in the district had simple Italianate, Queen Anne, or vernacular designs. American Foursquare and bungalow houses became popular in the 20th century as those styles gained prominence nationally.

The district was listed on the National Register of Historic Places on August 5, 1996. It includes the Moreton Frewen House, which is separately listed on the National Register.
