= Nagle–Warren Mansion =

Historic house in Wyoming, United States

- Nagle-Warren Mansion
- U.S. National Register of Historic Places
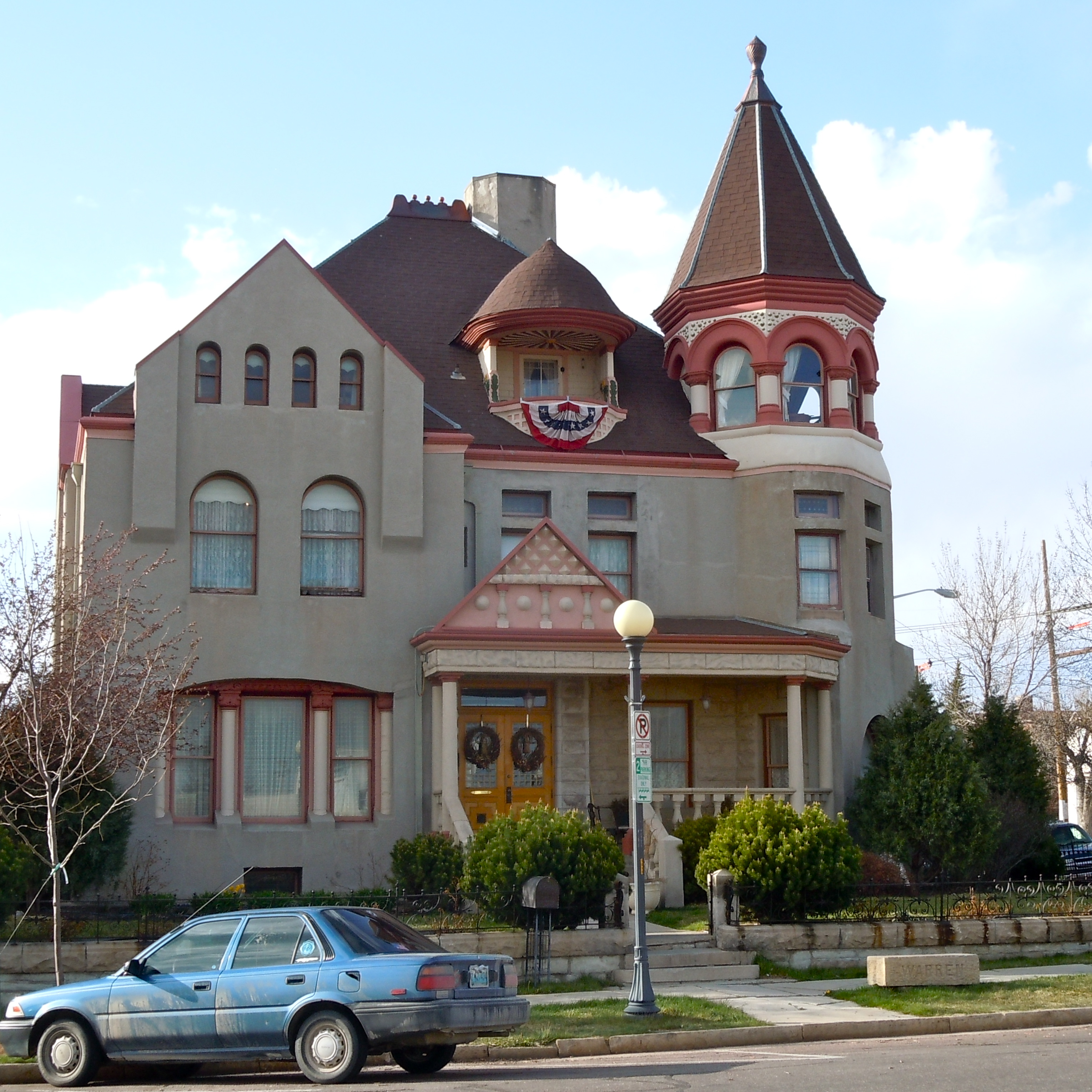
- Nagle Warren Mansion in May 2011

- Location within Wyoming Location within the United States
- Location: 222 E. 17th St., Cheyenne, Wyoming
- Coordinates: 41°08′06″N 104°48′44″W
- Built: 1888
- Architectural style: Romanesque
- NRHP reference No.: 76001955
- Added to NRHP: July 12, 1976

Nagle–Warren Mansion, also known as Cheyenne YWCA Building, is a residence and former YWCA in Cheyenne, Wyoming, United States. The mansion, at 222 East 17th Street, is on the edge of Cheyenne's historic downtown section on Cattle Barons' Row.

The mansion was built as a residence in 1888 by Erasmus Nagle. He died in 1890 and his wife Emma and son George lived there until 1907. Emma Nagle then rented the mansion to General George Randall from 1907 until 1910. U.S. Senator and former Wyoming Governor Francis E. Warren and his second wife, Clara LaBarron Morgan, bought the house in April 1910, and their dining room received such guests as U.S. presidents Theodore Roosevelt and William Howard Taft. The Senator died in 1929, and Clara Warren gave the mansion to the YWCA.

The stone carriage house, originally a stable for four horses, was later used as an automobile garage and during the YWCA years as an entertainment center. The original stone smokehouse also still stands, making a total of three buildings on the property, though the carriage and main houses are now connected. The Nagle–Warren Mansion was added to the National Register of Historic Places on July 12, 1976.

The house and its dependencies compose one of the few residences from the 1800s left standing in Cheyenne. In 1960 the outer stone, which had been predicted back in 1880 to be too soft, began to crumble and the exterior was covered in stucco. Don and Barbara Sullivan bought the property from the YWCA in 1985 and began living there with their children.

Jim Osterfoss bought the mansion in 1997, restored it, and turned it into a bed and breakfast ("B&B") establishment. During its 22 years as a B&B, the Nagle–Warren Mansion offered twelve guest rooms decorated in Victorian West style. One guest room was a suite and each room had its own bath. Six rooms were in the main house and six in the carriage house. There were three conference rooms. Furnishings and decorations were authentic to the period of the American Old West and included furniture; wallpaper; brass, marble, bronze, or gas fireplaces; ornate staircases; cherry, mahogany, and oak woodwork; and stained glass windows, as well as some Moorish tile and a Moroccan chandelier. The B&B had a four-diamond rating from AAA. The Nagle Warren Mansion B&B reopened in 2022 after some renovations done by Innkeeper Jas Barbe. The Nagle Warren offers public tea parties, private tea parties, dinner parties, bridal and baby showers. As well as 2 conference rooms that can booked for private use.

== See also ==
- National Register of Historic Places listings in Laramie County, Wyoming
