= Nelson Wheeler Whipple House =

Historic house in Salt Lake City, Utah, U.S.

- U.S. National Register of Historic Places
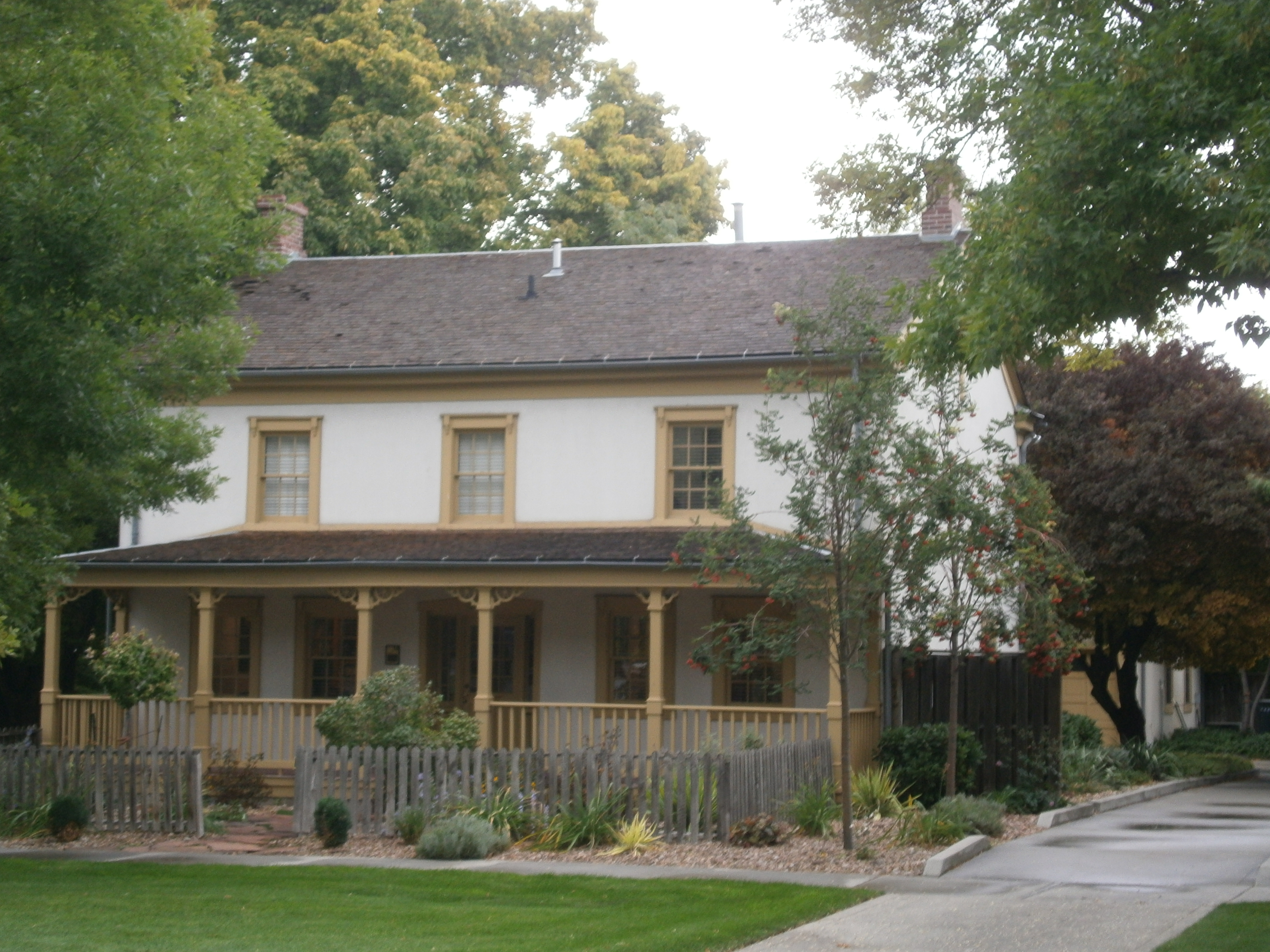
- The Whipple House in 2014
- Coordinates: 40°45′11″N 111°53′58″W
- Area: less than one acre
- Built: 1854
- NRHP reference No.: 79002506
- Added to NRHP: September 26, 1979

The Nelson Wheeler Whipple House is an adobe house in Salt Lake City, Utah, United States, built in 1854. Whipple kept a diary that has become an important historical resource for information on the construction of the house. He bought the lot, situated on parcel 4 of block 134, from Heber C. Kimball for $1.50. Whipple built the house with over a thousand cubic feet of stone, twenty-five thousand adobe bricks 700 board feet of lumber and ten thousand shingles. It cost him $2,000 in 1854, equating to a bit over $7.5 million in 2025's currency.

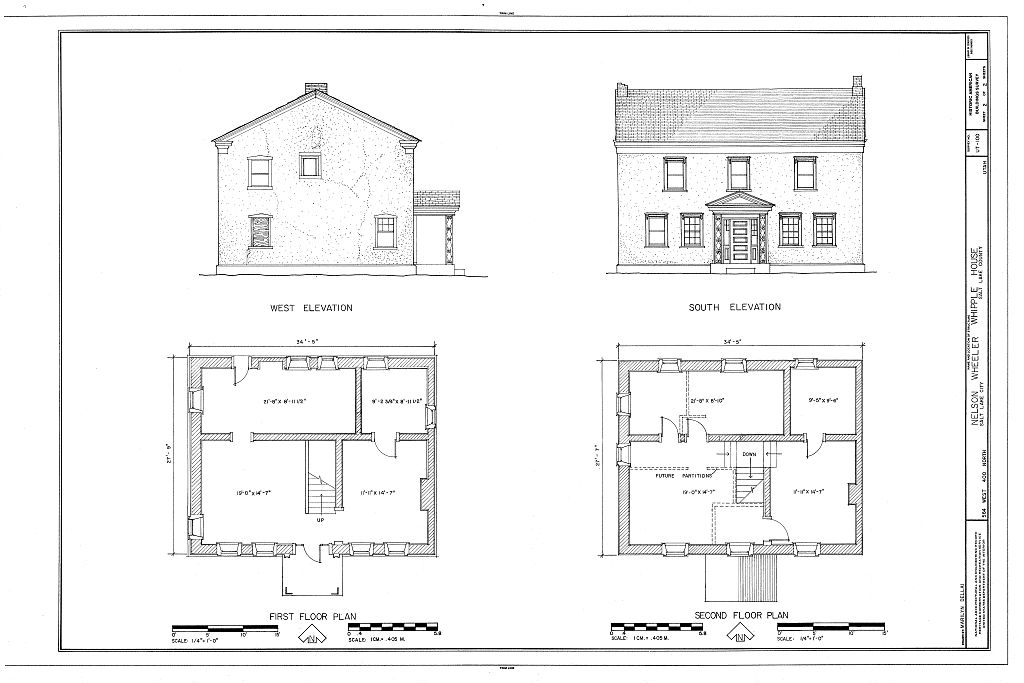
HABS drawing of the Whipple House

The house measures about 28 feet (8.5 m) by 35 feet (11 m). Unlike most homes of this period, which consisted of two rooms, the Whipple home is two stories high and contains eight rooms. Instead of following mainstream architectural trends in the United States this home's designed bowed to the taste of the city's residents and the resources available to them before the coming of the railroad. Its eight rooms on multiple stories place it at the high end of this type of vernacular architecture in this period of relative isolation. It contained two front rooms, a kitchen with buttery, and a small bedroom on the ground floor. The second floor contained four more rooms. The house also had a granary. The exterior adobes are covered with stucco, the entrance was in the Federal style and the roof was a gabled, not hipped. It was placed on the National Register of Historic Places on September 26, 1979. It is notable for being one of the oldest surviving homes in the Salt Lake Valley, having been built in 1854, and demonstrates the preferences and aspirations of the inhabitants at that time. It was renovated in 1992 and has been occupied by Signature Books since 1994.

== See also ==
- The Nelson Wheeler Whipple House before renovation. Note the federal style entrance as it was before it was altered by the current veranda across the building's front. Archived here.
- Photos from the application to place the Whipple House's neighborhood on the National Register of Historic Places. Photo 13 shows the house's facade after renovation. Archived here.
- Media related to Nelson Wheeler Whipple House at Wikimedia Commons
- Historic American Buildings Survey (HABS) No. UT-100, "Nelson Wheeler Whipple House, 564 West 400 North, Salt Lake City, Salt Lake County, UT", 2 measured drawings, 2 data pages
