= Cheyenne Flour Milling Company =

- U.S. National Register of Historic Places
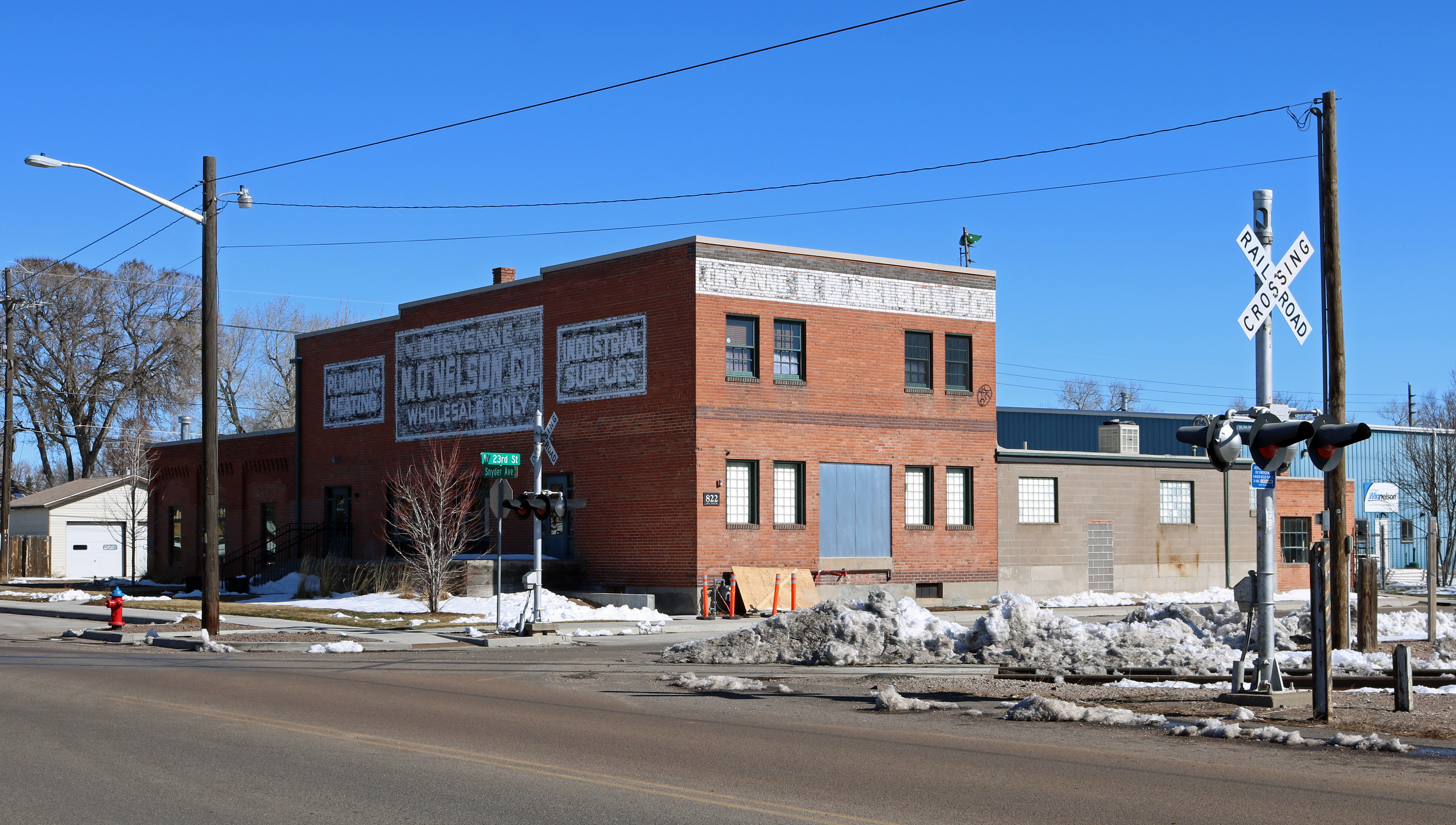
- Property in 2016

- Location within Wyoming
- Location: 810-814 W. 23rd St., Cheyenne, Wyoming
- Coordinates: 41.136500°N 104.826545°W
- Area: less than one acre
- Built: 1915
- Architectural style: Early Commercial
- MPS: Industrial Facilities Served by Railroad in Cheyenne, Wyoming MPS
- NRHP reference No.: 03001024
- Added to NRHP: October 13, 2003

The Cheyenne Flour Milling Company, also known as the Standard Oil Company and Salt Creek Freightways, is an early warehouse building in Cheyenne, Wyoming. The structure was built in 1927 to house goods brought to and from Cheyenne by the Union Pacific Railroad in an industrial section of Cheyenne as a flour mill, replacing structures that had performed similar functions since 1915. By 1931 the building was shared by a warehouse for electrical parts for the Mountain States Telephone and Telegraph Company, a potato chip factory and a chemical products company. In 1937-38 the Standard Oil Company started to use the warehouse for bulk petroleum products storage, continuing to 1963. From 1963 the building was used by Salt Creek Freightways, which had shared use from 1936. In 1973 it became a plumbing parts warehouse, and by 2003 was owned and used by a general contractor.

The oldest section of the L-shaped building is a one-story masonry building, 40 feet (12 m) by 32 feet (9.8 m), with a flat roof. A brick two-story section dates to 1927 and measures 70 feet (21 m) by 32 feet (9.8 m). This section has a stepped parapet. A cone-story concrete block addition was built in 1936, measuring about 36 feet (11 m) by 16 feet (4.9 m). Another brick addition abuts the connector, and appears to have been built as an office. Some of the masonry exhibits fire damage, attributed to its time as a potato chip factory. The facades retain a number of painted signs for the businesses that operated there.

The complex was placed on the National Register of Historic Places in 2003.
