= McDonald Ranch =

Historic house in Wyoming, United States

- U.S. National Register of Historic Places
- U.S. Historic district
- Location within Wyoming Location within the United States
- Nearest city: Chugwater, Wyoming
- Coordinates: 41.654629°N 105.034255°W
- Area: 7.5 acres (3.0 ha)
- Built: 1881
- Built by: Donald McDonald (1881 cabin, 1890 house); Frank McMillan (1927 barns)
- NRHP reference No.: 87000777
- Added to NRHP: May 14, 1987

The McDonald Ranch is a historic ranch complex located 14 miles (23 km) southwest of Chugwater in Laramie County, Wyoming. Donald McDonald, a Scottish immigrant, founded the ranch in 1881. McDonald developed his ranch using his personal savings, which was uncommon in a region where most ranches could draw upon outside capital or inheritances. However, his ranch became one of the most successful in northern Laramie County; by McDonald's death in 1925, the ranch was worth over $180,000 and had acquired portions of three other major ranches.

The ranch complex includes seven buildings, six of which are contributing buildings. The one-room log cabin McDonald built when he established the ranch still stands on the property. In 1890, McDonald built a stone ranch house to accommodate his growing family; the house, the main building on the ranch, is typical of the period and region, as the lack of local or imported timber made stone construction popular. Other contributing buildings on the ranch include two connected stock barns with gambrel roofs, a bunkhouse, a garage, and partially collapsed root cellars.

The ranch was listed on the National Register of Historic Places in 1987.
