= Cheyenne Veterans Administration Hospital Historic District =

Historic district in Wyoming, United States

- U.S. National Register of Historic Places
- U.S. Historic district
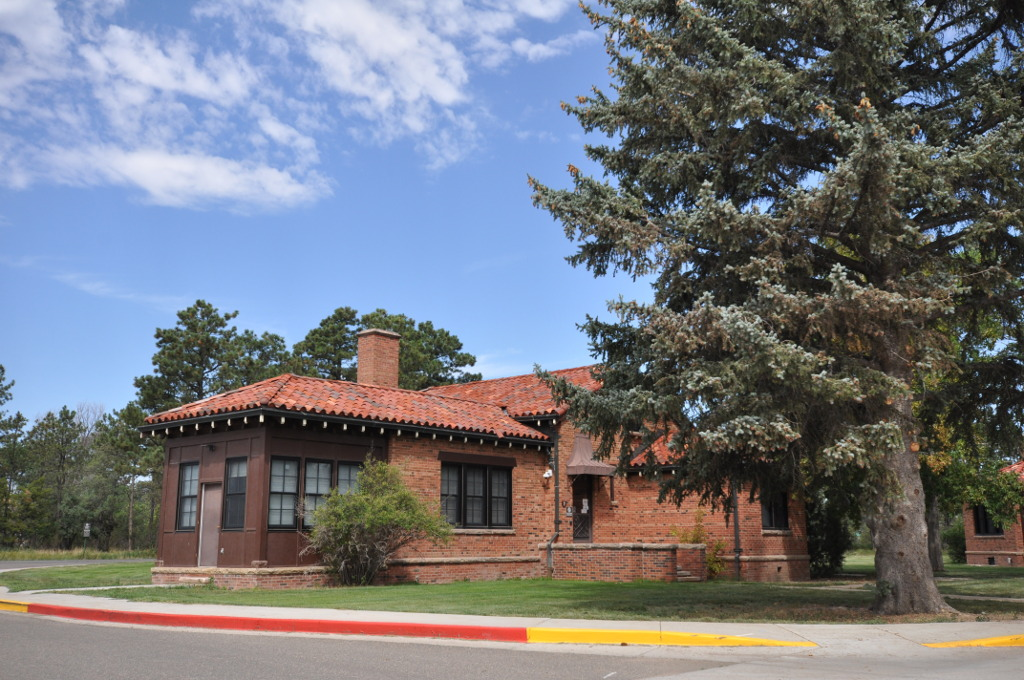

- Location within Wyoming
- Location: 2360 Pershing Blvd., Cheyenne, Wyoming
- Coordinates: 41°08′54″N 104°47′09″W
- Area: 50 acres (20 ha)
- Built by: Construction Services, VA
- Architectural style: Mission/spanish Revival
- MPS: United States Second Generation Veterans Hospitals MPS
- NRHP reference No.: 13000239
- Added to NRHP: May 1, 2013

The Cheyenne Veterans Administration Hospital Historic District, at 2360 Pershing Blvd. in Cheyenne, Wyoming, is a 50 acres (20 ha) historic district which was listed on the National Register of Historic Places in 2013. The listing included 15 contributing buildings, a contributing structure, and a contributing object.

Its main building, built in 1932, at the center of the complex, faces south, and includes Mission Revival and Spanish Colonial Revival styles. It is brick-clad, with tapestry brick laid in five-course American bond, and is topped by roofs clad in Spanish tiles.

It was listed in conformance with a 2011 study of veterans hospitals nationwide.
