= Laramie County Milk Producers Cooperative Association =

- U.S. National Register of Historic Places
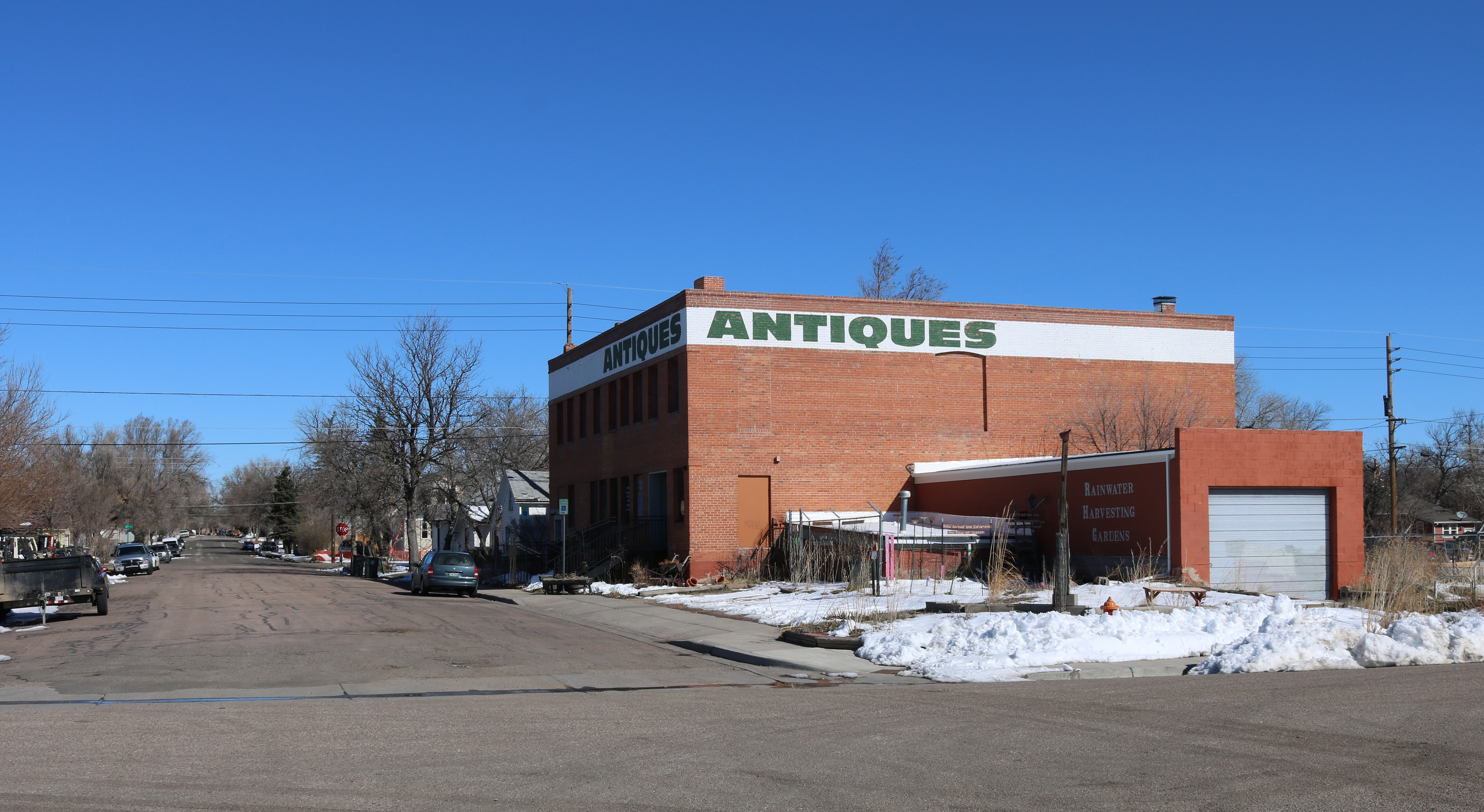

- Location within Wyoming
- Location: 1122 W. 23rd St., Cheyenne, Wyoming
- Coordinates: 41°08′13″N 104°49′31″W
- Area: 0.2 acres (0.081 ha)
- Built: 1923
- Architectural style: 20th Cent. Factory/Warehouse
- MPS: Industrial Facilities Served by Railroad in Cheyenne, Wyoming MPS
- NRHP reference No.: 03001026
- Added to NRHP: October 13, 2003

The Laramie County Milk Producers Cooperative Association, at 1122 W. 23rd St. in Cheyenne, Wyoming, was built in 1923. It was listed on the National Register of Historic Places in 2003.

In 2002 it was the home of "Antiques Central". It is a two-story brick masonry factory/warehouse with a flat roof. It originally consisted of a north half 56 by 32 feet (17.1 m × 9.8 m) in plan and a south half 64 by 33.5 feet (19.5 m × 10.2 m) in plan, built on a raised concrete foundation with a full basement.
