= Boeing/United Airlines Terminal Building, Hangar and Fountain =

- U.S. National Register of Historic Places
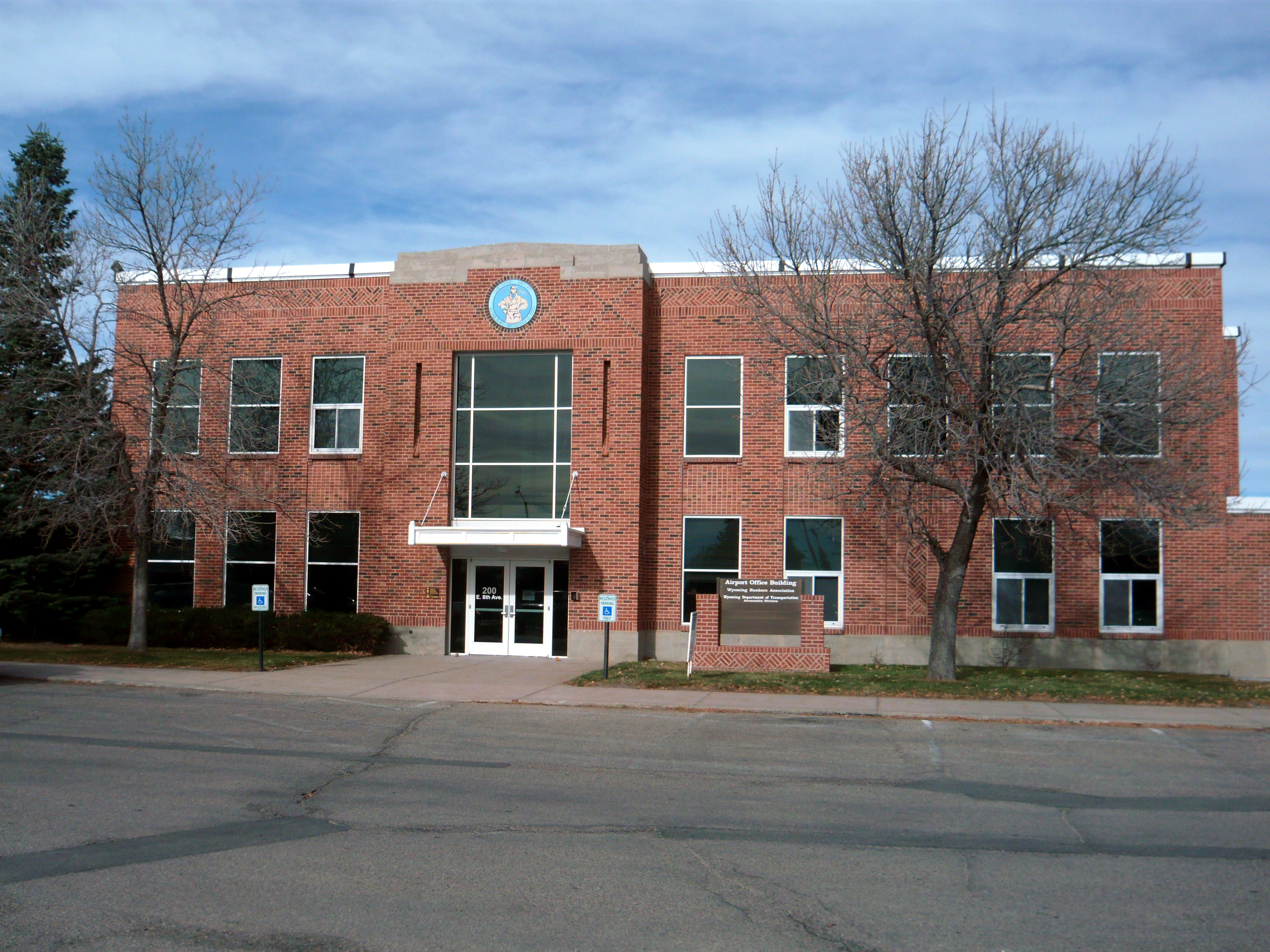
- The former Boeing/United Airlines Terminal Building

- Location within Wyoming Location within the United States
- Location: 200 East 8th Avenue, Cheyenne, Wyoming
- Coordinates: 41°9′13″N 104°49′13″W
- Built: 1929 (terminal); 1930 (hangar); 1934 (fountain)
- Architect: Austin Co. (terminal); Porter, Fredric, Sr. (hangar)
- Architectural style: Art Deco
- NRHP reference No.: 85000249
- Added to NRHP: February 7, 1985

The Boeing United Airlines Terminal, Hangar and Fountain in Cheyenne, Wyoming were built for Boeing Air Transport between 1929 and 1934. The Louis Sullivan-influenced designs form a consistent theme in a time when Cheyenne Municipal Airport was a major air transport facility. The 1930 hangar was designed by Cheyenne architect Frederic Porter, Sr. The 1934 Art Deco fountain was designed as a memorial to early aviation history.

The hangar was designed by Fredric Porter, Sr.

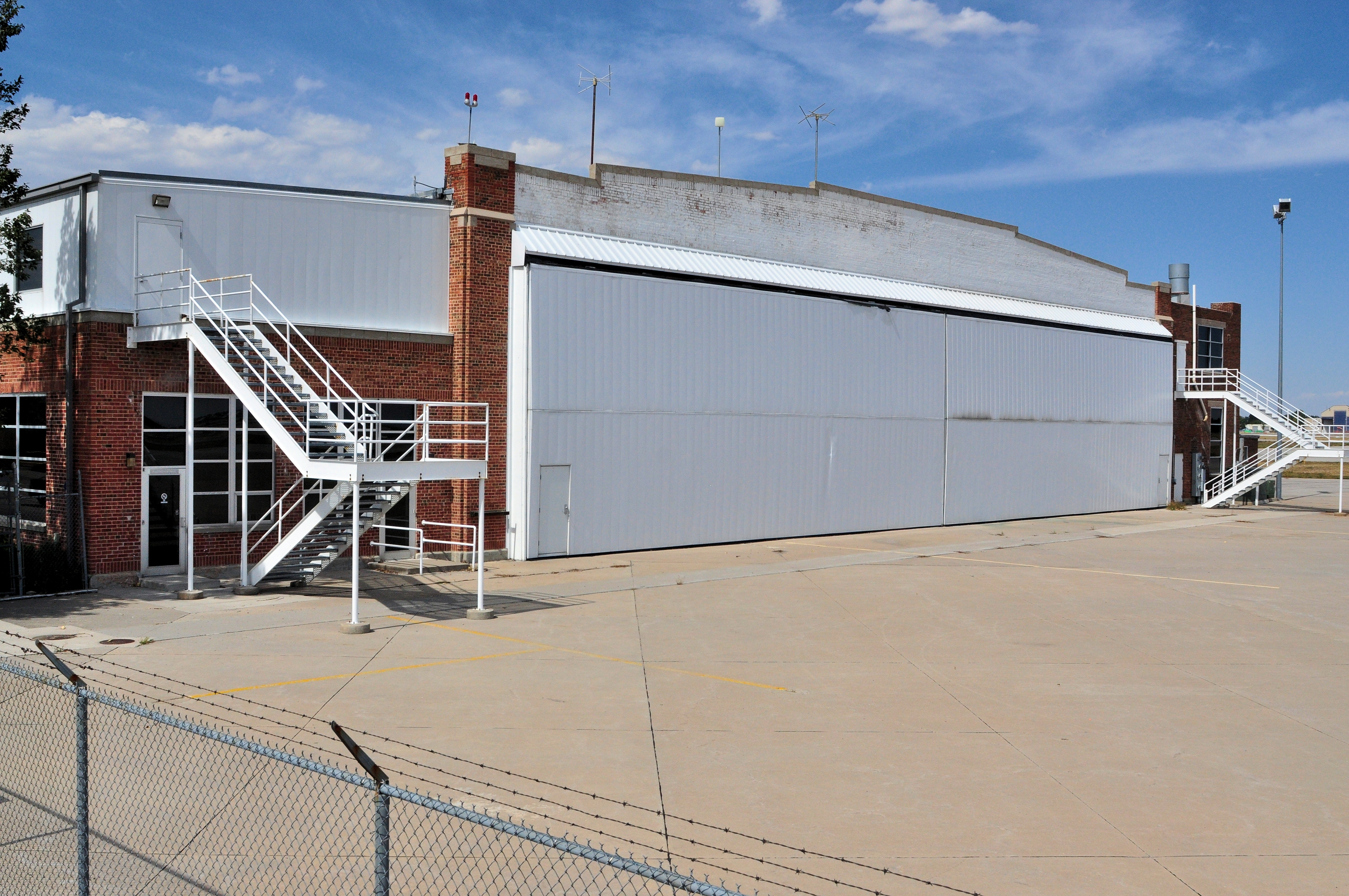
The former Boeing/United Airlines Hangar

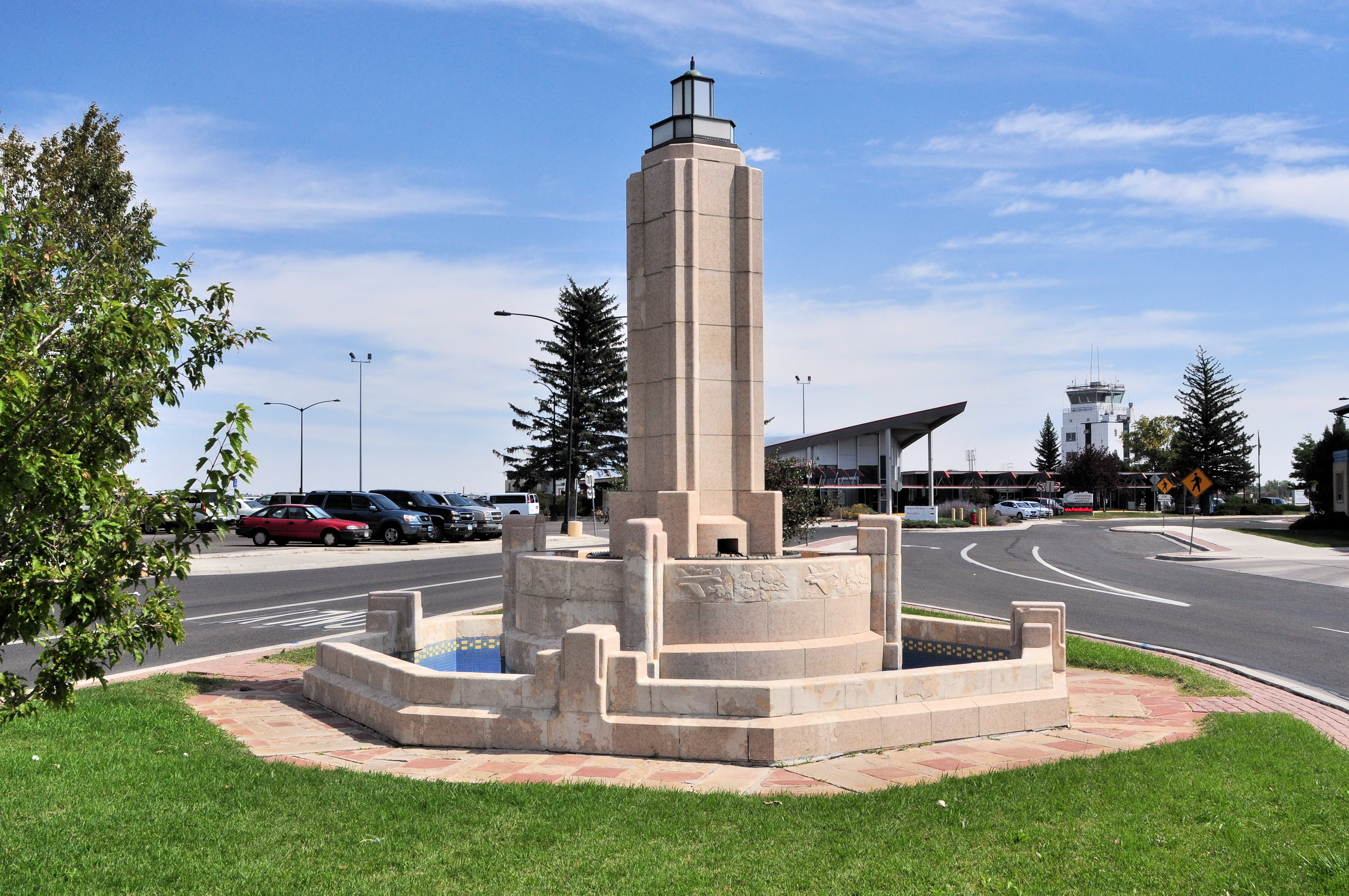
Boeing/United Airlines Fountain

== See also ==
- National Register of Historic Places listings in Laramie County, Wyoming
