= Keefe Row =

Historic houses in Wyoming, United States

- U.S. National Register of Historic Places
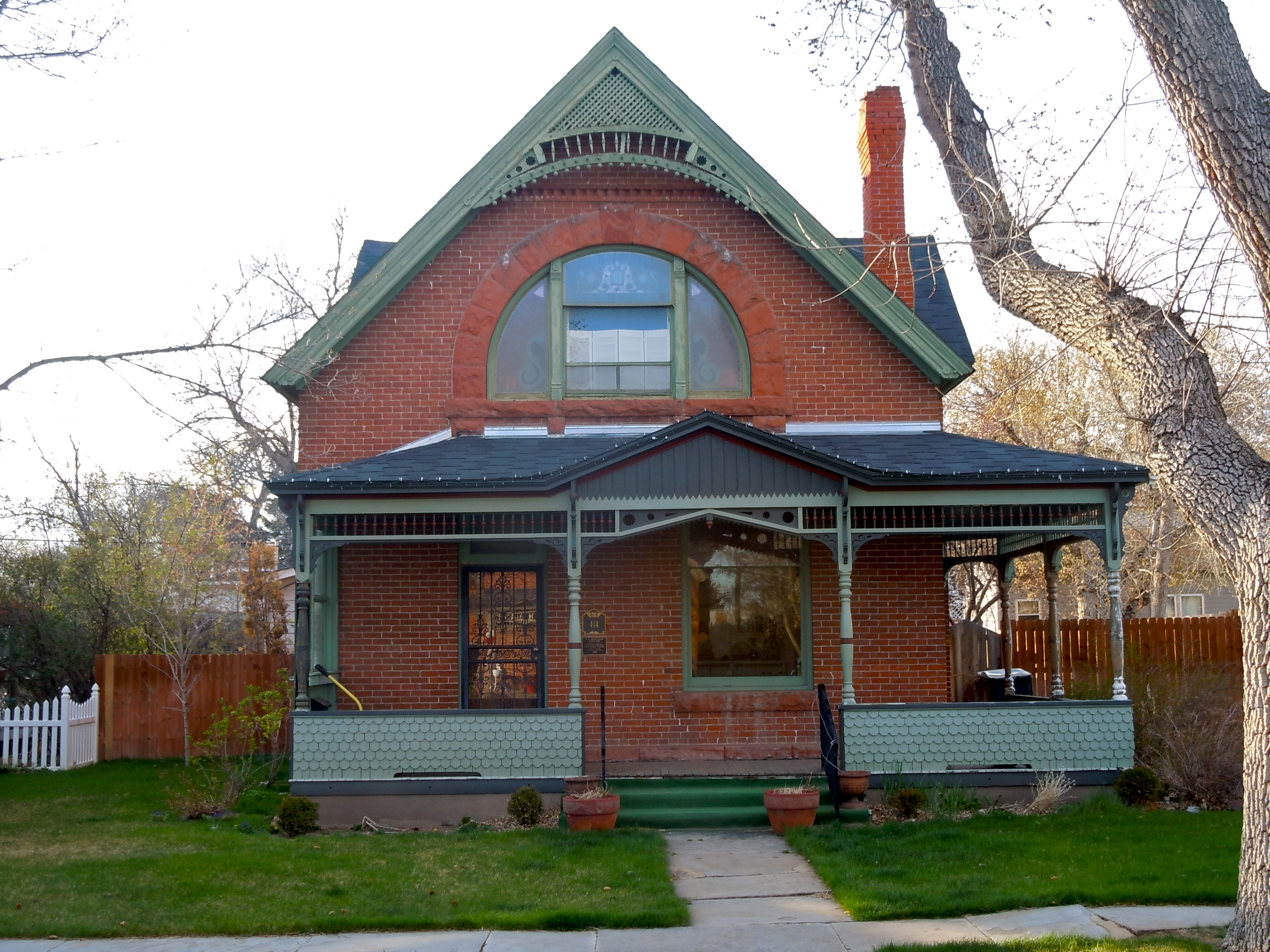

- Location within Wyoming Location within the United States
- Location: E. 22nd St. and Evans Ave, Cheyenne, Wyoming
- Coordinates: 41°08′23″N 104°48′47″W
- Area: 1 acre (0.40 ha)
- Built: 1892
- Architect: Julien, J.P.; Keefe, M.P.
- Architectural style: Romanesque, Richardsonian Cottage
- NRHP reference No.: 79002613
- Added to NRHP: August 3, 1979

Keefe Row is a historic building complex at E. 22nd St. and Evans Ave. in Cheyenne, Wyoming. It was built in 1892 and was listed on the National Register of Historic Places in 1979.

It is a row of nine one-and-a-half-story brick residences. All are built on rusticated sandstone foundations.

They were designed by Cheyenne architect J.P. Julien.
