= Crook House (Cheyenne, Wyoming) =

- U.S. National Register of Historic Places
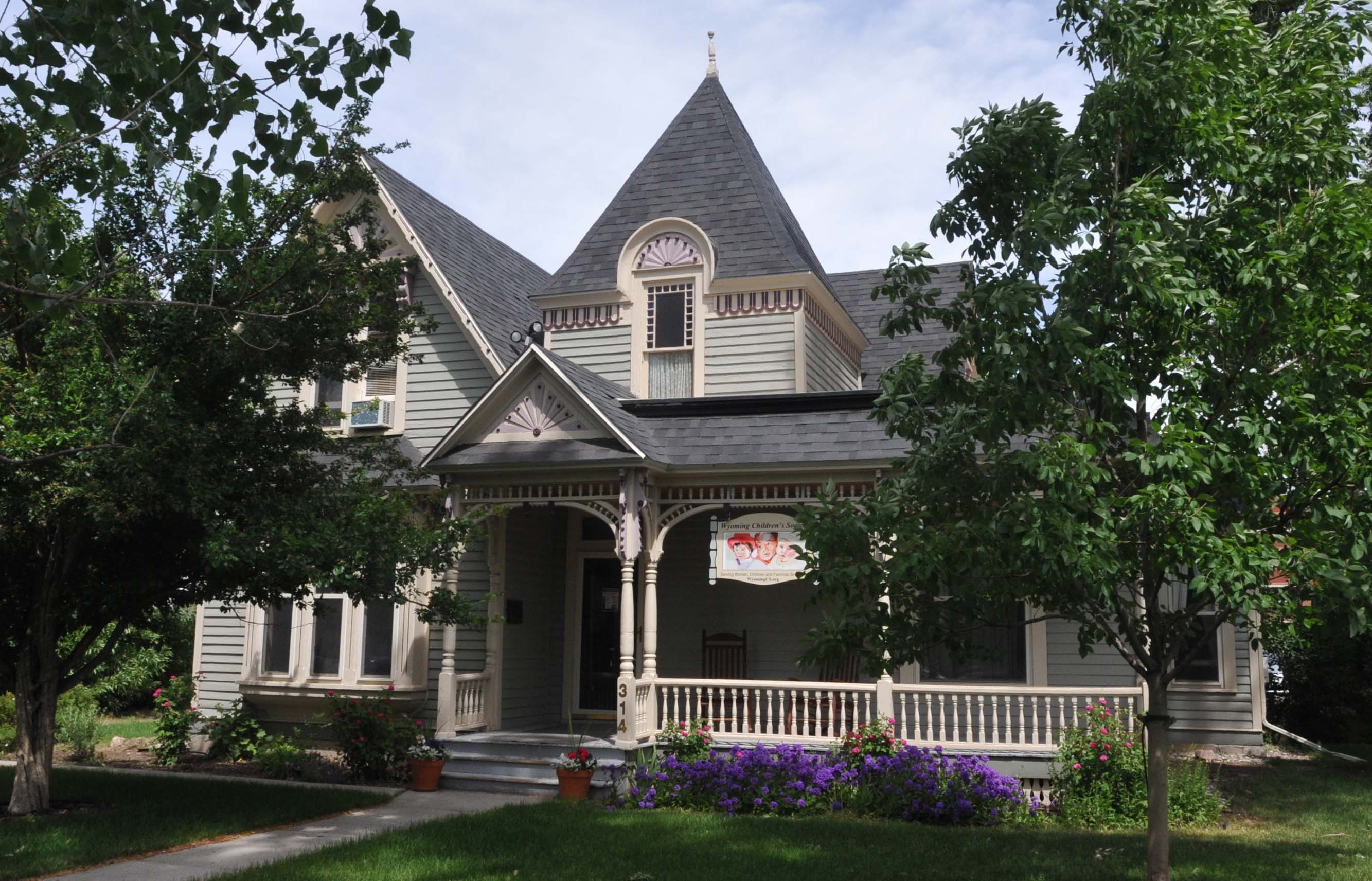

- Location within Wyoming Location within the United States
- Location: 314 E. 21st St., Cheyenne, Wyoming
- Coordinates: 41°8′20″N 104°48′50″W
- Area: less than one acre
- Built: 1890
- Architectural style: Queen Anne
- NRHP reference No.: 79002612
- Added to NRHP: July 10, 1979

The Crook House in Cheyenne, Wyoming, also known as Gibbons House, is a Queen Anne-style house that was built in 1890. It was listed on the National Register of Historic Places in 1979.

It is associated with Dr. William W. Crook, who was one of the first doctors in Cheyenne, arriving in 1875 after practicing in Kansas. The house was for a while the state Governor's Mansion.

Its National Register nomination asserted it is one of few remaining examples of Queen Anne architecture in Wyoming. In this example, the "foremost architectural components are visible at the front elevations and include a projecting, gabled bay, a pedimented, hip-roofed veranda, and a substantial square tower with a pyramidal roof and ornate finial. These main parts are massed in an asymmetrical, but balanced, composition."

The listing included three other contributing buildings: a carriage house (1885) with chutes in place from a grain bin in its second story, a coal storage house, and a former chicken house that is now a covered patio.
