= Atlas Theatre =

- U.S. National Register of Historic Places
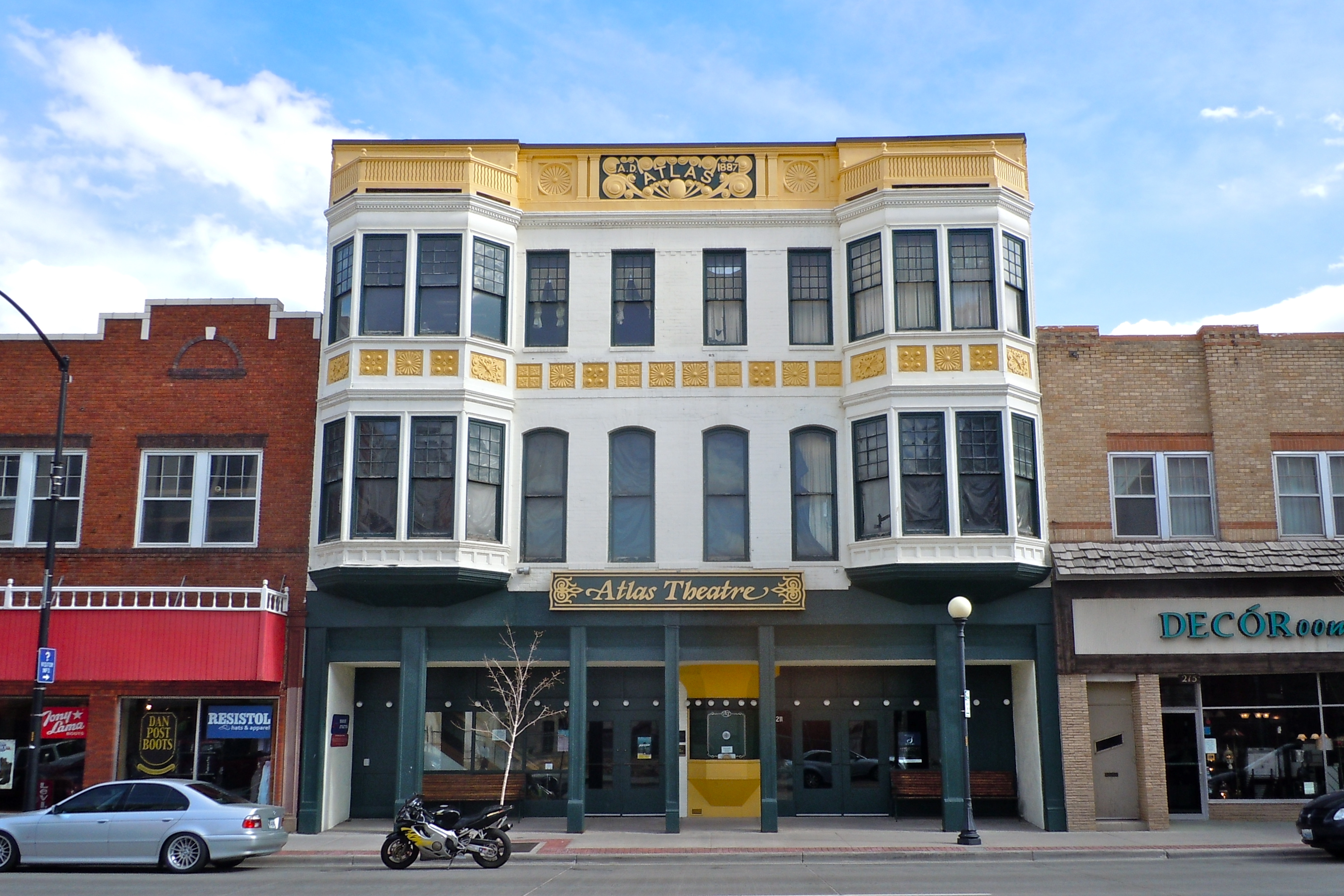

- Location within Wyoming Location within the United States
- Location: 213 W. 16th St., Cheyenne, Wyoming
- Coordinates: 41°7′57″N 104°48′54″W
- Area: less than one acre
- Built: 1887
- Built by: Dubois, William
- NRHP reference No.: 73001933
- Added to NRHP: April 3, 1973

The Atlas Theatre, also known as the Atlas Building, at 213 W. 16th St. in Cheyenne, Wyoming, was dating from 1887 and was built out as a theatre in 1908. It was listed on the National Register of Historic Places in 1973.

It "is located in what has historically been the heart of Cheyenne's downtown business district, " and, at the time of NRHP listing, was "still surrounded by commercial activity".

During 1887 to 1908 the upper floors of the three-story building were used for professional offices and the ground floor was a confectionery shop. The theatre was not the first or most extravagant of theatres in Cheyenne; the Capitol Avenue Theatre, built in 1905 "was probably more impressive than the Atlas. Nevertheless, at that time there apparently was room in Cheyenne for another facility, one which could provide low-cost amusement, and thus the Atlas was built."
