= John W. Lacey =

American judge (1848–1936)

John W. Lacey (October 13, 1848 – February 11, 1936) was chief justice of the Territorial Wyoming Supreme Court from July 5, 1884, to November 8, 1886.

Born in Randolph County, Indiana, Lacey graduated from DePauw University, and then "spent a short time in educational work before entering the legal profession". In 1884, President Chester A. Arthur appointed him chief justice of the Territorial Wyoming Supreme Court. Lacey resigned from the court on November 8, 1886, to practice law in Cheyenne, Wyoming. In 1903, Lacey served as a defense attorney in the murder trial of noted outlaw Tom Horn.

Lacey married Elizabeth Van Devanter, who was the sister of Willis Van Devanter, who also served on the Wyoming Supreme Court and later on the United States Supreme Court. John and Elizabeth Lacey had two sons and a daughter. Lacey died in Cheyenne on February 11, 1936.
