= Moreton Frewen House =

- U.S. National Register of Historic Places
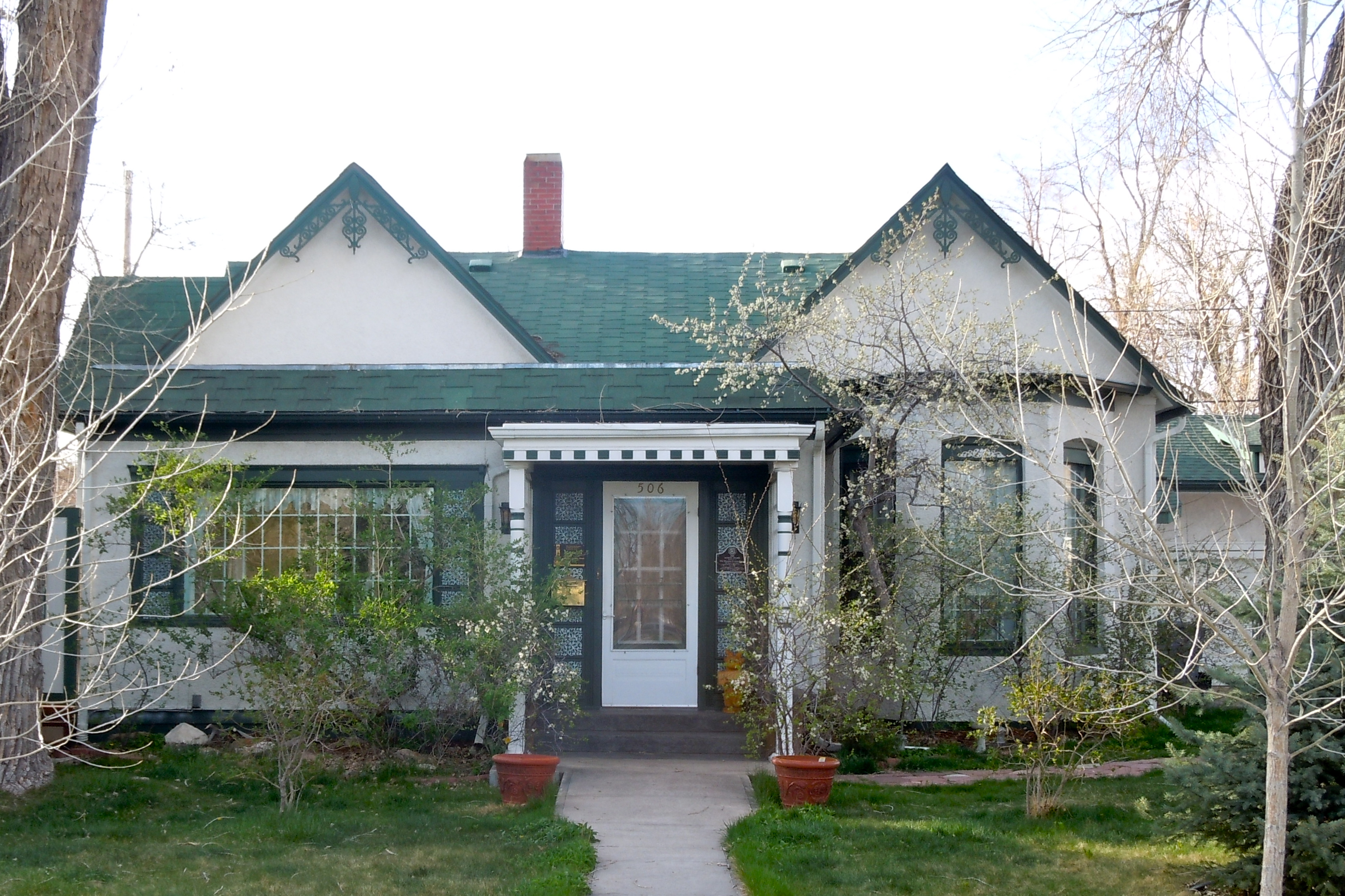

- Location within Wyoming Location within the United States
- Location: 506 E. 23rd Street, Cheyenne, Wyoming
- Coordinates: 41°8′29″N 104°48′46″W
- Area: less than one acre
- Built: 1881
- NRHP reference No.: 75001904
- Added to NRHP: April 14, 1975

The Moreton Frewen House, at 506 E. 23rd Street in Cheyenne, Wyoming, also known as the Everett V. Hall House, was built in 1881. It was listed on the National Register of Historic Places in 1975.

It is significant for its association with stockman Moreton Frewen, and also as a well-preserved historic house.
