= Horse Creek, Wyoming =

- Unincorporated community
- Location within the state of Wyoming Horse Creek (the United States)
- Coordinates: 41°24′54″N 105°10′56″W
- Country: United States
- State: Wyoming
- County: Laramie
- Elevation: 6,506 ft (1,983 m)
- Time zone: UTC-7 (Mountain (MST))
  - Summer (DST): UTC-6 (MDT)
- ZIP codes: 82061
- GNIS feature ID: 1589684

Horse Creek is an unincorporated community in western Laramie County, Wyoming, United States. It lies between Horse Creek to the north, and the South Fork of Horse Creek to the south, along WYO 211 northwest of the city of Cheyenne, the county seat of Laramie County. Its elevation is 6,506 feet (1,983 m). Although Horse Creek is unincorporated, it has its own ZIP code of 82061. It had a post office until the early 2010s, when it closed due to an emergency operational issue. As of the 2010 census, Horse Creek had an estimated population of 39.

Tony and Marian Schepp operated a general store, bar, and automobile garage in Horse Creek from 1948 until 1981. The bar, known as Schepp's Corner, was a gathering place for workers at the nearby Great Western Limestone Mine until it closed in 1978. Candace and David Kirkman of North Carolina bought the entire town in 1989; their purchase was inspired by Candace's childhood dream of moving to Wyoming.

Public education in the community of Horse Creek is provided by Laramie County School District #1.

== Highways ==
- WYO 211 (Horsecreek Road) - north–south route through Horse Creek,

running to Cheyenne to the southeast, and Chugwater to the northeast.

- County Road #228 (Fisher Canyon Rd.), which becomes County Road #17 (Roger Canyon Rd.), runs west from Horse Creek to Laramie.
