= Wyoming Governor's Mansion =

Historic house in Wyoming, United States

- Wyoming Historic Governor's Mansion
- U.S. National Register of Historic Places
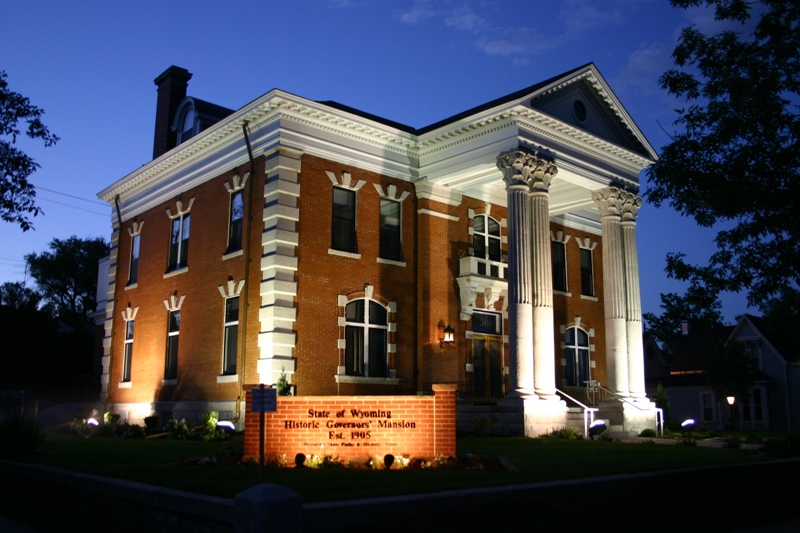
- Wyoming Historic Governor's Mansion illuminated at night

- Location within Wyoming Location within the United States
- Location: 300 E. 21st St., Cheyenne, Wyoming
- Coordinates: 41°8′13″N 104°48′53″W
- Area: less than one acre
- Built: 1904
- Architectural style: Colonial Revival, Georgian Colonial
- NRHP reference No.: 69000192
- Added to NRHP: September 30, 1969

The Wyoming Governor's Mansion is the official residence of the governor of Wyoming. Located in Cheyenne, the current mansion was built in 1976.

The public can tour the residence Monday through Saturday from 9 am to 5 pm and Sunday 1 pm to 5 pm. There is no admission fee.

== Historic Governor's Mansion ==
The previous residence, now known as the Historic Governor's Mansion, served from 1905 to 1976. It is located at 300 E. 21st Street in Cheyenne. The house was listed on the National Register of Historic Places during 1969 as Governor's Mansion.

It is operated by the state as a historic house museum known as the Historic Governors' Mansion State Historic Site. The mansion is open daily during summertime, and from Wednesday through Saturday during the remainder of the year. Rooms have been decorated to represent the 1905, 1937, 1955 and 1960s eras. The Historic Mansion is also a contributing building in the Rainsford Historic District.

The Wyoming Governor's Mansion uses a colonial revival style, with a modest aesthetic and represents a certain level of comfort. The style also incorporates Georgian Colonial aspects throughout the structure. The building is defined by the entrance, with "Four stately, Corinthian sandstone columns hint at the structure’s history of hosting state dinners for dignitaries and other important events".

This is a two-story mansion with historical relevance to Wyoming's history and the notable events that have taken place within its walls. Different ornaments around the structure define the residence, as there are multiple styles being used. The front has a large view of the front door that works with the large columns to create the Colonial style. Inside the building, multiple eras are represented through furniture and wall decor. Some of the furniture is original. "Historic features include many furnishings and decor that are original to the home." The mansion was occupied by multiple families and governors, and with the colonial style there are some temple aspects in the entrance and the stone features that are within first view of a person upon arrival.

A firm did the architecture. "After two days of judging, the five-member jury announced it had selected Entry No. 1, submitted by the firm Kellogg and Kellogg." This signaled the direction they wanted to take Wyoming in on formal architecture within their capital. This design was a primary residence for around seventy years, and has been a celebrated symbol of historical Wyoming architecture. Kellogg and Kellogg are a firm that is still around today. They have worked on multiple projects, but have changed into a business-oriented firm focusing on different business aspects and consulting.

The building is now run by the capital building commission. along with being a dedicated piece of land. "This structure continues to be operated as a state historic site by the State Parks and Cultural Resources Department." This allows preservation of the architecture and history behind this structure. The Wyoming Governor's Mansion is a symbol of Wyoming history and brings to life Wyoming architecture and a style that is prevalent in southern Wyoming.
