= St. Mark's Episcopal Church (Cheyenne, Wyoming) =

Historic church in Wyoming, United States

- U.S. National Register of Historic Places
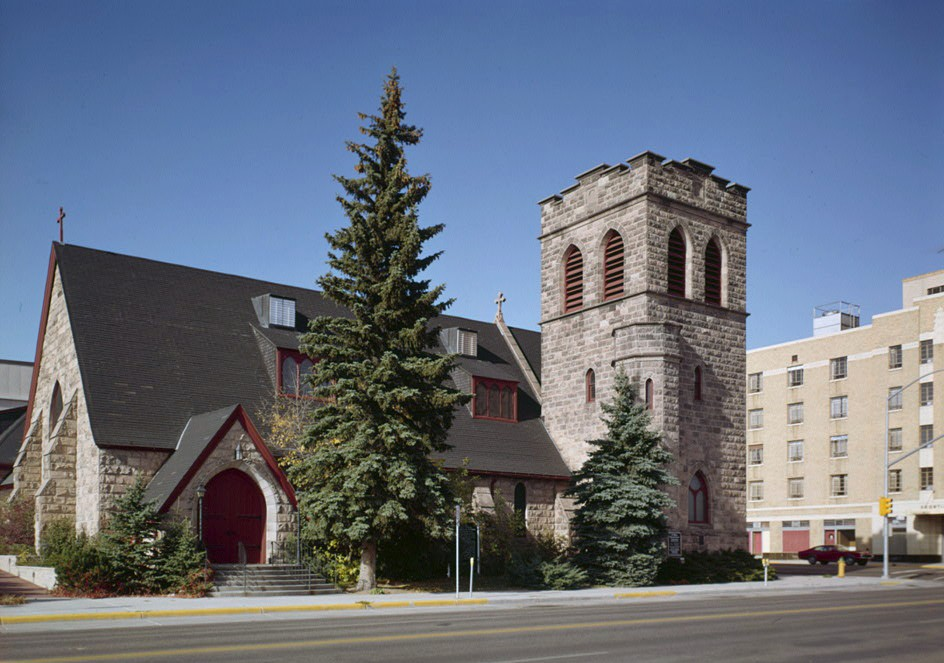

- Location within Wyoming Location within the United States
- Location: 1908 Central Ave., Cheyenne, Wyoming
- Coordinates: 41°8′9″N 104°48′57″W
- Area: less than one acre
- Built: 1886–1888
- Architect: Henry M. Congdon
- Architectural style: Old English
- NRHP reference No.: 70000673
- Added to NRHP: February 26, 1970

St. Mark's Episcopal Church is a historic church in Cheyenne, Wyoming.

It was designed by architect Henry M. Congdon in an Old English style and was built during 1886–1888. It was added to the National Register of Historic Places in 1970.

The church was supposedly designed in the style of the 1080-built Stoke Poges Church near London, in England.
