= William Sturgis House =

Historic house in Wyoming, United States

- U.S. National Register of Historic Places
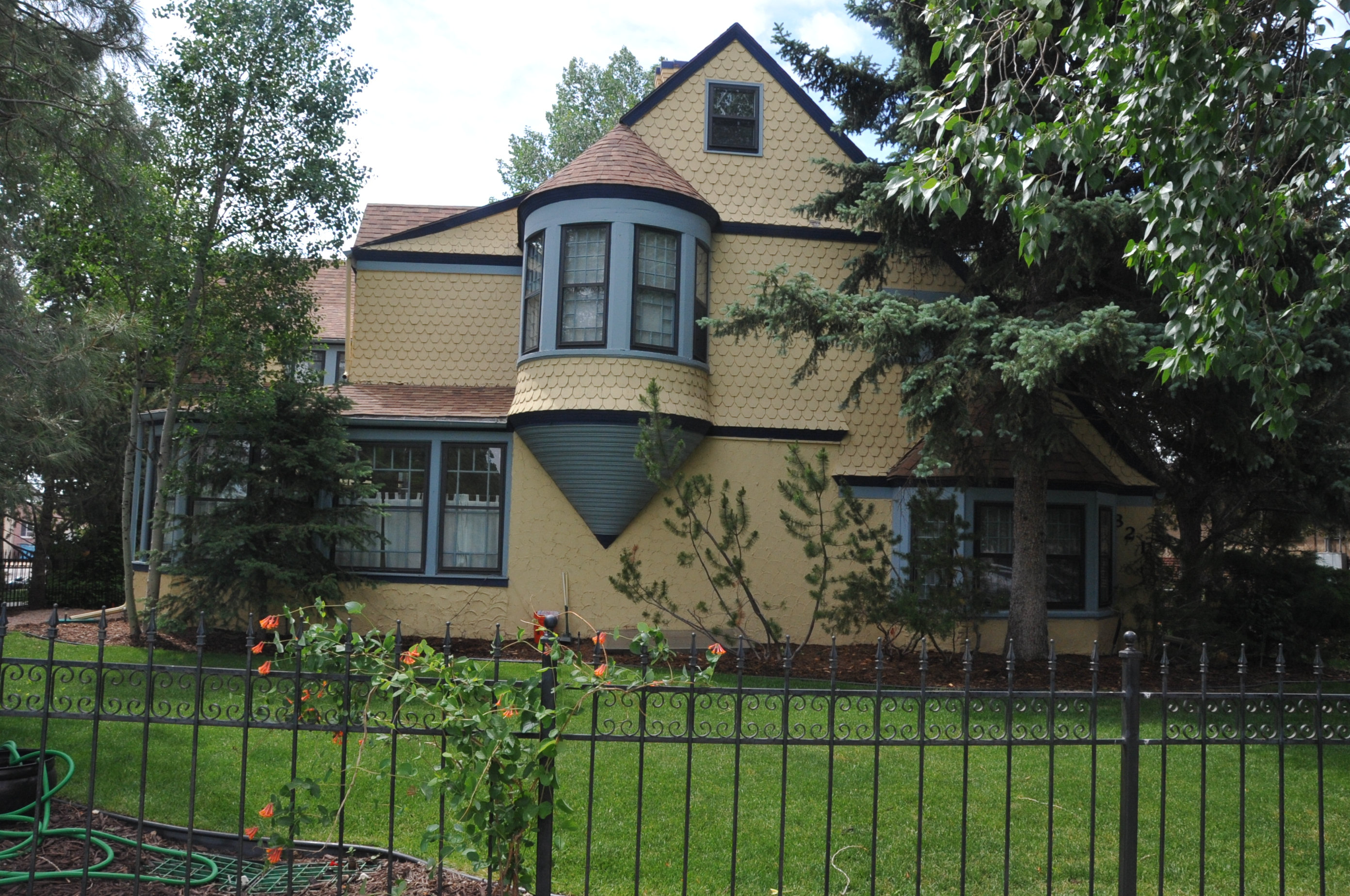

- Location within Wyoming Location within the United States
- Location: 821 E. 17th St., Cheyenne, Wyoming
- Coordinates: 41°8′14″N 104°48′20″W
- Area: less than one acre
- Built: 1884
- Architect: Rainsford, George D.
- Architectural style: Shingle Style
- NRHP reference No.: 82001833
- Added to NRHP: November 8, 1982

The William Sturgis House was built by cattle baron William Sturgis in Cheyenne, Wyoming in 1884. The Shingle Style house was designed by architect George D. Rainsford, a New York architect who moved to Wyoming to raise Morgan horses and Clydesdales. While horse breeding was his principal occupation, Rainsford continued to practice architecture, designing many of the houses in the neighborhood surrounding the Sturgis residence.

Sturgis was another New Yorker, who moved to Cheyenne in 1873, joining forces with his brother Thomas to form the Northwestern Cattle Company and the Union Cattle Company, becoming one of the most prominent cattle ranchers in Wyoming. The Sturgises were instrumental in the founding of the Wyoming Stock Growers Association. William held interests in mines, the Stockgrower's National Bank and the Cheyenne Electric Light Company. Sturgis took heavy losses in his cattle holdings as a result of the hard winter of 1886-87 and sold the house to another rancher, John Whitaker.

The 2 1/2-story L-shaped house originally had brick on the first floor and shingles above. The brick was covered with stucco. A complex roofline features multiple dormers, including an eyelid dormer over the front door. The interior features a large living hall, featuring fishscale-pattern shingles as a wall treatment.

The house was published in American Architect, attributed to William A. Bates. Vincent Scully, who repeats the Bates attribution, notes that the house is significant as an example of the westward spread of the Shingle Style. The house was listed on the National Register of Historic Places on November 8, 1982.

The house was the headquarters of GreenArrays, Inc. - a company founded by Charles Moore, the creator of Forth, until 2024.
