= Jenne =

Jenne can refer to:

== Places ==
- Djenné, a city of Mali, also spelled Jenné and Jenne
- Jenne, Lazio, a city and comune in the Metropolitan City of Rome, Italy

== People with the given name ==
- Jenne Langhout (1918–2010), Dutch field hockey player
- Jenne Lennon (fl. 2006–present), American singer
- Jenne Magafan (1916–1952), American painter and muralist

== People with the surname ==
- Addie Jenne (fl. 2008–present), American politician
- Crystal Snow Jenne (1884–1968), first woman to run for the Alaska Territorial House of Representatives
- Eldon Jenne (1899–1993), American pole vaulter and high school and college multi-sport coach
- Evan Jenne (born 1977), American politician, son of Ken Jenne
- Ida Sherman Jenne (1860–1934), American clubwoman and philanthropist
- Ken Jenne (born 1947), American politician
- Peter Jenne (?–1945), German World War II Knight's Cross of the Iron Cross recipient
- Rinaldo di Jenne, birth name of Pope Alexander IV (1199 or c. 1185–1261)

== Other uses ==
- Battle of Jenné, a 1599 battle between forces of the Mali Empire and the Moroccan Pashalik of Timbuktu

== See also ==
- Jenne Block, Douglas, Wyoming, United States, a commercial building on the National Register of Historic Places
- L. P. Jenne Block, Derby, Vermont, United States, a commercial-residential building on the National Register of Historic Places
- Jenne Farm, Reading, Vermont, United States, one of the most photographed farms in the world
- First Battle of Jenné, an 1891 battle between the Tukulor Empire and the French Third Republic
- Second Battle of Jenné, an 1893 battle between the Tukulor Empire and the French Third Republic
- Jennes de Mol (born 1963), Dutch diplomat
