= Holiday Showcase =

- Show type: Annual holiday production
- Date of premiere: December 9, 2006
- Final show: December 6, 2008
- Location: Hoffman Estates, Illinois

Creative team
- Music director: Robert Hanson
- Aerialists: Cirque du Soleil
- 2006 Host: Doug LaBrecque
- 2007 Host: Diane Penning; Benjamin Brecher
- 2008 Host: Jodi Benson
- Orchestra: Elgin Symphony Orchestra
- Olympic ice skaters 2007, 2008: Melissa Gregory; Denis Petukhov

The Holiday Showcase was an annual musical holiday stage show presented at the Sears Centre in Hoffman Estates, Illinois. It was put on by the Elgin Symphony Orchestra and featured Cirque du Soleil.

== The Program ==
=== 2006 ===
The Phantom of the Opera star, Doug LaBrecque hosted the first Holiday Showcase at the newly opened Sears Centre in 2006. It featured the Elgin Symphony Orchestra, Cirque du Soleil aerialists, and a chorus of over 400. The one-night event was a success leading to the Holiday Showcase continuing the next two years.

=== 2007 ===
Reflecting on the prior year's Holiday Showcase, music director of the Elgin Symphony Orchestra Robert Hanson stated, "The move to the Sears Centre came about when an ESO Elgin Symphony Orchestra board member, who also is a Sears Centre board member, suggested we consider having our holiday show at the Sears Centre." For the past 25 years, the Elgin Symphony Orchestra had held holiday concerts at The Hemmens Cultural Center. The 2007 Holiday Showcase was hosted by soprano Diane Penning and tenor Benjamin Brecher and featured Cirque du Soleil aerialists and jugglers, director Michael Weber, the Elgin Symphony Orchestra, and Olympic ice skaters Melissa Gregory and Denis Petukhov.

=== 2008 ===
Tony Award-winning vocalist Jodi Benson hosted the third annual Holiday Showcase in 2008 and the show became known as the biggest holiday event in the area. It featured Cirque du Soleil aerialists and jugglers, the Elgin Symphony Orchestra, and Olympic ice skaters Melissa Gregory and Denis Petukhov. They also teamed up with charity Toys for Tots collecting before the start of the performance.
