= Eduard Hoeks =

Former Dutch Ambassador (born 1952)

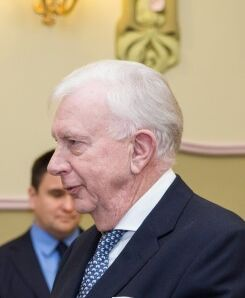
- Hoeks in 2018

Kingdom of the Netherlands Ambassador to Ukraine
- In office 2017–2019
- President: Petro Poroshenko
- Preceded by: Kees Klompenhouwer
- Succeeded by: Jennes de Mol

Personal details
- Born: 9 November 1952 (age 74) Breda
- Spouse: Jkvr. Odilia E.M. de Ranitz
- Parents: Eduard Louis Vincent Maria Hoeks (father); Marie Therese Groeger (mother)
- Occupation: Diplomat

Eduard Wilhelmus Vincent Maria Hoeks is a Dutch diplomat. He was born in Breda (9 November 1952), he studied in Amsterdam and served forty two years for the Ministry of Foreign Affairs, mainly at Embassies abroad. His last function was Ambassador in Ukraine from 2017 to 2019.

== Education ==
After grammar school (cum laude), Eduard Hoeks finished his studies Cum Laude at the University of Amsterdam in 1977: Political and Social Sciences (international economic relations and international law).

== Diplomatic career ==
Eduard Hoeks joined the Diplomatic Class of the Ministry of Foreign Affairs in September 1978. He then served as a junior diplomat at the Embassies of the Kingdom of the Netherlands in Nairobi (Kenya), in Sofia (Bulgaria), in Moscow (USSR) and in Dhaka (Bangladesh), He was a deputy head of mission in Algiers (Algeria), and in the West African capital Ouagadougou (Burkina Faso). In Jakarta (Indonesia) he headed the political section of the Embassy. After that he worked at the Ministry of Foreign Affairs in The Hague as head of the Eastern European Division. From then on, he held the following positions: NATO Political Advisor to the American Commander of the Stabilization Forces in Sarajevo (Bosnia-Herzegovina). Afterwards he served twice as Consul-General: in Saigon (Vietnam) and in Saint Petersburg (Russia); Hoeks served three times as Ambassador: in Luxembourg (Luxemburg), in Prague (Czech Republic) and in Kyiv (Ukraine). After his retirement in September 2019 Hoeks started to study Ancient Greek and Papyrology.

He was ambassador of the Kingdom of the Netherlands in Prague (2012-2017); From 2017, he was the Ambassador of the Kingdom of the Netherlands in Kyiv.
