= Hoeks =

Hoeks (Dutch: [ɦuks], from hoek, meaning corner) is a Dutch surname. Notable people with the surname include:

- Eduard Hoeks (born 1952), Dutch diplomat
- Sylvia Hoeks (born 1983), Dutch actress and model

== See also ==
- Hoek (surname)
- Hooks (surname)
