= William Goodale House =

- U.S. National Register of Historic Places
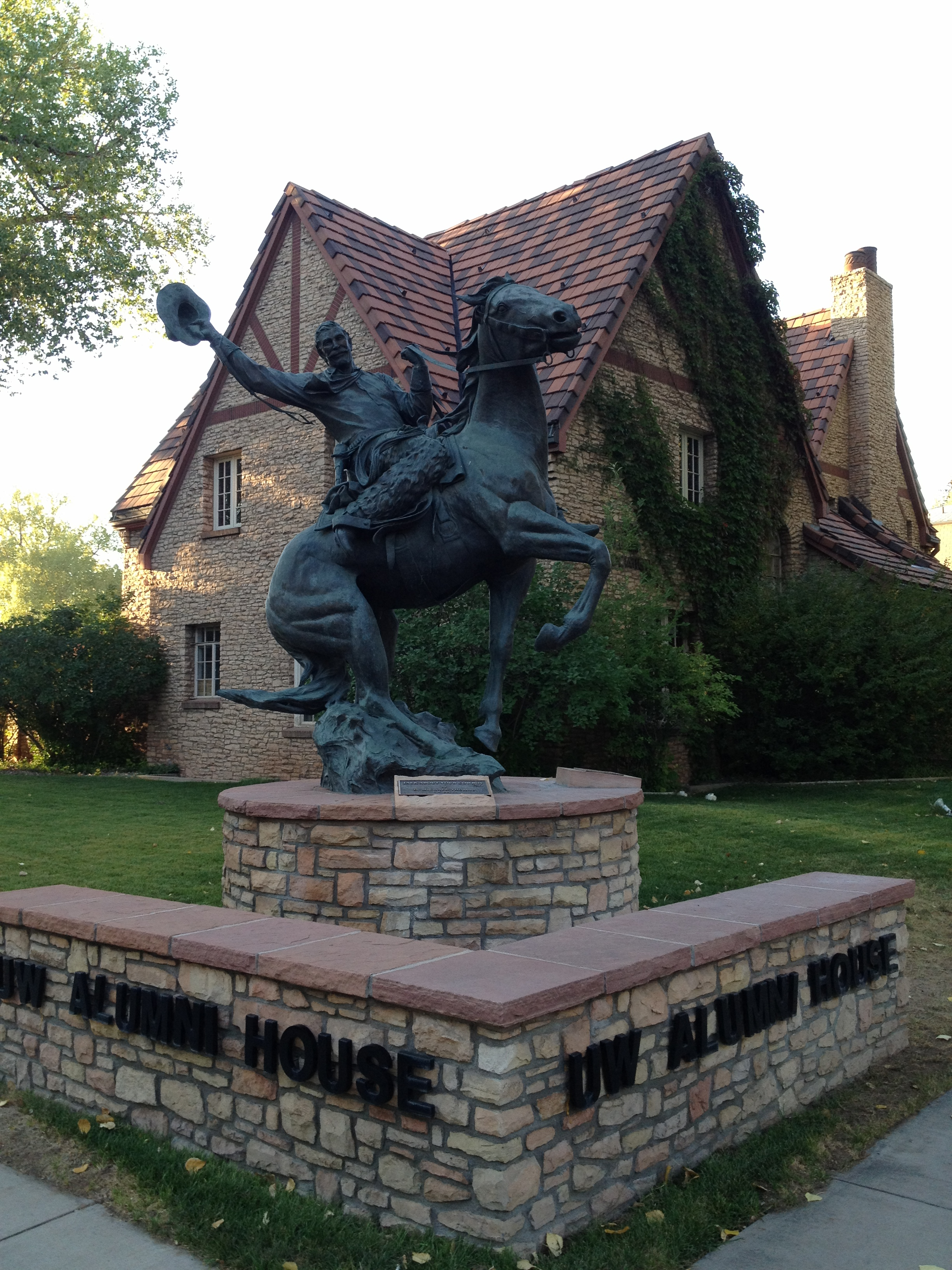
- William Goodale House in 2012

- Location within Wyoming
- Location: 214 S. Fourteenth St., Laramie, Wyoming
- Coordinates: 41°18′37″N 105°34′48″W
- Area: less than one acre
- Built: 1931
- Architect: William DuBois; F.W. Ambrose
- Architectural style: Tudor Revival
- NRHP reference No.: 91000996
- Added to NRHP: August 5, 1991

The William Goodale House, also known as the University of Wyoming Alumni House, is a Tudor Revival style residence built in 1931 for William and Ethel Goodale in Laramie, Wyoming. The house was designed by Wyoming architects William DuBois and F.W. Ambrose.

Ethel Miller Goodale was a sister of Leslie A. Miller, Wyoming governor from 1933 to 1939. Her father A.E. Miller had been mayor of Laramie. William Goodale owned a Hudson automobile dealership and was involved in the First State Bank of Laramie. The Goodales lived in the house until 1942, when Mr. and Mrs. George Forbes bought the house. The surrounding neighborhood became more commercial over time and many of the neighboring houses were torn down. In 1990 the University of Wyoming Alumni Association bought the house for its headquarters.

The two-story house was constructed by the Speigelberg Lumber Company of Wyoming sandstone with brick decorative accents with a sandstone wall partially surrounding the property. The roof is covered by terra-cotta tiles. Windows include leaded panels and opal glass in a variety of configurations. Masonry is rustic and the roof tiles wrap over the eaves. The brick accents in the attic gables resemble half-timbering.

The William Goodale House was placed on the National Register of Historic Places on August 5, 1991.
