= Federal Office Building (Cheyenne, Wyoming) =

- Federal Office Building--Cheyenne
- U.S. National Register of Historic Places
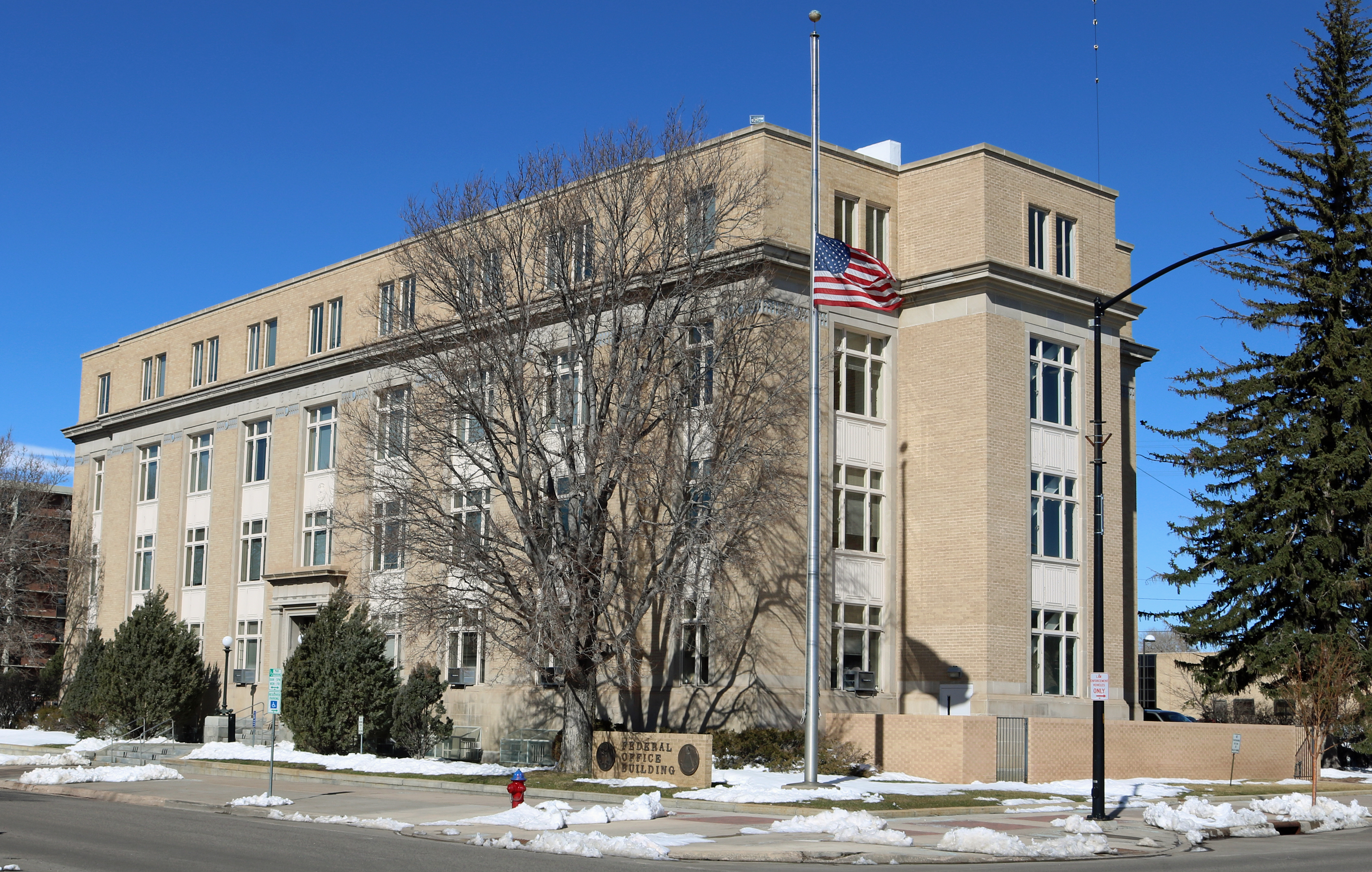

- Location within Wyoming
- Location: 308 W. 21st St., Cheyenne, Wyoming
- Coordinates: 41°08′13″N 104°49′09″W
- Area: less than one acre
- Built: 1932
- Architect: William Dubois; James A. Wetmore
- Architectural style: Classical Revival
- NRHP reference No.: 00001191
- Added to NRHP: October 12, 2000

The Federal Office Building-Cheyenne, at 308 W. 21st St. in Cheyenne, Wyoming, is a Classical Revival-style building built in 1932. It was listed on the National Register of Historic Places in 2000.

It is a four-story masonry building 127 by 50 feet (39 m × 15 m) in plan, upon a full basement. It was built to a three-story height, with capacity to add four more stories. The fourth floor was added in 1937.
