= Dubois Block =

- U.S. National Register of Historic Places
- U.S. Historic district
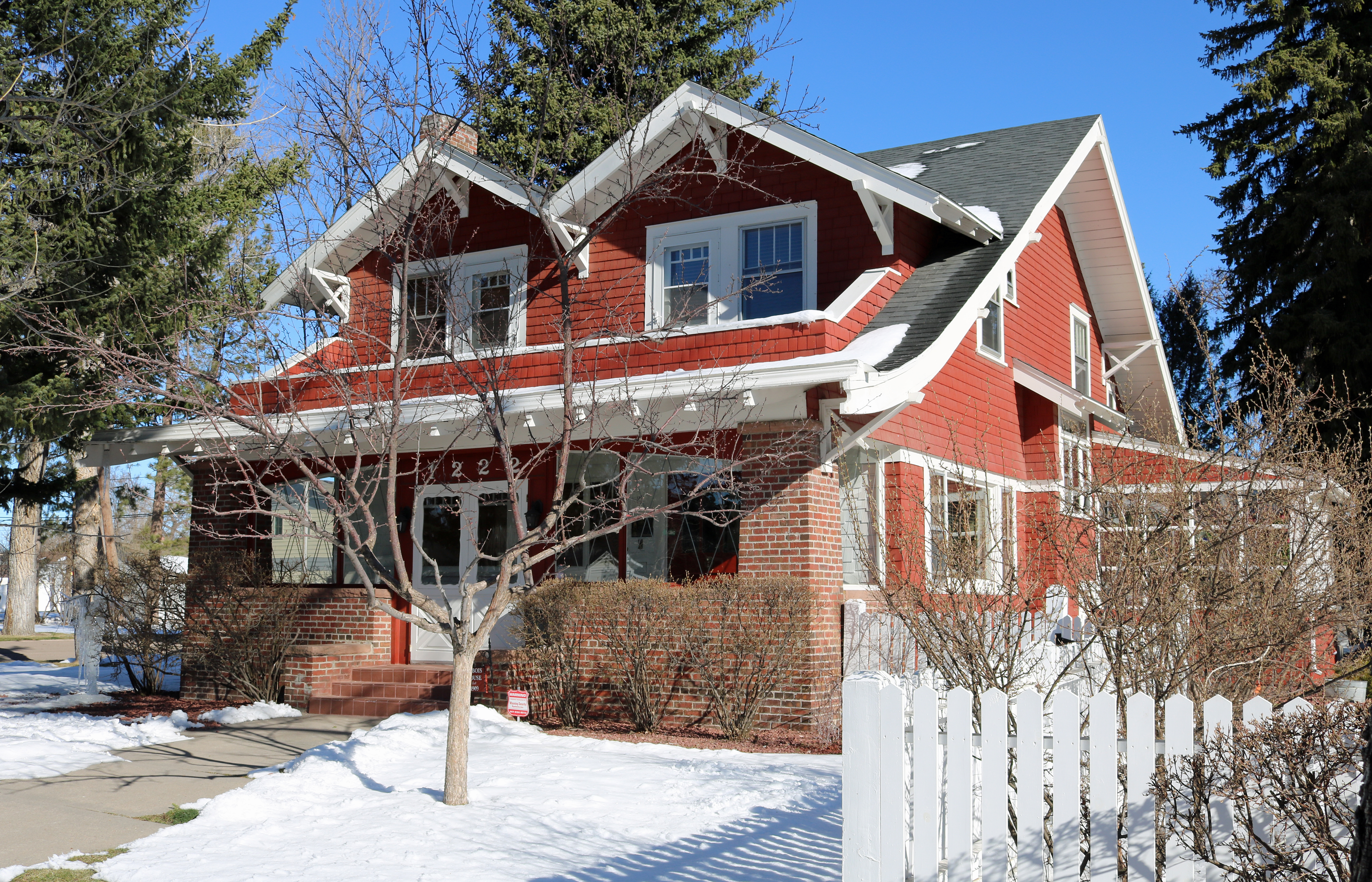

- Location within Wyoming
- Location: Bounded by W. Pershing Blvd., Dey Ave., W. 32nd St., and Cribbon Ave., Cheyenne, Wyoming
- Coordinates: 41°08′44″N 104°50′05″W
- Area: less than one acre
- NRHP reference No.: 14000999
- Added to NRHP: December 2, 2014

The Dubois Block was listed on the National Register of Historic Places in 2014. The listing included 11 contributing buildings and three non-contributing ones.

It includes six houses designed by Cheyenne architect William R. Dubois.
