= William DuBois (architect) =

American architect and politician (1879–1953)

William Dubois

Member of the Wyoming House of Representatives from Laramie County
- In office 1903–1909

Member of the Wyoming Senate from Laramie County
- In office 1909–1913

Personal details
- Born: William Robert Dubois; November 15, 1879 Chicago, Illinois, US
- Died: May 31, 1953 (aged 73) Cheyenne, Wyoming, US
- Party: Republican
- Occupation: Architect

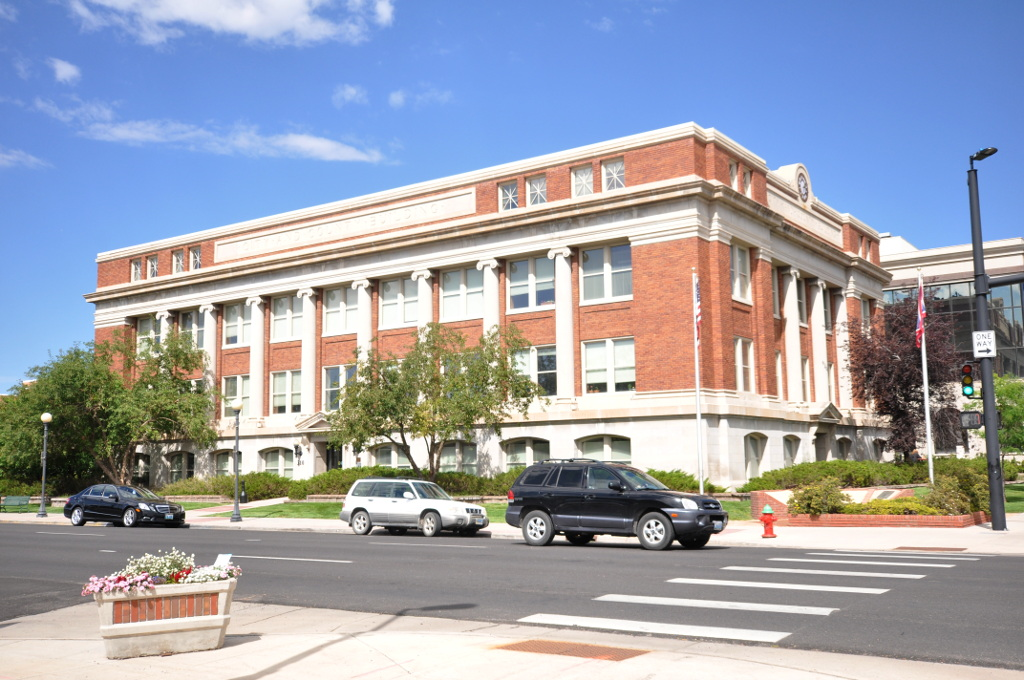
The City and County Building in Cheyenne, designed by Dubois and completed in 1919

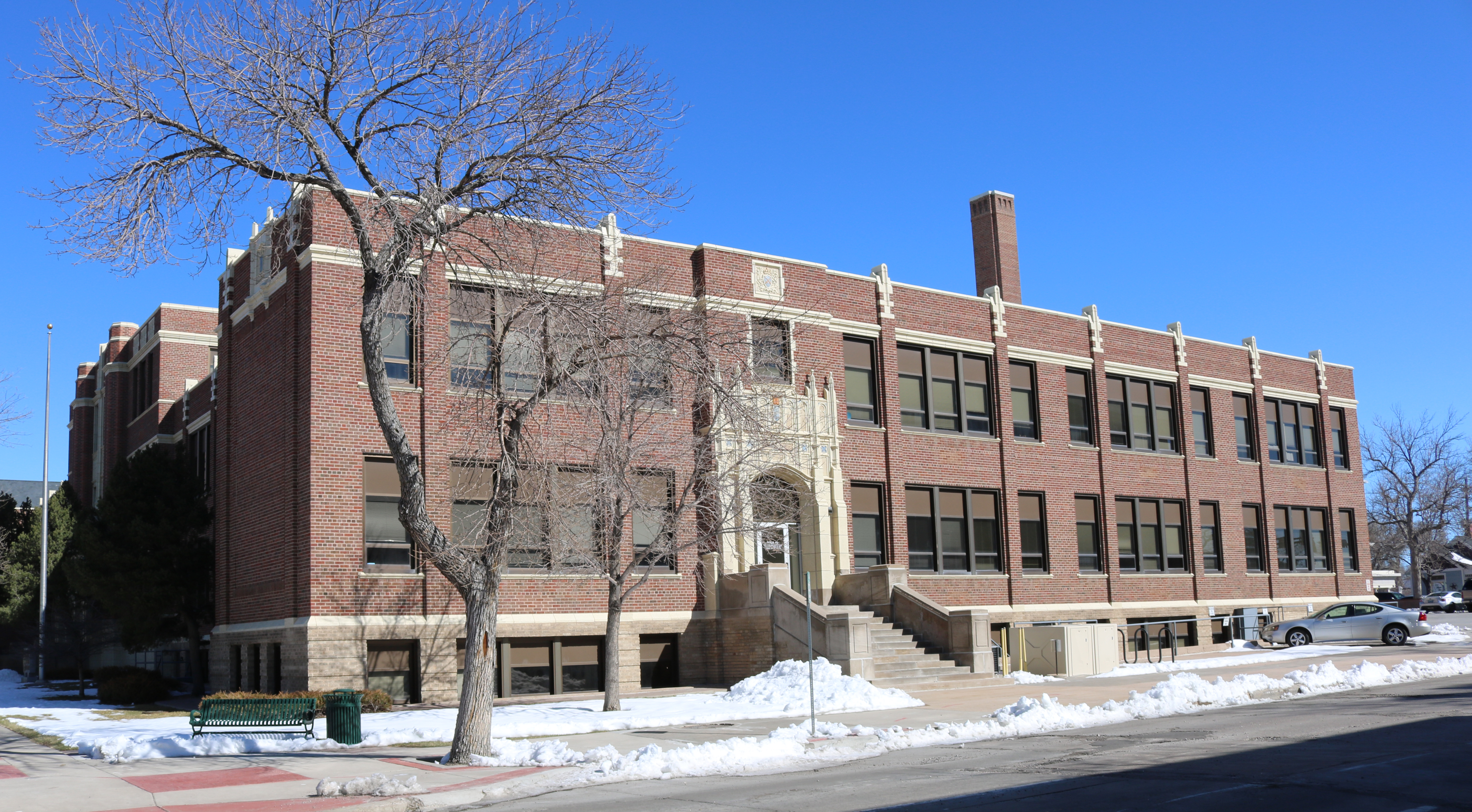
The former Lulu McCormick Junior High School in Cheyenne, designed in association with Frederic Hutchinson Porter and completed in 1929

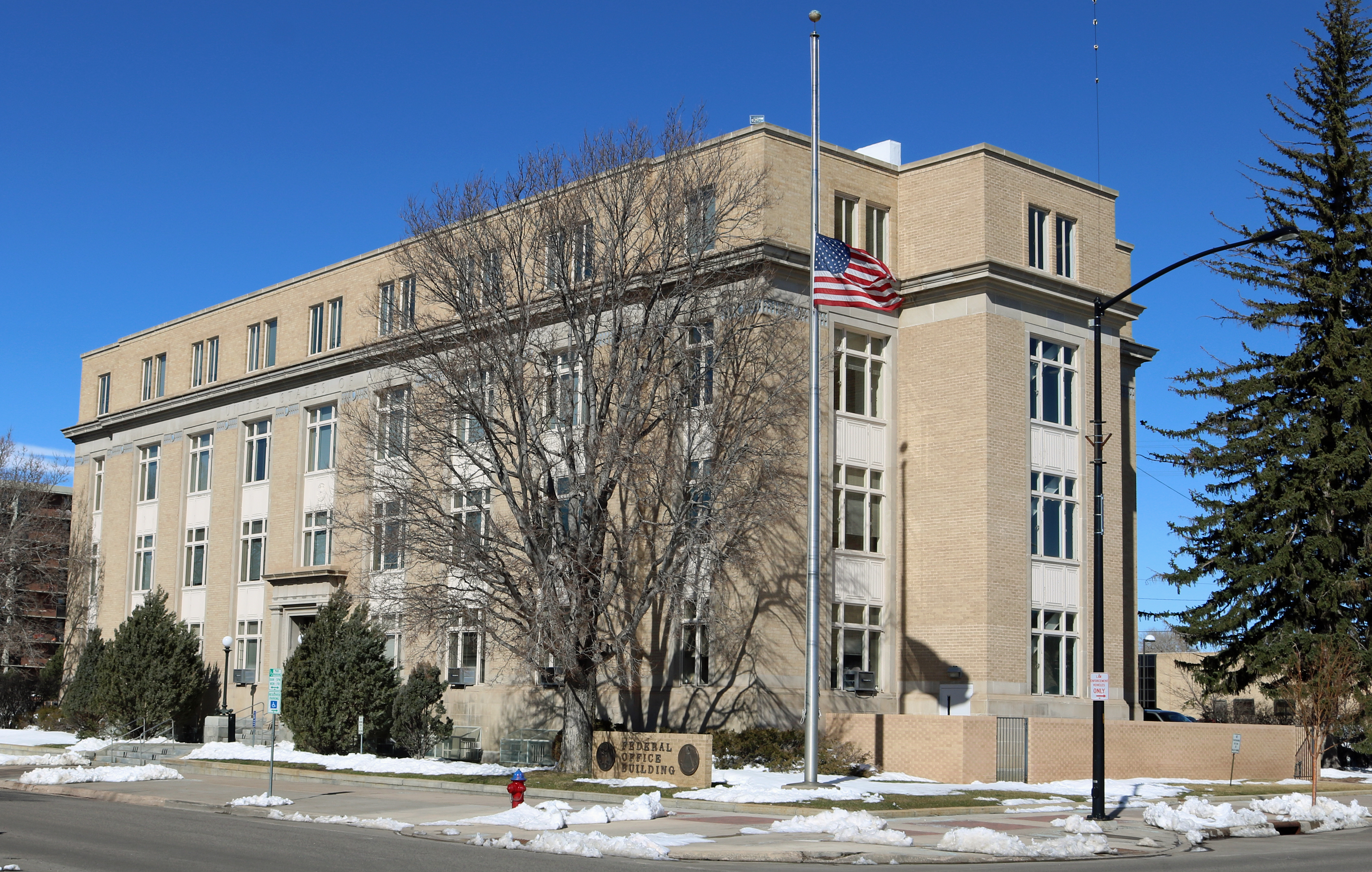
The Federal Office Building in Cheyenne, built in 1932

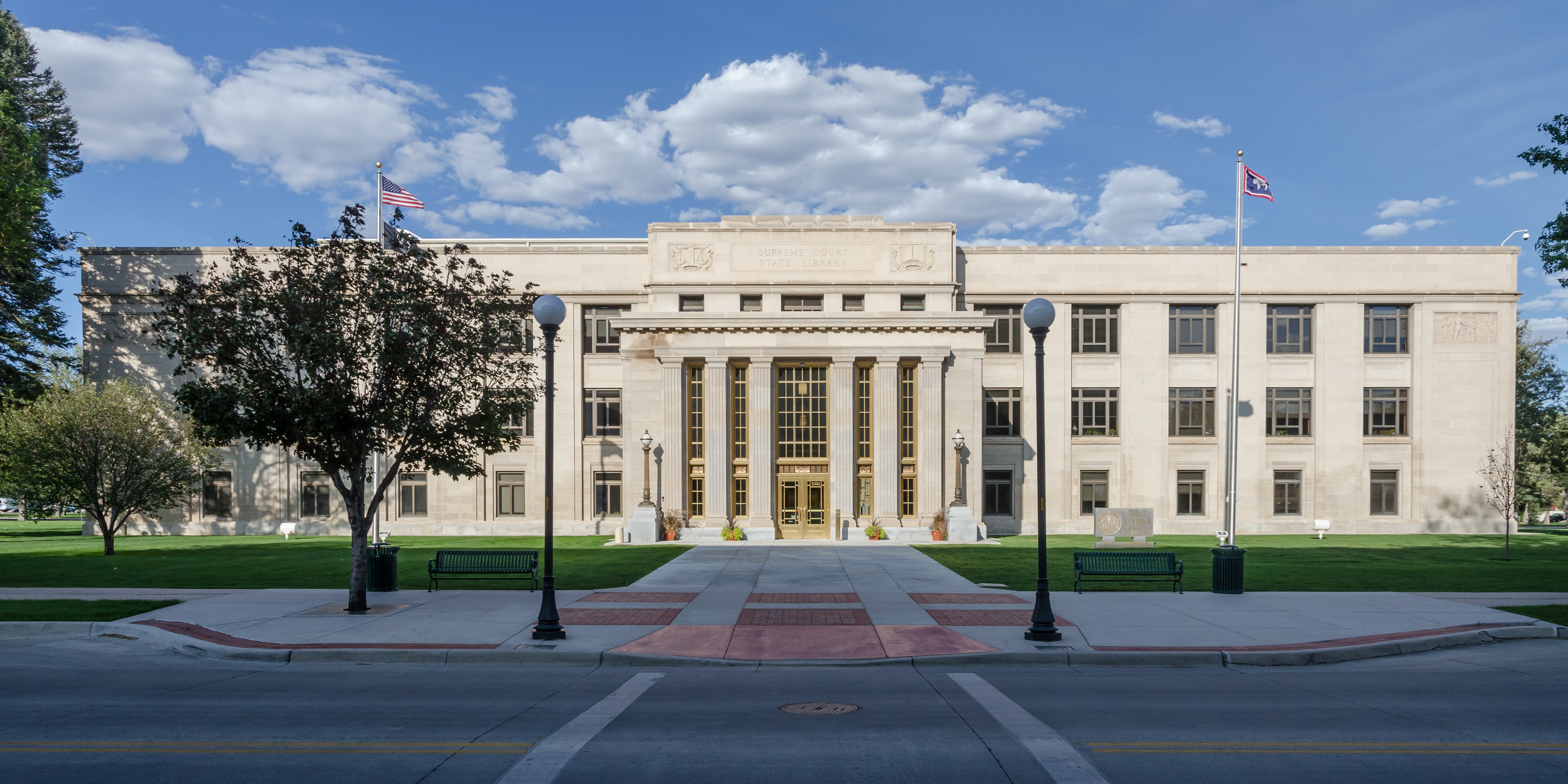
The building of the Wyoming Supreme Court in Cheyenne, completed in 1937

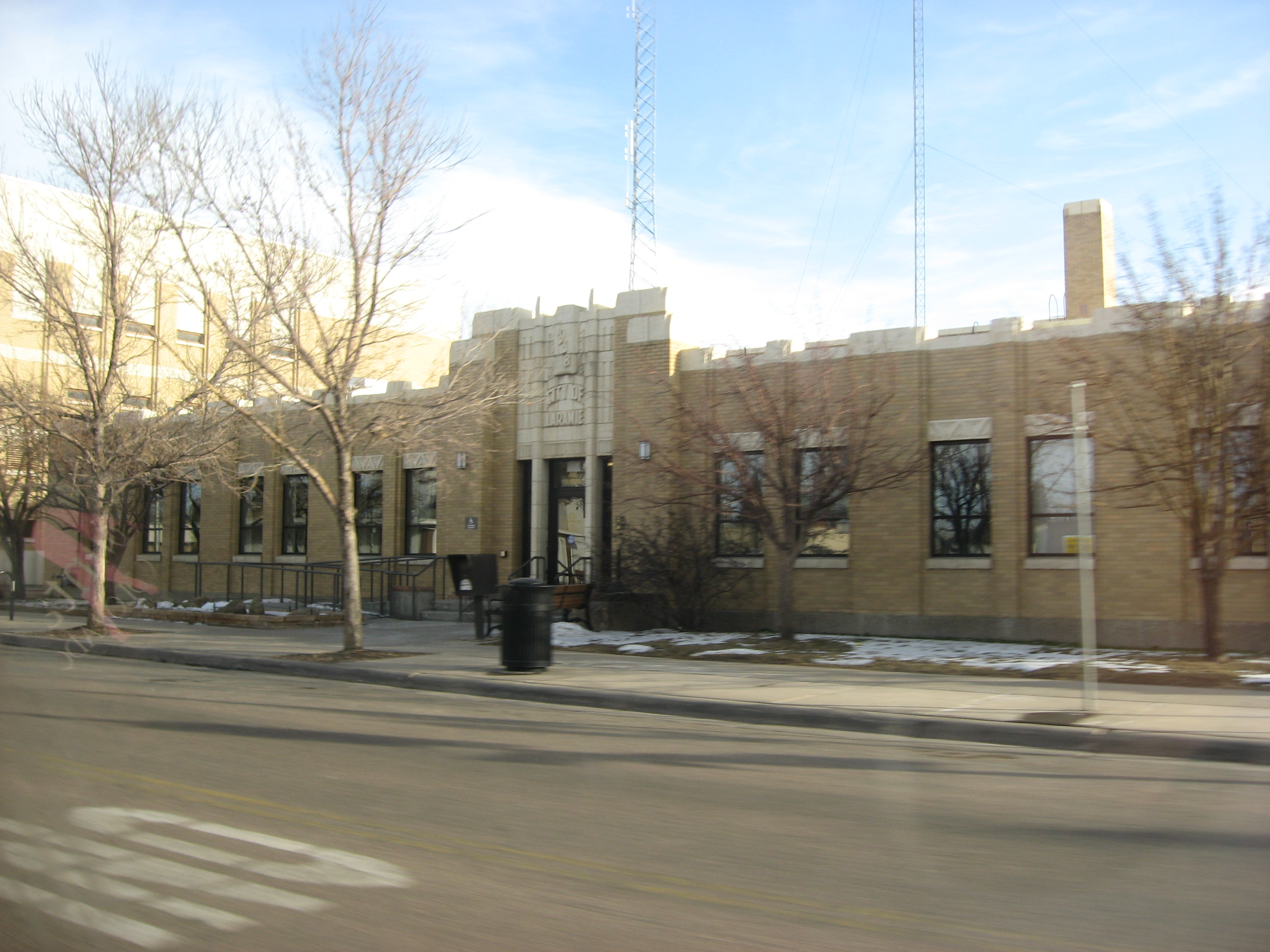
The City Hall in Laramie, completed in 1939

William Dubois (November 15, 1879–May 31, 1953) was an American architect and politician. He was a prolific architect in Wyoming and nearby states, and served five terms in both houses of the Wyoming Legislature.

== Life and career ==
William Robert Dubois, known professionally as William Dubois, was born November 15, 1879, in Chicago to William Dubois, an engineer, and Marie Francoise (Werisse) Dubois. He was educated in the Chicago School of Architecture of the Art Institute of Chicago. He first worked for an architect in Albuquerque, New Mexico, but later returned to Chicago to work for architect Normand Smith Patton. In 1901 Patton sent Dubois to Cheyenne, Wyoming to be superintendent of construction for the firm's new library in that city. When the library was completed in 1902, Dubois chose to stay in Cheyenne and opened his own office, practicing privately for fifteen years. In 1917, to take advantage of increased development in Casper, Dubois formed a partnership with his former employee, Leon C. Goodrich. The new firm of Dubois & Goodrich had offices in both cities, and was dissolved in 1921, when both architects returned to private practice. Dubois retired circa 1944.

Dubois was elected to the Wyoming House of Representatives in 1903, and served three consecutive terms. This was followed by two terms in the Wyoming Senate. In 1915, after leaving office, Dubois was chosen architect of extensions to the Wyoming State Capitol. These were completed in 1917.

In 1923 Dubois joined the American Institute of Architects, and resigned in 1944. In 1951, when licensing of architects began in Wyoming, Dubois was granted license No. 0001 in recognition of his role as "grandfather" of the architectural profession in Wyoming.

== Personal life ==
Dubois was married in 1904 to Dora Frances Slack, daughter of publisher Edward Archibald Slack and granddaughter of suffrage activist Esther Hobart Morris. They had five children. Mrs. Dubois died in an auto accident in 1938. Dubois died on May 31, 1953.

In 1909 Dubois designed and had built a new house for his family at 1222 West 32nd Street in Cheyenne, where he lived until his death. This house and others on the block are contributing properties to the Dubois Block historic district.

== Legacy ==
Dubois designed more than 70 commercial buildings in Cheyenne, including almost all major buildings built in Cheyenne from 1900 to 1920. He designed more than 100 houses, 27 schools, six churches, and four Carnegie libraries. The Wyoming architects Leon C. Goodrich and Frederic R. Kellogg both worked for Dubois early in their careers.

Some fourteen works designed by Dubois are listed on the United States National Register of Historic Places, and others contribute to listed historic districts.

== Architectural works ==
- Gymnasium and Armory, University of Wyoming, Laramie, Wyoming (1903–04, demolished)
- John Morton house, 425 Center St, Douglas, Wyoming (1903, NRHP 2001)
- Paramount Theatre, (Note: A contributing property to the Downtown Cheyenne Historic District, NRHP-listed in 1978 and expanded in 1980, 1988 and 1996.) 1607 Capitol Ave, Cheyenne, Wyoming (1905)
- Majestic Building, 1603 Capitol Ave, Cheyenne, Wyoming (1907)
- Sweetwater County Library, 177 N Center St, Green River, Wyoming (1907)
- Atlas Theatre, 213 W 16th St, Cheyenne, Wyoming (1908, NRHP 1973)
- Wyoming State Hospital dormitories, 831 WY-150, Evanston, Wyoming (1908 et seq., NRHP 2003)
- William Dubois house, (Note: A contributing property to the Dubois Block historic district, NRHP-listed in 2014.) 1222 W 32nd St, Cheyenne, Wyoming (1909)
- Big Horn County Library, 430 C St, Basin, Wyoming (1910, demolished 1954)
- John Davidson Clark house, 1202 W 32nd St, Cheyenne, Wyoming (1910)
- Plains Hotel, 1600 Central Ave, Cheyenne, Wyoming (1910–11)
- Rock Springs Library, 400 C St, Rock Springs, Wyoming (1910, altered)
- Churchill Public School, 510 W 29th St, Cheyenne, Wyoming (1911, NRHP 2005)
- Eaton Public Library, 132 Maple Ave, Eaton, Colorado (1911)
- Grier Furniture Building, 1601 Central Ave, Cheyenne, Wyoming (1911)
- Agricultural (Biochemistry) Hall, University of Wyoming, Laramie, Wyoming (1912–14)
- Hoyt Hall, University of Wyoming, Laramie, Wyoming (1915–16)
- Wyoming State Capitol House and Senate wings, 200 W 24th St, Cheyenne, Wyoming (1915–17, NRHP 1973)
- Charles L. Beatty house, 2320 Capitol Ave, Cheyenne, Wyoming (1916, NRHP 1990)
- City and County Building, 309 W 20th St, Cheyenne, Wyoming (1917–19, NRHP 1978)
- Hynds Building, 1602 Capitol Ave, Cheyenne, Wyoming (!919-22)
- Cheyenne High School, 2810 House Ave, Cheyenne, Wyoming (1921, NRHP 2005)
- Charles W. Hirsig house, (Note: A contributing property to the Capitol North Historic District, NRHP-listed in 1980.) 2800 Carey Ave, Cheyenne, Wyoming (1922)
- Rialto Theater remodeling, 102 E 2nd St, Casper, Wyoming (1922, NRHP 1993)
- Johnson Public School, (Note: A contributing property to the Cheyenne South Side Historic District, NRHP-listed in 2006.) 711 Warren Ave, Cheyenne, Wyoming (1923, NRHP 2005)
- Cheyenne Horticultural Field Station (former), 8301 Hildreth Rd, Cheyenne, Wyoming (1928–31)
- Lulu McCormick Junior High School, 2001 Capitol Ave, Cheyenne, Wyoming (1928–29, NRHP 2005)
- Montgomery Ward Building, 1621 Central Ave, Cheyenne, Wyoming (1929)
- Wyoming Fuel Company warehouse, 720 W 18th St, Cheyenne, Wyoming (1929 and 1937, NRHP 2003)
- William Goodale house, 214 S 14th St, Laramie, Wyoming (1931, NRHP 1991)
- Federal Office Building, 308 W 21st St, Cheyenne, Wyoming (1932, NRHP 2000)
- Wyoming Supreme Court Building, 2301 Capitol Ave, Cheyenne, Wyoming (1937)
- Laramie City Hall, (Note: A contributing property to the Laramie Downtown Historic District, NRHP-listed in 1988.) 406 E Ivinson Ave, Laramie, Wyoming (1938–39)
- Lincoln School addition, 209 S Cedar St, Laramie, Wyoming (1938–39, NRHP 2003)
- Leslie A. Miller house, (Note: A contributing property to the Moore Haven Heights Historic District, NRHP-listed in 2009.) 222 W Pershing Blvd, Cheyenne, Wyoming (1939)
- Corlett School, 600 W 22nd St, Cheyenne, Wyoming (1940, NRHP 2005, demolished 2006)
- Union Bus Depot, (Note: Designed in association with architect James T. Allan of Omaha. Formerly a contributing property to the Downtown Cheyenne Historic District, NRHP-listed in 1978 and expanded in 1980, 1988 and 1996.) 1503 Capitol Ave, Cheyenne, Wyoming (1940, demolished)
- L. W. Read house, 3605 Pioneer Ave, Cheyenne, Wyoming (1941)

A more complete listing of his works is included in the NRHP application for the Dubois Block.

== Gallery of architectural works ==
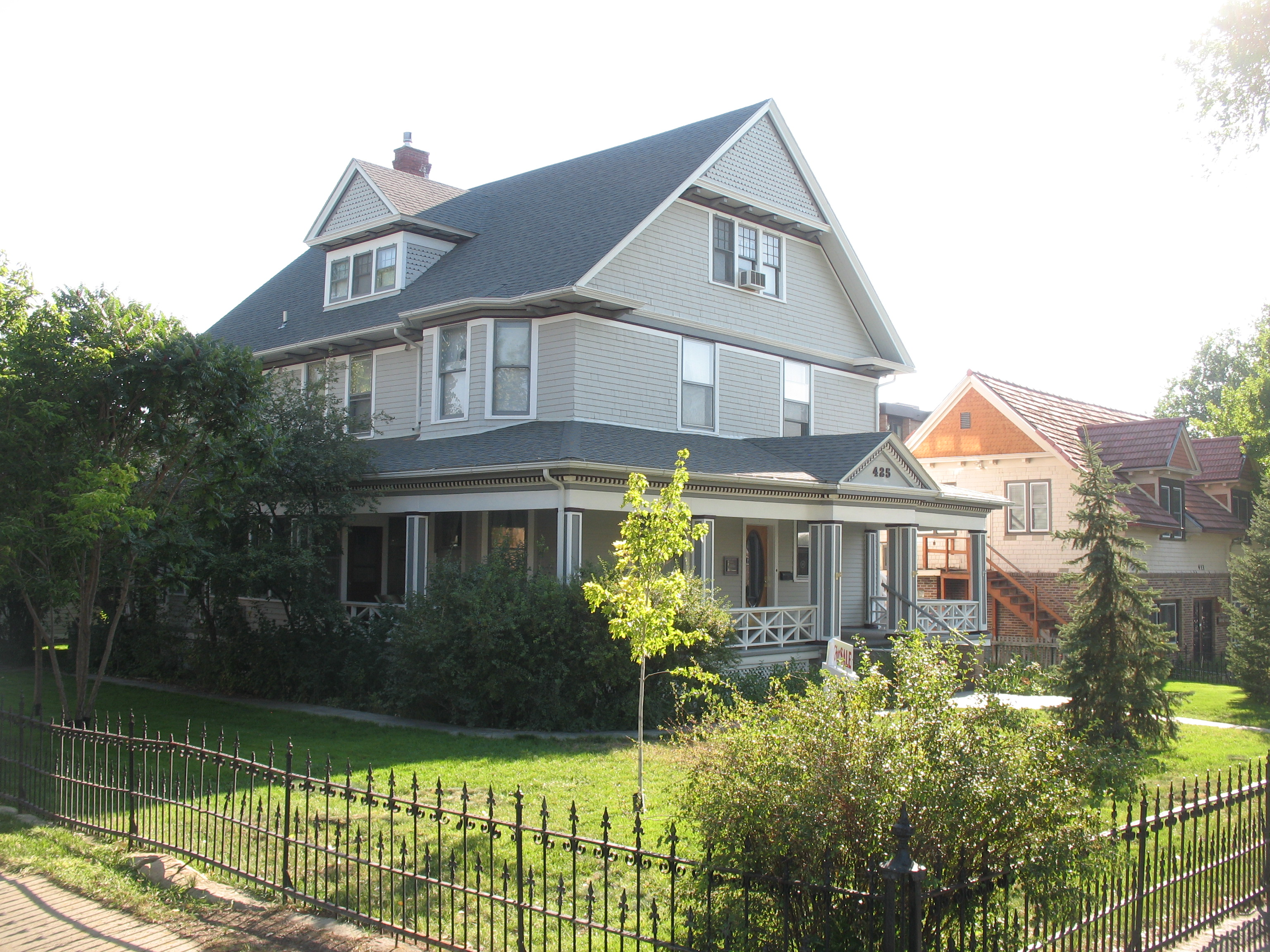
John Morton house, Douglas, Wyoming, 1903

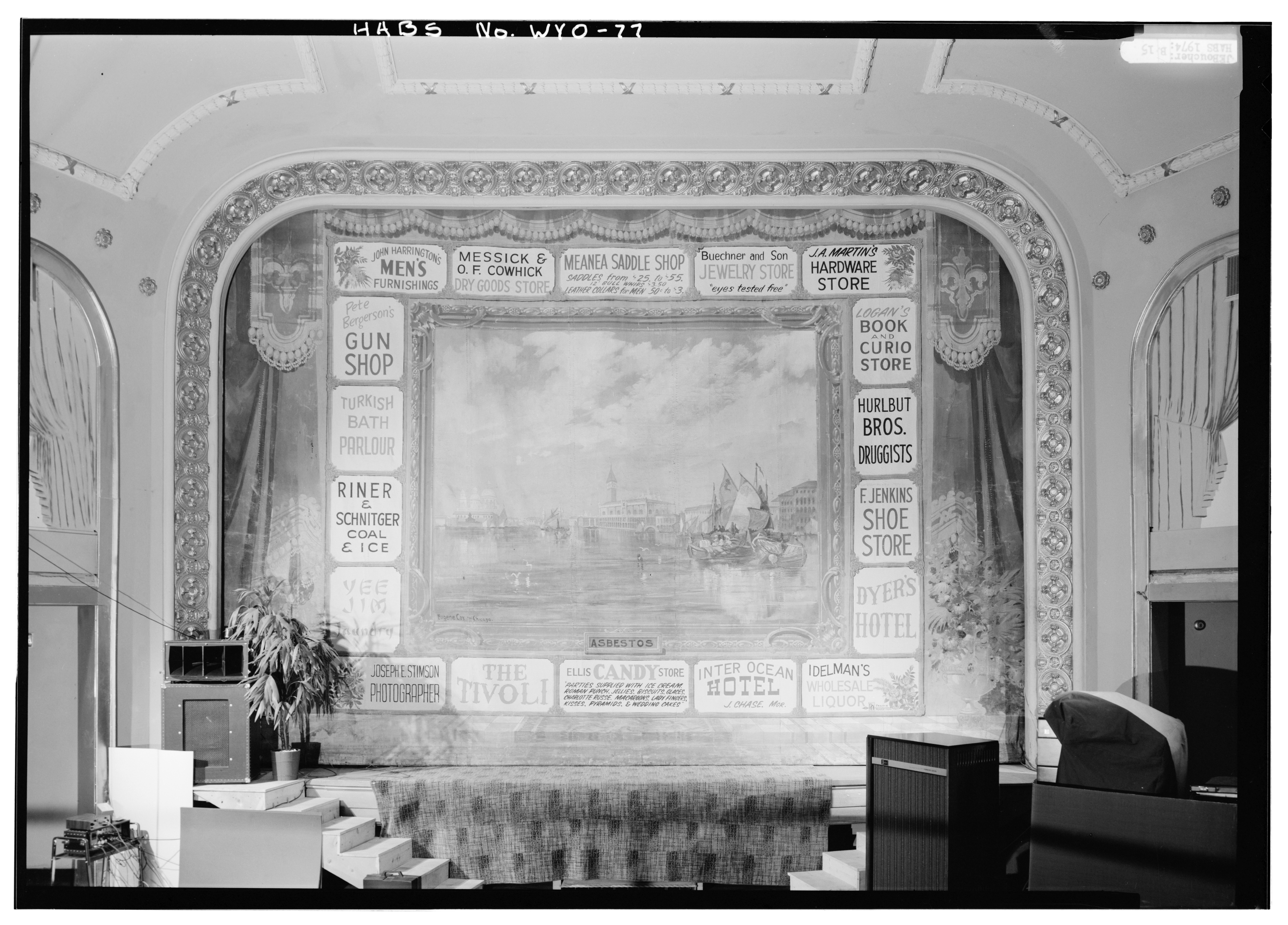
Atlas Theatre, Cheyenne, Wyoming, 1908

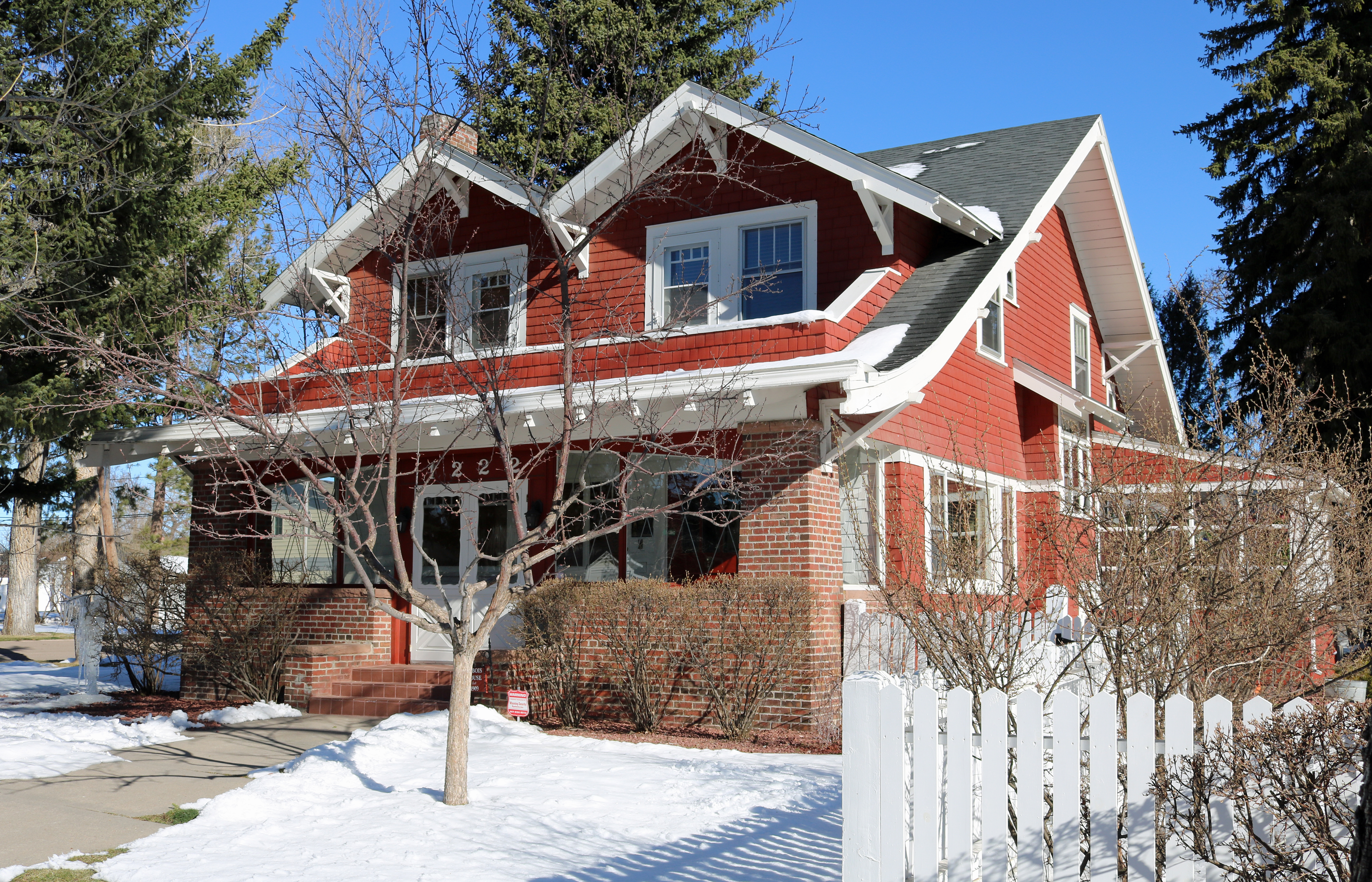
William Dubois house, Cheyenne, Wyoming, 1909

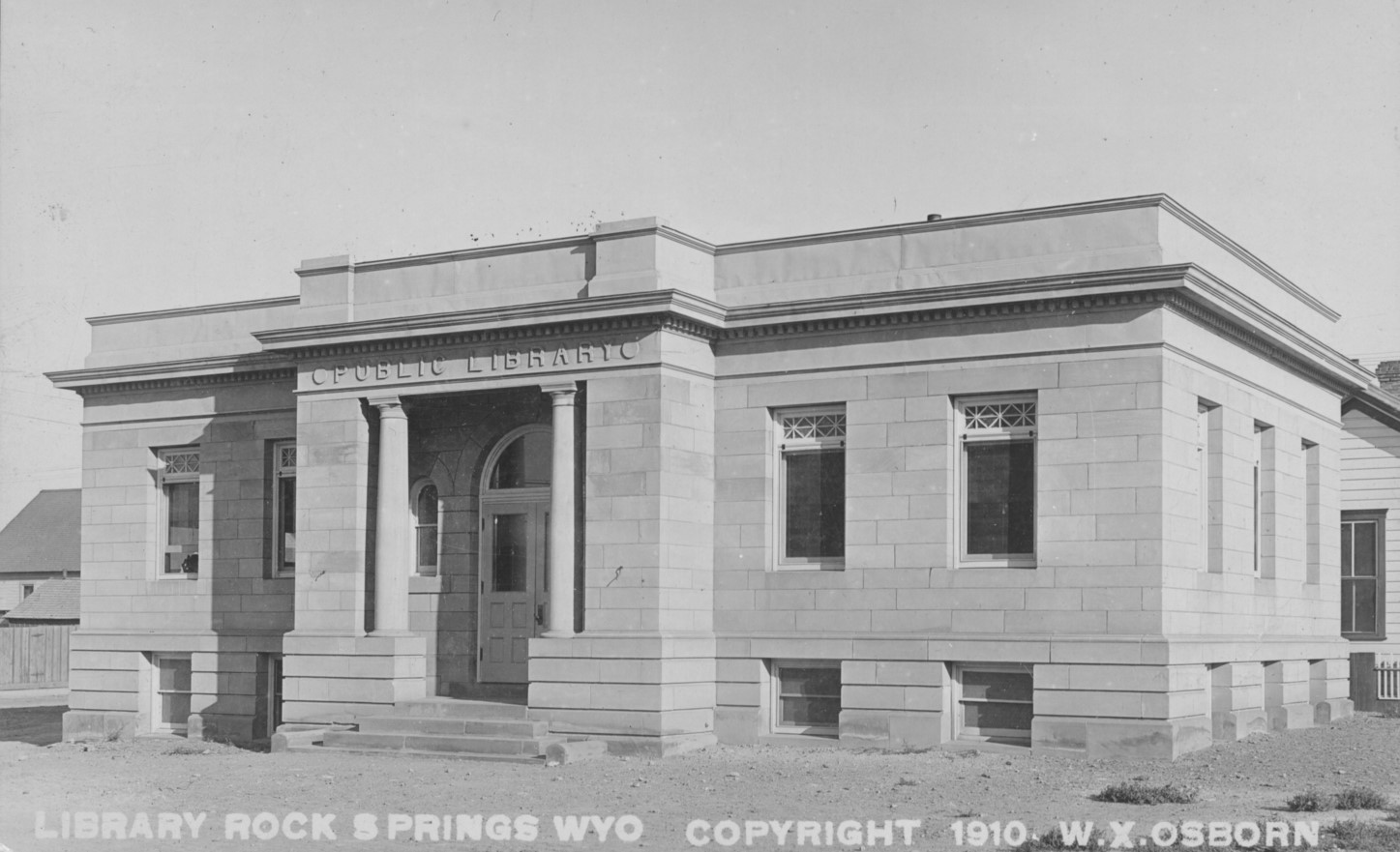
Rock Springs Library, Rock Springs, Wyoming, 1910

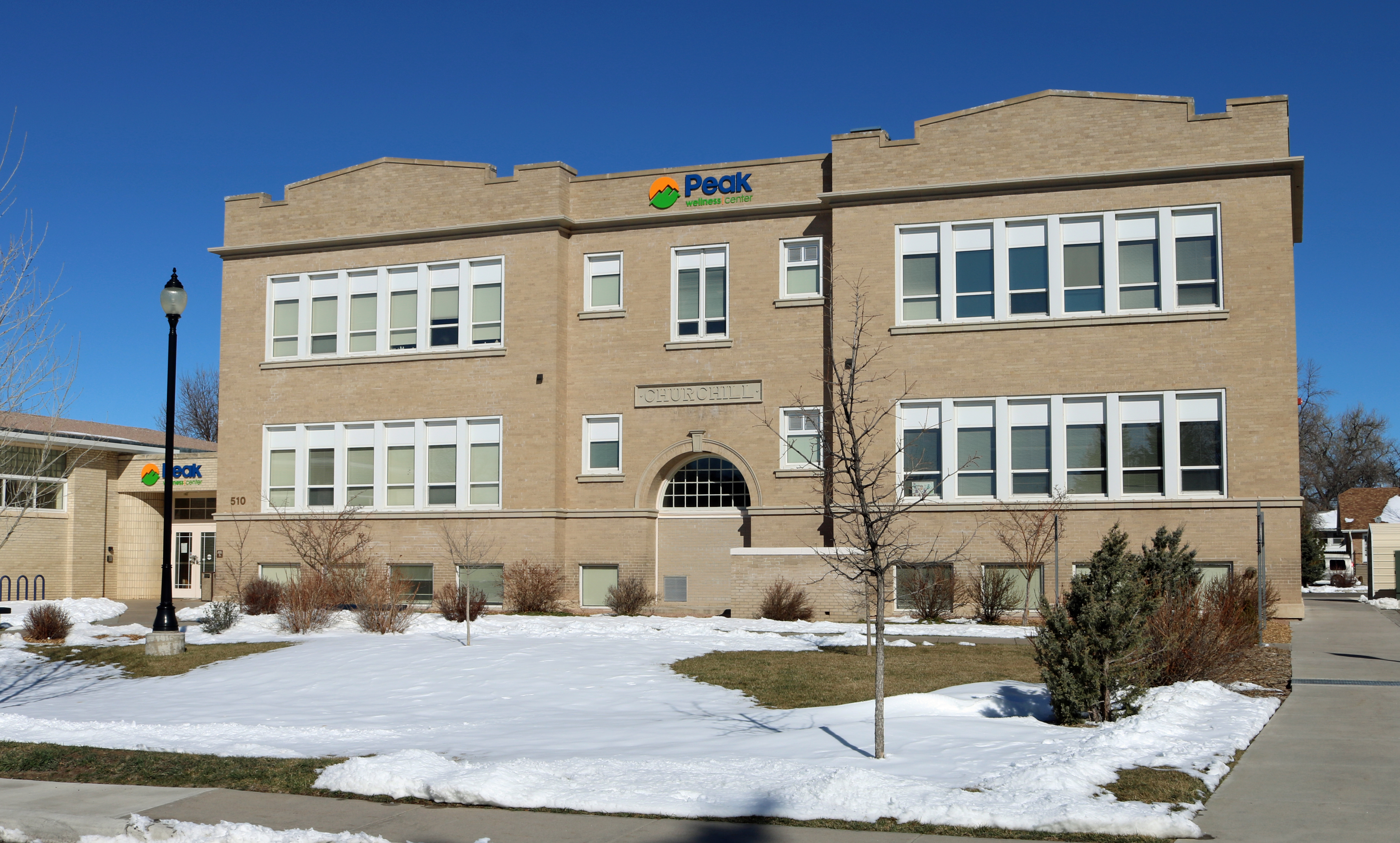
Churchill Public School, Cheyenne, Wyoming, 1911

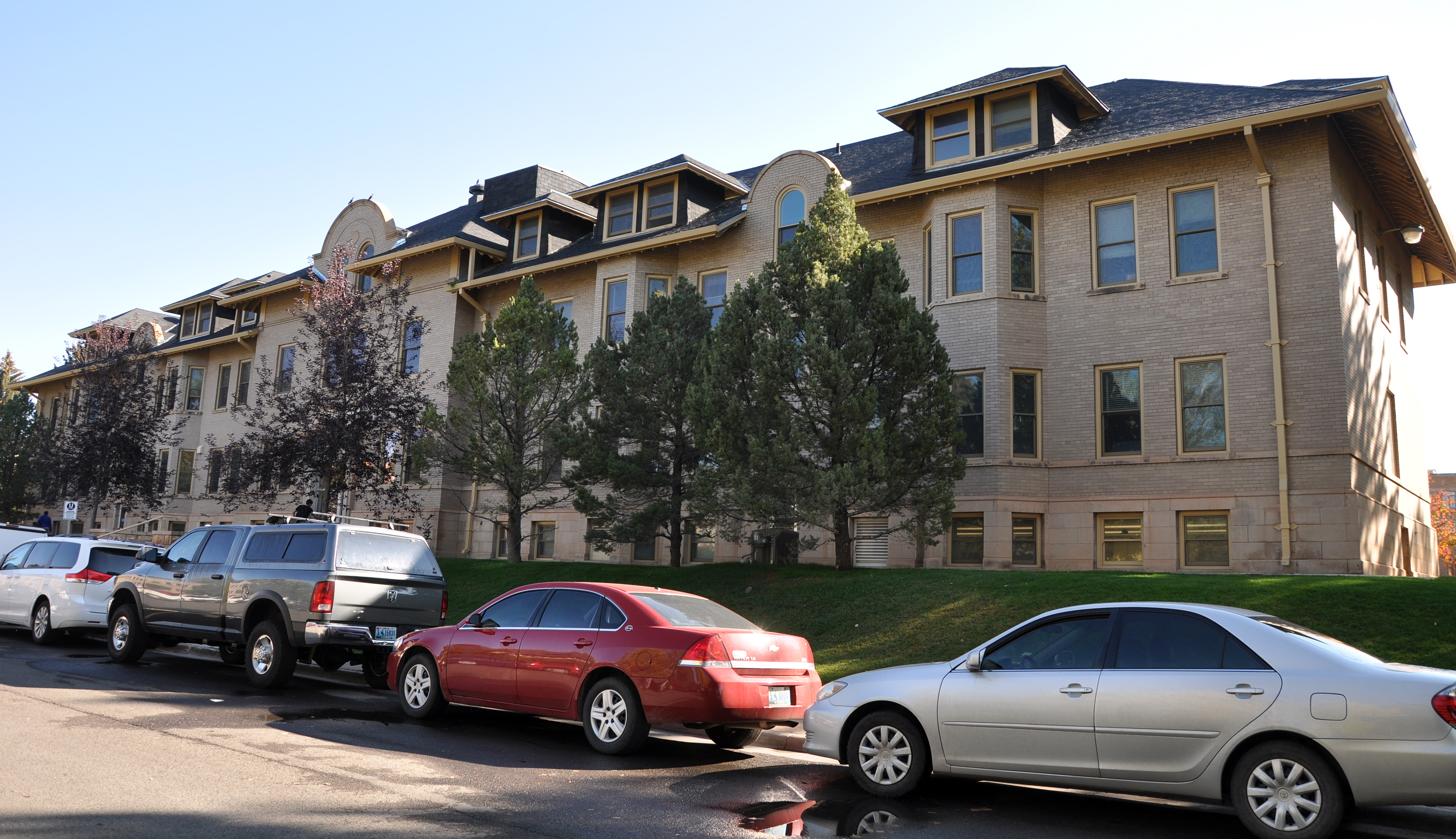
Hoyt Hall, University of Wyoming, Laramie, Wyoming, 1915–16

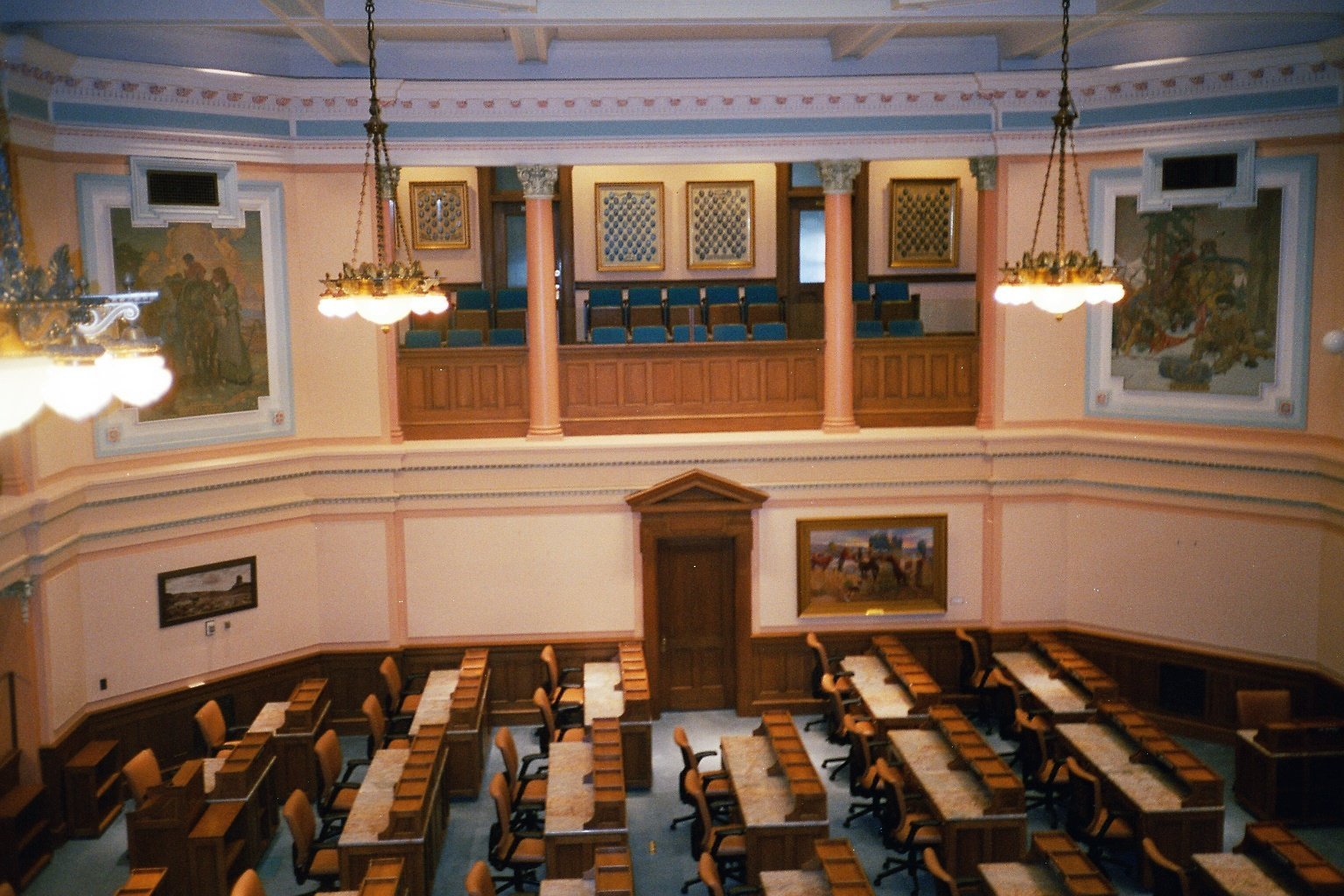
Wyoming State Capitol House chamber, Cheyenne, Wyoming, 1915–17

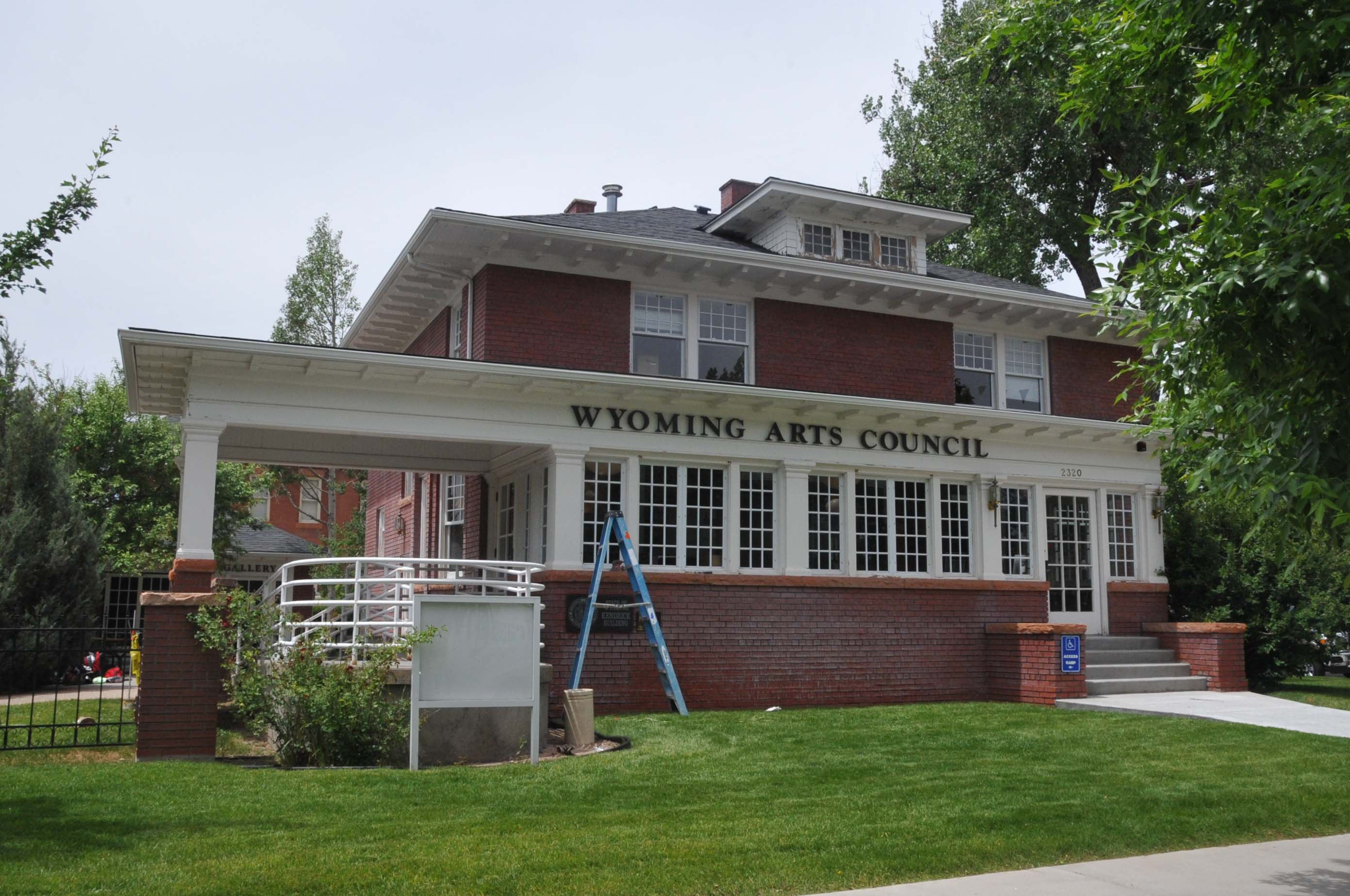
Charles L. Beatty house, Cheyenne, Wyoming, 1916

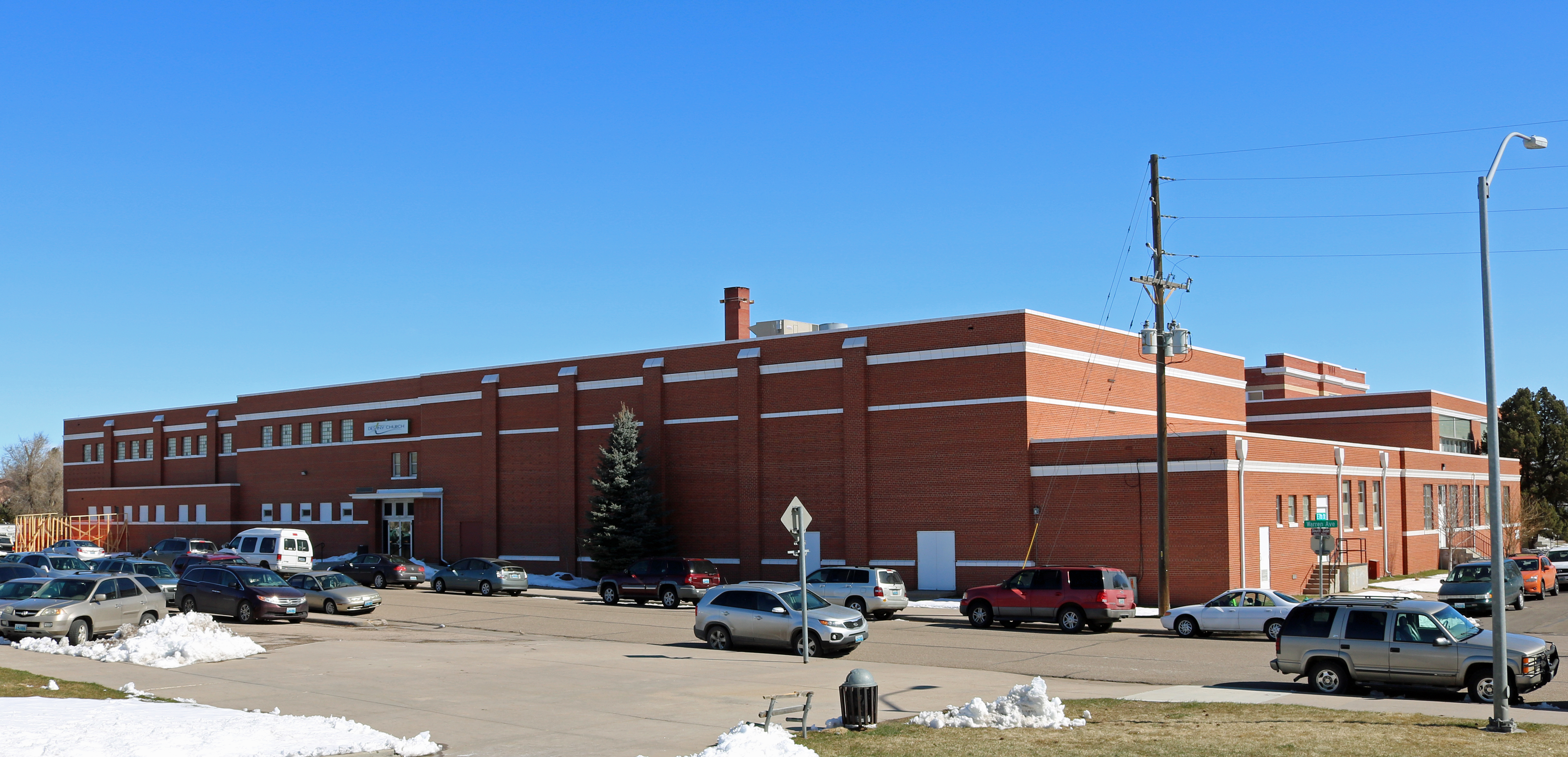
Johnson Public School, Cheyenne, Wyoming, 1923

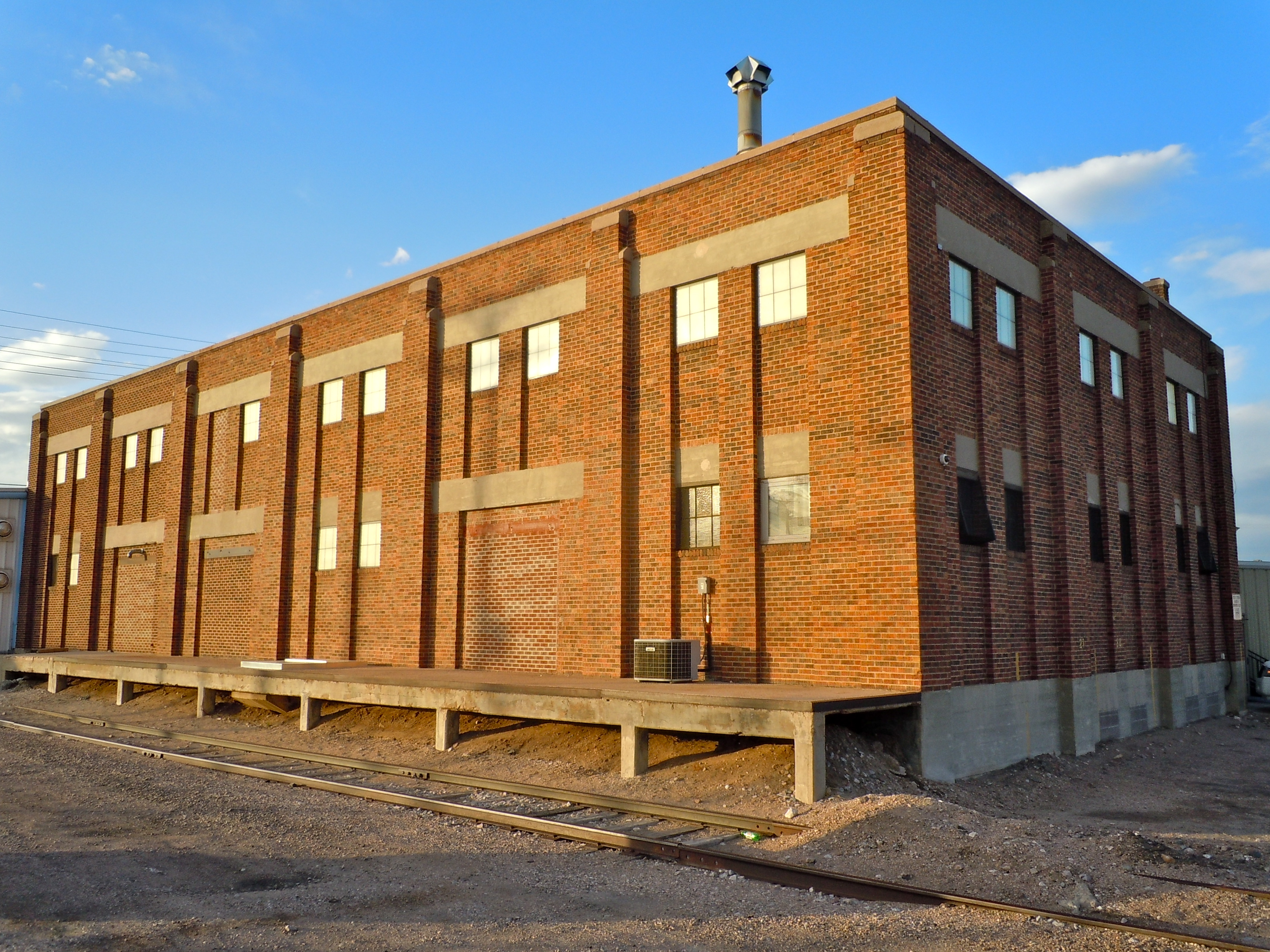
Wyoming Fuel Company warehouse, Cheyenne, Wyoming, 1929 and 1937

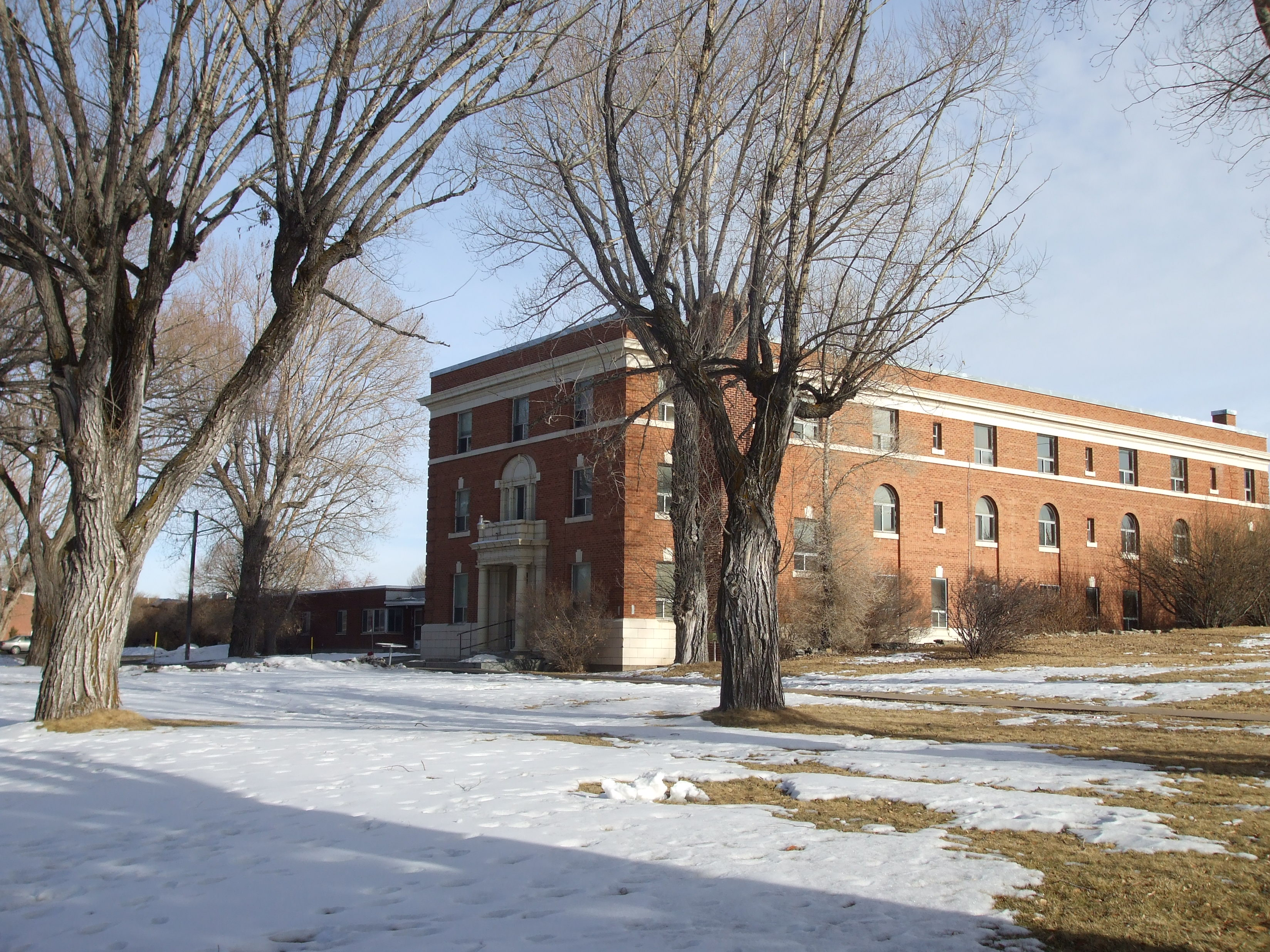
Clark Hall, Wyoming State Hospital, Evanston, Wyoming, 1930

William Goodale house, Laramie, Wyoming, 1931
