= Churchill Public School (Cheyenne, Wyoming) =

- U.S. National Register of Historic Places
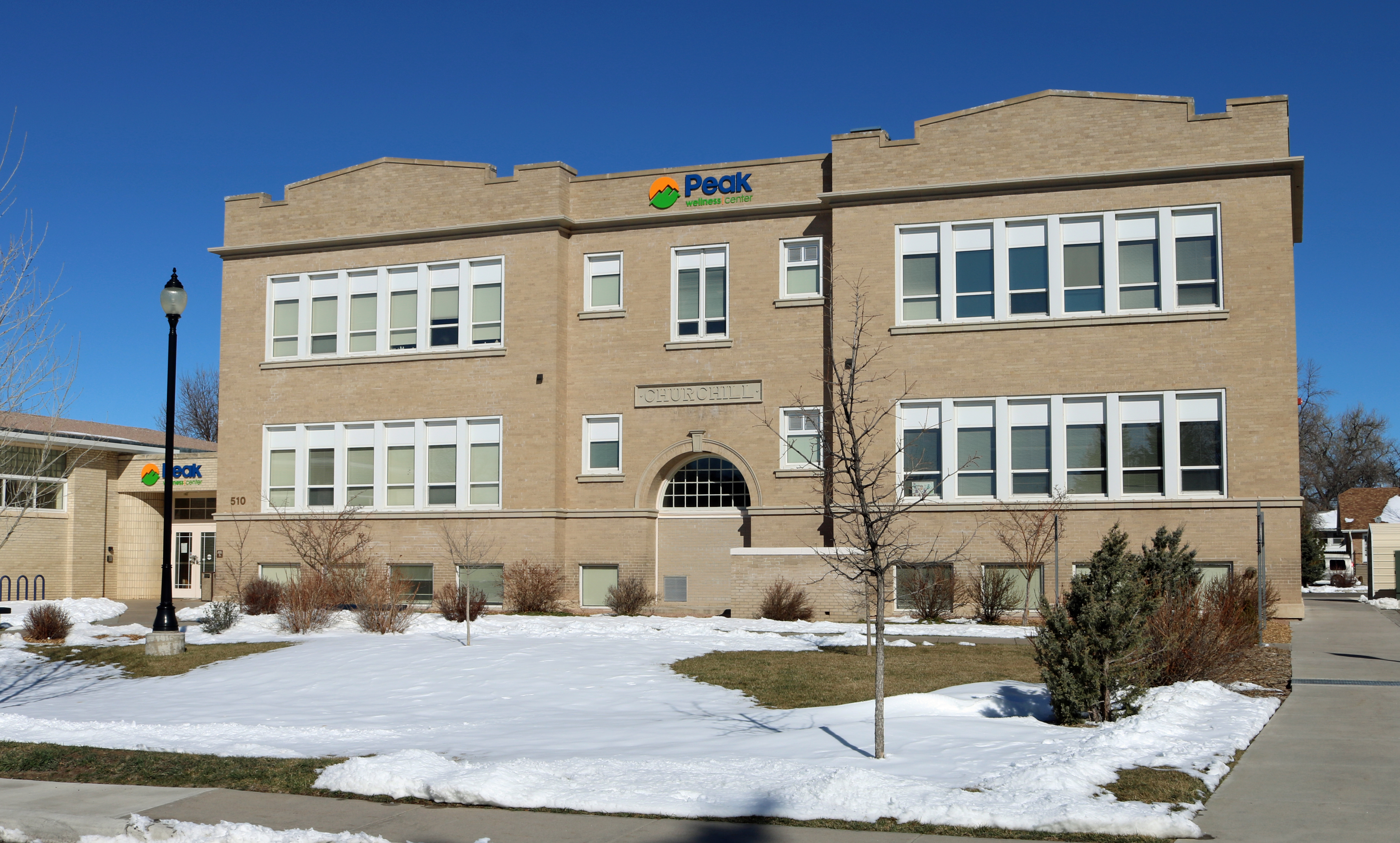
- The school in 2015.

- Location within Wyoming Location within the United States
- Location: 510 W. 29th St., Cheyenne, Wyoming
- Coordinates: 41°8′35″N 104°49′36″W
- Area: 1.6 acres (0.65 ha)
- Built: 1911
- Architect: William Dubois
- Architectural style: Prairie School, American Foursquare
- MPS: Public Schools in Cheyenne, Wyoming MPS
- NRHP reference No.: 05000704
- Added to NRHP: August 22, 2005

The Churchill Public School, also known as Churchill Elementary School, is a historic school located in Cheyenne, Wyoming, USA. Built in 1911, it is the oldest surviving public school in Cheyenne. The school is named for James Otis Churchill, Cheyenne's superintendent of schools for nearly two decades. The prominent Cheyenne architect William Dubois gave the school a Prairie design with an American Foursquare plan. It was the first of several schools designed by Dubois in Cheyenne. The two-story brick building has a stepped parapet along its flat roof.

The school was listed on the National Register of Historic Places in 2005.
