= Charles L. Beatty House =

- U.S. National Register of Historic Places
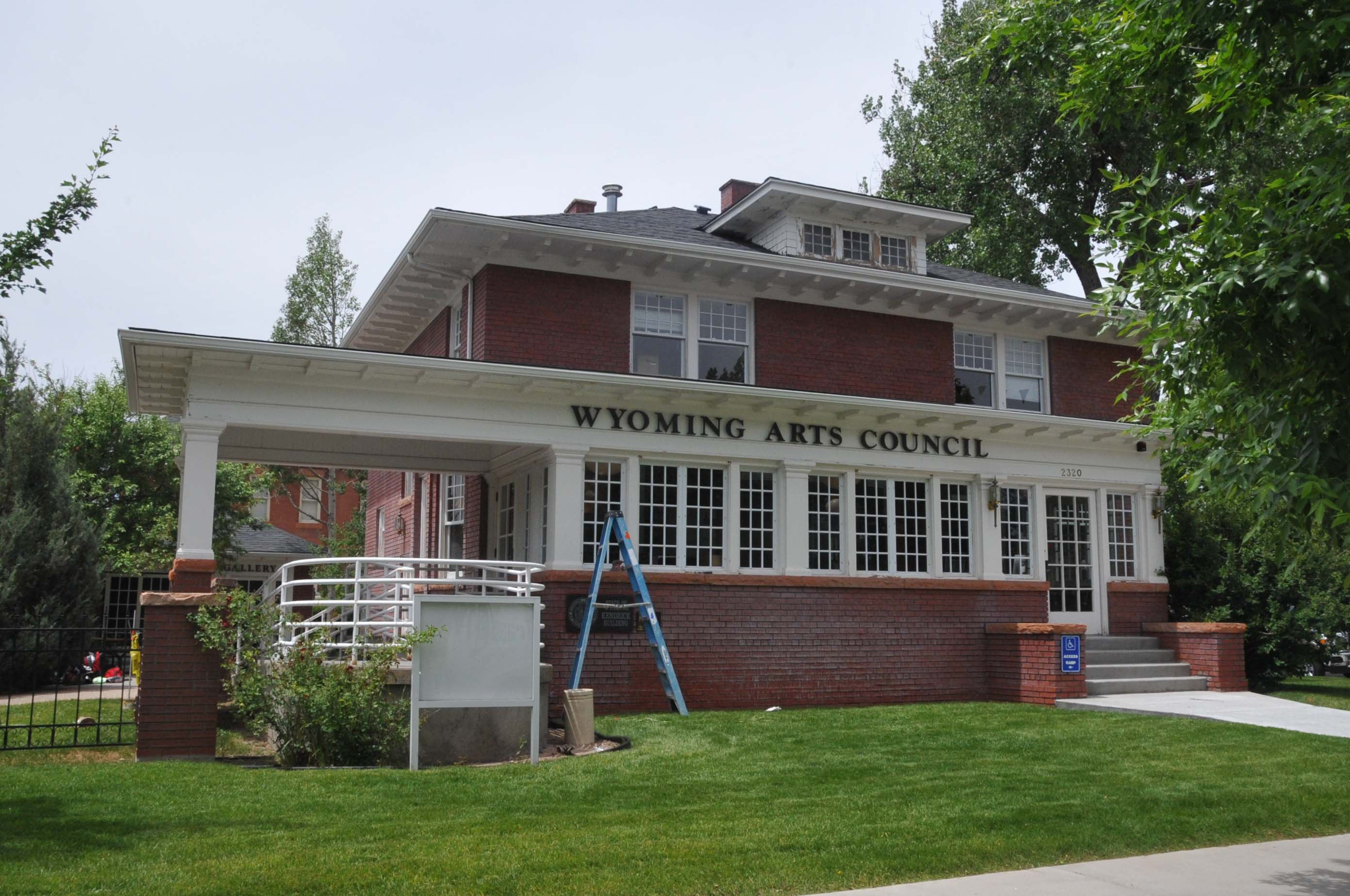
- Kendrick Building in 2013

- Location within Wyoming Location within the United States
- Location: 2320 Capitol Ave., Cheyenne, Wyoming
- Coordinates: 41°8′21″N 104°49′10″W
- Area: 0.3 acres (0.12 ha)
- Built: 1916
- Architect: William Robert Dubois
- Architectural style: American Foursquare
- NRHP reference No.: 90001001
- Added to NRHP: June 28, 1990

The Charles L. Beatty House, also known as the Kendrick Building, on Capitol Avenue in Cheyenne, Wyoming, was built in 1916. It was listed on the National Register of Historic Places in 1990.

It is an American Foursquare house designed by architect William Robert Dubois.

The listing included two contributing buildings.

It is located across from the Wyoming State Capitol. The building was the home of the Wyoming Arts Council for two decades, until January 2015, when WAC moved to the Barrett Building, co-locating with the Wyoming State Museum.
