= Wyoming Fuel Company =

- U.S. National Register of Historic Places
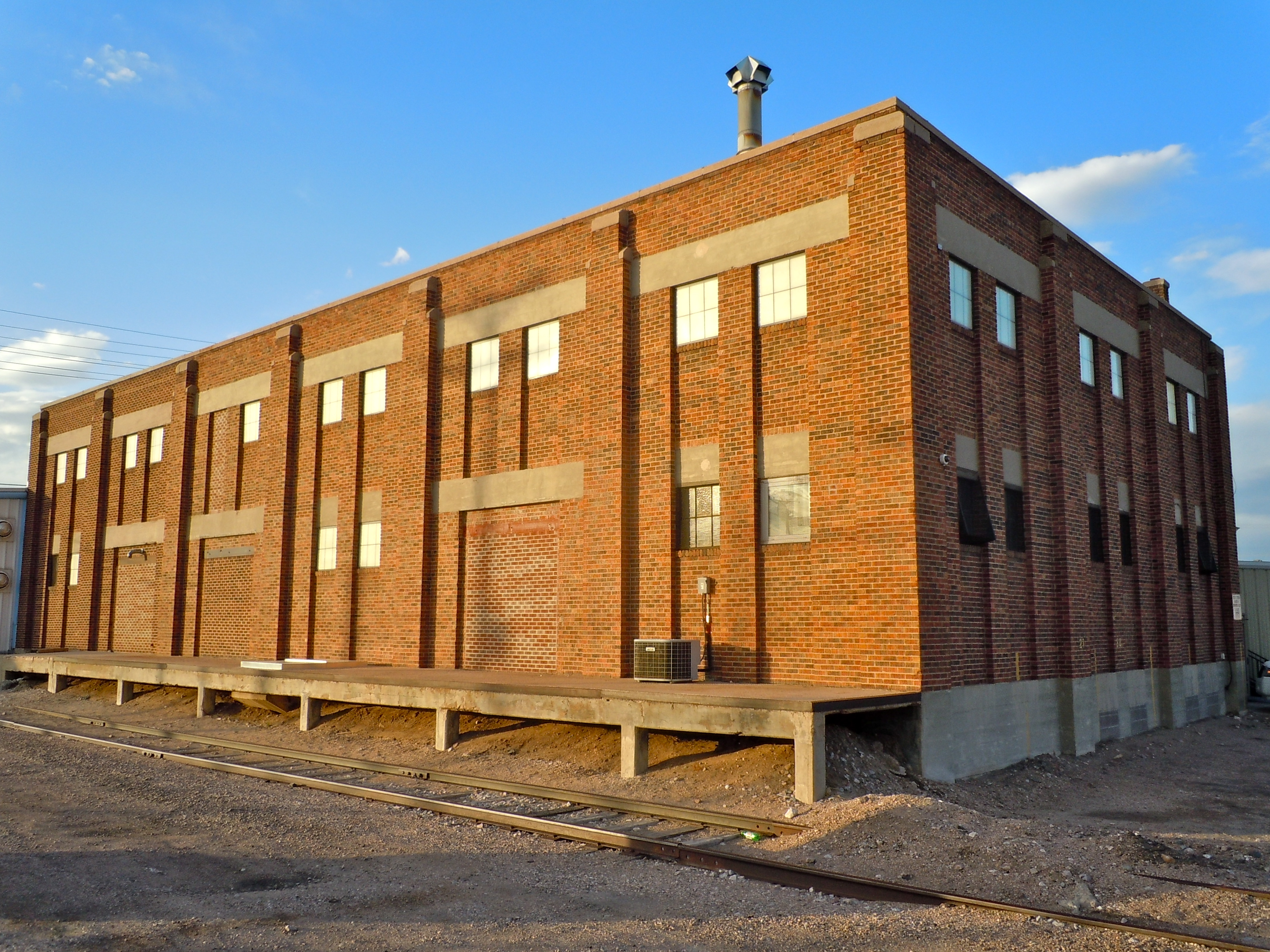

- Location within Wyoming Location within the United States
- Location: 720 W. 18th St., Cheyenne, Wyoming
- Coordinates: 41°7′57″N 104°49′21″W
- Area: less than one acre
- Built: 1929, 1937
- Architect: William Dubois
- Architectural style: Early Commercial
- MPS: Industrial Facilities Served by Railroad in Cheyenne, Wyoming MPS
- NRHP reference No.: 03001029
- Added to NRHP: October 13, 2003

Wyoming Fuel Company, an Early Commercial-style warehouse at 720 W. 18th St. in Cheyenne, Wyoming, was built in 1929, with an addition added in 1937. It was listed on the National Register of Historic Places in 2003.

It was designed by William Dubois. It is a two-story, flat-roofed brick masonry building whose 1929 portion is 53 by 105 feet (16 m × 32 m) in plan; the northern addition is 53 by 35 feet (16 m × 11 m); it gives the appearance of a single unified building although the two parts do not communicate.
