= Elgin Symphony Orchestra =

Orchestra from Illinois, United States

Elgin Symphony Orchestra (ESO)
- Orchestra
- Founded: 1950
- Concert hall: The Hemmens
- Music director: Douglas Steensland 1950-1971; Margaret Hillis 1971-1985; Robert Hanson 1985-2011; Andrew Grams 2013-2023 Chad Goodman 2023-present
- Website: www.elginsymphony.org

The Elgin Symphony Orchestra is a regional orchestra founded and headquartered in Elgin, Illinois. Its music director is Chad Goodman, former conducting fellow of the New World Symphony in Miami Beach, Florida. The orchestra's season includes some 40 performances annually (classics, pops, educational programming, and holiday performances) at the 1,200-seat Hemmens Cultural Center in Elgin and various locations in the greater Elgin area.

The Elgin Symphony Orchestra is committed to giving back to the community through its Adopt-a-School program that provides supplemental music education and in-school performances to local schools; Musicians Care program that brings live music performances to local hospitals, hospices, and retirement homes; informational Listener's Club events and other free programs at public libraries; In Harmony Program in places of worship; Ainsworth Concerts for Youth; and free community concerts throughout the region.

== History ==
The Elgin Symphony Orchestra was founded in 1950 by Douglas Steensland at Elgin Community College. In 1971, with the appointment of Grammy Award-winning conductor Margaret Hillis as music director, the orchestra's artistic growth advanced significantly. Conductor/composer Robert Hanson was appointed the orchestra's associate conductor in 1974 and co-music director with Hillis in 1983. Hanson became music director in 1985, and the orchestra achieved an artistic and service growth described by the Chicago Tribune as “impressive.” In 1985 the orchestra became a fully professional ensemble. In 1988, 1999, 2005 and 2016, the Elgin Symphony Orchestra was named Orchestra of the Year by the Illinois Council of Orchestras. The orchestra is the first four-time winner of the award recognizing programming excellence, artistic quality and leadership.

In 2011 Hanson stepped down as music director. Following a two-year search, the orchestra on June 12, 2013, announced the appointment of Andrew Grams as its next music director. Grams, who was named conductor of the Year by the Illinois Council of Orchestras in 2015, served the Elgin Symphony Orchestra until 2021. Following a two-year, international search, Chad Goodman was named the ESO's fifth music director in May 2023.

Isabella Lippi has been the orchestra's concertmaster since 2004. Lippi was inducted into the Fox Valley Arts Hall of Fame in 2024.

In 1996, the Elgin Symphony Orchestra moved its administrative and box offices from Elgin Community College, the orchestra's home for nearly 50 years, to downtown Elgin. In 1997, the Elgin Symphony Orchestra began broadcasting its Classic Series concerts on WFMT 98.7-FM, Chicago's fine arts station; performances are available on WFMT’s cable network in 38 states, and throughout the world on the Internet. Over the years the Elgin Symphony Orchestra has engaged world-renowned musicians including Benny Goodman, Yo-Yo Ma, Sir James Galway, Itzhak Perlman, Pinchas Zukerman, Janos Starker, Pepe Romero, Midori Goto, Rachel Barton Pine, Kathleen Battle, Jennifer Koh, Alisa Weilerstein, Nicola Benedetti, Jaime Laredo, and Lynn Harrell, and rising musicians and vocalists such as Randall Goosby, Ryan Speedo Green, Albert Cano Smit, and Thomas Mesa.

Notable guest conductors include Giancarlo Guerrero, Rossen Milanov, and Ignat Solzhenitsyn.

The symphony began its Holiday Showcase at the Sears Centre arena in 2006 which became an annual event for three years bringing in hosts such as Jodi Benson and Phantom of the Opera star, Doug LaBrecque. It featured Cirque du Soleil aerialists and jugglers and Olympic ice skaters Melissa Gregory and Denis Petukhov.

The Planets Gala Concert with Leonard Nimoy was one of the symphony's high-profile events. It featured the Elgin Children's Chorus and had NASA visuals of the cosmos projected over the stage of The Hemmens Cultural Center while Leonard Nimoy narrated.

In 2008, the orchestra released its first commercially recorded album on the Naxos label featuring music by Aaron Copland including the Piano Concerto with soloist Benjamin Pasternack and a suite from Copland's opera The Tender Land.

In 2011, the Elgin Master Chorale held a performance in collaboration with the ESO, which it named A Concert of Remembrance, in memory of the September 11 attacks. It performed John Adams' On the Transmigration of Souls and Brahms' A German Requiem.

On May 20, 2023, the ESO, in collaboration with JCC Chicago and the Gail Borden Public Library, presented a concert featuring instruments from the Violins of Hope collection.

== Performing Season ==
Information on ESO concerts and events is available at: http://www.ElginSymphony.Org
