= Jenne Lennon =

Scottish singer

- Occupations: Singer, songwriter
- Years active: present
- Website: jennelennon.com

Jenne Lennon is a Celtic singer. In 2012, she received the Distinguished Alumni Award from the Elgin Children's Chorus. Jenne has performed all over the United States and Europe headlining events such as the Festival Interceltique de Lorient in France, the Bergen Music Festival in Norway, and the Unity Temple in the United States. She has worked and recorded with the likes of Emmy nominated composer Sarah Class, the Elgin Children's Chorus, Global Voices, the Academy of Irish Music and Baal Tinne. Jenne is also a skilled Native American flute player and appeared in an episode of MTV' s Stand in performing with Sting.

She has contributed the original scores to adapted plays for Yeat's on Baile's Strand in 2010, Anhouill's Antigone and Steve Martin's Picasso at the Lapine Agile in 2011. Jenne teamed up with producer Roland Labana for The Hyde Park Players' An Evening of Horror and Suspense and Eugène Ionesco's Rhinoceros in 2012. Her original score was featured in the Hyde Park Community Players and the University of Chicago's Classics Department's modern re-telling of Shakespeare's Romeo and Juliet.

Her most recent work as an arranger, composer, and conductor was featured in the award-winning, critically acclaimed film A Million Miles Away, directed by Jennifer Reeder, and was featured at the Sundance Film Festival in 2014. The film's pivotal scene featuring the choral arrangement of a metal ballad was voted the "Top Music Moment in Film 2014" by Film Misery. Jenne teamed up again with Jennifer Reeder 's latest film, Blood Below The Skin, contributing the score and serving as music director, which has been nominated for the Teddy Award at the Berlinale Film Festival.

Jenne received a Bachelor of Arts degree in music performance from the University of Illinois at Chicago (UIC) in May 2006, where she was also awarded the Student Service Award for her outstanding service to the University and International Choral Music. During her career at UIC, she worked with top names in international music, including Dr. Mary Goetze of the International Vocal Ensemble (Indiana University) and creator of Global Voices; Dr. Michael J. Anderson of the International Federation for Choral Music; and African composer Sheesby Matiure. Jenne is currently pursuing her Master's degree in Vocal Pedagogy at Northeastern Illinois University. She is also a part of the international group Shishonnah with Liz Madden and Roland Labana.

== Filmography ==
=== Music department ===
Year	Title	Credited as	Notes
2014	A Million Miles Away	Composer: Theme Music	(Short)
2015	Blood Below the Skin	Musical Director	(Short)
