= Johnson Public School =

- U.S. National Register of Historic Places
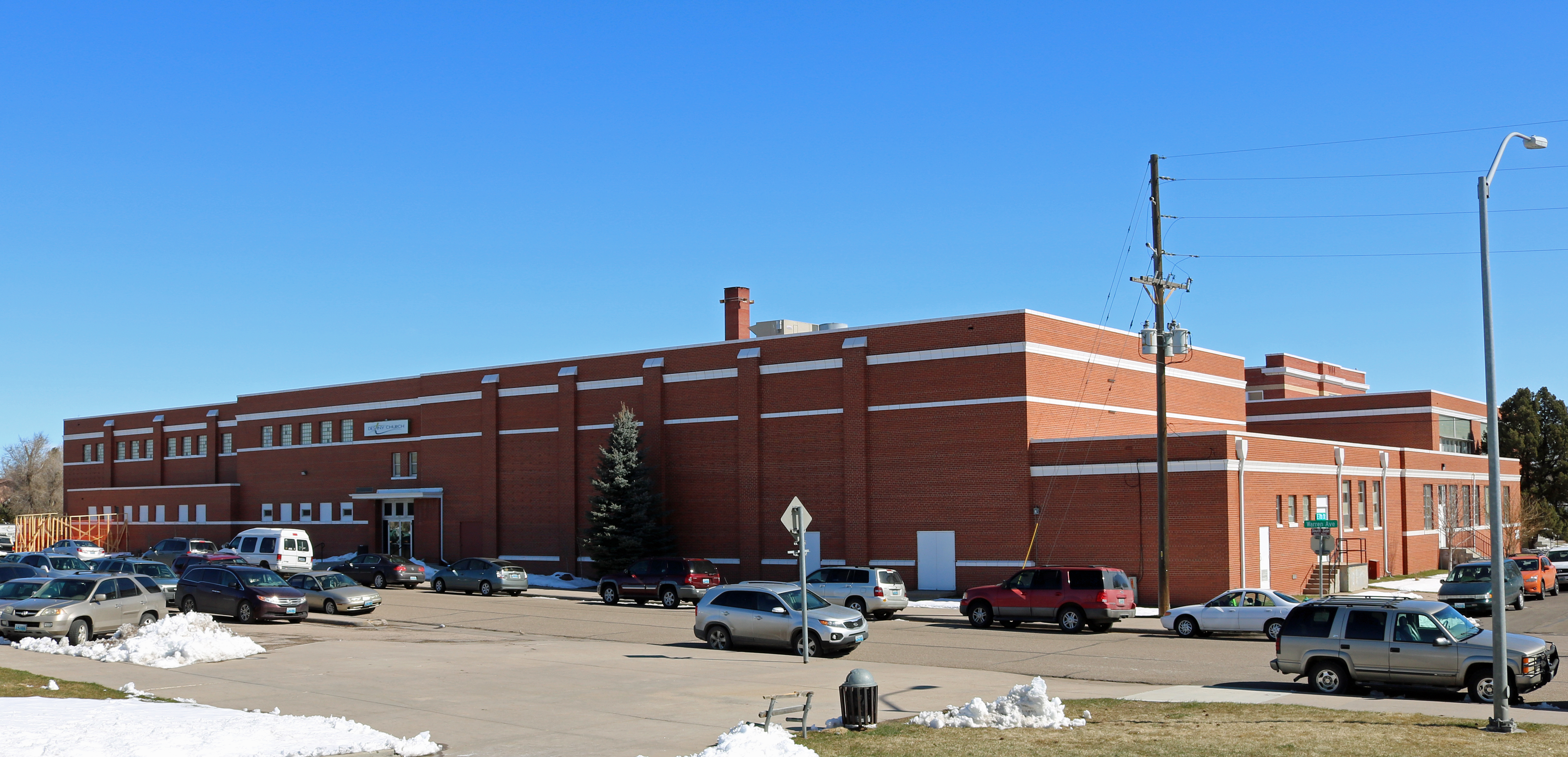
- Location: 711 Warren Ave., Cheyenne, Wyoming
- Coordinates: 41°07′34.3″N 104°48′28.4″W
- Area: 5.6 acres (2.3 ha)
- Built: 1923
- Built by: Adams and McCann
- Architect: William Dubois
- Architectural style: Collegiate Gothic
- MPS: Public Schools in Cheyenne, Wyoming MPS
- NRHP reference No.: 05000706
- Added to NRHP: August 22, 2005

The Johnson Public School, at 711 Warren Ave. in Cheyenne, Wyoming, was built in 1923. It was listed on the National Register of Historic Places in 2005, at which time it was owned by the First Assembly of God Church.

It is a two-and-a-half-story red brick building on a concrete foundation with a "garden level" basement, and is styled in a "downscaled" version of Collegiate Gothic architecture designed by Cheyenne architect William Dubois. It is T-shaped in plan within a 280 by 250 feet (85 m × 76 m) rectangle: there is a 185 by 60 feet (56 m × 18 m) north–south segment and a 67 by 45 feet (20 m × 14 m) east–west segment. It has a flat roof and a brick parapet with terra cotta.
