= Morton Mansion (Douglas, Wyoming) =

- U.S. National Register of Historic Places
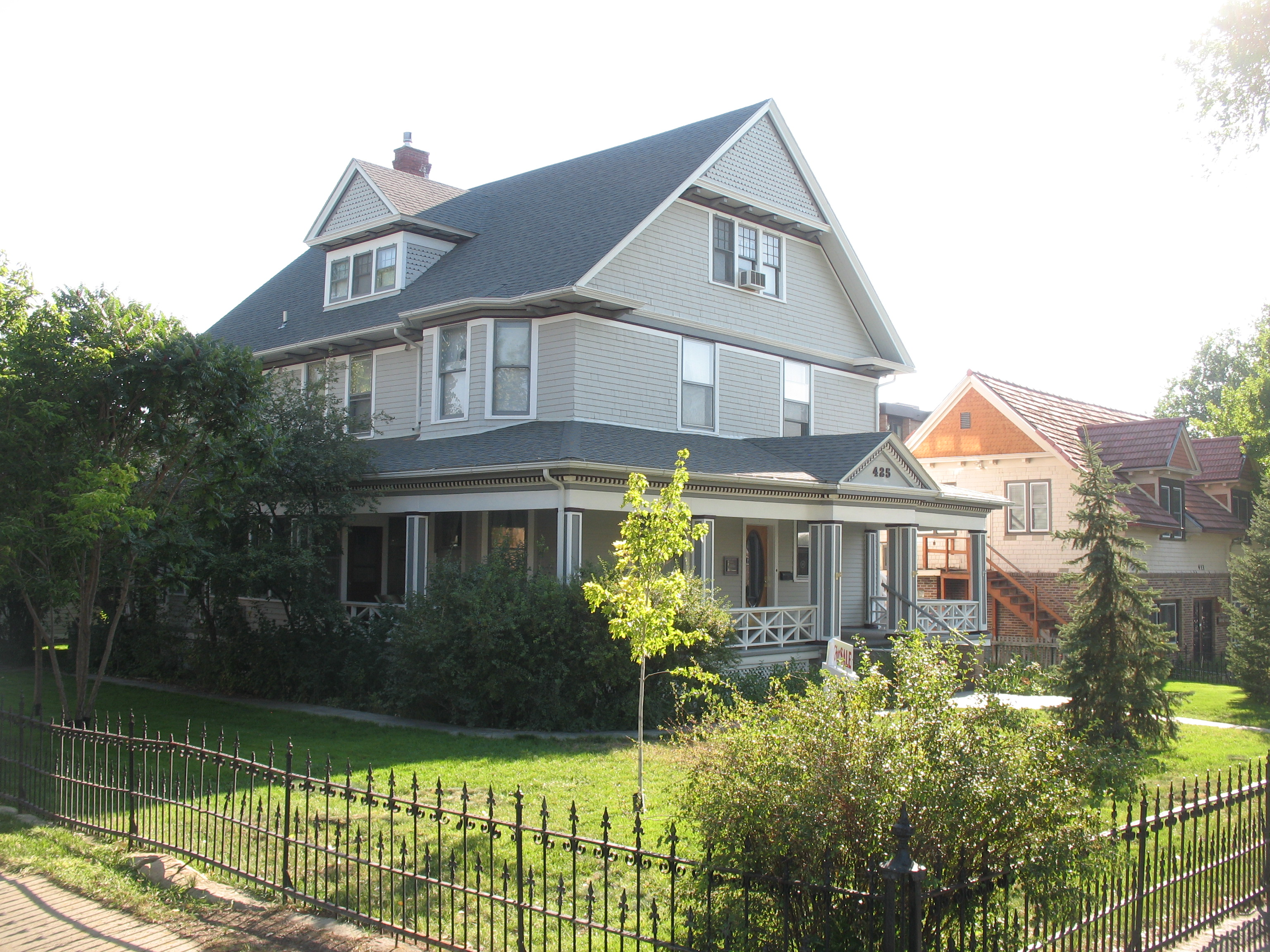
- Morton Mansion in 2012

- Location within Wyoming Location within the United States
- Location: 425 Center St., Douglas, Wyoming
- Coordinates: 42°45′33″N 105°22′51″W
- Area: less than one acre
- Built: 1903
- Built by: James Wells
- Architect: William DuBois
- NRHP reference No.: 00001644
- Added to NRHP: January 11, 2001

The Morton Mansion was built in 1903 in Douglas, Wyoming for the family of John Morton. Morton was a sheep rancher who also served as an elected official, banker and civic leader in Douglas. The house was designed by Wyoming architect William DuBois.

== History ==
John Morton was born John M. Jenne in Germany and emigrated to the United States with his parents in 1867, settling in DeKalb, Illinois. He enlisted in the U.S. Army at Fort Leavenworth, Kansas, but deserted after an incident with an officer and changed his name to Morton. For a while he worked around the gold mines of Cripple Creek, Colorado, then went to Wyoming where he established a sheep ranch about 1891. Almost immediately he became the largest owner of livestock in central Wyoming, working together with his brother Jacob Jenne to operate the Morton-Jenne Sheep Company. The Morton Ranch grew to be the largest ranch in Converse County.

Morton married Sarah McDermott in 1894. They had five children, and Morton commissioned DuBois to design a house in Douglas for the family. The house was built by James Wells and completed in 1903. After moving into town Morton became a director of the First National Bank of Douglas and other businesses. He was elected mayor of Douglas in 1910 and represented Converse County in the Wyoming legislature. Morton died in 1916 and his wife and family assumed control of what became Mortons, Inc. The family retained the house until Sarah's death in 1952. After a time as a home for troubled youth the house returned to residential use and was renovated in the 1990s.

== Description ==
The Morton Mansion is a 2-1/2 story frame house with a porch on two sides and a variety of projecting bays. It is capped with a steeply-sloping shingled roof over a full attic. The porch railing adds to the design with a pattern of diamond cross-bracing. Window vary, with a variety of muntin patterns. Some of the first floor windows feature stained glass transoms. The property is enclosed with an ornate cast-iron fence at the edges of the double lot.

The Morton Mansion was placed on the National Register of Historic Places on January 11, 2001.

== See also ==
Jenne Block, a commercial building in Douglas built for Jacob Jenne
