= Cheyenne High School (Cheyenne, Wyoming) =

- U.S. National Register of Historic Places
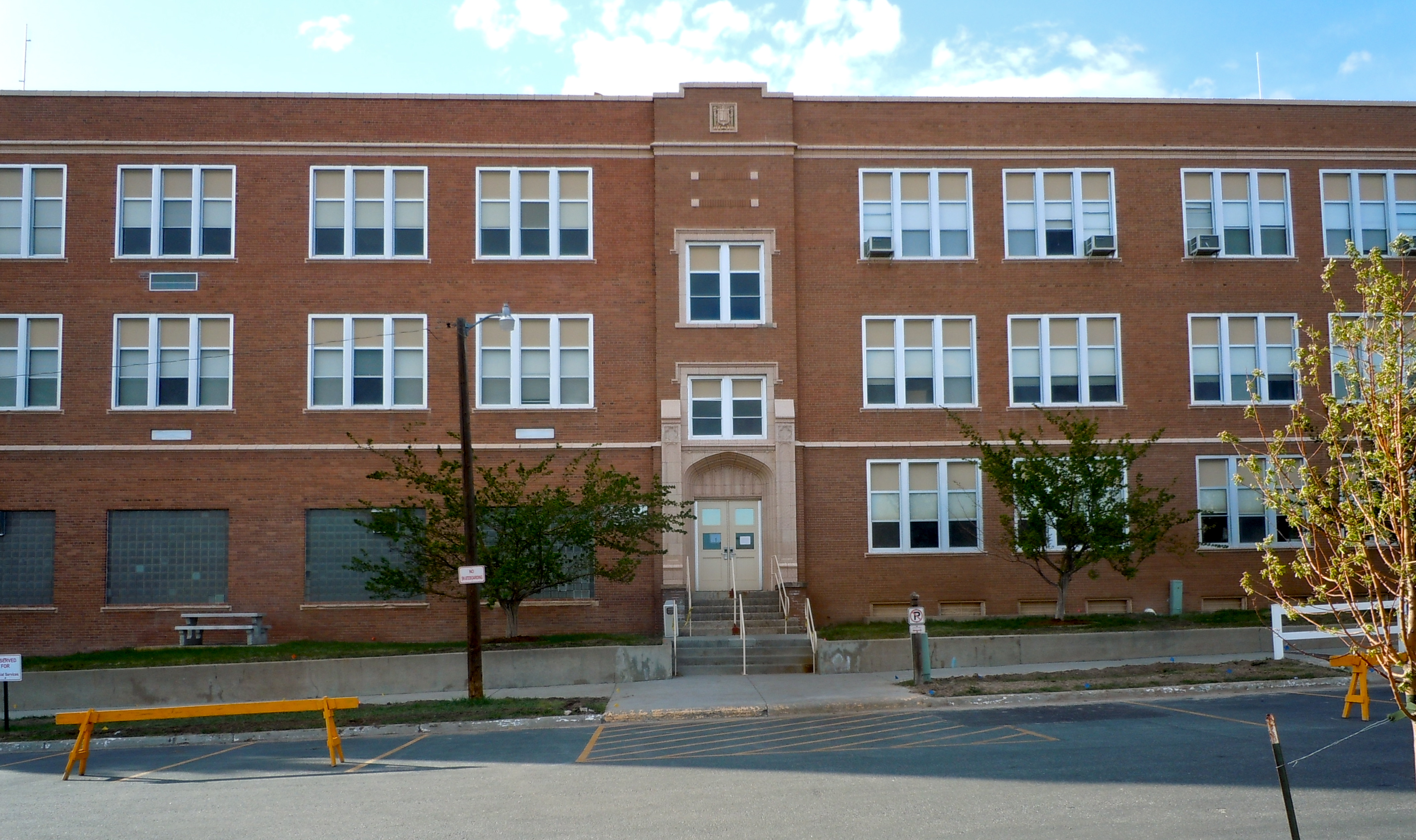

- Location within Wyoming Location within the United States
- Location: 2810 House Ave., Cheyenne, Wyoming
- Coordinates: 41°8′41″N 104°49′9″W
- Area: 2.8 acres (1.1 ha)
- Built: 1921
- Built by: John W. Howard
- Architect: William Dubois
- Architectural style: Late Gothic Revival
- MPS: Public Schools in Cheyenne, Wyoming MPS
- NRHP reference No.: 05000698
- Added to NRHP: August 22, 2005

The Cheyenne High School at 2810 House Avenue in Cheyenne, Wyoming is a Late Gothic Revival-style building which was built in 1921. It has also been known as Central High School and as Laramie County School District No.1 Administration Building and was listed on the National Register of Historic Places in 2005.

It is a three-story Collegiate Gothic style building which is 250 by 220 feet (76 m × 67 m) in plan. Its walls are reinforced concrete with brick faces. It was designed by architect William Dubois and built by contractor John W. Howard.

The school district served was eventually split up. See Cheyenne Central High School, Cheyenne East High School, and Cheyenne South High School.
