= City and County Building (Cheyenne, Wyoming) =

- U.S. National Register of Historic Places
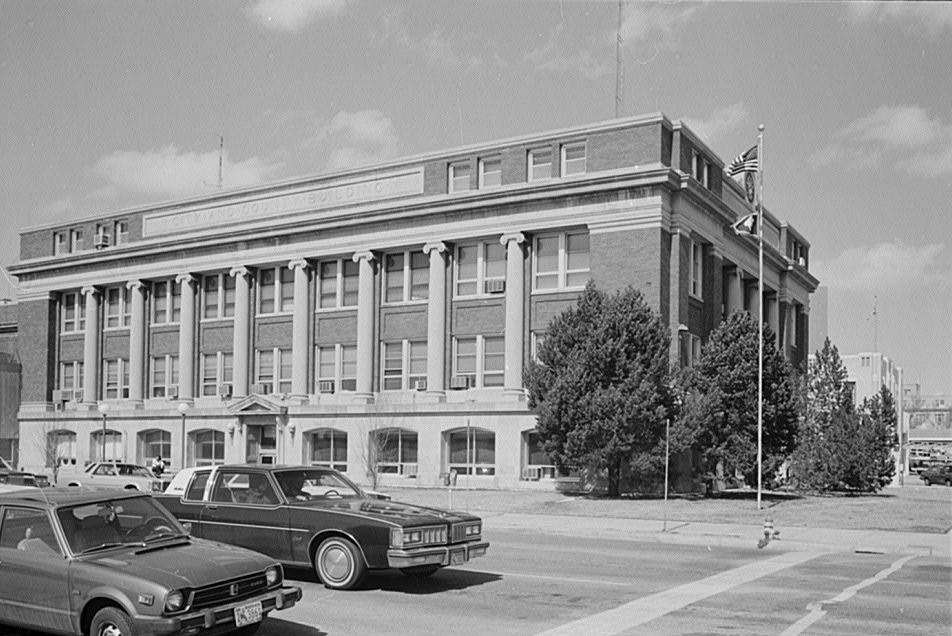

- Location within Wyoming Location within the United States
- Location: 19th St. and Carey Ave., Cheyenne, Wyoming
- Coordinates: 41°8′6″N 104°49′6″W
- Area: less than one acre
- Built: 1917-19
- Built by: Howard, John W.
- Architect: Dubois, William
- Architectural style: Classical Revival
- NRHP reference No.: 78002828
- Added to NRHP: November 30, 1978

The City and County Building, also known as the City-County Building, at 19th St. and Carey Ave. in Cheyenne, Wyoming, was built during 1917–1919. It was designed by architect William Dubois in Classical Revival style.

It was listed on the National Register of Historic Places in 1978. It was deemed significant for association with the Laramie County government and the City of Cheyenne governments' development, as well as "for the quality of its craftsmanship and detailing." It combined city hall and courthouse functions and originally held 14 county and six city offices, besides courts.
