= Kees Klompenhouwer =

Dutch diplomat

Kees Jan René Klompenhouwer
- Born: 6 June 1954 (age 72); Le Sentier, Switzerland
- Occupation: Diplomat
- Spouse: Joosje Brouwer

Kees Jan René Klompenhouwer (born 6 June 1954) is a Dutch diplomat. He was Ambassador of the Netherlands to the Czech Republic until May 2021.

== Education ==
Kees Klompenhouwer obtained an MA Economics in 1979, at Erasmus University Rotterdam.

== Career ==
- 1/5/2008 - EU Civilian Operations Commander and Director of the Civilian Planning and Conduct Capability (CPCC)
- 2006-2008 Director East- and South Eastern Europe Department Ministry of Foreign Affaires, The Hague
- 2002-2006 Director for Foreign Intelligence, General Intelligence and Security Service (AIVD)
- 1999-2002 Ambassador Extraordinary and Plenipotentiairy to Serbia, Belgrade
- 1995-1999 Defense Counsellor, Netherlands Permanent Mission to NATO, Brussels
- 1992-1995 Head Military Cooperation Section, Ministry of Foreign Affairs, The Hague
- 1987-1992 First Secretary at the Netherlands Permanent Mission to the United Nations in Geneva
- 1983-1987 Policy Officer European Union Department, Ministry of Foreign Affairs, The Hague
- 1980-1983 United Nations Department, Ministry of Foreign Affairs, The Hague
- 1979-1980 Lecturer in economics for students from developing countries, Research Institute for Management Science, Delft

== Family ==
Kees Klompenhouwer is married and has three children. His wife, Joosje Brouwer, is a Russian-Dutch/Dutch-Russian translator; she's also a musician (classical guitar teacher), she has graduated from ITV Hogeschool voor Tolken en Vertalen University in Utrecht.
