= Elgin Children's Chorus =

Children's choir program in Elgin, Illinois, US

- Formation: 1986
- Dissolved: 2015
- Type: Youth organization
- Legal status: Non-profit organization
- Headquarters: Elgin, Illinois
- Co-founders: Jay Kellner; Kay Paulson
- Website: elginchildrenschorus.org

The Elgin Children's Chorus is an after-school choir program in Elgin, Illinois for children ages seven to sixteen. It was co-founded by Jay Kellner and Kay Paulson and was originally made up of 45 singers from Kimball, Larson, and Ellis Middle Schools. Now they meet at Elgin Community College and have almost 100 children in the program. The Elgin Children's Chorus has traveled to Europe several times, and they perform with groups like the Elgin Symphony Orchestra, Elgin Choral Union, and Heartland Voices. It was announced on November 9, 2015 via Facebook that the chorus will be ceasing operations after the December 2015 concert after 30 years.

== Choirs ==
The Elgin Children's Chorus was made up of five choirs all requiring auditioning. The Treble Choir was the first level and the Intermezzo Choir was the second. The Concert Choir was the third and largest. If reached, you had the option to tour. The very top choir, the Chamber Choir, was a small selection of students which also attended the Concert Choir. There was also a Boys' Ensemble which incorporated all of the boys in the chorus.

== Notable performances ==
- (1986) Carl Orff's Carmina Burana with the Elgin Choral Union and Elgin Symphony Orchestra
- (1994) The national tour production of Joseph and the Amazing Technicolor Dreamcoat with Donny Osmond at the Chicago Theatre
- Chicago Cubs game performing "Take Me Out To The Ball Game" at Wrigley Field
- (1999) Carnegie Hall
- (2004) Vienna Boys Choir
- (2008) The Planets Gala Concert with Leonard Nimoy

== Tours ==
- England Tour
- (2004) Vienna Tour
- (2008) France Tour
- (2011) New York and Washington D.C. Tour
- (2013) Hawaii Tour
