= Robert Hanson (director) =

American conductor and composer (born 1946)

- Born: Robert Hanson; August 18, 1946 (age 79); Hills, Minnesota, United States
- Education: Augustana University
- Alma mater: Chicago Conservatory of Music; Northwestern University
- Occupations: Orchestra director, composer
- Years active: 1974–2011
- Spouse: Linda Nelson (m. 1968)
- Children: Jessica Hanson; Alicia Hanson; Britt Hanson

Robert Hanson (born August 18, 1946) is an American conductor and composer known for his 37 years with the Elgin Symphony Orchestra which was named “Orchestra of the Year” three times by the Illinois Council of Orchestras and won the 2010 Elgin Image Award. In July 2011, he resigned. John von Rhein, music critic of the Chicago Tribune, named Hanson the 2003 Chicagoan of the Year.
