= Jenne Block =

- U.S. National Register of Historic Places
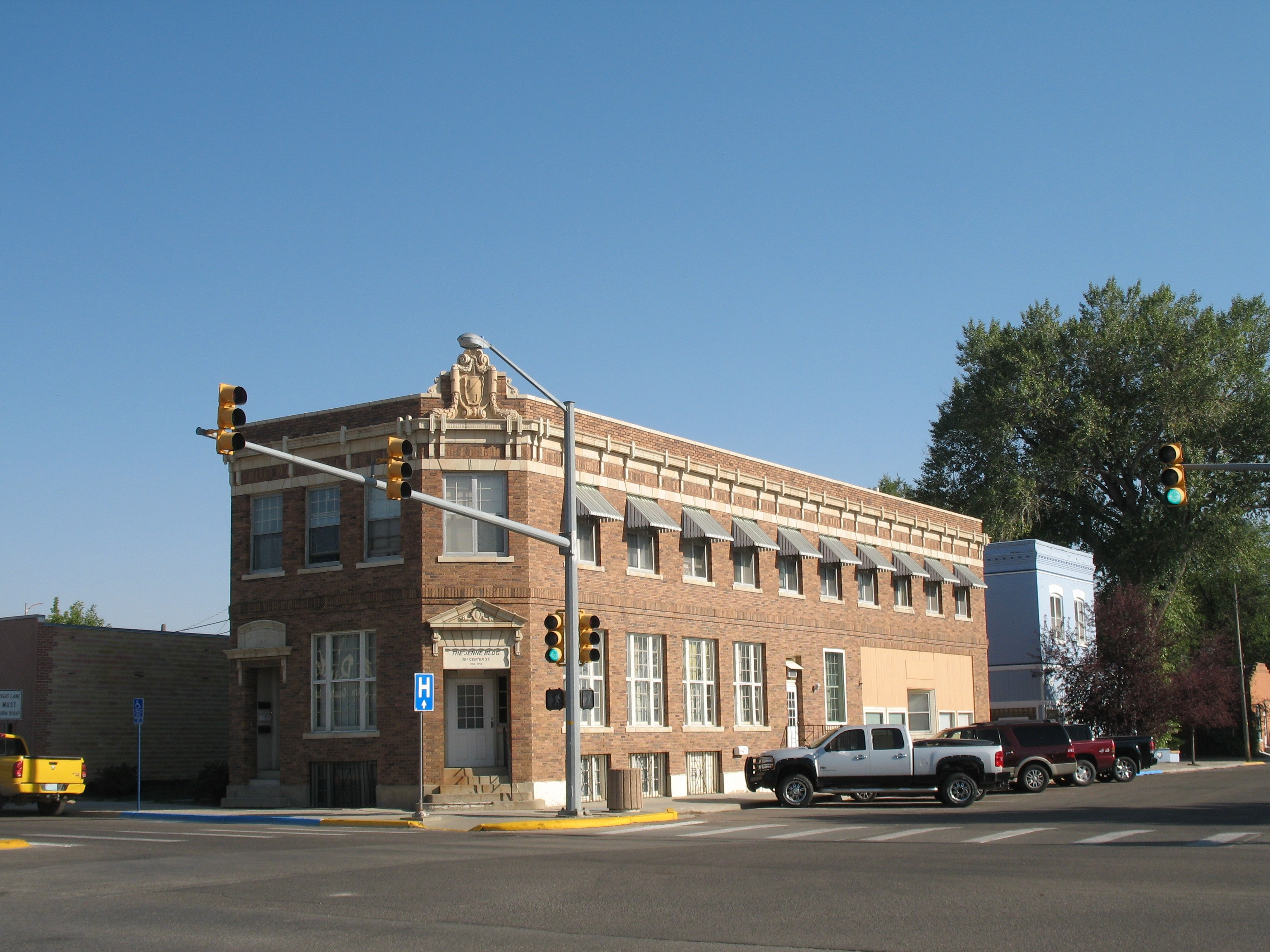
- Jenne Block in 2012

- Location within Wyoming Location within the United States
- Location: 301 Center St., Douglas, Wyoming
- Coordinates: 42°45′33″N 105°22′59″W
- Area: less than one acre
- Built: 1916
- Built by: Edward A. Reavill
- Architectural style: Early Commercial
- NRHP reference No.: 97001600
- Added to NRHP: January 6, 1998

The Jenne Block is a two-story brick commercial building in downtown Douglas, Wyoming. It is described as the most ornate commercial building in Douglas, with extensive terra cotta detailing. It was built for rancher and businessman Jacob Jenne by contractor Edward A. Reavill in 1916. The building housed a bank and the local Douglas Enterprise newspaper, as well as professional offices.

== Description ==
The rectangular building measures 100 feet (30 m) long by 26 feet (7.9 m) wide. The corner entrance is set at an angle to face the Center and South Third Streets intersection and is topped by a terra cotta crest with a JJ monogram. A raised entry at the middle of the long side provides access to the upper floors, with a basement stair set underneath. The elevations that do not face the street are blank expanses of brick.

Jenne Block was listed on the National Register of Historic Places on January 6, 1998.

== See also ==
Morton Mansion (Douglas, Wyoming), built for Jacob Jenne's brother John (Jenne) Morton in Douglas
