= Second Battle of Jenné =

Date	April 11, 1893 to April 12, 1893
Location	Djenne, Mali
Result	French Victory: End of Tukulor Empire

Belligerents
(France) French Third Republic	Tukulor Empire

Commanders and leaders
Lieutenant Colonel Louis Archinard	Almami Ahmadu Tall

Casualties and losses
15 men KIA; 2 officers KIA	Substantial

The Second Battle of Jenné was a military engagement between the armies of the Tukulor Empire and the French Third Republic. It was the last major battle in the Franco-Tukulor Wars. The French won a decisive victory, forcing Ahmadu Tall to flee to the Sokoto Caliphate in what is now Nigeria. The already waning Tukulor Empire fell apart as a result.

== See also ==
- First Battle of Jenné
- Tukulor Empire
- History of Mali

== Sources ==
- Lewis, David Levering (2001). Race to Fashoda. New York: Macmillan. pp. 336 Pages. ISBN 0-8050-7119-9.
