= First Battle of Jenné =

Date	February 24, 1891
Location	Djenne, Mali
Result	French victory: Tukulor withdrawal from Inner Niger

Belligerents
(France) French Third Republic	Tukulor Empire

Commanders and leaders
Louis Archinard	Ahmadu Tall

The First Battle of Jenné was a military engagement between the armies of the Tukulor Empire and the French Third Republic. French forces under the command of Lieutenant Colonel Louis Archinard seized the capital of Ahmadu Tall on the Bani River. The engagement was hard-fought and the results uncertain “until the last hour” according to French sources. Almami Ahmadu was forced to withdraw, and Umar Tall’s son Agibu was placed on the throne as a puppet ruler.

== See also ==
- Second Battle of Jenné
- Tukulor Empire
- History of Mali

== Sources ==
- Lewis, David Levering (2001). Race to Fashoda. New York: Macmillan. pp. 336 Pages. ISBN 0-8050-7119-9.
