= The Hemmens Cultural Center =

Coordinates: 42.03964°N 88.28692°W

- Interactive map of The Hemmens Cultural Center
- Location: 45 Symphony Way; Elgin, Illinois 60120

The Hemmens Cultural Center is a 1,200-seat theatre in Elgin, Illinois, United States. It is the home of the Elgin Symphony Orchestra.
