= Jennes de Mol =

Dutch diplomat

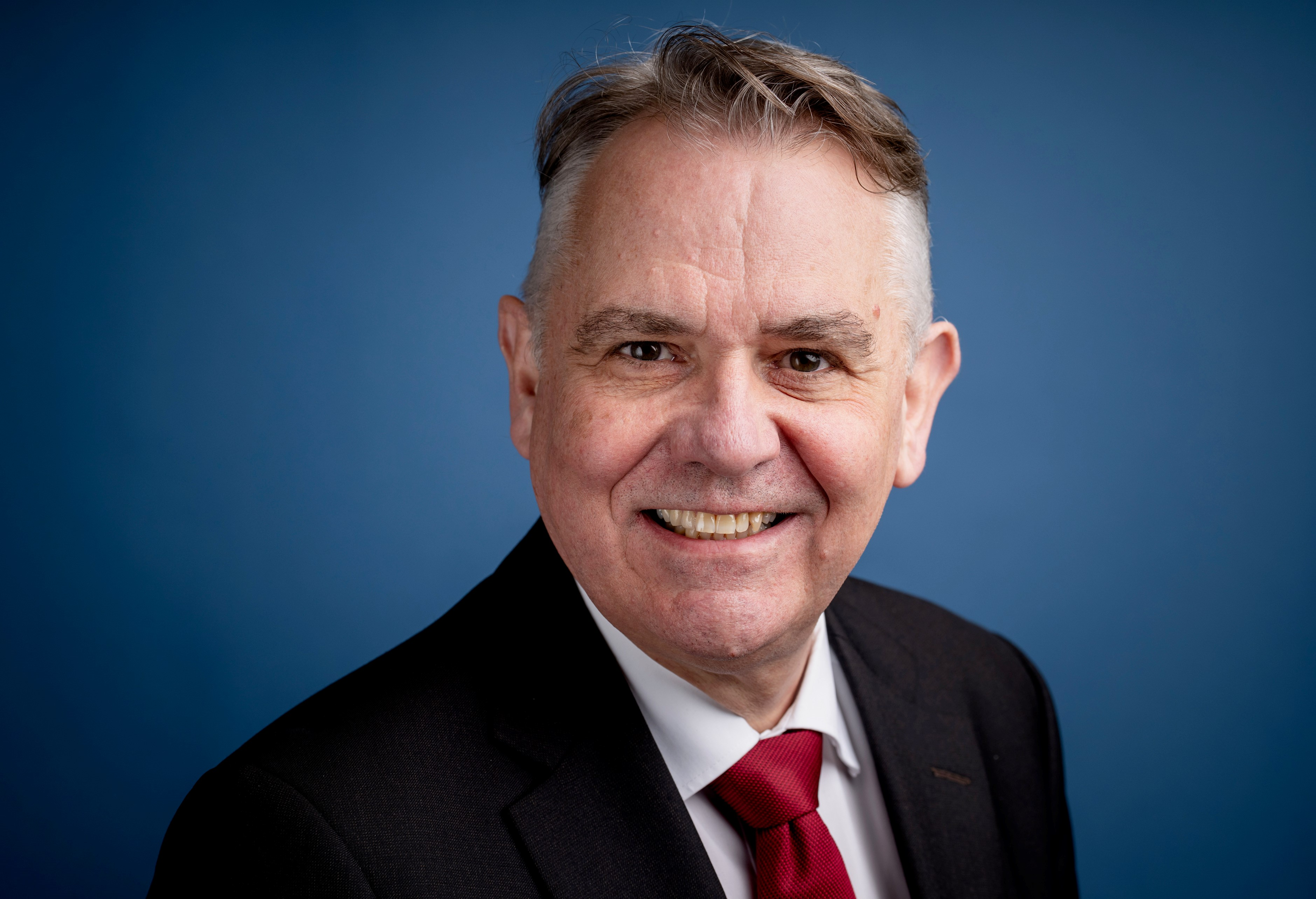
- Born: Johannes Hermann Adrianus Cornelis de Mol; 12 August 1963 (age 63); Eindhoven
- Occupation: Ambassador

Johannes Hermann Adrianus Cornelis (Jennes) de Mol (born August 12, 1963 in Eindhoven) is a Dutch diplomat. He is the current Ambassador of the Kingdom of the Netherlands to Poland, also accredited to Belarus.

== Personal life and education ==
De Mol was born in Eindhoven, Noord-Brabant. He finished his pre-university education at Sint-Joriscollege in 1981.

De Mol graduated from Radboud University in Nijmegen in 1989 with a degree in Greek and Latin Languages and Culture, and a specialization in classical archaeology. In 1994, De Mol obtained a degree in Dutch law from Radboud University, with a specialization in International Private Law.

In the framework of his archaeological studies, De Mol published four articles on Roman wall painting in international journals. , and he completed an internship at the Centre d'Étude des Peintures Murales Romaines in Soissons. In 1986, De Mol had a six month scholarship at the Royal Netherlands Institute in Rome, and between 1984 and 1990, he participated in several archaeological field projects in Italy (Pompeii, Herculaneum, Valesio) and the Netherlands (Ulpia Noviomagus Batavorum).

Asides from Dutch, De Mol has proficiency in English, Russian, French, Ukrainian, German, Italian, Spanish and Polish.

De Mol supports football clubs PSV Eindhoven and FC Eindhoven. He takes an interest in beekeeping, Arabic language and culture, and cycling.

== Professional career ==
After an extended military service from 1990 tot 1992, De Mol completed the diplomatic service training program at the Netherlands Institute of International Relations Clingendael in 1993. At the Ministry of Foreign Affairs, he started as policy officer at the Africa directorate dealing with Tanzania from 1993 to 1995. From 1995 to 1999, he was second secretary at the Netherlands Embassy in Moscow, working on culture, education and scientific cooperation in Russia, Georgia and Armenia. He was involved in the Peter the Great Manifestation in 1997.

From 1999 to 2003, De Mol was first secretary at the Netherlands Permanent Representation to the UN and other international organizations in Geneva. Here, he was responsible for UN Conference for Trade and Development (UNCTAD) , International Trade Centre (ITC), UN Economic Commission for Europe (UNECE), and the World Intellectual Property Organisation (WIPO), as well as the Geneva-group on UN Financial and Human Resources Management.

From 2003 to 2005, De Mol was Personnnel and Management Advisor at the Dutch Ministry of Foreign Affairs, followed by Head of department for Personnel and Management Advice (2005–2008).

From 2008 tot 2011, De Mol was Deputy Head of Mission at the Netherlands Embassy in Prague, Czech Republic, responsible for EU and political affairs, including the coordination of the 2009 Czech EU Presidency. From 2010, he was Civilian Representative of the NATO Task Force VIII Uruzgan Afghanistan and director of the Provincial Reconstruction Team PRT 8 and 9. Together with Brigadier General Kees van den Heuvel, De Mol was responsible for the overall management of the Dutch-lead Task Force in Uruzgan (ISAF).

From 2011 to 2014, De Mol was Consul General in Saint Petersburg, Russian Federation. Here he oversaw the activities in the framework of the Netherlands-Russian year in 2013. In 2014, De Mol had a special assignment in Kyiv, Ukraine on the downing of flight MH17 by a Russian BUK-missile. Afterwards, he was Ambassador to the United Arab Emirates (2014-2015). From 2015 to 2019, he was Director Human Resources and Organisation at the Dutch Ministry of Foreign Affairs; From 2019 to 2024, he was Ambassador to Ukraine. Since August 2024, De Mol is Ambassador of the Kingdom of the Netherlands to Poland, also accredited to Belarus.

== Honors ==
NATO:

- NATO Non-Article 5 Medal ISAF 2010

Netherlands:

- Dutch Commemorative Medal for Peace Keeping Operations Ribbon

Slovakia:

- Medal of Appreciation third class (Bronze) of the Minister of Defence of the Slovak Republic

Ukraine:

- Ukrainian Order of Merit, 3rd class (2024)
