= Penny Wolin =

American photographer

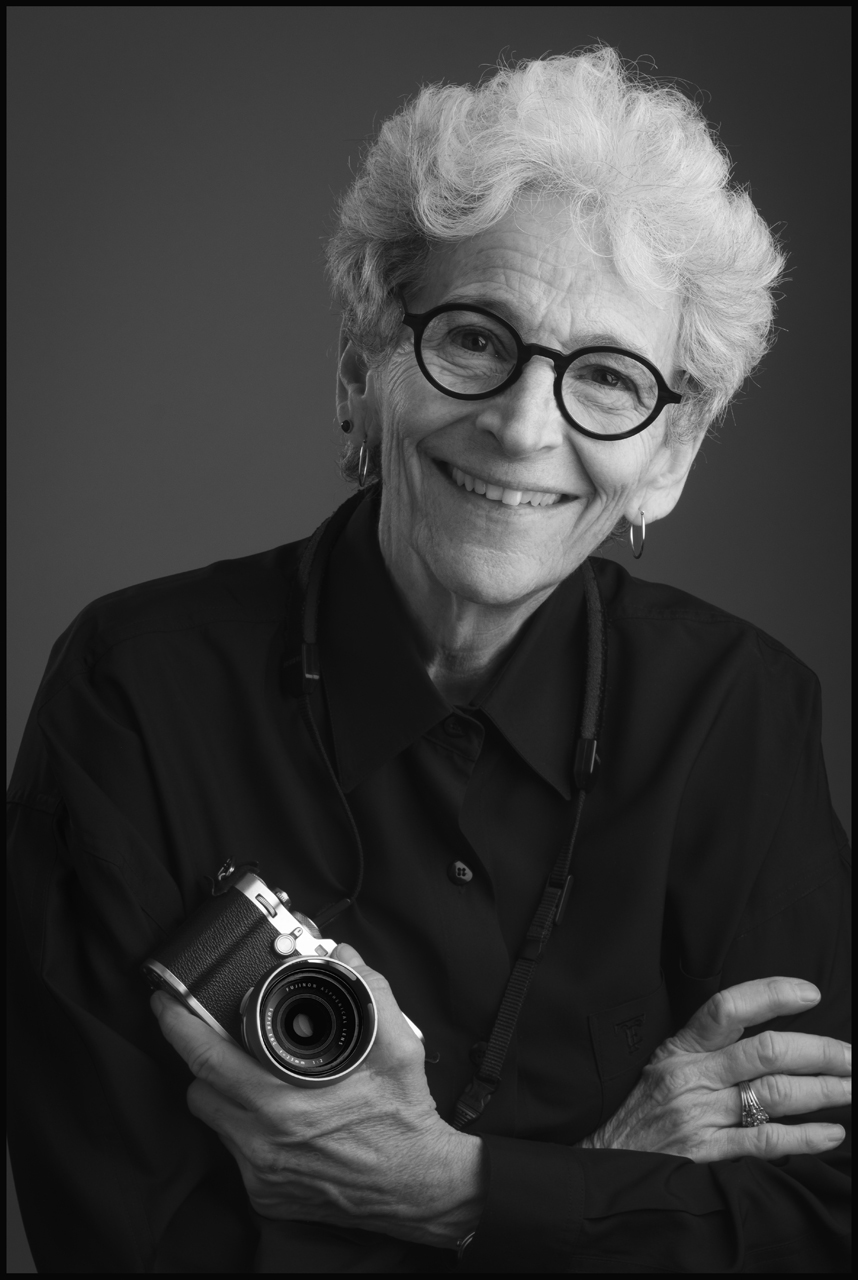
Penny Wolin Los Angeles

Penny Wolin (born June 5, 1953), also known as Penny Diane Wolin and Penny Wolin-Semple, is an American portrait photographer and a visual anthropologist. She has exhibited solo at the Smithsonian National Museum of American History and is the recipient of two grants from the National Endowment for the Humanities and one grant from the National Endowment for the Arts. Her work is held in the permanent collections of Harvard University, the Layton Art Collection at the Milwaukee Art Museum, the Santa Barbara Museum of Art, the New York Public Library, and the Smithsonian American Art Museum. She has completed commissions for major corporations, including the Walt Disney Company, LIFE Magazine and the Brant Foundation. For over 30 years, she has used photographic portraiture with oral interviews to research Jewish civilization in America.

== Youth and Education ==
Wolin is the youngest of five children born into a Conservadox Jewish family in Cheyenne, Wyoming. Her father, Morris Aaron Wolin (ne Wolinsky) immigrated there as a child, directly from the Russian town of Grodno, later to become a businessman. Her mother, Helen Sobol Wolin, came from Denver, Colorado, and was an artist. At age 10, Penny began using a Kodak Brownie Hawkeye. At age 16, her brother Michael Wolin gave her a high quality rangefinder camera and the necessary darkroom equipment to begin a career.

Wolin attended the University of Wyoming and then was graduated from Art Center College of Design in Pasadena, California, majoring in photography and film. She then attended a masters' program in the department of cultural anthropology at the University of California, Los Angeles, under the mentorship of Cultural Anthropologist Johannes Wilbert. Then, she was awarded a directing fellowship to the American Film Institute, Center for Advanced Film and Television Studies.

== Documentary Projects ==
=== Guest Register ===
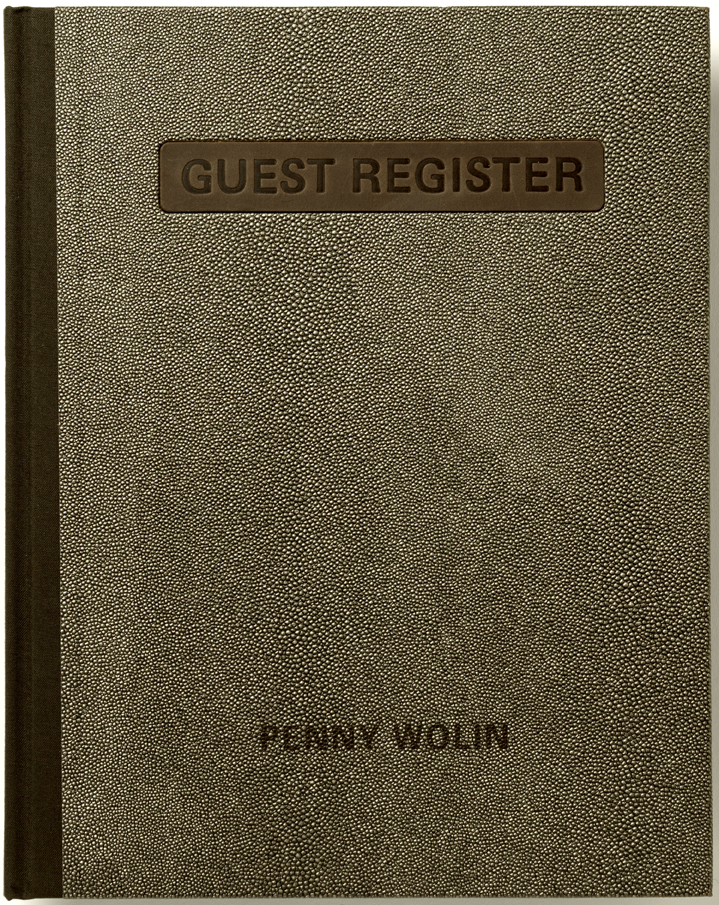

In 1975 at 21 years of age, while studying at ArtCenter College of Design, Penny Wolin moved into a Single Room Occupancy hotel, the St. Francis in Hollywood, California, and photographed and interviewed selected residents of the rooms. She created 34 black and white photographs with excerpted texts for Guest Register. The hotel, on the corner of Hollywood Boulevard and Western Avenue, sheltered a range of people from all ages and walks of life, staying from one night to thirty years. This work brought Wolin to the attention of graphic designers such as Lloyd Ziff, Art Director at New West Magazine; Bob Cato at A&M Records; and Marvin Israel; a graphic designer working in New York. After seeing Wolin's photography, Ziff commissioned Wolin to photograph Ansel Adams and George Burns; Cato commissioned Wolin to photograph the rock group The Band; Israel began designing a book maquette for publication by the Aperture Foundation and the Los Angeles County Museum of Art invited her to participate in a group exhibition.

=== Descendants of Light: American Photographers of Jewish Ancestry ===
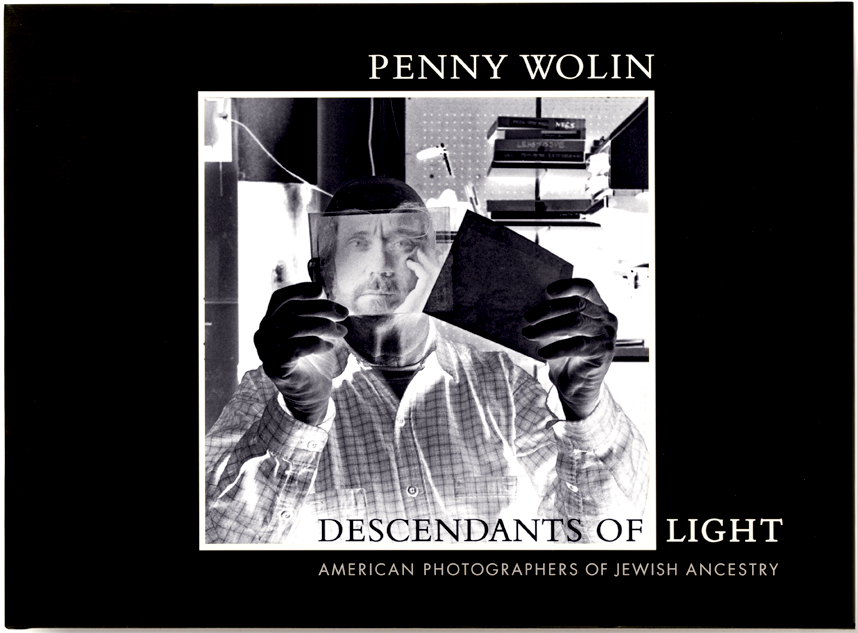

In 2005, Wolin began researching Descendants of Light: American Photographers of Jewish Ancestry. Since the 1850s, these photographers have contributed to journalistic, fashion, portrait, advertising and fine art photography. By photographing and interviewing each photographer, (or interviewing the living descendants of those who have died) re-photographing heirloom images of their ancestors and showcasing an iconic image that is of their own creation, Wolin is able to visually and verbally document a multi-generational story of the intersection between American Jewish culture, modern America and the history and practice of photography. Jewish-American photographers interviewed and photographed by Wolin include Lillian Bassman, Jo Ann Callis, Lauren Greenfield, Elinor Carucci, Lois Greenfield, Bruce Davidson, Annie Leibovitz, Herman Leonard, Helen Levitt, Jay Maisel, Joel Meyerowitz, Arnold Newman, Robert Frank and Joel-Peter Witkin. Posthumous interviews include the families of Philippe Halsman, Herb Ritts, Nickolas Muray, Arthur Rothstein, Roman Vishniac and Garry Winogrand.

=== The Jews of Wyoming: Fringe of the Diaspora ===
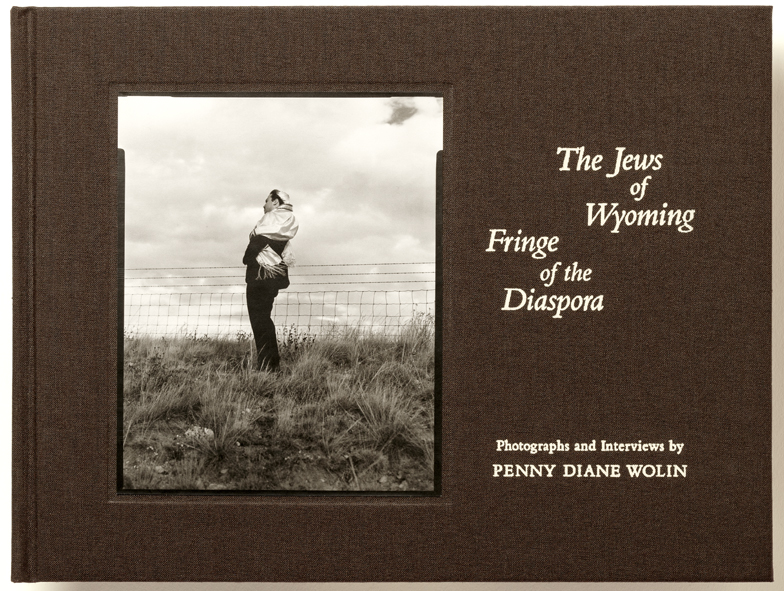

In 1982 Wolin met the late Shirley Burden, the major donor to the photography department of The Museum of Modern Art. With his encouragement and financial assistance as well as that of two National Endowment for the Humanities grants, as administered through the Wyoming Council for the Humanities, Wolin completed a visual and verbal study of 140 years and five generations of Jewish culture in Wyoming. The Jews of Wyoming: Fringe of The Diaspora was sponsored by what is now known as the Skirball Cultural Center in Los Angeles, California, and exhibited solo at the Smithsonian Institution, National Museum of American History, National Museum of American Jewish History, Judah L. Magnes Museum and Ucross Foundation. A book of the same title is published by Crazy Woman Creek Press.

=== Jackalopes, Cowboys and Coalmines: A Photographic Survey of Wyoming ===
In 1978, Wolin was awarded a National Endowment for the Arts major survey grant to complete Jackalopes, Cowboys and Coalmines: A Photographic Survey of Wyoming. Because of Wyoming's mineral and oil-rich natural resources, the state's history had been one of a boom or bust economy and culture. A national energy crisis made for a huge energy boom in Wolin's native state. This energy boom brought a final "Americanization" to the rural towns that sparsely dotted the least populated state in the union. Shopping malls and fast food outlets arrived; local downtown businesses closed, and the existing ranch economy was in turmoil. A worker's wage to tend cattle was no match for the higher wages being paid to work in an open-pit coal mine or a drilling rig. Traveling during each season throughout Wyoming, Wolin photographed and interviewed the native and newly arriving residents, ranging from cowboys to oilfield roughnecks to elected officials. The resulting work became a traveling exhibition that toured Wyoming as sponsored by then Governor Ed Herschler. The photographs and text are now held in the permanent collection of the Wyoming State Museum and the Smithsonian Institution, American Art Museum.

== Selected exhibitions ==
Year	Location	Title	Solo/Group
2026	Smithsonian Institution, American Art Museum (SAAM) Washington, DC	Jackalopes, Cowboys and Coalmines; A Photographic Survey of Wyoming	Group
2025	Leica Gallery, New York, New York	GUEST REGISTER	Solo
2018	Museum of Sonoma County, Santa Rosa, California	Aftermath: The Tubbs Fire	Group
2017	Calabi Gallery: Santa Rosa, California	Aftermath: The Tubbs Fire	Group
2012	Calabi Gallery: Santa Rosa, California	Descendants of Light: American Photographers of Jewish Ancestry	Solo
2011	New York Public Library, New York, New York	Recollection: Thirty Years of Photography	Group
2000	The Osher Marin Gallery: San Rafael, California	The Jews of Wyoming: Fringe of the Diaspora	Solo
1995	Eiteljorg Museum, Indianapolis, Indianapolis	Jackalopes, Cowboys and Coalmines: Energy Development and the Culture of the Cowboy	Group
1994	National Museum of American Jewish History, Philadelphia, Pennsylvania	The Jews of Wyoming: Fringe of the Diaspora	Solo
1992	Smithsonian Institution, National Museum of American History, Washington, DC	The Jews of Wyoming: Fringe of the Diaspora	Solo
1992	Judah L. Magnes Museum, Berkeley, CA,	The Jews of Wyoming: Fringe of the Diaspora	Solo
1990	Skirball Cultural Center, Los Angeles, California	The Jews of Wyoming: Fringe of the Diaspora	Solo
1990	Wyoming State Museum, Cheyenne, Wyoming	The Jews of Wyoming: Fringe of the Diaspora	Solo
1984	Ucross Foundation, Ucross, Wyoming	Jackalopes, Cowboys and Coalmines: Energy Development and the Culture of the Cowboy	Solo
1980	Wyoming State Museum, Cheyenne, Wyoming	Jackalopes, Cowboys and Coalmines: Energy Development and the Culture of the Cowboy	Solo
1980	The Nicolaysen Art Museum: Casper, Wyoming	Jackalopes, Cowboys and Coalmines: Energy Development and the Culture of the Cowboy	Solo

== Selected Assignments ==
- Roman Vishniac Estate: working with Mara Vishniac-Kohn to restore and print her father's photo microscopy work.
- Life (magazine): American Dreamer column with Anne Fadiman
- Life (magazine): American Dreamer portrait of Ursula K. Le Guin
- Wet (magazine): cover of Teri Garr, multiple article illustrations
- Playboy (magazine): Twenty Questions; Second City Television, John Matuszak, Charlton Heston, Bubba Smith, Leigh Steinberg, Ron Howard
- Discover (magazine): John Schwarz
- Conde Nast Traveler: As Others See Us; International Travel to Thailand, Hong Kong, Singapore, and Hawaii
- Rolling Stone (magazine): The Band, James Caan, Melissa Manchester, Chaka Khan, Michael Mann
- Esquire (magazine): Jon Jerde
- Forbes (magazine): David Geffen, Joe Roth, Eric Schmidt
- Graphis Inc. (magazine): cover of the artist Michael Schwab
- Vanity Fair (magazine), Discover magazine, Vogue magazine, Travel & Leisure magazine
- Sonoma Valley Film Festival: Art, Passion and Politics. Films by or about Women; Program Director
- Wolfgang Puck Food Company: restaurant interiors for Barbara Lazaroff, co-owner and designer
- Charles Schulz Museum: photographs of on-site art installations by the artists Michael Hayden and Yoshiteru Otani
- Peter Michael Winery, Cakebread Cellars, Kendall-Jackson Winery, Benovia Winery
- Cedars-Sinai Medical Center: Discoveries magazine cover and other in-house publications

== Teaching Positions ==
Year	Position	Institution	Course
2020 –2024	Adjunct Professor	ArtCenter College of Design; Pasadena, California	MFA Program; Visual Literacy Through the Lens
2019 –Present	Adjunct Professor	ArtCenter College of Design; Pasadena, California	Photography for Graphic Designers
2019 –2026	Artist in Residence	Meaningful Works Consultancy; Los Angeles, California	Lens Based Visual Literacy; Analysis of Word, Image and Light
2000	Program Director	Sonoma Valley Film Festival; Sonoma, California	Art, Passion and Politics
1999	Program Director	Sonoma Valley Film Festival; Sonoma, California	Films by or about Women
1998	Instructor	Academy of Art University; San Francisco, California	Documentary Portraiture
1996	Instructor	Art Center College of Design; Pasadena, California	History of Photography
1995	Instructor	Sonoma State University; Cotati, California	Film Production
1990	Instructor	Art Center College of Design; Pasadena, California	Documentary Portraiture
1986	Instructor	Art Center College of Design; Pasadena, California	Portraiture
1985	Instructor	California Institute of the Arts; Valencia, California	Photography for Graphic Designers
1982	Instructor	University of Idaho; Moscow, Idaho	Documentary Photography
1970	Instructor	4-H; Cheyenne, Wyoming	Kids and Cameras

== Selected Reviews ==
The New York Times Book Review, She checked in and immediately checked out her neighbors, Matthew Specktor writes, "What makes “Guest Register” so remarkable is not just its gentle spirit, nor even its democratic reach, but rather the expansiveness that grows out of these things together. Captioned in a way that is at once playful and exacting, and coupled with a brief essay that collapses the space between what Wolin calls 'existential Hollywood' and the actual place, these portraits show the opposite of what you might expect: a world in which dreams may be diminished but their originators, these noble occupants of the St. Francis Hotel, are radiant, beautiful, timelessly alive. The New York Times, December 2, 2022 "

The Los Angeles Times, Intimate portraits of St. Francis Hotel residents in 1975 capture a bygone Hollywood era: Deborah Vankin writes, "In the spring of 1975, Penny Wolin, a 21-year-old art student from Cheyenne, Wyo., moved into the storied St. Francis Hotel in Hollywood. The formerly upscale establishment, built in the 1920s, was by then a rough-around-the-edges, pay-by-the-week, brick hotel that had seen better days. Wolin lived there for three weeks to document its residents — a mix of misfits and dreamers, transients, artists and adventurers — for a photography project at ArtCenter College of Design." 7 photographs posted online: September 13, 2022.

The New York Times, California Today: Mike McPhate writes, "In the charred rubble of Santa Rosa it was the McDonald's that drew Penny Wolin, a photographer who lives nearby. Touring the destruction last week, she was stunned by the amount of destruction. 'I had to really calm down,' she said." 6 photographs posted online: October 20, 2017. "

Kirkus Reviews, "Descendants of Light: American Photographers of Jewish Ancestry": "The entries, arranged alphabetically, offer an intriguing range of opinions, styles, eras, and insights, together with large, beautifully reproduced photographs… A rich, well-documented collection for students of photography and Jewish culture."

The Wall Street Journal, What To Give Photography Books: William Meyers writes, "Rather than speculate on why so many Jews have been involved in photography, Penny Wolin, herself a Jewish photographer, decided to ask them. In Descendants of Light: American Photographers of Jewish Ancestry (Crazy Woman Creek Press, 244 pages) she has testimony from or about Diane Arbus, Richard Avedon, Bruce Davidson, Philippe Halsman, Annie Leibovitz, Helen Levitt, Rosalind Solomon, Alfred Stieglitz, and more than 60 others."

The New York Jewish Week, In Search of the Jewish Angle on Things: Sandee Brawarsky writes, "Penny Wolin has been described as 'a street photographer who knocks on the door.' She has the openness, spontaneity and spirit of the street, along with the gift of conversation. Working on her new book, Descendants of Light: American Photographers of Jewish Ancestry (Crazy Woman Creek Press), she traversed the country to meet photographers in their homes and studios." Wolin raises a key question as to why so many Jews are drawn to the field of photography; her piece previews her work-in-progress of crossing the country, interviewing photographers."

University Press of Mississippi, Through the Lens of the City: NEA Photography Surveys of the 1970s: In an interview with Mark Rice, Wolin notes, "Wyoming was not inundated with the mass American culture. There wasn't a McDonald's in every town nor a Holiday Inn. I could see that was changing and felt compelled to document people and their sense of the changes." Rice writes, "Although Wolin didn't particularly like the influx of corporate services chains, her 1978 survey was not an indictment of the changes in Wyoming. It was, instead, a project that sought to document "America's last frontier…small town societies, and the western spirit." A press release from the Wyoming Council on the Arts noted that Wolin's central concern was "the final and inevitable assimilation of the Old West into the American culture." (emphasis added.) Wolin's survey was less an overtly political act than a nod to a passing way of life."

San Francisco Chronicle, Mick Lasalle writes, " [...the most exciting aspect of the festival is its resurrection of past classics, giving the public a chance to see a trio of great black-and-white films in their original splendor... Penny Wolin, the programming chair of the festival, chose 'Olympia' on the basis of artistic quality and importance." "If you want to show documentaries by or about women," says Wolin, "the greatest ones ever made were by Leni Riefenstahl."

San Francisco Chronicle, Jon Carroll writes, "She had a wonderful way with black and white portrait work, and a loving approach to her subjects [...] in my mail arrived a splendid book called The Jews of Wyoming: Fringe of the Diaspora."

Los Angeles Times, Gregory Rodriguez in his review of The Jews of Wyoming writes, 'Wolin tells the more complex story of adaptation and evolution. Wolin, a documentary photographer who has made a living for the last two decades photographing celebrities, spent 15 years putting together this triumphant epic of the 150-year history of Jews in the Cowboy State. ...Indeed, the book's wide range of images and personalities is what gives it its dynamism. Wolin has not sought to define what it means to be Jewish in the least populated state of the union. Instead, she seems to revel in the multiplicity of definitions among believers and nonbelievers; those who identify strongly as Jews and those who do not. Her subjects are posed in the settings or with the props that make them unique as individuals. A young member of the Future Farmers of America holds a pig by its hind legs before an open field. 'I don't eat them,' he says. 'But I give someone else a good product.'"

The Washington Post, At National Museum of American History: Sarah Booth Conroy writes, "Going through the exhibition takes time as the viewer tries to understand the text and the photographs, both works of art. The words and pictures are so poignant and sometimes so surprising that they are worth the study. Wolin is a fine photographer and a first-class interviewer and her choices of people on whom to focus are inspired."

Los Angeles Times, "An unlikely people in an unlikely place, the Jews of Wyoming did not become "the cowboy mensches " entertainer Mickey Katz sang about in his Yiddish rendition of I'm an Old Cowhand. Their co-existence alongside such an incongruous culture, however, did make them an unusual microcosm of the Jewish experience in the United States."

Los Angeles Times, Art Review: 'Hollywood' Resembles A Cutting-room Floor, Colin Gardner writes, "The show's one saving grace is its photography, in particular Penny Wolin's Diane Arbus-like Guest Register (1975), a poignant yet devastating documentation of the residents of the St. Francis Hotel near the Hollywood Walk of Fame. Combining image and text, Wolin's examination of life's lost souls and anonymous citizens who are just passing through manages to be both emotionally distanced without being condescending."

American Photographer magazine, Getting a Grip on Hollywood: David Roberts writes in his feature article, "She is...a methodical, quiet professional who uses large negatives, poses her subjects carefully and concentrates on details... Unlike so many top photographers, Wolin is good at paying attention to other people and at submerging her ego to that of her subject."
