= Merry Karnowsky Gallery =

Art gallery in Los Angeles, California, United States

Coordinates: 34.071430°N 118.343837°W

The Merry Karnowsky Gallery was founded in Los Angeles Merry Karnowsky. It is located on South La Brea Avenue in the Mid-City West district of Central Los Angeles.

The gallery exhibits contemporary art, and it is part of the underground "lowbrow" art movement, showing works of pop surrealism and from the street art scene. Exhibitions have included the artists: Shepard Fairey, Camille Rose Garcia, Mercedes Helnwein, Dave McKean, Mark Ryden, Todd Schorr, Edward Walton Wilcox and Kent Williams.

In 2007, Karnowsky opened a second gallery in the Mitte district of Berlin, Germany.

== See also ==
- Junko Mizuno
- Long Gone John
- Miss Van
- Andre the Giant Has a Posse
