= Cinderalla =

Japanese manga

- Cover of the Japanese first edition

水野純子のシンデラーラちゃん (Mizuno Junko no Shinderāra-chan)
- Genre: Fantasy, Horror
- Manga
- Written by: Junko Mizuno
- Published by: Koushinsya
- English publisher: NA: Viz Media
- English magazine: Pulp
- Published: February 2000
- Volumes: 1

Cinderalla (Japanese: 水野純子のシンデラーラちゃん, Hepburn: Mizuno Junko no Shinderāra-chan), also known as Junko Mizuno's Cinderalla, is a fantasy-horror manga written and illustrated by Junko Mizuno. It was published by Koushinsya; later an English version was released by Viz Media in 2002. It is one in a line of her new version on old fairy tales, the others are Hansel & Gretel and Princess Mermaid. In the English book there is an interview between Izumi Evers and Junko Mizuno. Andy Nakatani has translated the interview into English.

== Plot ==
An adaptation of the fairy tale "Cinderella", Cinderalla focuses on the eponymous protagonist, who works as a waitress in her father's yakitori (skewered chicken) restaurant. One day, he dies from overeating, only to rise again during the night as a zombie. Her father remarries, having fallen in love with another zombie, the ceaselessly hungry Caroline. Cinderalla's elder zombie stepsisters, Akko and Aki, only add to her workload. One day, while searching for the bra that she is making for Aki, she falls in love with a male zombie. Later, she and her mouse friend, Setsuko, rescue a starving fairy from some twin boys planning to dissect her. The fairy reveals that she cannot return to her home until she has gained her magical powers, and Cinderalla allows her to stay at her home.

Eventually, Cinderalla learns that the zombie she loves is actually the Prince, a singer with an upcoming performance. Taking on part-time work, Cinderalla saves for her ticket, although she goes to buy it, she finds herself rejected because only zombies are allowed to attend. Disappointed, she returns home and becomes intoxicated with her friends. The fairy transforms her into a zombie, and joyful, Cinderalla leaves to attend the performance. While making his appearance from the ceiling, the Prince accidentally falls onto Cinderalla, causing her to lose consciousness. She awakens in a bed with him beside her, and they have sex. Realizing that dawn is approaching, when the spell will wear off, Cinderalla dresses and leaves him, although she loses her right eye when she trips.

While Cinderalla conceals the loss of her eye, the Prince announces his intention to marry the zombie woman whom the eye fits. The zombie women all pluck out one of their eyes, and Akko deceives the prince into believing that she is Cinderalla, although Cinderalla reveals Akko's deception with the help of Setsuko and the fairy, who now possesses all of her magical powers. Transformed into a zombie, Cinderalla marries the Prince. As Cinderalla concludes, Cinderalla has become successful with her giant fruits grown from yakitori sauce, and her husband does dinner shows at her father's remodeled restaurant. Now a celebrity, the fairy makes frequent television appearances, while Aki marries a reporter and Akko follows foreign idols. Cinderalla also buys a pancake-making machine for Caroline. Cinderalla also includes three short, related manga: "How Caroline Became a Glutton", which explores her backstory as a stripper; "Papa's Professional Cooking", which details a recipe for the fictitious sauce; and "Of Course We All Know", which focuses on the Prince's backstory in the form of lyrics.

== Development and release ==
After the publication of her first major manga, the post-apocalyptic Pure Trance (1998), manga artist Junko Mizuno wrote and illustrated Cinderalla. According to Mizuno, her then-current manager, a graphic designer, and an editor had "wanted to make money using [her]," and as they thought she had no skill in creating original stories, they had wanted her to make something with a basis in older, pre-existing narratives, such as European fairy tales. She had been familiar with European fairy tales, which she read often as a child and found scary. Cinderalla was completed quickly in half a year, with no assistant. Because she did not own a computer at the time, she was unable to color the manga herself; she later expressed her unhappiness with the coloring done by Koushinsya's designer, who she felt did not adhere to her wishes. Cinderalla did not appear as a serial in a magazine, but instead was directly published as a bound volume in Japan by Koushinsya in February 2000. Mizuno continued her fairy tale adaptations with Hansel and Gretel and Princess Mermaid.

Mizuno later obtained the rights to manage the foreign editions of Cinderalla. In 2001, Cinderalla was licensed for an English-language translation in North America by Viz Media, who serialized the manga in its adult manga magazine Pulp from the May 2001 issue to the July 2002 issue. Viz Media then released a left-to-right volume of Cinderalla in July 2002. Mizuno took an active role in adapting her fairy tales for an English-language audience: she reversed the manga's original right-to-left art and subsequently redrew some pages. Envisioning "the feel of a cheap American comic," she recolored the manga with "soft colors" and decided that it should be printed on pulp paper, in contrast to the "too bright and white" Japanese edition. Cinderalla has also been translated into French by Imho in 2004, into Portuguese by Editora Conrad in 2006, and into Spanish by Imho in 2008.

== Reception ==
The Greenwood Encyclopedia of Folktales and Fairy Tales wrote that Cinderalla contained irony and dark humor, and its ending of Cinderalla's forgiveness of her stepsisters was reminiscent of the version written by Charles Perrault. Fausto Salvadori of the Brazilian newspaper Folha de S.Paulo described it as a sarcastic, bizarre and dark humor version of Cinderella that read like "an episode of The Powerpuff Girls written and directed by Coffin Joe". The dark humor was also highlighted by Rebeca Fernández of the Spanish newspaper Público who described it as union of Hello Kitty and Chucky.
