= Wet (magazine) =

United States cultural magazine

- Issue 8 August/September 1977 (cover)
- Editor: Leonard Koren
- Categories: Bathing
- Frequency: Bimonthly
- Founded: 1976
- Final issue Number: November/December 1981; 34
- Company: WET Enterprises
- Country: United States
- Language: English
- Website: wetmagazine.com

WET: The Magazine of Gourmet Bathing was a publication of the 1970s and early 80s. Founded by Leonard Koren in 1976 it ran thirty-four issues before closing in 1981. The idea for the magazine grew out of the artwork Leonard Koren was doing at the time—what he termed 'bath art'—and followed on the heels of a party he threw at the Pico-Burnside Baths.

As Kristine McKenna, music editor for WET from 1979 until 1981, wrote: "The world wasn't crying out for a periodical on bathing when Leonard Koren introduced Wet magazine in 1976. However, Koren had the imagination and audacity to create his own world, and that's exactly what he did with Wet: The Magazine of Gourmet Bathing."

WET covered a range of cultural issues and was widely known for its use of graphic art. Started as a simple one-man operation that included artwork and text solicited from friends and acquaintances, the production, team, and circulation of the magazine would grow over the years. Its content also evolved to cover a wider expanse of stories that captured a Los Angeles attitude that was emerging at the same time as punk, but with its own distinct aesthetic. As design problems arose, solutions were often improvised on the spot. Its layout and design helped to catalyze the graphic styles later known as New Wave and Postmodern. In a letter he wrote on August 25, 1988, Tibor Kalman, president of M&Co. wrote that Wet "is one of the most important and well-designed magazines in U.S. design history."

Wet featured Laurie Anderson, David Lynch, and others with its interviews. It also covered the novel (at the time) aesthetic of taking care of one's body, per nutrition, such as introducing wheatgrass juice to a broader public. Stylized fashion photography brought the concept of toddlers with mohawks and a punked out version of modern Americana.

Throughout its production, WET continued to draw from a variety of artists and contributors. Contributing photographers included Eric Blum, Moshe Brakha, Guy Fery, Jim Ganzer, Brian Hagiwara, Brian Leatart, Jacques-Henri Latrigue, Dana Levy, Claude Mougin, Beverly Parker, Lisa Powers, Herb Ritts, Matthew Rolston, Raul Vega, Guy Webster, and Penny Wolin. WET also included artwork by Rip Georges, April Greiman, Matt Groening, Jim Heimann, Thomas Ingalls, Kim Jones, Jayme Odgers, Taki Ono, Futzie Nutzle, Gary Panter, Peter Shire, John Van Hamersveld, David Jordan Williams, Teruhiko Yumura, and Bob Zoell. The 1980s January/February edition of WET featured a photo of Richard Gere by Larry Williams on its cover.

In April 2012, Koren released Making WET: The Magazine of Gourmet Bathing. Published by Imperfect Publishing, it tells the story of WET.

== See also ==
- Mondo 2000
- Wired (magazine)
