= Pelu =

Pelu (or variants) may refer to:

== Arts, entertainment, and media ==
- La Pelu, a 2013 Argentine humoristic program
- Little Fluffy Gigolo Pelu, a Japanese manga series

== People ==
=== Surname ===
- John Pelu (born 1982), Swedish former professional football
- Piero Pelù (born 1962), Italian singer and songwriter
- Samsul Pelu (born 1995), Indonesian professional football player

=== Given name ===
- Pelu Awofeso, Nigerian journalist, travel and culture writer
- Pelu Taele (born 1981), New Zealand international rugby union footballer
