= Wabi-sabi =

Japanese aesthetic about imperfection

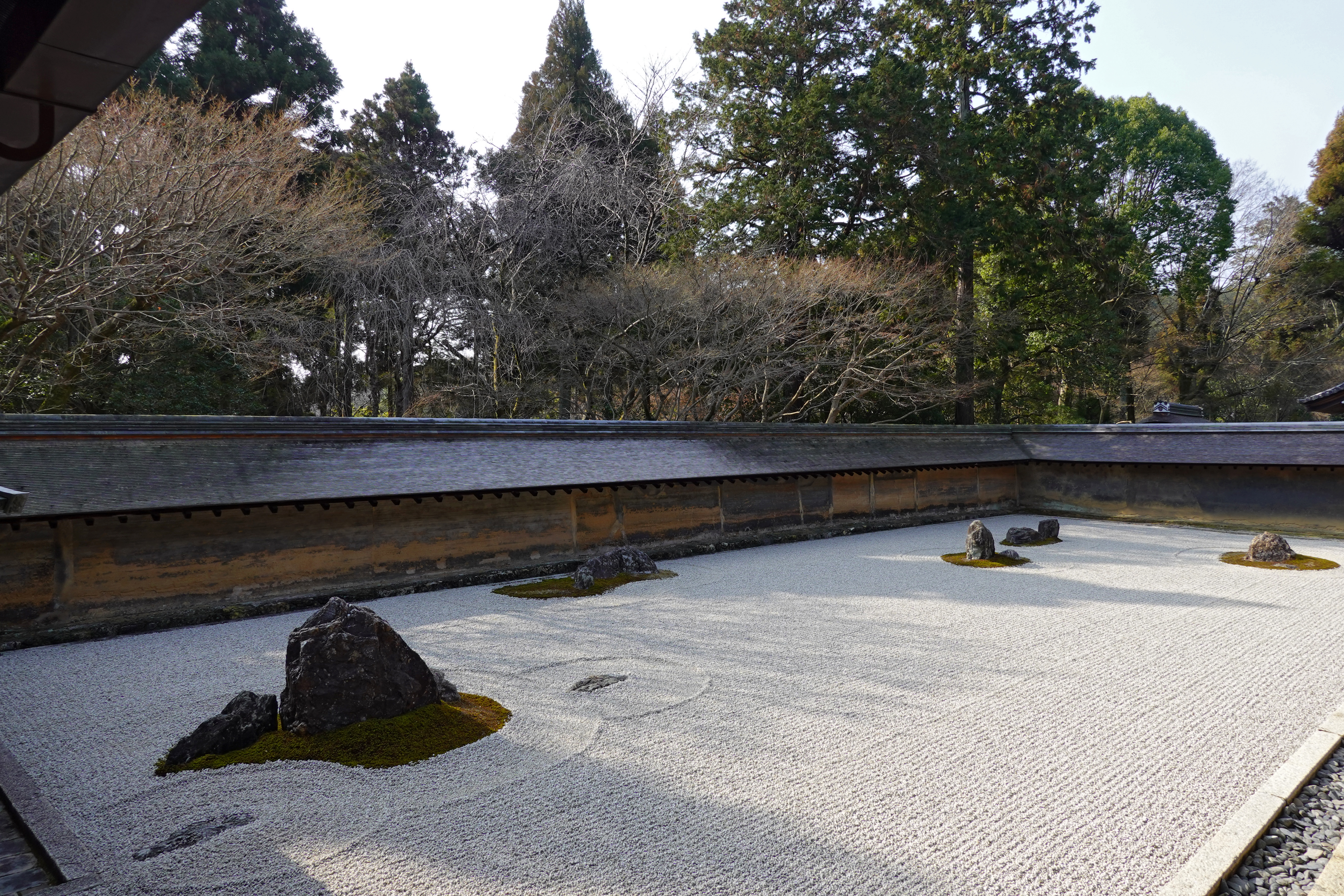
Zen garden of Ryōan-ji, built during the Higashiyama period. The clay wall, stained with subtle brown and orange tones, reflects sabi principles, while the rock garden reflects wabi principles.

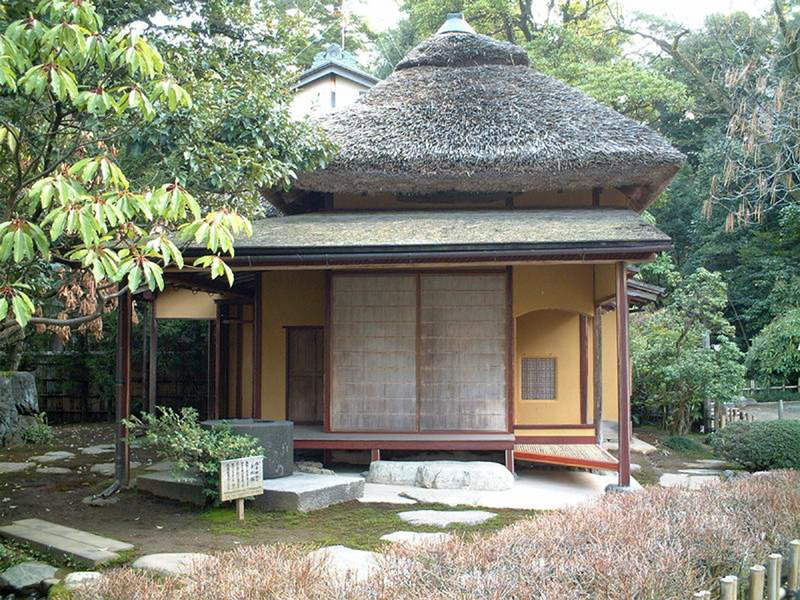
A Japanese tea house reflecting the wabi-sabi aesthetic in Kenroku-en (兼六園) Garden

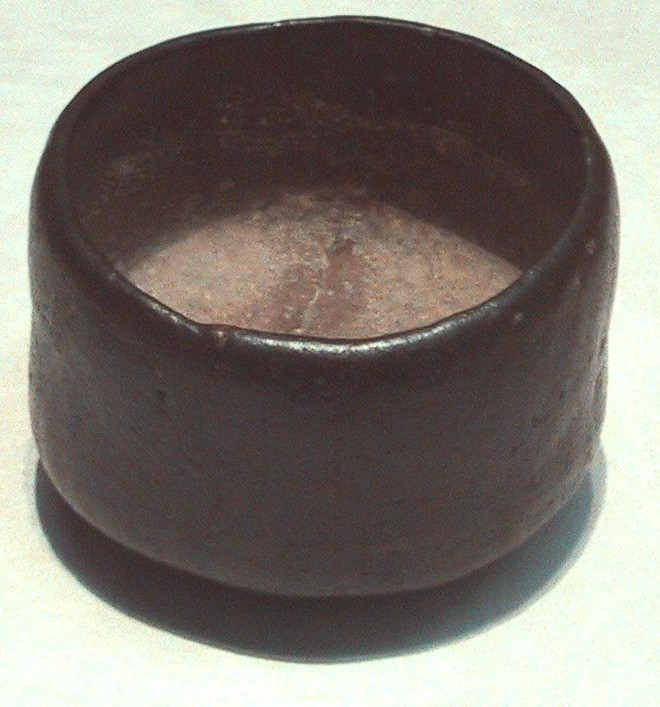
Wabi-sabi tea bowl, Azuchi–Momoyama period, 16th century

In traditional Japanese aesthetics, wabi-sabi (侘び寂び) centers on the acceptance of transience and imperfection. It is often described as the appreciation of beauty that is "imperfect, impermanent, and incomplete". It is prevalent in many forms of Japanese art.

Wabi-sabi combines two interrelated concepts: wabi (侘) and sabi (寂). According to the Stanford Encyclopedia of Philosophy, wabi may be translated as "subdued, austere beauty", and sabi as "rustic patina". Wabi-sabi derives from the Buddhist teaching of the three marks of existence (三法印, sanbōin), which include impermanence (無常, mujō), suffering (苦, ku), and emptiness or absence of self-nature (空, kū).

Characteristics of wabi-sabi aesthetics and principles include asymmetry, roughness, simplicity, economy, austerity, modesty, intimacy, and the appreciation of natural objects and the forces of nature.

== Description ==
Wabi-sabi has been described as "the most conspicuous and characteristic feature of what we think of as traditional Japanese beauty. It occupies roughly the same position in the Japanese pantheon of aesthetic values as do the Greek ideals of beauty and perfection in the West." Andrew Juniper writes that, "If an object or expression can bring about, within us, a sense of serene melancholy and a spiritual longing, then that object could be said to be wabi-sabi." According to Richard Powell, "Wabi-sabi nurtures all that is authentic by acknowledging three simple realities: nothing lasts, nothing is finished, and nothing is perfect."

When considering an English translation of the words wabi and sabi, Juniper explains that "they have been used to express a vast range of ideas and emotions, and so their meanings are more open to personal interpretation than almost any other word in the Japanese vocabulary." As a result, attempts to translate wabi-sabi directly may obscure the ambiguity essential to its meaning.

After centuries of incorporating artistic and Buddhist influences from China, wabi-sabi evolved into a distinctly Japanese ideal. Over time, the meanings of wabi and sabi became more lighthearted and hopeful. Around 700 years ago, particularly among the Japanese nobility, understanding emptiness and imperfection came to be regarded as a first step toward satori or enlightenment. In contemporary Japan, wabi-sabi is often summarized as "wisdom in natural simplicity". In art books, it is typically defined as "flawed beauty". Works in the wabi-sabi style often emphasize process, with the piece understood as ultimately incomplete.

From a design or engineering perspective, wabi may refer to the imperfect quality of an object resulting from inherent limitations in design and manufacture, especially under changing or unpredictable conditions. In this context, sabi could relate to impermanent reliability or the object's finite lifespan. There is also a phonological and etymological connection with the Japanese word sabi (錆, lit. 'to rust'). Although the kanji for "rust" differs from sabi (寂) in wabi-sabi, the original spoken term (from pre-kanji yamato-kotoba) is believed to have been the same.

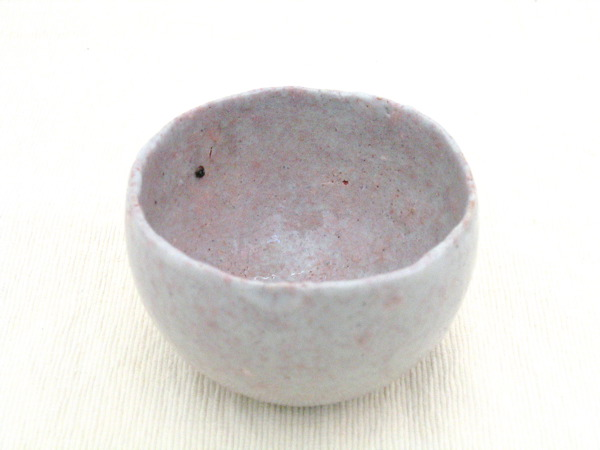
Modern tea vessel made in the wabi-sabi style

Wabi and sabi both convey feelings of desolation and solitude. Within Mahayana Buddhism, these can be considered positive traits, representing release from the material world and the possibility of transcendence to a simpler life. As Mahayana philosophy emphasizes direct experience over verbal explanation, wabi-sabi may be best understood in a non-verbal, experiential way.

Although wabi and sabi have religious origins, their usage in contemporary Japanese language is often informal, consistent with the syncretic nature of Japanese spiritual practice.

== History ==
Wabi-sabi has roots in Zen Buddhism. It began to shape Japanese culture when the Zen priest Murata Jukō (村田珠光, 1423–1502) modified the tea ceremony. He introduced simple, rough wooden and clay instruments in place of the gold, jade, and porcelain then popular in the Chinese-style tea service. About one hundred years later, the tea master Sen no Rikyū (千利休, 1522 to 21 April 1591) introduced wabi-sabi to the nobility through his design of the teahouse. "He constructed a teahouse with a door so low that even the emperor would have to bow in order to enter, reminding everyone of the importance of humility before tradition, mystery, and spirit."

== In Japanese arts ==
At first, something that exhibited wabi-sabi qualities could only be discovered. It could be "found in the simple dwellings of the farmers that dotted the landscape, epitomized in neglected stone lanterns overgrown with moss or in simple bowls and other household utensils used by the common folk." However, toward the end of the late medieval period, the ruling class began using these aesthetic values to intentionally create "tea ceremony utensils, handicrafts, tea ceremony rooms and cottages, homes, gardens, even food and sweets, and above all manners and etiquette."

Many forms of Japanese art have been influenced by Zen and Mahayana philosophy over the past thousand years. The contemplation and acceptance of imperfection, as well as the awareness of constant flux and impermanence, have been particularly important to Japanese arts and culture. Accordingly, many Japanese art forms can be seen as encapsulating and exemplifying the ideals of wabi-sabi.

=== Garden design ===
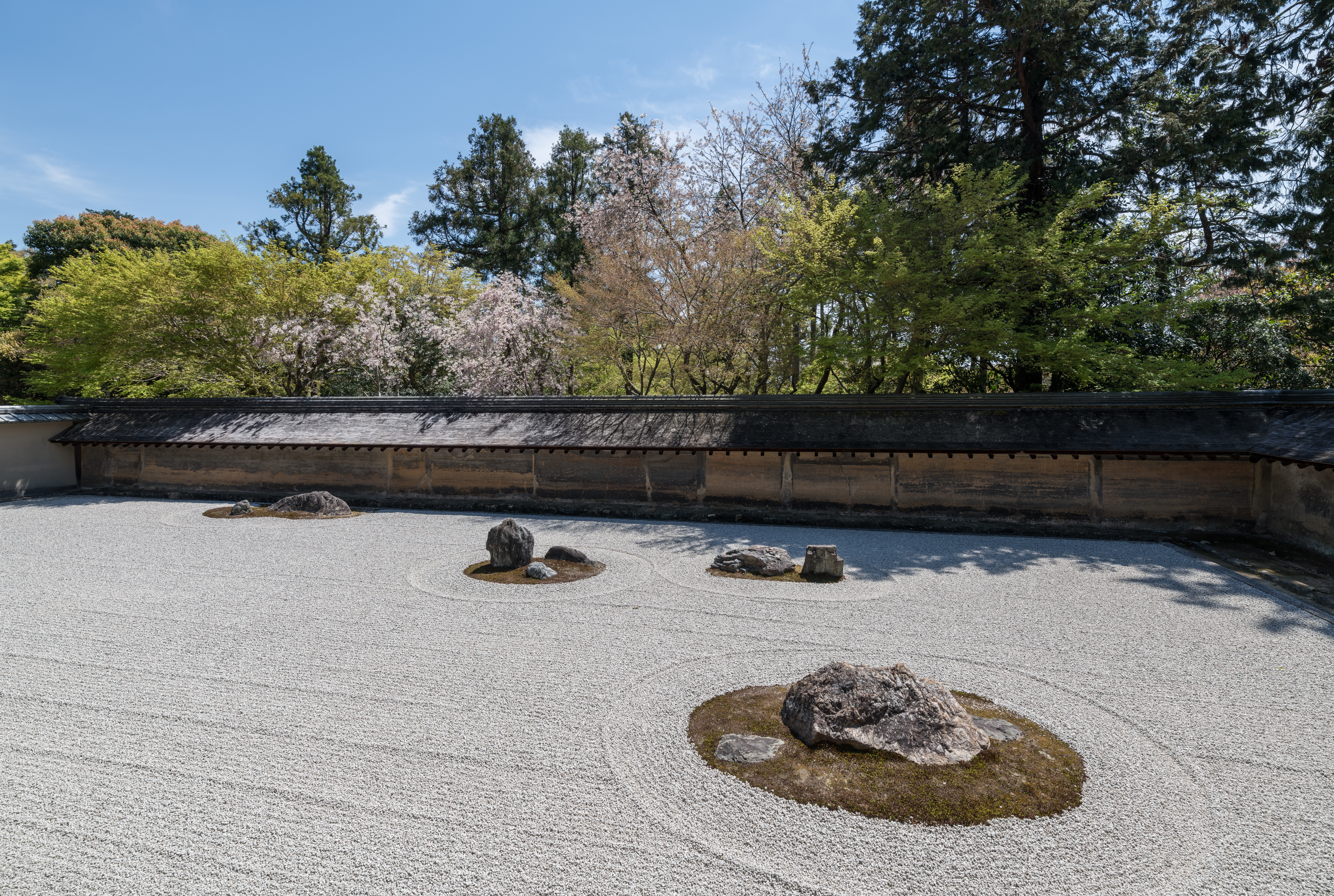
Ryōan-ji (late 16th century) in Kyoto, Japan, a well-known example of a Zen garden

Japanese gardens began as simple open spaces intended to attract kami, or spirits. During the Kamakura period, Zen ideals began to influence Japanese garden design. Temple gardens were arranged with large rocks and other natural materials to form Karesansui, or Zen rock gardens. "Their designs imbued the gardens with a sense of the surreal and beckoned viewers to forget themselves and become immersed in the seas of gravel and the forests of moss. By loosening the rigid sense of perception, the actual scales of the garden became irrelevant and the viewers were able to then perceive the huge landscapes deep within themselves."

==== Tea gardens ====
Due to the tea garden's close relationship with the tea ceremony, "the tea garden became one of the richest expressions of wabi sabi." These small gardens typically incorporated elements of wabi-sabi design. They were meant to invite interpretation and place the visitor in a contemplative state, preparing them to take part in the tea ceremony.

=== Poetry ===
Japanese poetry such as tanka and haiku is typically very short and focuses on the defining attributes of a scene. "By withholding verbose descriptions, the poem entices the reader to actively participate in the fulfillment of its meaning and, as with the Zen gardens, to become an active participant in the creative process." One of the most famous Japanese poets, Bashō, was credited with establishing sabi as a definitive emotive force in haiku. Many of his works, like other wabi-sabi expressions, avoid sentimentality or superfluous adjectives, instead presenting the "devastating imagery of solitude."

=== Ceramics ===
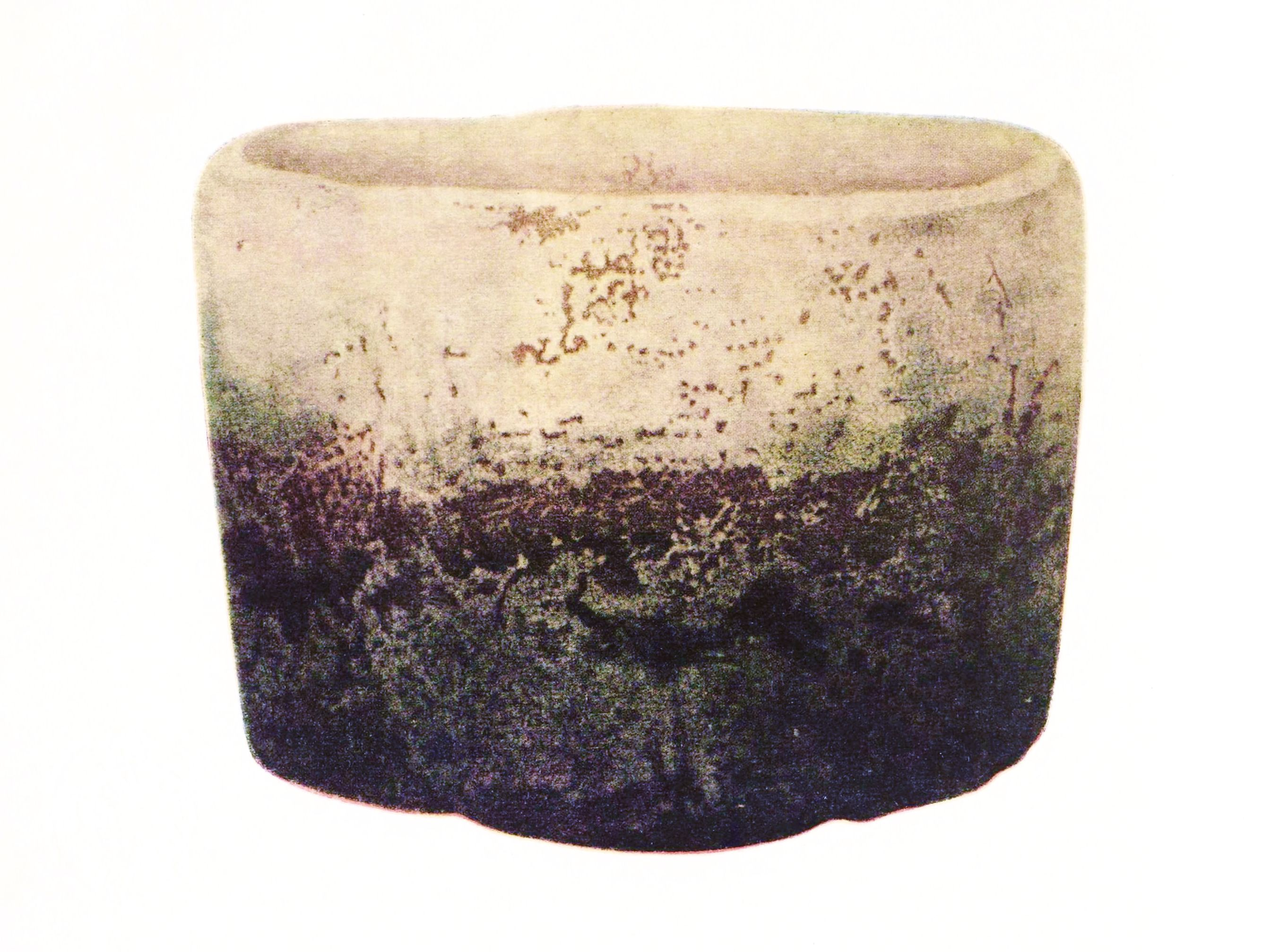
Mount Fuji tea bowl by Hon'ami Kōetsu, designated a national treasure

As the preference for simplicity and modesty grew, Zen masters came to view ornate Chinese ceramics as overly decorative and ostentatious. Japanese potters began to explore freer expressions of beauty, moving away from uniformity and symmetry. New kiln technologies made a range of colors, forms, and textures possible, and potters produced unique, nonuniform pieces. One type of firing was favored for its natural, unpredictable effects and the organic ash glazes it produced, which were regarded as an embodiment of wabi-sabi.

One example is the white raku bowl Mount Fuji (Shiroraku-Chawan, Fujisan), made by Hon'ami Kōetsu (本阿弥 光悦; 1558 – 27 February 1637), which has been designated a national treasure by the Japanese government.

Kintsugi, a technique that uses gold lacquer to repair broken pottery, is also regarded as an expression of wabi-sabi.

=== Flower arrangement ===
Sen no Rikyū rejected the ornate rikka style popular at the time, disliking its rigid formalism and elaborate Chinese vases. Instead, he used simple vessels to display flowers, known as chabana, in his tea ceremonies. Rather than selecting impressive or cultivated blooms, he preferred wildflowers. "Ikebana, like the gardens, uses a living medium in the creative process, and it is this ingredient of life that brings a unique feel to flower arrangements."

Ikebana then became an important part of the tea ceremony, and the flowers were treated with great respect. "When a tea-master has arranged a flower to his satisfaction he will place it on the tokonoma, the place of honour in a Japanese room. It rests there like an enthroned prince, and the guests or disciples on entering the room will salute it with a profound bow before making their addresses to the host."

=== Other examples ===
Other traditional expressions of wabi-sabi include:

- Honkyoku—the traditional shakuhachi (bamboo flute) music of wandering Zen monks.
- The essay In Praise of Shadows by Jun'ichirō Tanizaki, which offers a modern Japanese perspective on wabi-sabi.
- The cultivation of bonsai (miniature trees). A typical bonsai design features rough-textured wood, deadwood sections, or hollow trunks, all intended to highlight the passage of time and natural imperfection. Bonsai are often displayed in autumn or winter after shedding their leaves, revealing the bare branches.
- The tea ceremony.

== Influence upon the West ==
Wabi-sabi has been adopted in the West across the arts, technology, media, and mental health.

=== The arts ===
Some Western designers, writers, poets, and artists have incorporated wabi-sabi ideals into their work.

- Designer Leonard Koren (born 1948) published Wabi-Sabi for Artists, Designers, Poets & Philosophers (1994), a study of wabi-sabi that contrasts it with Western ideals of beauty. According to Penelope Green, the book "became a talking point for a wasteful culture intent on penitence and a touchstone for designers of all stripes."
- Wabi-sabi played a significant role in the development of Western studio pottery. Bernard Leach (1887–1979) was deeply influenced by Japanese aesthetics and techniques, particularly as reflected in his foundational book, A Potter's Book.
- The work of American artist John Connell (1940–2009) is also considered to be centered on wabi-sabi. Other artists influenced by the idea include former Stuckist and remodernist filmmaker Jesse Richards (born 1975), who incorporates wabi-sabi and mono no aware into much of his work.
- Some haiku in English adopt wabi-sabi aesthetics through minimalist structure and themes of loneliness and transience. An example is Nick Virgilio's poem:

autumn twilight:
the wreath on the door
lifts in the wind

=== Technology ===
During the 1990s, the concept was adopted by computer software developers and used in contexts such as agile programming and wiki platforms. It described the acceptance of ongoing imperfection in software development produced through iterative methods. It has also been used as a lens with which to assess the limitations of overly standardized LLM models in AI.

=== Mental health ===
Wabi-sabi has also been cited in mental health contexts as a helpful concept for reducing perfectionist thinking.

=== In media ===
In 2009, Marcel Theroux presented In Search of Wabi Sabi on BBC Four as part of its Hidden Japan programming season. He traveled throughout Japan attempting to understand the aesthetic preferences of its people.

== See also ==
- Clinamen
- Higashiyama Bunka in the Muromachi period
- I Ching
- Iki (a Japanese aesthetic ideal)
- Kintsugi (also known as kintsukuroi)
- Mono no aware
- Perfect is the enemy of good
- Shibui
- Tao Te Ching
- Teaism
- Wabi-cha

== Bibliography ==
- Burnham, Robert Jr. (1978). Burnham's Celestial Handbook: An Observer's Guide to the Universe Beyond the Solar System, Volume III: Pavo Through Vulpecula. Dover Books. pp. 1625–1626. ISBN 978-0-486-23673-5.
- Crowley, James; Crowley, Sandra; Putnam, Joseph (2001). Wabi Sabi Style. Layton, Utah: Gibbs Smith. ISBN 978-1-58685-753-0.
- Davies, Roger; Ikeno, Osamu, eds. (2002). The Japanese Mind: Understanding Contemporary Japanese Culture. Boston: Tuttle Publishing. pp. 223–231. ISBN 978-0-8048-3295-3.
- Koren, Leonard (2008). Wabi Sabi for Artists, Designers, Poets & Philosophers. Point Reyes, California: Imperfect Publishing. ISBN 978-0-9814846-0-0.
- Juniper, Andrew (2003). Wabi Sabi: The Japanese Art of Impermanence. Tuttle Publishing. ISBN 978-1-4629-0161-6.
- Suzuki, Daisetz Teitarō (1959). "General Remarks on Japanese Art Culture". Zen and Japanese Culture. New York: Pantheon Books. pp. 19–38. OCLC 716149205.
- Tierney, Lennox (1999). Wabi Sabi: A New Look at Japanese Design. Layton, Utah: Gibbs Smith. ISBN 978-0-87905-849-4.
