= Todd Schorr =

American painter

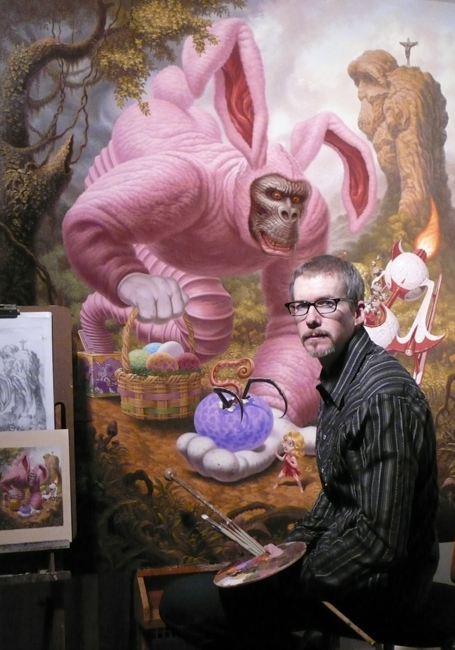
Todd Schorr

Todd Schorr (born January 9, 1954) is an American artist and member of the "Lowbrow", or pop surrealism, art movement. Combining a cartoon influenced visual vocabulary with a highly polished technical ability, based on the exacting painting methods of the Old Masters, Schorr weaves intricate narratives that are often biting yet humorous in their commentary on the human condition.

== Early life and education ==
While growing up as a child in New Jersey, Schorr showed a compulsion for drawing at an early age and was enrolled in Saturday morning art classes by the age of five. Deeply affected by fantasy movies such as the 1933 classic King Kong and the early animated cartoons of Walt Disney and Max Fleischer, their influence along with comic books such as Mad would have a lasting effect on Schorr's developing visual vocabulary.

While visiting the Uffizi gallery in Italy on a trip to Europe in the summer of 1970, Schorr began to formulate his idea of combining his love of cartoons with the techniques of the old masters.

In 1972, he entered the Philadelphia College of Art (now the University of the Arts) wanting to be a painter but was advised to pursue illustration.

== Career ==
Schorr started professional illustration work while still in college, and soon after graduating in 1976, he moved to New York City where he produced work for projects including album covers for AC/DC, movie posters for George Lucas and Francis Ford Coppola, and covers for Time magazine that now reside in the permanent collection of the Smithsonian National Portrait Gallery in Washington, DC.

By 1985 Schorr began making a concentrated effort to break away from illustration and focus on fine art painting. He was invited to show work in the 1986 landmark exhibition American Pop Culture Images Today at the Laforet Museum in Tokyo, Japan, along with notable artists Robert Williams, Suzanne Williams, Neon Park, Bob Zoell, Georganne Deen, Mark Mothersbaugh, Gary Panter, and his wife Kathy Staico Schorr, which in large part galvanized the “Lowbrow” and Pop Surrealism movements. Schorr continued to exhibit in group shows, but by the time of his wildly successful first solo show in 1992 at the Tamara Bane Gallery in Los Angeles he had severed all ties to illustration. Schorr and his wife relocated to Los Angeles in 1999. The so-called “Lowbrow” art movement that he and his contemporaries helped form almost 25 years ago is now a global phenomenon.

In 2008 Schorr's work was shown at the Laguna Art Museum as part of In the Land of Retinal Delights: The Juxtapoz Factor. His work has also been exhibited in three career retrospectives to date: Secret Mystic Rites 2001, Art and Culture Center, Hollywood, Florida, American Surreal, 2009, San Jose Museum of Art, San Jose, CA and Designed for Extinction, 2010, Otis Ben Maltz Gallery, Los Angeles, CA.

Schorr's work has been featured in many books and periodicals on the arts, including Juxtapoz as well as the documentary film The Treasures of Long Gone John. Three monographs on his work, Secret Mystic Rites (1998), Dreamland (2004), and American Surreal have been published by Last Gasp.

=== Clash of Holidays controversy ===
Clash of Holidays caused a scandal when it was exhibited in 2002, when South Florida civil leaders accused Schorr of blasphemy and others, raising this as an issue over artistic freedom.

A retrospective for Schorr entitled, Secret Mystic Rites: Todd Schorr Retrospective, was organized by the Art and Culture Center of Hollywood, Florida, on December 14, 2001–February 17, 2002. A huge controversy immediately ensued due to the museum's invitation for the exhibition which depicted Shorr's Clash of Holidays painting. The "museum managers mailed out about 4000 post cards showing Clash of the Holidays. The outrage started there. Clash of the Holidays depicts... Santa Claus and the Easter Bunny locked in mortal combat. Santa's wielding an ax. The rabbit has a knife. Rudolph the Red-Nosed Reindeer and Baby Jesus, who's munching on an ear from a chocolate rabbit, stand by."

"It was just a joke, really, like lot of my paintings that poke fun at things, comments Schorr, who completed the piece in 2000, then sold it to Courteney Cox of Friends television show fame." Initially, "leaders of Art and Culture Center of Hollywood...had decided to take down the painting that had drawn nasty phone calls, e-mails, and criticism from the City Commission." The controversy died down after meetings between local, state, and museum officials concerning artist's rights, free speech and censorship.

=== The Treasures of Long Gone John ===
In 2006, a feature-length documentary titled The Treasures of Long Gone John, was released. The film is described as "A chronicle of the eccentric art and musical obsessions of indie record producer and self-described 'anti-mogul,' Long Gone John". The film features Schorr, Long Gone John and other Lowbrow artists as it chronicles the progress of the commissioned painting A Pirate's Treasure Dream using time-lapse photography.

=== American Surreal ===
Schorr was given a career retrospective entitled American Surreal at the San Jose Museum of Art in San Jose, CA, from June 20-September 16, 2009. The exhibit covered the entirety of the museum's first-floor exhibit space and showcased Todd's work from the mid-1980s through to his two most recent paintings, The World We Live In and When Fairy Tales Collide, which were finished in early 2009. The retrospective was accompanied by a third book of Schorr's work, also entitled American Surreal, published by Last Gasp.

== Works ==
=== Selected artworks ===
- 2009 The World We Live In (acrylic on canvas, 84" x 38")
- 2007 Ape Worship (acrylic on canvas, 96" x 120")
- 2006 A Pirate's Treasure Dream (acrylic on canvas, 72" x 96")
- 2002 Into the Valley of Finks and Weirdos (acrylic on canvas, 60" x 84")
- 2000 The Spectre of Cartoon Appeal (acrylic on canvas, 60" x 84")
- 2000 The Spectre of Monster Appeal (acrylic on canvas, 60" x 84")

=== Exhibitions ===
- 1986 American Pop Culture Images Today, LaForet Museum, Tokyo, Japan
- 1988 Sideshow, Tamara Bane Gallery, Los Angeles, CA
- 1988 Summer Solution, Psychedelic Solution, New York, NY
- 1992 Todd Schorr: New Paintings, Tamara Bane Gallery, Los Angeles, CA
- 1993 Graf/X, Bess Cutler Gallery, New York, NY
- 1994 Todd Schorr: New Works, Tamara Bane Gallery, Los Angeles, CA
- 1997 Recent Works, Merry Karnowsky Gallery, Los Angeles, CA
- 1998 Plundered Obsessions, Merry Karnowsky Gallery, Los Angeles, CA
- 2000 Spectre of Influence, Merry Karnowsky Gallery, Los Angeles, CA
- 2002 Secret Mystic Rites: Todd Schorr Retrospective, Art and Culture Center of Hollywood, Hollywood, FL
- 2003 An Alien in the Land of Make Believe, Merry Karnowsky Gallery, Los Angeles, CA
- 2005 The Golden Age of Hypocrisy, Jonathan LeVine Gallery, New York, NY
- 2006 Suggested Reality, Mondo Bizzarro Gallery, Rome, Italy
- 2009 The World We Live In, Merry Karnowsky Gallery, Los Angeles, CA
- 2009 American Surreal (retrospective), San Jose Museum of Art, San Jose, CA
- 2010 Art From the New World, Bristol City Museum & Art Gallery, Bristol, England
- 2010 Designed for Extinction (retrospective), Otis Ben Maltz Gallery, Los Angeles, CA
- 2011 Todd Schorr, Spacejunk Art Centers, Bourg-Saint-Maurice, Grenoble, Lyon and Bayonne, France
- 2012 Neverlasting Miracles, Merry Karnowsky Gallery, Los Angeles, CA

=== Publications ===
- Neverlasting Miracles, Last Gasp, (2017).
- American Surreal, Last Gasp, (2009).
- Dreamland, Last Gasp, (2004).
- Secret Mystic Rites, Last Gasp, (1998).

=== Selected articles ===
- Dangerous Ink Magazine, August 2007.
- Nude Magazine, May 2007.
- Juxtapoz Magazine, May 2006.
- Xyrurah Magazine, 2006.
- Wow Magazine, December 2005.
- Juxtapoz Magazine, September 2005.
- Juxtapoz Magazine, January 2004.
- Score Magazine, January 2003.

== See also ==
- Merry Karnowsky
- Lowbrow (art movement)
- Juxtapoz
- Long Gone John
