= Junko Mizuno =

Japanese manga artist

Junko Mizuno 水野純子
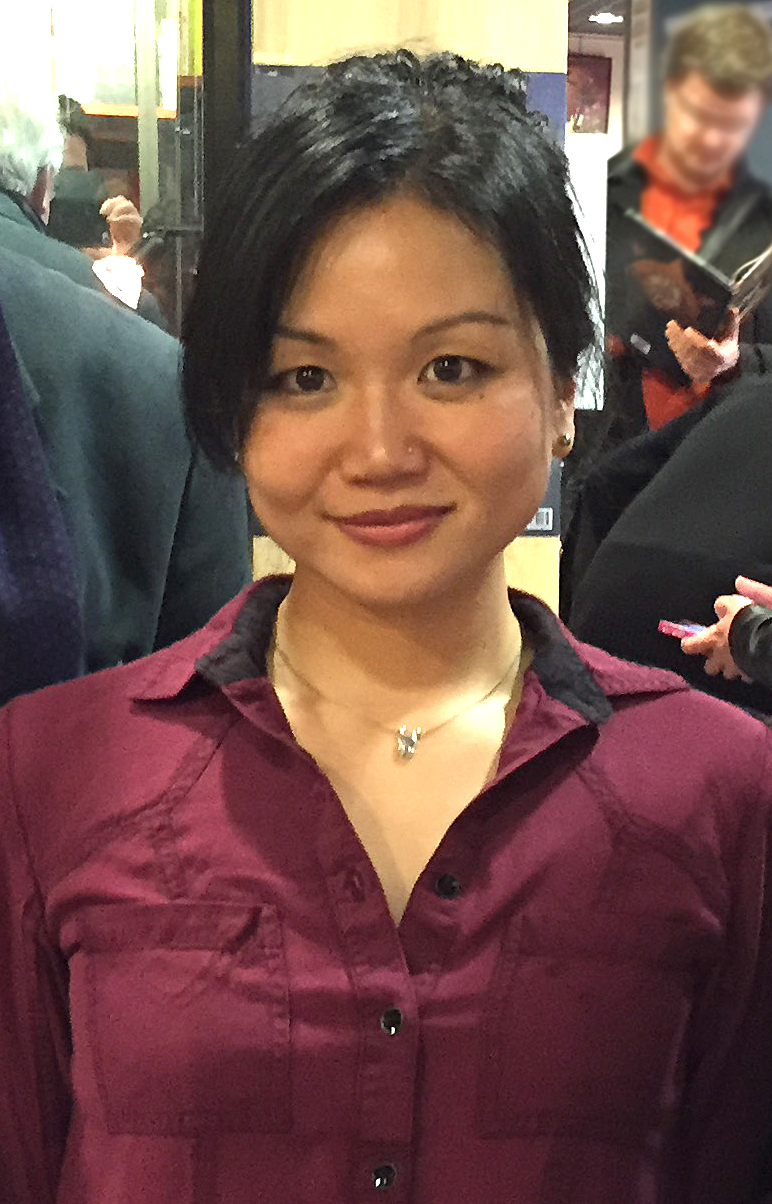
- Junko Mizuno in Paris, 2014
- Born: Mizuno Junko; 27 May 1973 Tokyo, Japan
- Area: Artist
- Notable works: Pure Trance

Junko Mizuno (水野純子, Mizuno Junko) is a Japanese manga artist. Her drawing style is often termed as Gothic kawaii or kawaii noir style.

== Art style ==
Mizuno's drawing style, which mixes childish sweetness and cuteness with terror and erotica, has often been termed a Gothic kawaii or kawaii noir style. However, Mizuno has stated that she does not feel comfortable about those terms, as she doesn't want to label her work with words because it keeps changing and is influenced by many different genres.

Mizuno has stated that her work is influenced by shōjo manga works; this influence is exhibited through her use of bright colorization and the large eyes she provides for her characters. Her art has a decidedly pop-art and psychedelic flair, and a sizable proportion of her published work is colored, rather than the black and white format typical of most Japanese comics.

A part of Mizuno's oeuvre revolves around fairy tales, showing titles such as Cinderalla, Princess Mermaid and Hansel&Gretel. The story behind this is that after the release of Pure Trance, Mizuno was approached by a Kinokuniya publisher who was interested in working with her because of her unique style. However, this publisher did not like the story of Pure Trance as it differed a lot from mainstream comics at the time. Because of this, he ask that she revise the original Cinderella tale in order to prove her story-telling skill and receive approval to write her own stories. Mizuno has stated that as she was just starting out her career as a professional artist, she decided to take the opportunity, and that while in hindsight she was not very comfortable with the situation, it was a good experience for her.

Mizuno has participated in the Angoulême International Comics Festival and The Lakes International Comic Art Festival. In 2007 Mizuno's work was on display at the Merry Karnowsky Gallery in Los Angeles, in an exhibit titled Heart Throb and at Gallery Nucleus in Alhambra, California in an exhibit titled Tender Succubus. In 2014, Mizuno held an exhibition of her work titled Belle: the Art of Junko Mizuno at the Atomica Gallery in London.

== Merchandise ==
In addition to her comics, Mizuno designs T-shirts, calendars, postcards, and other collectibles. Some of her designs were used in the documentary series Japanorama, which aired on BBC. Mizuno also provides the art that accompanies the horoscopes in Shojo Beat magazine. Last Gasp and Viz Comics are the English-language publishers of her work.

A handful of objects have been produced from Junko Mizuno's designs. These include vinyl figurines (produced by Fewture Models/Art Storm USA), plush animals, stationery (produced by Dark Horse USA), and original artwork T-shirts (made by Fine Clothing). In early 2009 Mizuno Garden launched a line of erotic products such as condoms and lube. In addition, the Viz editions of her graphic novels include stickers and postcards. In 2008, Hasbro announced a limited edition of My Little Pony based on her design for a charity auction.

== Works ==
- Pure Trance, (East Press, 1998)
- Cinderalla, (Koushinsya, 2000); English ed. Viz, (2002).
- "The Life of Momongo," story by Norimizu Ameya, Comic Cue, (East Press, 1998); reprinted in Chikao Shiratori, (ed.), Secret Comics Japan, (Viz, 2000).
- Pure Trance, (East Press [Tokyo], 1998); English ed. Last Gasp, (2005).
- Hansel & Gretel, (Koushinsya, 2000); English ed. Viz, (2003).
- Junko Mizuno's Hell Babies, (Kenichi Kawai/Pan-Exotica, 2001).
- Princess Mermaid, (Bunkasha, 2002); English ed. Viz, (2003).
- Collector's File 002: Junko Mizuno's Illustration Book, (Viz, 2003).
- Little Fluffy Gigolo Pelu, (Enterbrain, 2003-2005); English ed. Last Gasp (2009-).
- Ravina the Witch, (Éditions Soleil, 2014).

== Bibliography ==
- "Junko Mizuno's Fantasy World" (Interview conducted by Pushead), Juxtapoz #60 (January 2006), pp. 54–57.
- "The Junko Mizuno Interview" (Interview conducted by Ema Nakao; questions and research by Kristy Valenti), The Comics Journal #273 (January 2006), pp. 117–130.
- "Interview with Junko Mizuno" (Interview conducted by Izumi Evers, translated into English by Andy Nakatani), in Cinderalla, pp. 130–135.
- "Interview: Junko Mizuno" (Interview conducted by Lora-Elly Vannieuwenhuysen), BCM #22 (December 2014), p. 56.
