= Merry Karnowsky =

American artist

Merry Akane Karnowsky is a Los Angeles art dealer and gallerist of Japanese and Polish-German ancestry.

Karnowsky was born in Eastern Washington State and educated at Pitzer College - Claremont, California. In 1997, she opened The Merry Karnowsky Gallery in Los Angeles, California, and was influential in the underground "Lowbrow (art movement)," pop surrealism, and Street Art scene, with exhibitions by Shepard Fairey, Camille Rose Garcia, Mercedes Helnwein and Todd Schorr.

== Sources ==
- Juxtapoz Magazine (ISSN 1077-8411), "Insiders: Merry Karnowsky", Volume 14, Number 6, June 2007, pg. 44–45.
- Nylon Guys Magazine (ISSN 1931-2784), "Sifting Through The Madness", Summer 2007, pg. 30.

== Further information ==
- Merry Karnowsky Gallery
