= Leonard Koren =

American artist and writer (born 1948)

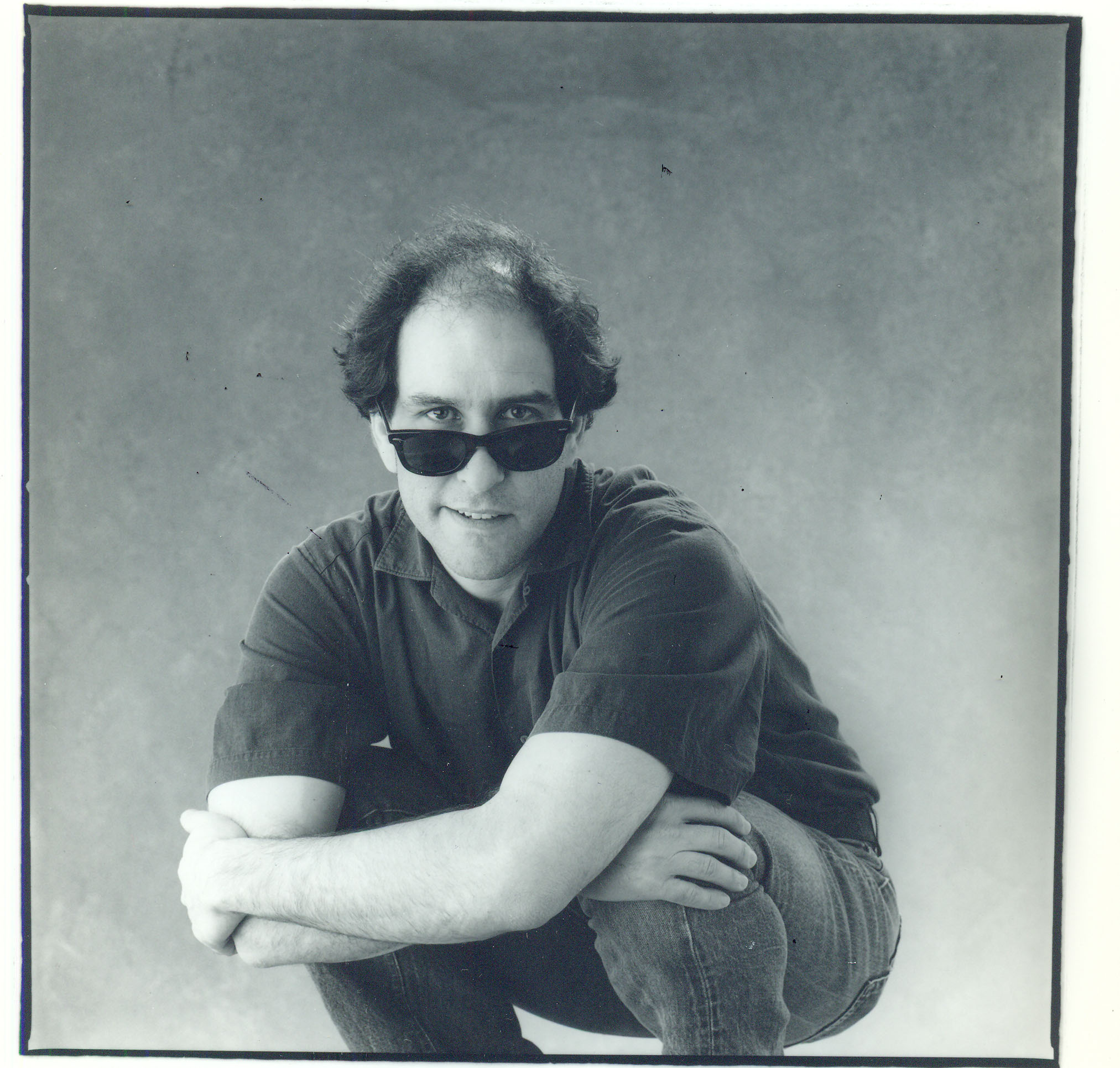
- Koren in San Francisco, 1985
- Born: January 4, 1948 (age 78) New York City, U.S.
- Occupation: Writer; artist
- Education: University of California, Los Angeles (MArch)
- Genre: Aesthetics

Website
- leonardkoren.com

Leonard Koren (born January 4, 1948) is an American artist, aesthetics expert, and writer.

== Early life and education ==
Leonard Koren was born in New York City in 1948 and raised in Los Angeles. He attended UCLA, graduating with a master's degree in architecture and urban planning in 1972.

== Career ==
In 1969, Koren co-founded the Los Angeles Fine Arts Squad, a mural painting group. After graduation, he worked as an artist in Los Angeles, focusing on bathing environments.

In 1976, Koren founded WET magazine, a periodical dedicated to gourmet bathing. The magazine was influential in the development of postmodern aesthetics. In 1981, WET ceased publication, and Koren moved to Japan, where he wrote several works on aesthetics. From 1983 through 1986, he produced a column on cultural anthropology for a Japanese magazine.

Koren wrote Wabi-Sabi for Artists, Designers, Poets and Philosophers (1994), which helped bring the Japanese concept of wabi-sabi into Western aesthetic theory.

== Personal life ==
Koren lives in San Francisco.
