= The Molesworth Gallery =

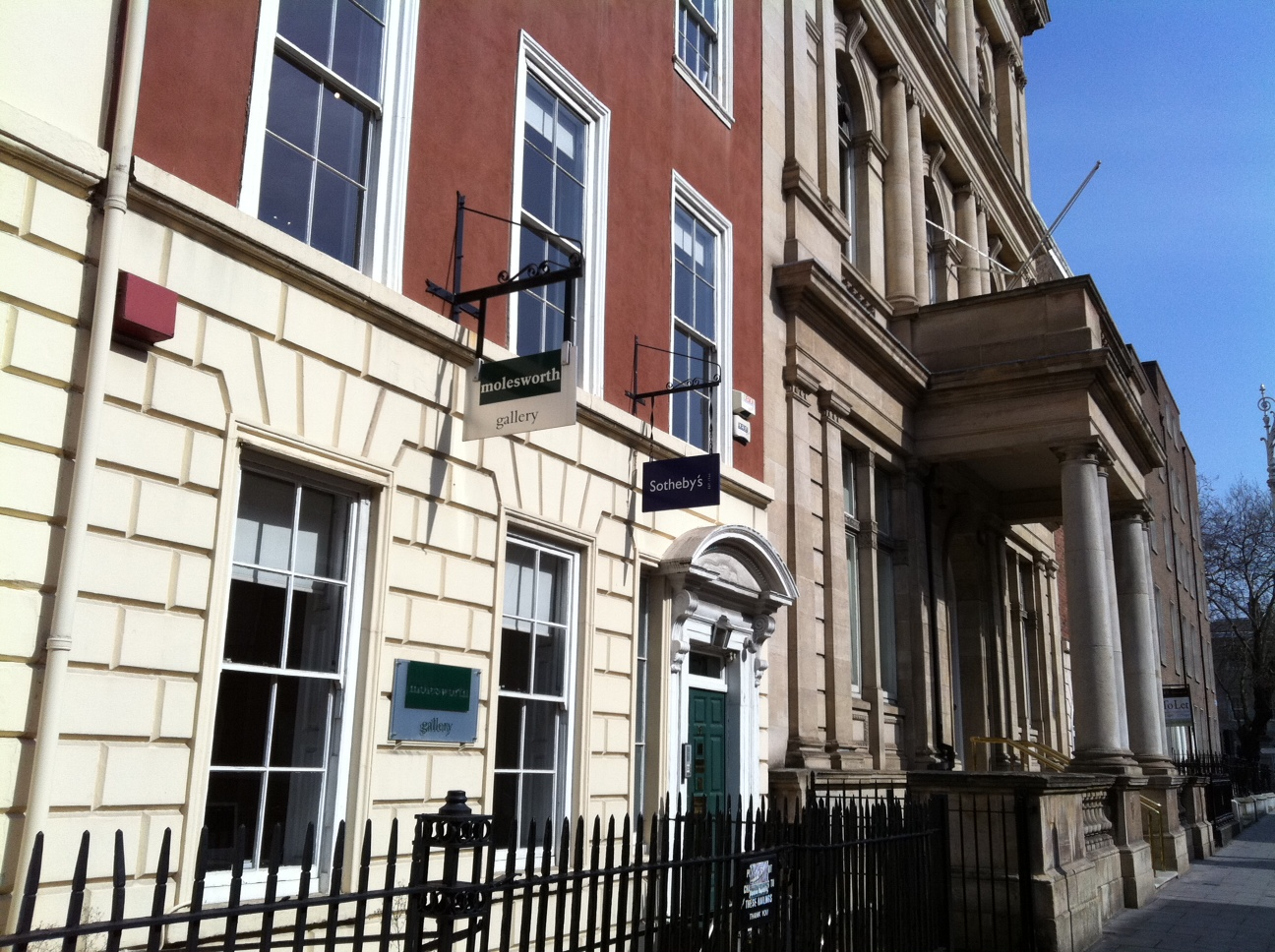
- Location: 16 Molesworth Street, Dublin 2, Ireland
- Director: Ronan Lyons
- Website: www.molesworthgallery.com

The Molesworth Gallery is a contemporary art gallery in Dublin.

It hosts eight solo and two curated group exhibitions annually at its gallery space in Dublin's city centre. Exhibitions are documented in gallery publications ranging from brochures to hardback books. It also collaborates with arts centres and museums to maximise public access to the work of its artists, as well as promoting them at international art fairs. The gallery covers the ground and first floors of a large Georgian house. A changing display of work by gallery artists may be viewed in its upstairs exhibition space. The gallery was founded in 2000 by Teresa Crowley and Ronan Lyons. Teresa Crowley was appointed Director of The Hunt Museum, Limerick, in March of 2024.

== Artists ==
- Catherine Barron
- Zsolt Basti
- Robert Bates
- Michael Beirne
- Shane Berkery
- Helen Blake
- John Boyd
- Cristina Bunello
- J.P. Donleavy
- Gabhann Dunne
- Conor Foy
- Mercedes Helnwein
- Ronnie Hughes
- John Kindness
- Vera Klute ARHA
- Francis Matthews
- Maeve McCarthy RHA
- Cian McLoughlin
- Sean Molloy
- Philip Moss
- Mick O'Dea
- Sheila Pomeroy
- Gareth Reid
