= Shane Berkery =

Irish-Japanese contemporary artist

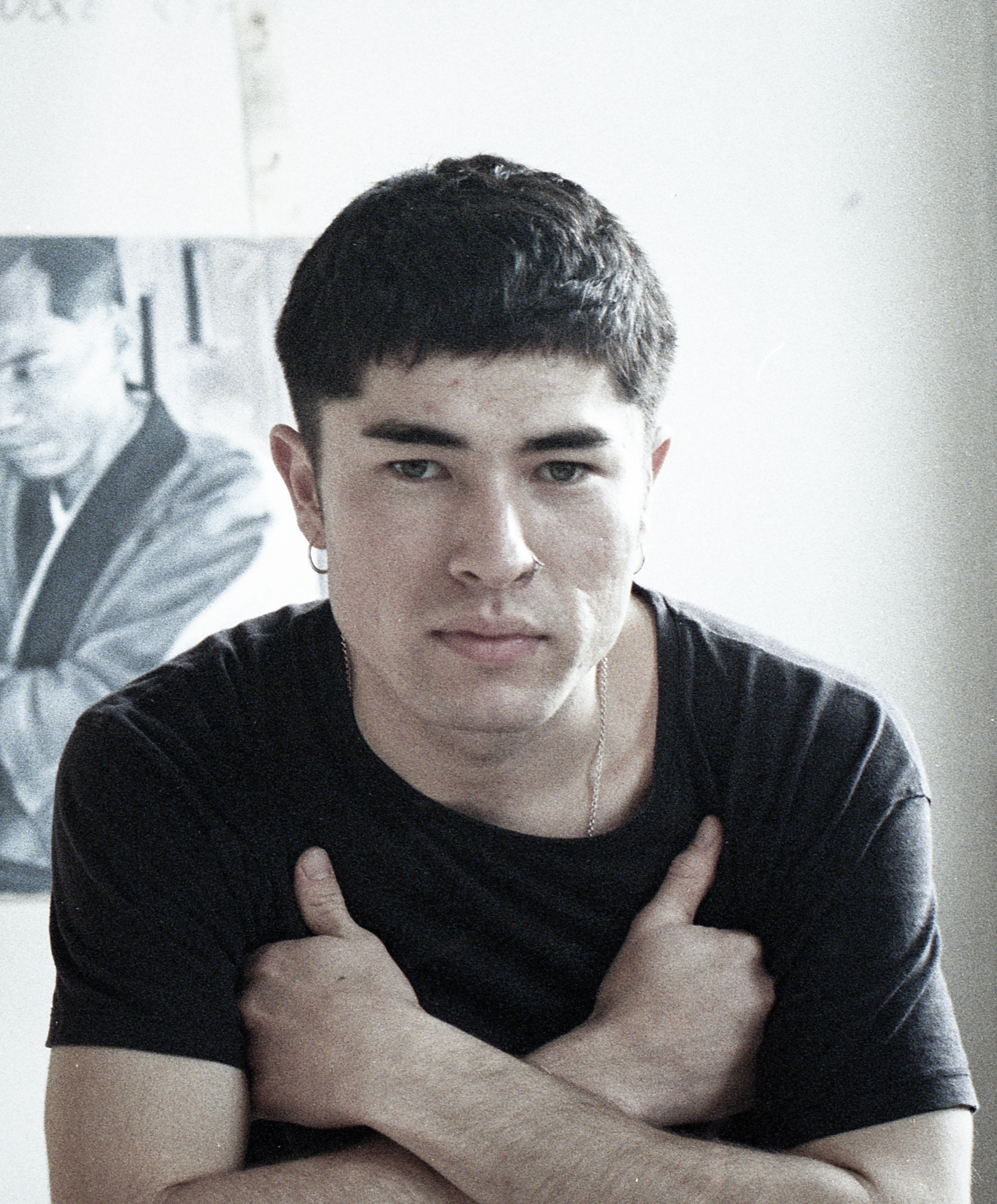
Berkery in his studio

Shane Keisuke Berkery (シェーン・ケイスケ・バーカリー; /ˈbɜːrkri/ BURK-ree; born 9 April 1992) is an Irish-Japanese contemporary artist based in Dublin, Ireland. His cultural background has been a major influence on his work and is a frequent theme in his paintings. Berkery primarily works out of his studio in Dublin.

== Life and career ==
Berkery experienced controversy in 2015 when he submitted a nude of the college director for the graduation exhibition at National College of Art and Design in protest of how the college was being run. The painting was later withdrawn.

In 2013, singer Sinead O' Connor commissioned Berkery to paint a mural of Hindu god Vishnu in her home in Bray, Ireland. O' Connor originally planned to use Berkery's image for the cover of her album in summer 2014, titled The Vishnu Room but the album was later retitled, without reference to Vishnu.

== Exhibitions ==
- Solo exhibition 'Cave Paintings' at Molesworth Gallery, Dublin, Ireland - June 2021
- Solo presentation at Start Art Fair, Saatchi Gallery, London, United Kingdom - September 2018
- RHA 187th Annual Exhibition at Royal Hibernian Academy, Dublin, Ireland - May 2017

== Recognition and awards ==
- Shortlisted for 2019 Zurich Portrait Award, National Gallery of Ireland - September 2019
- Named in "Five of the best art exhibitions to see" in The Irish Times - March 2018
- Shortlisted for 2017 Hennessy Portrait Award, National Gallery of Ireland - September 2017
- Painting of US President Donald Trump appeared in The Irish Times and Irish Independent newspapers - January 2017
- Named in the "10 Irish painters under 30 to watch" by RTÉ Culture - January 2017
- Winner of the Whyte's Award at the Royal Hibernian Academy annual exhibition - March 2016
- Winner of the Hennessy Craig Award at the RHA annual exhibition - April 2016
- Painting purchased by the Office of Public Works (OPW) and placed in the Irish State Art Collection - February 2016
- National University of Ireland (NUI) Art and Design Prize - November 2015
