= Mercedes Helnwein =

Austrian artist

Mercedes Helnwein (born November 12, 1979) is an artist, writer and filmmaker. She was born in Vienna, Austria and primarily lives and works in Los Angeles.

== Early life ==
Helnwein was born in Vienna, Austria. Her father is Austro-Irish artist Gottfried Helnwein. She and her brothers, Cyril, Ali, and Wolfgang Amadeus, often modeled for their father's work as children, whose works often included nightmarish depictions of war and exploitation. As children, Mercedes and her siblings were given the freedom to express themselves, and she developed a style distinctively hers.

== Art ==
Helnwein has no formal art training, but, growing up, she interacted with art figures such as Andy Warhol and Keith Haring through her father's connections. She creates large-scale drawings, most of which are done with black pencil, colored pencils, or pastels. Helnwein's art debuted in 2000, with one of her first group exhibitions curated in Downtown Los Angeles by actor Jason Lee. In 2007 Helnwein's New York solo exhibition debut, Untitled (Self-Portrait With Ribbon) at Bespoke Gallery. Rachel Wolff, writing for Vulture, suggested Helnwein's "immaculately executed drawings play out like dramatically lit, attractively cast indie flicks."

Helnwein has exhibited over ten solo exhibits and over a dozen group exhibits. In 2005, Damien Hirst acquired Helnwein's collections "East of Eden," "Strange Days," and "Whistling Past the Graveyard" which were then presented at A Gallery in London. The Molesworth Gallery hosted its first solo exhibit of Helnwein's work in 2007. The Molesworth Gallery hosted its second solo exhibit of Helnwein's work in 2009, "Whistling past the graveyard." Helnwein's "Temptation to be Good," a series of drawings in oil pastels, was exhibited at the Merry Karnowsky Gallery in 2010, and in 2012, Helnwein's work was again shown at Merry Karnowsky Gallery in her solo show, "Make It Dark." The Molesworth Gallery, in 2014, exhibited Helnwein's "No Way Home," and it also made available her monograph of the same name. In 2017, Edward Hopper House held a solo exhibit of Helnwein's oil pastel, "Chaos Theory."

Helnwein also contributed art for stickers included in Beck's 2006 album, The Information.

== Writing ==
In 2004, Helnwein's travelogue, "Devil Got Religion," covered the 15-day road trip with Alex Prager and Beth Riesgraf for their "America Motel" installation. In 2008 her debut novel, The Potential Hazards of Hester Day, was published by Simon & Schuster.

Discussing her 2021 novel, Slingshot, Helnwein says, "The secrets of suburbia, the surface fakeness, have always been interesting to me."
