= Barbara Lazaroff =

American interior designer and restaurateur

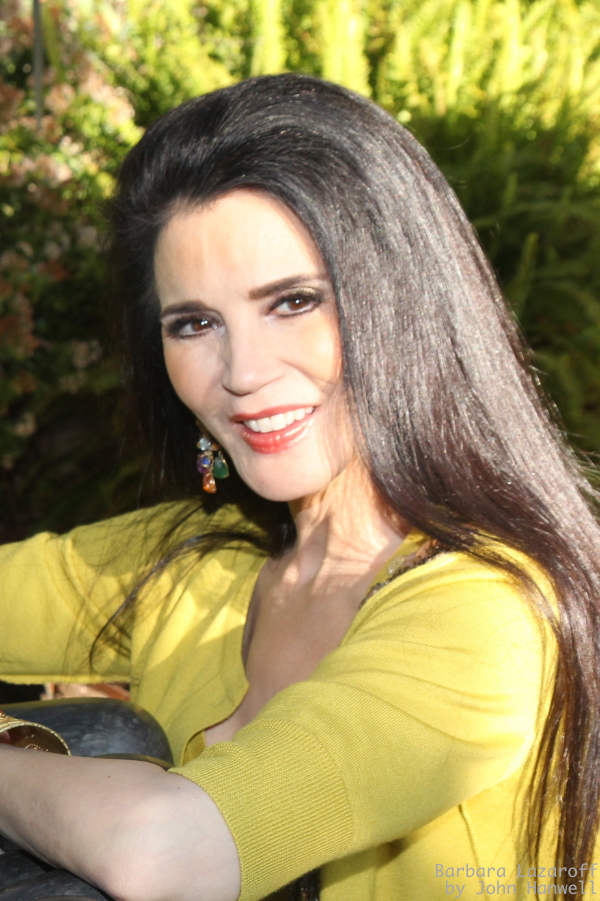
- Born: New York City, U.S.
- Occupation: Commercial/residential designer; Restaurateur; Co-founder of Wolfgang Puck brand
- Partner: Wolfgang Puck (1983–2003; divorced); John Hanwell (partner since 2004)
- Children: 2
- Website: barbaralazaroff.com

Barbara Ellen Lazaroff is an American interior designer and restaurateur, and the co-founder of the Wolfgang Puck brand. She has been involved with several women's business and leadership organizations.

== Early life ==
Lazaroff was born in the Bronx, New York City, and started her education there, later moving to Los Angeles. Her studies included theater set design and lighting. She moved on to biochemistry, psychology, and work in biomedical. In the book, How They Met by Nancy Cobb, she and Wolfgang tell the story that they met while she was out with a friend at a club in 1979, and she appealed to him to get her away from a guy who “had too many lines.”

== Career ==
Lazaroff's first restaurant design was the original Spago in West Hollywood, California, which opened in 1982. It was created and run in collaboration with her business partner and then-husband, Wolfgang Puck. The magazine Interiors wrote that Lazaroff "transformed a neglected shack above the Sunset Strip into what became the prototype for many California restaurants; a sparkling exhibition kitchen, art-filled interior, and easy indoor-outdoor flow of space." This original Spago location was closed on March 31, 2001, when the building required costly renovation.

In 1983 Lazaroff and Puck opened Chinois on Main in Santa Monica, also designed by Lazaroff. Lazaroff spent two years remodeling the former punk rock club into what People Magazine described as a "fuchsia, black and celadon-green oriental fantasy." In 1991 Lazaroff designed Granita, the fourth Los Angeles restaurant she did with Puck. It was their first restaurant in Malibu. Granita closed in 2005 because Puck and Lazaroff decided not to renew the lease on that property.

When Spago Beverly Hills, also designed by Lazaroff, opened in 1997, Los Angeles Times restaurant critic S. Irene Virbila called it "spectacular," saying "The site of the old Bistro Garden has been entirely reinvented by designer Barbara Lazaroff, Puck’s wife and partner, and architect Stephen Jones." Spago Beverly Hills was fully redesigned in 2012, eliminating Lazaroff's initial decor.

Lazaroff's other designs have included now-former Wolfgang Puck Cafés in the United States, Canada and Japan featuring a signature Café design of triangular fused glass sconces, colorful geometric mosaic floors and walls, and Lazaroff's custom “pizza chairs” for which she won, with Wolfgang Puck, the Hot Concept award from Nation’s Restaurant News. Her other restaurant designs also included the following co-owned restaurants, now closed: Chinois Las Vegas, Spago Tokyo, and the Playboy Club Japan in Tokyo.

In May 1997, Lazaroff and Puck owned 36 restaurants together, with ObaChine in Seattle, featuring Southeast Asian cuisine and decor, being the 36th. At the close of 2019, Lazaroff co-owns Spago Beverly Hills, Spago Las Vegas and Spago Maui, Chinois on Main, Trattoria del Lupo, Postrio Bar & Grill, and Wolfgang Puck Bar & Grill in Las Vegas. She is also a partner in CUT Beverly Hills.

Outside of the WP properties, in 1988 Lazaroff designed Shane's (Bel-Air), which featured Southwestern food.

Lazaroff is a founding member of the International Association of Women Chefs and Restaurateurs (1993). She was inducted into the National Association of Women Business Owners Hall of Fame on March 24, 2000.

She appeared on The Joan Rivers Show.

In addition to her restaurant and design work, Lazaroff holds film credits as a producer for the 2013 documentary Femme, which featured 100 interviews with prominent women from around the world. She co-authored the book Wishes for a Mother's Heart with Tricia LaVoice, and was featured in RenWomen: What Modern Renaissance Women Have to Teach Us About Living Rich Fulfilling Lives, co-written by Dale Griffths Stamos and W. Scott Griffiths.

== Personal life ==
Lazaroff married Puck in 1983 and divorced in 2003, They have two sons. She is Jewish.

== Awards ==
- 1994—James Beard, Humanitarian of the Year [Lazaroff & Puck]
- 1994—Assopiastrelle Design Award, Association of Ceramic Tile & Refractory Manufacturers, Italy
- 1995—Hospitality Design Award, Dupont Antron
- 1996—The Ray Bradbury Creativity Award, presented by Woodbury University Library Associates.
- 2005—Spirit of Beverly Hills Award
- 2011—Alliance for Housing & Healing's Visionary Award
- 2013—Big Brothers Big Sisters Of Greater Los Angeles Honoree, Innovation Award
