= Little Fluffy Gigolo Pelu =

Japanese manga series

- First volume cover as published by Last Gasp

ファンシージゴロ ペル (Fanshī Jigoro Peru)
- Genre: Comedy
- Manga
- Written by: Junko Mizuno
- Published by: Enterbrain
- English publisher: NA: Last Gasp
- Magazine: Comic Beam
- Original run: March 24, 2003 – January 31, 2005
- Volumes: 3

Little Fluffy Gigolo Pelu (Japanese: ファンシージゴロ ペル, Hepburn: Fanshī Jigoro Peru; also known as Fancy Gigolo Pelu) is a Japanese manga series written and illustrated by Junko Mizuno and published by Enterbrain. The series has been licensed in North America and France where the first volume received mostly positive reviews.

== Story ==
A candid and naive cotton-ball like alien Pelu leaves his home world, the all female planet Kotobuki, and travels to Earth to find love and to have a child. However, Earth women view him as an entertaining pet. He drifts in and out of their lives, solving their problems in an attempt to woo the women of Earth.

== Development ==
Junko Mizuno initially had a general outline of the story but did not know how long it would take. She wrote down the storyboards for the first three to four chapters and had precise views on sequences and characters. She usually produced 16 pages per month and thought that while all her previous main characters were females it would be interesting to have a non-female character.

In a 2010 interview, she revealed that the character of "Pelu" is based on "Moja-ko", a character created by Fujiko Fujio, author of Doraemon. Another influence for Little Fluffy Gigolo Pelu was the film series Tora-san, about a lovelorn wanderer. Some of the stories were inspired by melodramas for housewives.

Patrick Macias translated the manga into English.

== Publication ==
The series is written and illustrated by Junko Mizuno. It was serialized in Enterbrain's monthly seinen magazine Comic Beam and the serial chapters collected into three tankōbon, with the first one released on March 24, 2003, and the third on January 31, 2005.

Outside Japan, the manga has been licensed in North America by Last Gasp and in France by IMHO.

No.	Original release date	Original ISBN	English release date	English ISBN
1	March 24, 2003	4-7577-1315-0	September 1, 2009	978-0-86719-700-6
The Naked Enka Singer; The Sassy Girl and the Bad Boy; Beach Maidens; The Mysterious High School
2	April 24, 2004	4-7577-1807-1	July 1, 2013	0867197439
3	January 31, 2005	4-7577-2144-7	-	—

== Reception ==
Jason Thompson felt that Pelu is the "most extreme form of Mizuno's cute but dumpy men" and a secondary character in the manga while the stories are some of Mizuno's best.

David Welsh in The Comics Reporter stated that Pelu's quest is "just a framing device that allows Mizuno to examine the resourcefulness and resilience of women, even kind of awful women. It also allows her to play with different tropes of different styles of manga storytelling" and described the work as creepy, cute, and, he suspects, completely sincere. He asserted that you get your money's worth with the illustrations of Little Fluffy Gigolo Pelu, along with a passion "beyond craft and imagination" within the pages.

Scott Green for Ain't It Cool News asserted that Little Fluffy Gigolo Pelu "sets up an infinity effect of laughing at something terribly bleak, then feeling bad about finding mirth in sorrow, then laughing at the absurdity of it all, and so on" and concluded that while Junko Mizuno is a divisive creator, readers needing to "get" her work to appreciate it, the manga features enough dire absurdity that it will force readers to laugh.

Joseph Luster felt that the combination of Mizuno's "sexy/nasty/classy artwork" and "otherworldly storytelling" is a potent combination. Luster recommended Little Fluffy Gigolo Pelu as being a good place to start with Mizuno's works, as it is accessible but with "something more" giving a frame to the work.

Erin Finnegan described the story as "trippy, disturbing, and funny", and felt it could continue forever. Finnegan was disappointed that the science fiction themes of the story were muted after Pelu came to Earth, until the space hippo made another appearance.

Katherine Dacey described the story as being surprisingly poignant, noting that although Mizuno's works aim for shock value by having "cute characters engaged in degenerate behavior", that the shock value here supports dramatic and thematic functions, as a reflection of how childlessness is portrayed in popular culture, "as if being childless were worse than being afflicted with a terminal disease".

The French cultural magazine Les Inrockuptibles described the art as both psychedelic and naive, the roundness recalling 70's girls comics and finding the universe to be completely "kawaii". However the sugar-coated style and gentle text hide a rude and ruthless world. The reviewer asserted that behind its pop aspect Little Fluffy Gigolo Pelu is an acerbic social criticism with Junko Mizuno presenting a dark vision of the current world and the layers of cuteness make human vileness even more apparent.

Benjamin Roure in Bodoï described the first volume as "original and uplifting" with childish and rounded drawings hiding the violent background and an impish tone that will reserve the work to adults.

A. Perroud for BD Gest criticized the work for being "Pikachu meeting the Shadoks told à la Arthur de Pins" with plenty of cuteness that would please Hello Kitty devotees, and absurd scenes and unfathomable dialogs which succeed without logic.
