= Wolfgang Puck =

Austrian-American chef and restaurateur (born 1949)

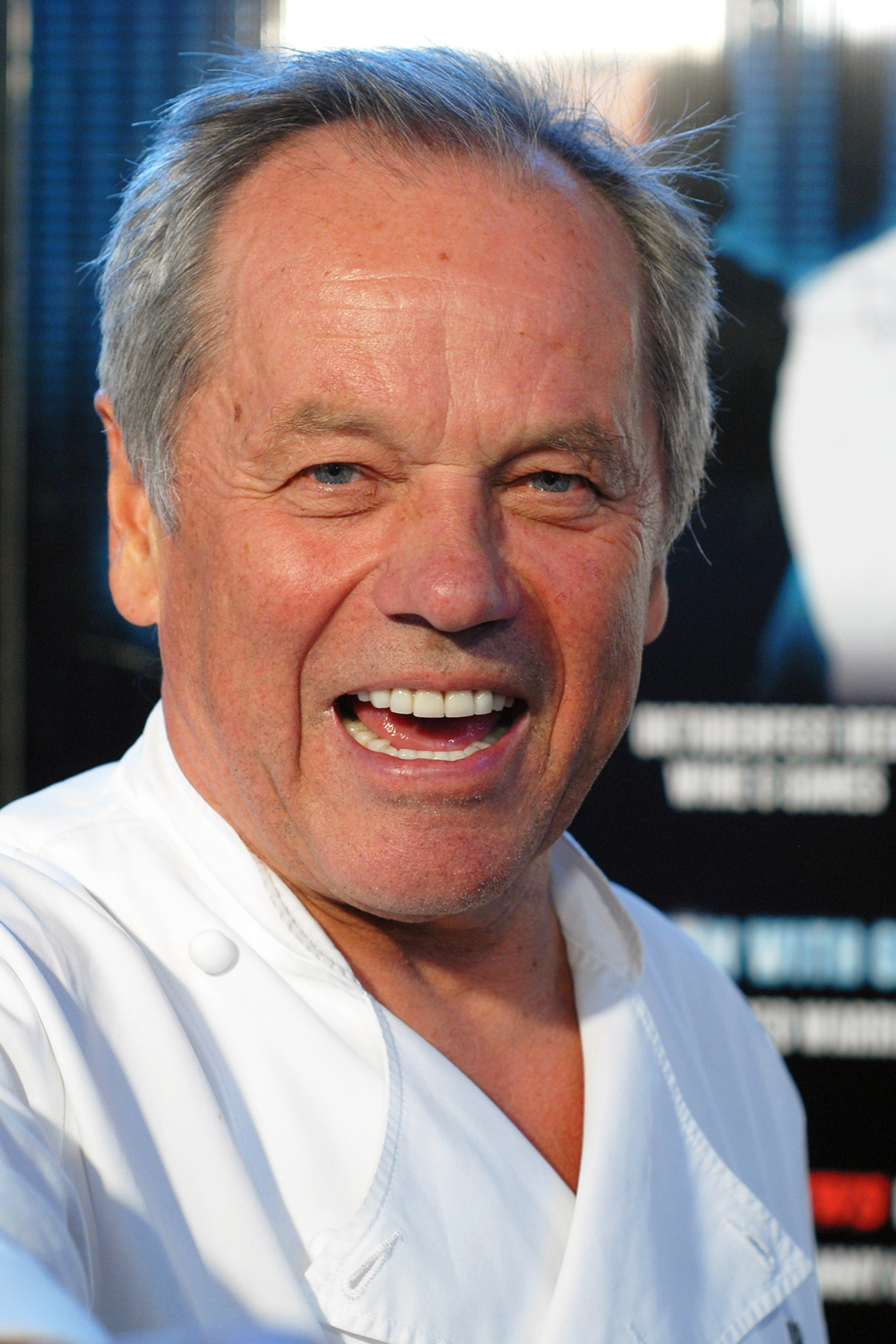
- Puck in 2012
- Born: Wolfgang Topitschnig; July 8, 1949 (age 77); Sankt Veit an der Glan, Austria
- Spouses: Marie France Trouillot (m. 1975; div. 1980) Barbara Lazaroff (m. 1983; div. 2003) Gelila Assefa (m. 2007)
- Children: 4
- Culinary career
- Cooking style: California; French; fusion

Wolfgang Johannes Puck (né Topfschnig; born July 8, 1949) is an Austrian and American chef and restaurateur.

== Early life ==
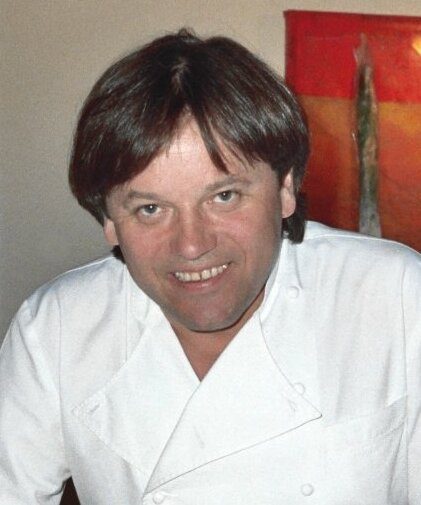
Puck in 1988

Puck was born in Sankt Veit an der Glan, Austria. He learned cooking from his mother, who was a pastry chef. He took the surname of his stepfather, Josef Puck, after his mother's remarriage. The marriage produced two younger sisters and a younger brother.

== Career ==
Puck trained as an apprentice under Raymond Thuilier at L'Oustau de Baumanière in Les Baux-de-Provence, at Hôtel de Paris in Monaco, and at Maxim's Paris before moving to the United States in 1973 at age 24. After two years at La Tour in Indianapolis, Puck moved to Los Angeles to become chef and part owner of Ma Maison restaurant.

Following the 1981 publication of his first cookbook, Modern French Cooking for the American Kitchen, which was based on his Ma Maison recipes, Puck opened the restaurant Spago on the Sunset Strip in 1982. Fifteen years later, in 1997, Puck and Barbara Lazaroff, his then-wife and business partner, moved the award-winning Spago to Beverly Hills. It has been recognized as one of the Top 40 Restaurants in the U.S. since 2004. The Infatuation wrote that "Spago made Wolfgang Puck the first (and maybe only) chef you and your grandma know by name."

In 1991, Puck opened his fourth restaurant, Granita, a seafood restaurant in Malibu, California. The restaurant closed in 2005.

Since 2003, Puck's recipes have been syndicated worldwide to newspapers and websites by Tribune Content Agency.

Wolfgang Puck is active in philanthropic endeavors and charitable organizations. He co-founded the Puck-Lazaroff Charitable Foundation in 1982. The foundation supports the annual American Wine & Food Festival which benefits Meals on Wheels; it has raised more than $15 million since its inception.

One of Wolfgang Puck's signature dishes at his original restaurant, Spago, is house-smoked salmon pizza.

== Personal life ==
Puck was married to interior designer Barbara Lazaroff from 1983 to 2003 and they have two sons, Cameron and Byron. Puck became a U.S. citizen in 1999. In 2007 Puck wed his third wife, Gelila Assefa, a model and designer from Ethiopia and they have two sons, Oliver and Alexander. In late 2023, Puck became a grandfather when Cameron's son Maxwell was born.

== Awards and honors ==
In 1993, Spago Hollywood was inducted into the Nation's Restaurant News Fine Dining Hall of Fame. The next year it received the James Beard Restaurant of the Year Award. In 2002, Puck received the 2001–2002 Daytime Emmy Award for Outstanding Service Show, Wolfgang Puck.

Spago Beverly Hills received a James Beard Foundation Outstanding Service Award in 2005. It was awarded two Michelin stars in the 2008 and 2009 Los Angeles Michelin Guide.

CUT Beverly Hills was awarded a Michelin star in 2007. In 2013, Puck was inducted into the Culinary Hall of Fame. In July 2016, CUT at the Marina Bay Sands, Singapore was awarded a Michelin Star.

On April 26, 2017, Puck received a star on the Hollywood Walk of Fame, for his work in the TV industry, located at 6801 Hollywood Boulevard.

On May 20, 2017, Puck was named the International Foodservice Manufacturers Association (IFMA) 2017 Gold Plate Winner.

In June 2022, Puck was recognized by the International Hospitality Institute on the Global 100 in Hospitality, as one of the 100 Most Powerful People in Global Hospitality.

== Restaurants ==
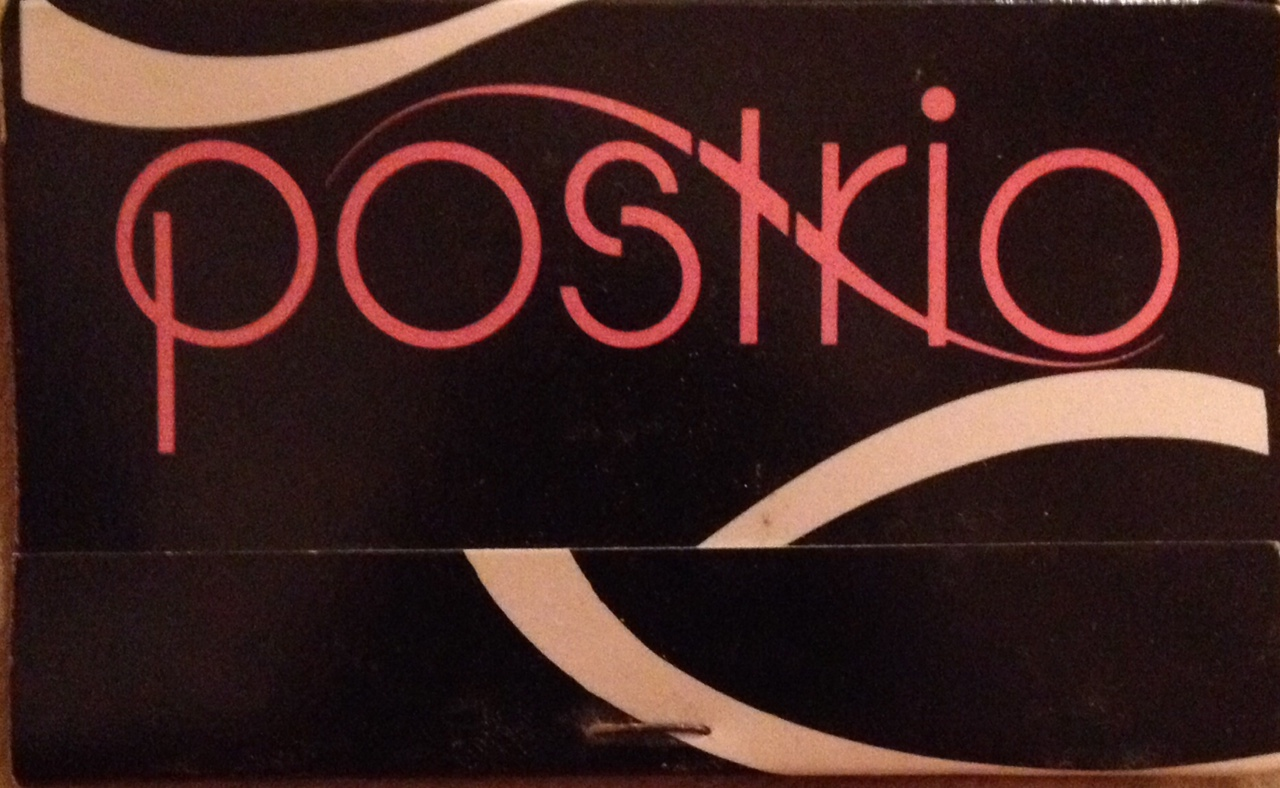
A matchbook from Postrio, circa 1995

- Spago, Puck's first restaurant opened on the Sunset Strip (1982) serving California cuisine but later relocated to Beverly Hills. There are five other Spago locations including Las Vegas, Budapest, Istanbul, Maui, and Marina Bay Sands, Singapore
- Caramá located at Mandalay Bay in Las Vegas.
- CUT in Beverly Hills, Las Vegas, London, New York City, Washington D.C., Bahrain, and at The Shoppes at Marina Bay Sands, Singapore
- Chinois on Main in Santa Monica, California.
- The Marketplace by Wolfgang Puck, El Dorado International Airport, Bogotá, Colombia
- III by Wolfgang Puck in Houston, Texas.
- Merois in West Hollywood, California
- Wolfgang Puck Kitchen in Shanghai and The Villages, Florida
- Wolfgang Puck's Kitchen Counter in Cancún International Airport
- Wolfgang Puck Kitchen + Bar in Kempegowda International Airport, Terminal 2.
- The Kitchen and The Kitchen Counter by Wolfgang Puck in Grand Rapids, Michigan
- Wolfgang Puck Kitchen + Bar at Vienna International Airport in Austria

=== Former restaurants ===
- Five-Sixty was located in Dallas and featured Asian-inspired New American cuisine. After 11 years, it closed in April 2020, due to the COVID-19 pandemic.
- Postrio, Innovative food that draws from a myriad of cultures, a wine list that has both breadth and depth. 1989–2009
- Granita, a seafood restaurant in Malibu, California. 1991–2005.
- Eureka, Restaurant & Brewery in West Los Angeles. 1990–1993.
- Lupo in Las Vegas, Nevada at Mandalay Bay
- Ospero in West Hollywood, California (2021–2024).
- Wolfgang Puck Bar & Grill in Disney Springs
- The Source, Washington, D.C., modern interpretation of Asian cuisine located at the Newseum. It closed in 2020.
- Wolfgang Puck Steak, a signature restaurant of MGM Grand Detroit in Detroit. It closed in 2020.
- Wolfgang Puck Kitchen in Costa Mesa, California
- The Wolfgang Puck Grand Cafe in Evanston, IL opened in February 2001 and closed in September 2007.

== Bibliography ==
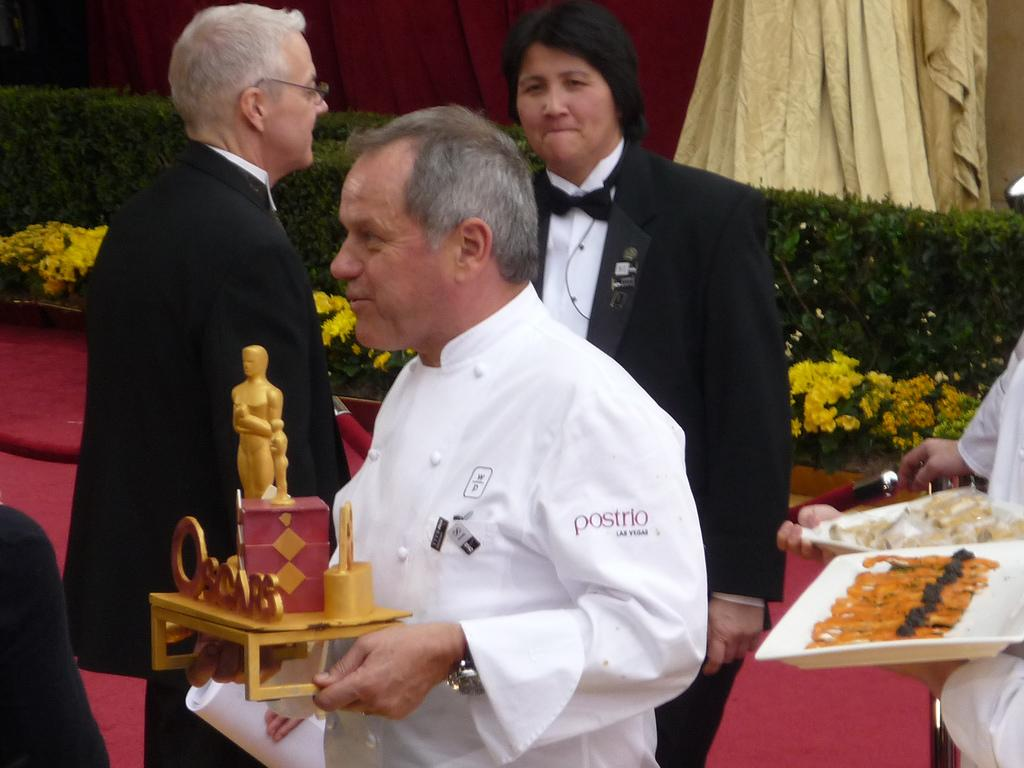
Wolfgang Puck at the February 2009 Academy Awards

- Modern French Cooking for the American Kitchen ISBN 978-0395313282 (1980)
- The Wolfgang Puck Cookbook (1986)
- Adventures in the Kitchen with Wolfgang Puck (1991)
- Pizza, Pasta, and More ISBN 978-0517223727 (2000)
- Live, Love, Eat ISBN 978-0375508912 (2002)
- Wolfgang Puck Makes it Easy ISBN 978-1401601805 (2004)
- Wolfgang Puck Makes it Healthy ISBN 978-1455508853 (2017)

== Television and movie credits ==
Year(s)	Title	Role	Note
1984	Family Feud	Himself	Episodes: "All-Star Family Feud Special", "2nd Battle of the Perfect 10's: Bert's Beauties vs. Betty's Bruisers", "Gordon's Glories vs. Gloria's Go-Getters"
1987	Who's the Boss?	Himself	Episode: "A Fishy Tale"
1992	Tales from the Crypt	Himself	Episode: "Werewolf Concerto"
1999	The Muse	Himself	
2000–02	Frasier	Himself/Tom	Episodes: "The Proposal", "Mary Christmas"
2002	The Simpsons	Guest Star	Episode: "The Bart Wants What It Wants"
2004	Iron Chef America	Himself	
2005	The Weather Man	Himself	
2005	AFI's 100 Years...100 Movie Quotes	Himself	
2006	Las Vegas	Himself	Episodes: "Meatball Montecito", "Father of the Bride", "Lyle & Substance", "The Bitch Is Back", "Pros and Cons"
2006	Celebrity Cooking Showdown	Reality Cast Member	
2008	The Late Late Show with Craig Ferguson	Himself	Episode: December 26, 2008; Kristen Bell, Wolfgang Puck
2009	Top Chef: Las Vegas	Guest Judge	
2009	The Jay Leno Show	Himself	Episode: Jaywalking
2011	Top Chef: New York	Guest Judge	
2011	The Smurfs	Chef Smurf	
2011	Keeping Up with the Kardashians	Himself	Chef to Kim Kardashian & Kris Humphries' Wedding
2011	The Next Food Network Star	Guest Judge	
2011–14	Hell's Kitchen	Guest Judge	
2013	CSI: Crime Scene Investigation	Himself	Episode: "Last Supper"
2016	MasterChef	Guest Judge	
2020	The Chef Show	Himself	
2021	Wolfgang	Himself	Documentary
2021	Beat Bobby Flay	Himself (Guest Judge/Competitor)	Cooking Competition
2025	The Rookie	Himself (caterer)	S7:E17 "Mutiny and the Bounty"

== Companies ==
Wolfgang Puck restaurants, catering services, cookbooks and licensed products are handled by Wolfgang Puck Companies, with three divisions: Wolfgang Puck Fine Dining Group, Wolfgang Puck Catering, and Wolfgang Puck Worldwide, Inc.

== See also ==
- List of American restaurateurs
