= Wyoming State Museum =

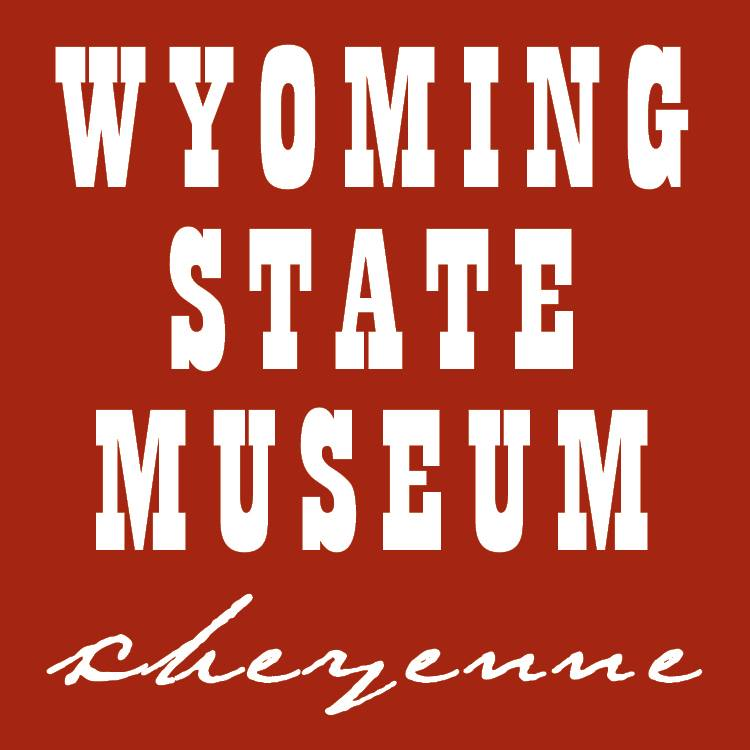

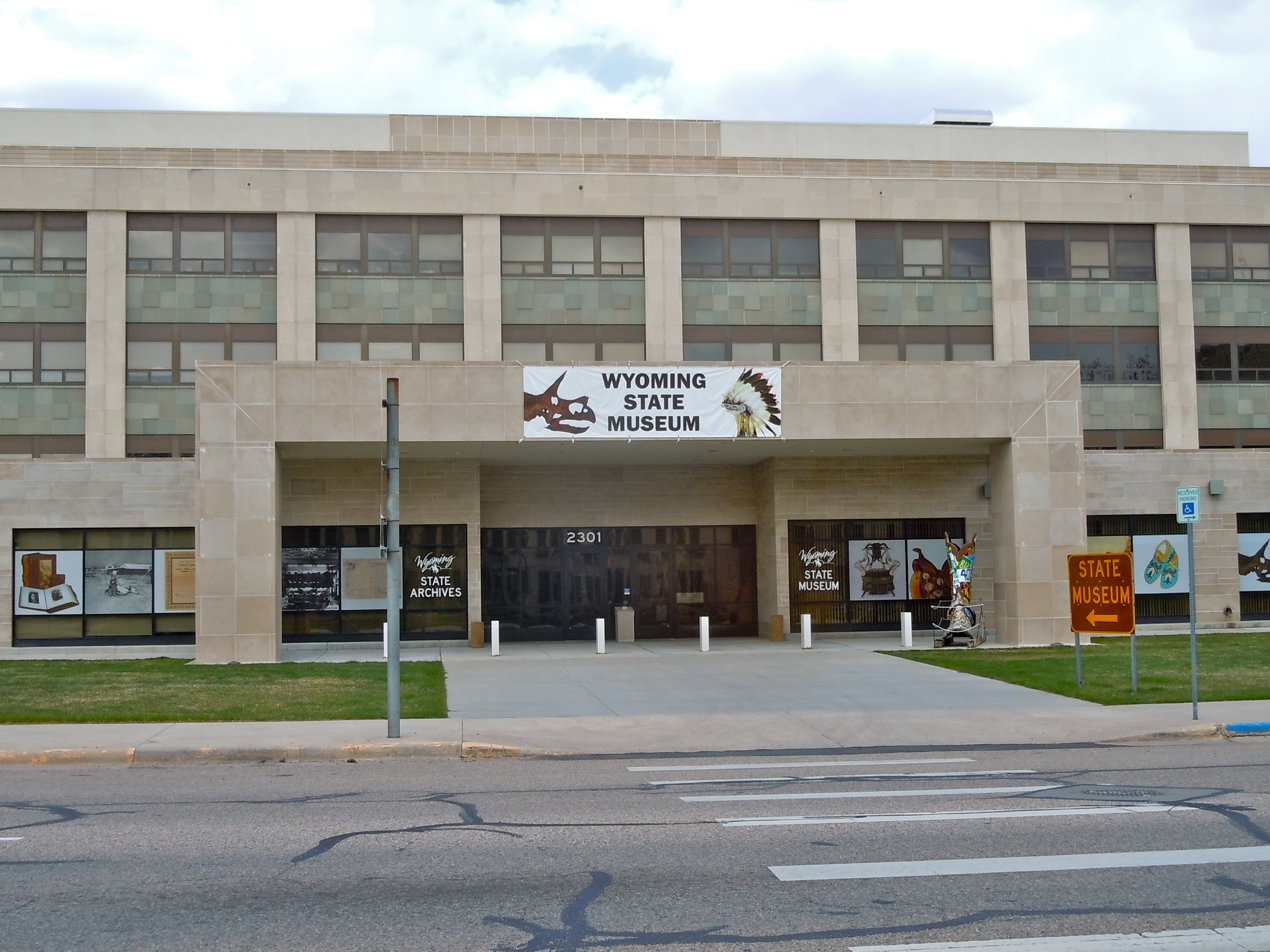

- Location of the museum in Wyoming Wyoming State Museum (the United States)
- Location: 2301 Central Avenue; Cheyenne, Wyoming
- Coordinates: 41.1395°N 104.8177°W
- Type: Museum
- Owner: State of Wyoming
- Website: https://wyomuseum.state.wy.us

The Wyoming State Museum is a state-run museum established in 1895 in Cheyenne, Wyoming. It is the official state repository for material concerning Wyoming history and cultural heritage.

Permanent exhibit themes include coal, flora and fauna, fossils, Wyoming settlement, Native American culture and history, the National Park Service in Wyoming, and other Wyoming-related issues. The museum also hosts a variety of temporary exhibits and provides traveling exhibits to cultural institutions in Wyoming and surrounding states.
