= Bob Zoell =

American painter

- Born: April 13, 1940 (age 86); Regina, Saskatchewan, Canada
- Occupation: Painter
- Years active: 1970–present

Bob Zoell (born April 13, 1940) is an American fine artist, predominantly active in Los Angeles. As a painter, he is best known for his association to the Abstract Reductive Formalism movement. As an illustrator, he was a regular contributor to The New Yorker magazine with seven published covers, as well as to Esquire and the Los Angeles Times. In 1987 his painting Zarathustra’s Cave II was selected for LACMA’s permanent collection).

== Early life ==
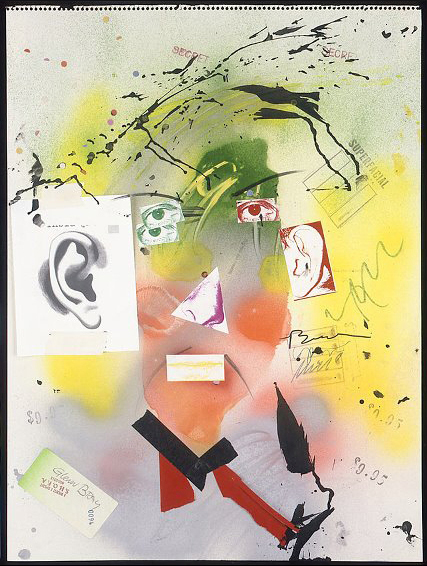
An art-collage portrait of Glenn Bray done by Gary Panter, Bob Zoell, Mick Haggerty and Lou Beach in 1985.

Bob Zoell was born in Regina, Saskatchewan. At age 15, he began working for sign shops and publishing companies. In 1962, he emigrated to Los Angeles, with a design position at Richter & Mracky Design Associates. In 1966, he joined Saul Bass & Associates as an Art Director in charge of Corporate Identity and Packaging. In 1968, he opened his own design and illustration studio in Los Angeles, becoming internationally known for his pioneering work as an editorial illustrator for Esquire, Playboy, the Los Angeles Times, and others.

== Fine art ==
Aesthetic Philosophy

"I was overwhelmed by Nietzsche. I read it all, his Zarathustra several times. Duchamp—his wonderful wit, art because he said it was art. No-mind Zen, how can a reductivist not love No-mind: the dance with Nothing, so close to Something, that space of Be and Is and little words like that? And Wittgenstein's pictures and words: we think in pictures and words. And then Malevich's black square, 50 years ahead of his time. The copulation of Van Gogh's heart, Duchamp's wit and Pollock's guts."

— Bob Zoell, Bob Zoell Selected Work Since 1970

Zoell's art is formally disciplined, yet slyly self-mocking.

In 1970, he began exploring Abstract Reductive Formalism and representational painting, however he first gained attention for his counterfeit parking signs with oddly cryptic messages installed on Los Angeles streets. Critical acclaim soon followed for his minimalist abstractions that combined elemental geometric forms with evocations of "smiley" faces, stick figures, and other rudimentary imagery.

In the 1980s, Zoell started exhibiting at the Los Angeles Institute of Contemporary Art, California State University Northridge, and the University of Southern California. In 1983, he was a featured artist in Domus magazine (Milan, Italy). In 1986, he exhibited murals on the new building of Los Angeles Contemporary Exhibitions (LACE), and a two-person show with Gary Panter at San Jose Institute of Contemporary Art. In 1987 he had a solo show titled Spots at Ace Gallery where he installed works in seven rooms. In 1989, his painting Zarathustra’s Cave II was purchased by the Los Angeles County Museum of Art (LACMA) for its permanent collection.

Zoell's illustration work was featured on seven The New Yorker covers between the mid-1990s and the early 2000s.

From 2000 to 2001, Zoell taught as visiting faculty in advanced painting at UCLA.

In 2011, Flag Stop Art Fair had a major survey of Zoell's work called Pictures and Words, curated by Howard Fox of LACMA. It featured nearly 50 large-scale paintings, prints, signs, and photo-documentation of Zoell's public art projects.

His work has been shown internationally in Japan and France.

"For the past thirty years, the L.A.-based painter, whose work constantly pushes at the boundaries of this medium, has sought to get beyond the comforts of what has been done before so that something unforeseen might take shape—with greater clarity and precision than previously imagined, much less conceived."
—Introduction to Bob Zoell Selected Work Since 1970 (2000) by Los Angeles Times art critic David Pagel

== Public art ==
In 2003, Zoell was a contributor for the Los Angeles County Metropolitan Transportation Authority’s poster project, and in 2004 he installed ceramic tile art on four columns at the Wilshire/Vermont station. In 2010, he installed “bFiLrYd” (Bird Fly), a glass curtain wall on permanent display in the San Francisco International Airport. He also installed a 14’x100’ mural at the Denver Police Facility Firing Range. In 2012, he installed a 155’ ceramic mural at the Nashville Music City Center. In 2020, he installed a mural at PS 464 Elementary School in Manhattan, commissioned by the New York City Department of Cultural Affairs.

== Selected exhibitions ==
- 1975: Pictures, at the home of Bob Zoell, Sherman Oaks, California
- 1982: Western Exterminators, group show, Zero One Gallery, Los Angeles
- 1983: Killer Dips: Bob Zoell & Gary Panter, California State University, San Bernardino, San Bernardino, California
- 1986: Wall Paintings, Los Angeles Contemporary Exhibitions (LACE)
- 1986: Gary Panter / Bob Zoell, two-person show, San Jose Institute of Contemporary Art, San Jose, California
- 1987: Bob Zoell: New Paintings, Maloney Gallery, Santa Monica, California
- 1987: Spots, Ace Gallery, Los Angeles
- 1990: Physical Abstraction, group show, Ace Gallery, Los Angeles
- 2011: Bob Zoell: Pictures and Words, Flag Stop Art Fair, Torrance, California
- 2013: Bob Zoell / Wyatt Kahn, Rachel Uffner Gallery, New York City

== Awards ==
- 1993: Adolph and Esther Gottlieb Foundation grant
- 1994: Pollock-Krasner Foundation grant
