= Frederic Hutchinson Porter =

American architect

Frederic Hutchinson "Bunk" Porter, Sr. (July 9, 1890 – July 6, 1976), sometimes referred to as Frederick Hutchinson Porter, was an American architect based in Cheyenne, Wyoming. He was active from 1911 to approximately 1965. He designed many of Cheyenne's most important public and commercial buildings and also designed several buildings at the University of Wyoming, including War Memorial Stadium and the Agriculture Building. A number of his works are listed on the U.S. National Register of Historic Places.

== Biography ==
Porter was born in Salem, Massachusetts, in 1890. He attended the Wentworth Institute in Boston and also studied at the Architectural Club Ateliers in St. Louis and Boston. He served as an apprentice in an architect's office in Denver starting in 1905. He was married in December 1913 to Grace Geneva Wastfield in a ceremony held in Denver. As of May 1917, he was living in Salt Lake City, Utah, where he was employed as an architectural draftsman by J. N. Jamieson of St. Louis.

Porter began his own architectural practice in Cheyenne, Wyoming, where he designed many of Cheyenne's most important public and commercial buildings. A number of his works are listed on the National Register of Historic Places. He worked in partnership with other architects as Baerreson & Porter (1919-1921), by himself (1921-1944), and as Porter & Bradley (commencing in 1944). He was one of four Wyoming architects to receive state licensing as an architect by "grandfathering" in 1951, the year when state licensing exam was first required and an exam was first offered; he was one of three appointees to the new Wyoming State Board of Architects itself. He also served as an instructor of architectural engineering at the University of Wyoming. He became a Fellow of the American Institute of Architects (FAIA) in 1961. Porter lived in Cheyenne until his death in July 1976 at age 85.

Porter's son, Frederic Hutchinson Porter, Jr., was also an architect. He worked for his father's firm, Porter & Bradley, starting in 1950.

Porter's papers are kept at the American Heritage Center at the University of Wyoming.

== Works ==
=== Works in Cheyenne ===
- Boeing/United Airlines Terminal Building, Hangar and Fountain (1929–1934), also known as Old Airport Terminal Building and Building No. 14, 200 E. 8th Ave., Cheyenne, Wyoming, NRHP-listed (Cheyenne architect "Frederic Porter, Sr." is credited with the design of the large hangar building (1930) north of the terminal building.)
- Boyd Building, southwest corner of Eighteenth Street and Carey Avenue, Cheyenne, Wyoming, part of the Downtown Cheyenne Historic District, NRHP-listed
- Deming School, 715 W. Fifth Ave., Cheyenne, Wyoming, NRHP-listed
- Dinneen Building (1927–1928), 400 West 16th Street, Cheyenne, Wyoming, part of the Downtown Cheyenne Historic District
- Mabel Fincher School, also known as Triumph High School, 2201 Morrie Ave., Cheyenne, Wyoming, NRHP-listed
- First Presbyterian Church (1923–1924), 220 West 22nd Street, Cheyenne, Wyoming (Porter called it the "best job" he ever did)
- Hebard Elementary School, also known as Hebard Public School, 413 Seymour Avenue, Cheyenne, Wyoming
- Lulu McCormick Junior High School, also known as Emerson State Office Building, 2001 Capitol Ave., Cheyenne, Wyoming, NRHP-listed (with William Dubois)
- One or more works in Moore Haven Heights Historic District, between Bent Ave. on the W., E. side of Central Ave. on the E., W. 8th Ave. on the N., W. Pershing Blvd on the S., Cheyenne, Wyoming, NRHP-listed
- Joseph C. O'Mahoney Federal Center (1965), Cheyenne, Wyoming, NRHP-listed
- Park Addition School (1921), also known as Chaplin School, 1100 Richardson Court, Cheyenne, Wyoming, NRHP-listed
- Storey Gymnasium, aka Cheyenne High School Gymnasium, 2811 House Avenue, Cheyenne, Wyoming (Porter and Bradley)

=== Works in Laramie ===
- Bureau of Mines Office (1945), Laramie, Wyoming
- University of Wyoming, Laramie, Wyoming, all new buildings from 1944 to 1956, including the War Memorial Stadium (1949-1959), Field House (1951), Library Building (1950-1951), Agriculture Building (1949), and College of Education Building (1948), all attributed to Porter's partnership with R. W. Bradley, "Porter & Bradley"

=== Works elsewhere ===
- George Amos Memorial Library (1941), Gillette, Wyoming
- Carbon County Courthouse (1939-1940), 415 West Pine Street, Rawlins, Wyoming, part of the Downtown Rawlins Historic District
