= Lulu McCormick Junior High School =

- U.S. National Register of Historic Places
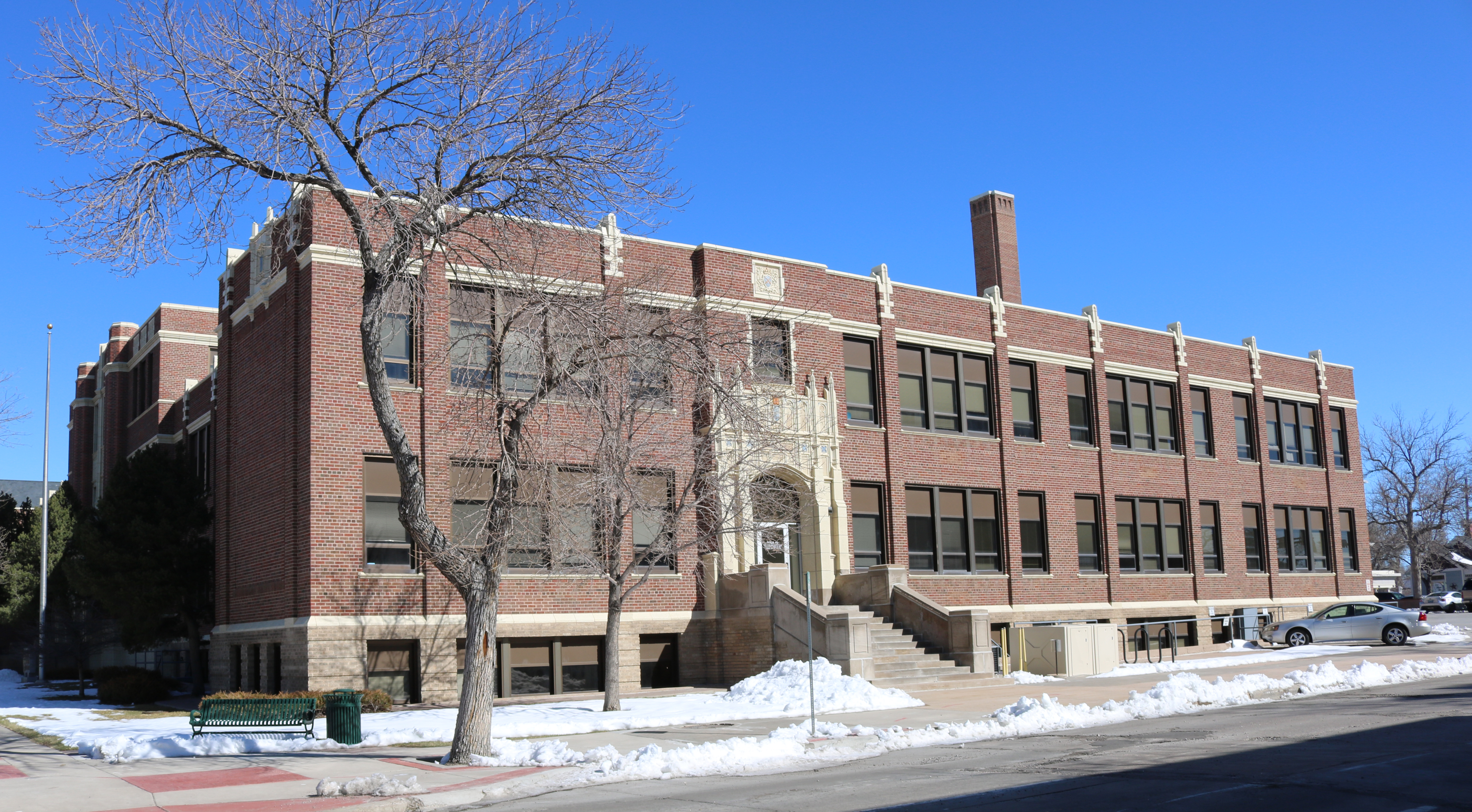
- A view of the West 20th Street elevation.

- Location within Wyoming Location within the United States
- Location: 2001 Capitol Ave., Cheyenne, Wyoming
- Coordinates: 41°08′13″N 104°49′03″W
- Area: 2.4 acres (0.97 ha)
- Built: 1929
- Architect: Dubois, William; Porter, Frederick Hutchinson
- Architectural style: Late Gothic Revival
- MPS: Public Schools in Cheyenne, Wyoming MPS
- NRHP reference No.: 05000699
- Added to NRHP: August 22, 2005

The Lulu McCormick Junior High School at 2001 Capitol Ave. in Cheyenne, Wyoming was built in 1929. It was a work of Frederick Hutchinson Porter. It has also been known as Emerson Building. It was listed on the National Register of Historic Places in 2005.
