= Moore Haven Heights Historic District =

- U.S. National Register of Historic Places
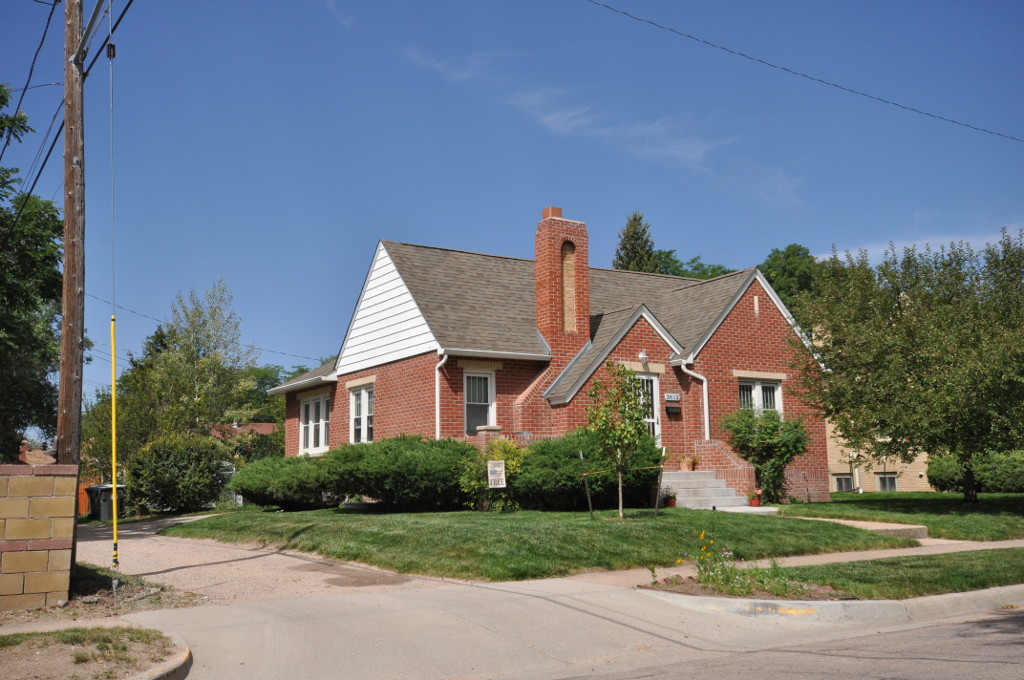

- Location within Wyoming
- Location: Between Bent Ave. on the W., E. side of Central Ave. on the E., W. 8th Ave. on the N., W. Pershing Blvd on the S., Cheyenne, Wyoming
- Coordinates: 41°08′58″N 104°49′31″W
- Area: 100 acres (40 ha)
- Built: 1926
- Architect: Frederick Hutchinson Porter, William H. Dubois
- Architectural style: Late 19th and Early 20th Century American Movements, Late 19th and 20th Century Revivals
- NRHP reference No.: 08001305
- Added to NRHP: January 8, 2009

The Moore Haven Heights Historic District, in Cheyenne, Wyoming, is a 100 acres (40 ha) historic district which was listed on the National Register of Historic Places in 2009. The listing included 445 contributing buildings.

The district runs between Bent Ave. on the west, the eastern side of Central Ave. on the east, W. 8th Ave. on the north, and W. Pershing Boulevard on the south.

According to the state of Wyoming, the district was determined "eligible as a distinct and cohesive residential area integrally associated with and representative of the significant trends that contributed to the development of the City of Cheyenne from the early twentieth century through the late 1950s. As conceived and carried out, Moore Haven Heights represented an upscale residential district constructed with well-built brick homes of a certain value with similar architectural styles to present a homogeneous appearance. Strict covenants assured that substantial brick homes were built and lots were restricted to single-family dwellings with a garage. As a result, Moore Haven Heights became an established upper-middle class neighborhood. / The district is also nominated due to the remarkable physical integrity of the residences, which reflect the changes in popular architecture in America. From the Tudor brick in the 1920s and 1930s to the one-story Ranch homes built during the 1940s and 1950s. Thus, the predominant Tudor style homes of the 1920s and 1930s gave way to the new architecture, especially after World War II. Today, a drive through the neighborhood from south to north clearly reveals the difference in architecture, lot size, and landscaping."

It includes works by architects and builders including Frederick Hutchinson Porter and William DuBois.
