= Mabel Fincher School =

- U.S. National Register of Historic Places
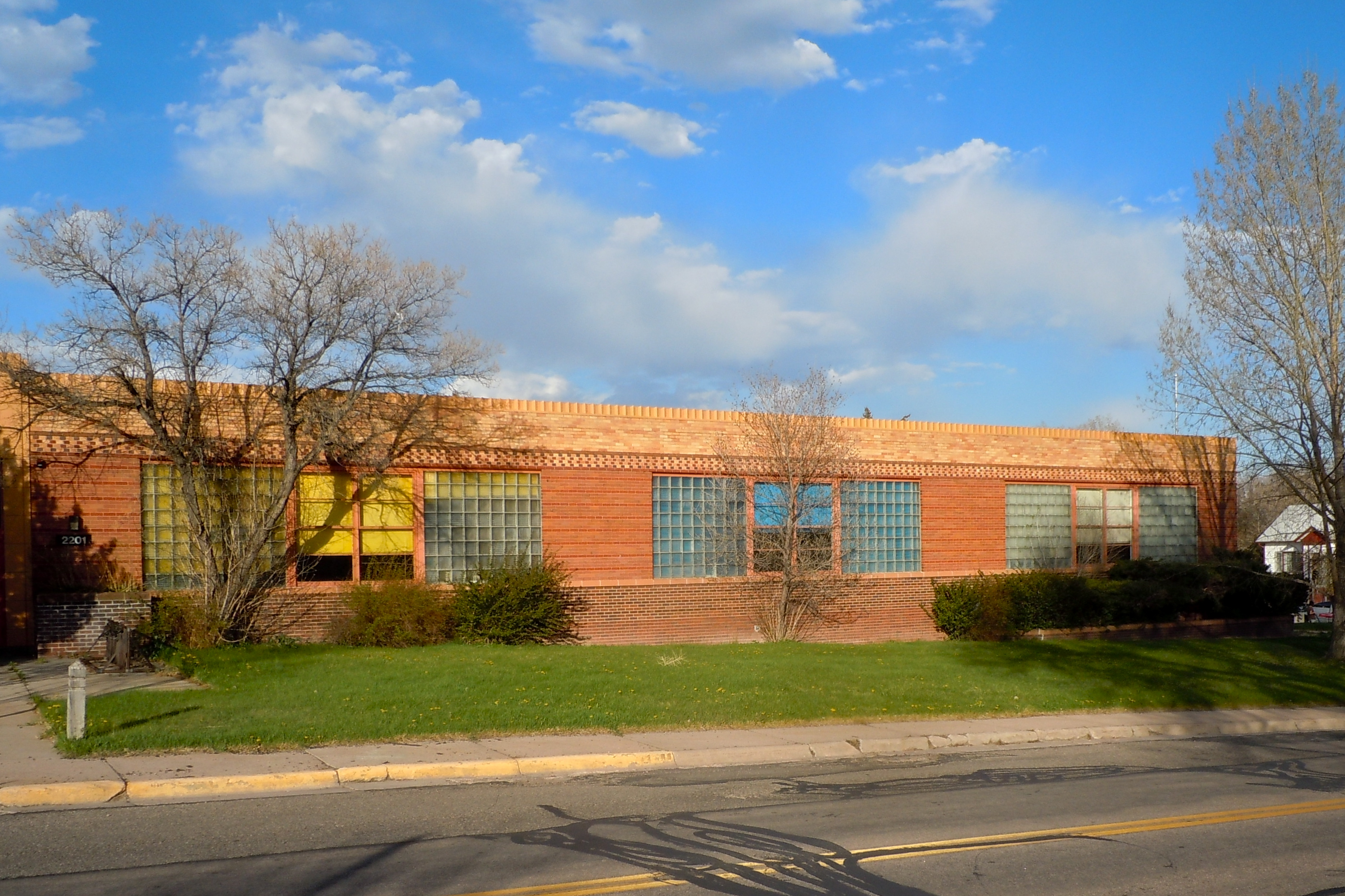
- Location: 2201 Morrie Ave., Cheyenne, Wyoming
- Coordinates: 41°08′34″N 104°48′25″W
- Area: 2.3 acres (0.93 ha)
- Built: 1940
- Built by: Jacob Weber
- Architect: Frederick Hutchinson Porter
- Architectural style: Art Deco
- MPS: Public Schools in Cheyenne, Wyoming MPS
- NRHP reference No.: 05000700
- Added to NRHP: August 22, 2005

The Mabel Fincher School, at 2201 Morrie Ave. in Cheyenne, Wyoming, is an Art Deco-style building which was built in 1940. It has also served as the Triumph High School. It was listed on the National Register of Historic Places in 2005.

It is a one-story L-shaped building. It was designed by Frederick Hutchinson Porter.
