= Deming Elementary School =

School in Cheyenne, Wyoming, U.S.

- Deming School
- U.S. National Register of Historic Places
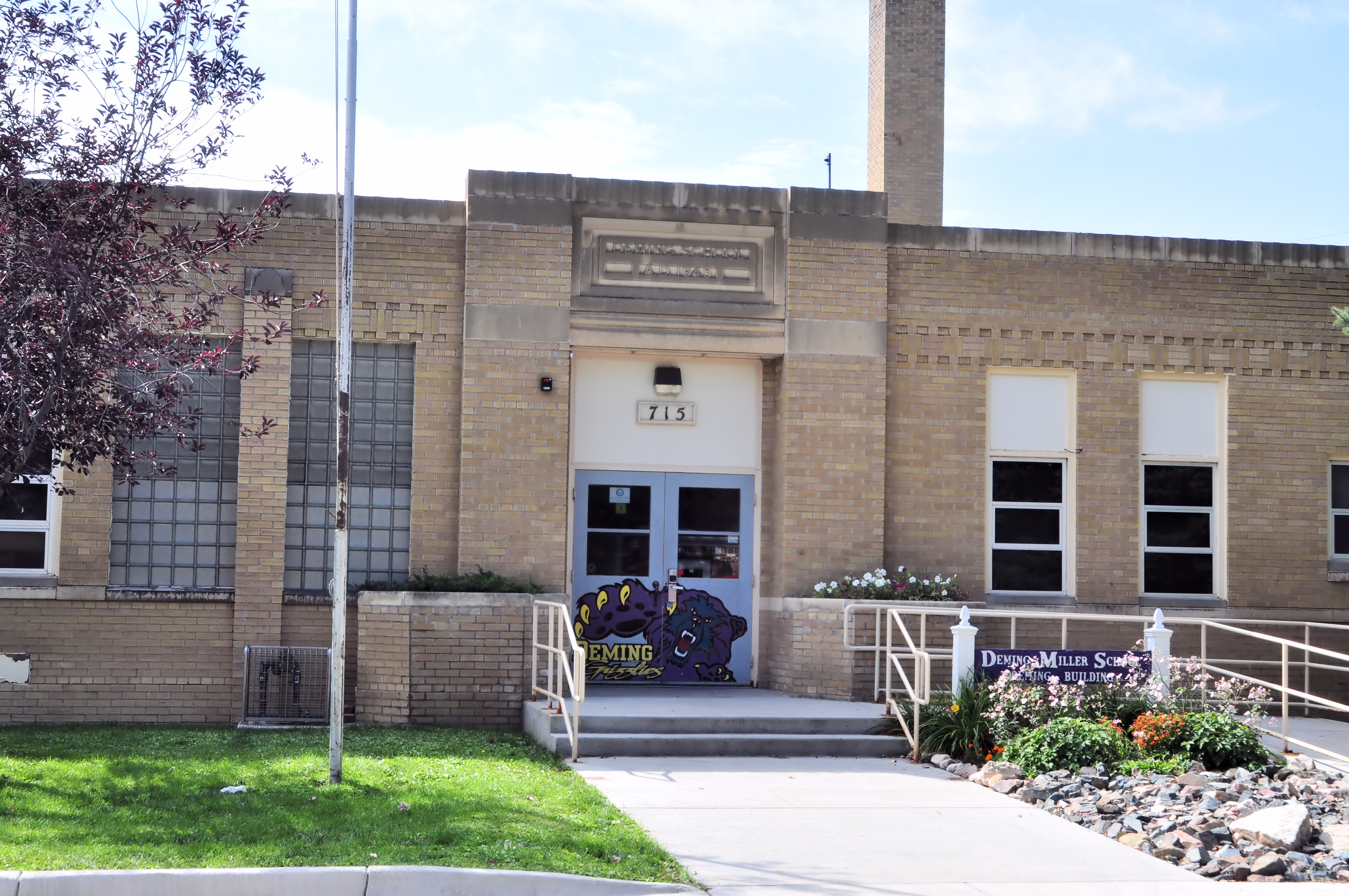

- Location within Wyoming Location within the United States
- Location: 715 W. Fifth Ave., Cheyenne, Wyoming
- Coordinates: 41°9′1″N 104°49′46″W
- Area: 1 acre (0.40 ha)
- Built: 1945
- Built by: Jacob Weber
- Architect: Porter, Frederick Hutchinson
- Architectural style: Art Deco, International Style
- MPS: Public Schools in Cheyenne, Wyoming MPS
- NRHP reference No.: 05000701
- Added to NRHP: August 22, 2005

Deming Elementary School is an elementary school in Cheyenne, Wyoming. It is part of the Laramie County School District Number 1. The school was designed by Frederick Hutchinson Porter and built in 1945. It was listed on the National Register of Historic Places in 2005.

According to its NRHP nomination, it was deemed significant for "its direct association with the growth of education in Cheyenne" and "as an example of Art Deco architecture with elements of the International Style in an educational building and as the work of a master architect, Frederick Hutchinson Porter." The building "is a substantial brick masonry structure built with community pride and permanency in mind, and which incorporates the standard designs advocated by early twentieth century educational reformers."
