= Phil Ligrani =

- Born: Phillip Meredith Ligrani; Cheyenne, Wyoming

Academic background
- Education: University of Texas at Austin (BSc); Stanford University (MSc, PhD)

Academic work
- Discipline: Mechanical engineering
- Website: Ligrani.com

Phillip Meredith Ligrani is a Professor of Mechanical and Aerospace Engineering at the University of Alabama in Huntsville. He is also the Eminent Scholar in Propulsion within the Propulsion Research Center.

== Career ==
Ligrani was born in Cheyenne, Wyoming. After receiving his Bachelor of Science degree in mechanical engineering from the University of Texas at Austin, he pursued his graduate studies at Stanford University where he received his master's degree and his PhD. His doctoral dissertation was entitled The thermal and hydrodynamic behaviour of thick, roughwall, turbulent boundary layers. In 1992, he joined the faculty of the Department of Mechanical Engineering at University of Utah and became a full professor there several years later.

From 2006 through 2009 Ligrani was the Donald Schultz Professor of Turbomachinery in the Department of Engineering Science at the University of Oxford. During that time he also served as the director of Oxford's Rolls-Royce UTC (University Technology Centre) in Heat Transfer and Aerodynamics and as professorial fellow at St Catherine's College, Oxford. He returned to the US in 2010, when he was appointed to the Oliver L. Parks Endowed Chair at Saint Louis University's Parks College of Engineering, Aviation and Technology.

In September 2014 Ligrani was appointed Eminent Scholar in Propulsion and Professor of Mechanical and Aerospace Engineering at the University of Alabama in Huntsville.

== Research ==
Ligrani has published extensively in the fields of convective heat transfer, propulsion, and fluid dynamics. His research has focused on turbomachinery, convective heat transfer, transonic, supersonic, and hypersonic flows, fluid mechanics, microfluidics, fractionation and separation science. As of 2026, he has authored or co-authored more than 241 publications in scientific journals, 178 conference publications, and twelve book chapters and holds three patents. He has also served as a consultant to various government agencies and aerospace companies on a range of projects related to aerospace propulsion and energy conversion. His current Google Scholar H-INDEX is 61 and his current SCOPUS H-INDEX is 54. Academic awards include the ASME Henry R. Worthington Medal in 2024, the AIAA Hermann Oberth Award in 2020, and the University of Alabama in Huntsville Distinguished Research Award for Excellence in 2019.
