= Mark T. Cox IV =

American financier and government official (born 1942)

Mark T. Cox IV (born July 14, 1942) is an American financier and former government official who served as the Alternate United States Executive Director of the International Bank for Reconstruction and Development.

== Biography ==
Cox was born in Cheyenne, Wyoming on July 14, 1942, to Elizabeth and Mark Cox III, prominent local ranchers and racehorse breeders who were close associates of President Ronald Reagan. He graduated from Columbia University in 1966 and served in the United States Army Reserve from 1967 to 1969 before receiving an M.B.A. from Columbia Business School in 1971.

Cox joined First Chicago Bank in 1972, serving as assistant vice president and general manager of the bank's branch in Port-au-Prince. From 1977 to 1978, he was vice president and treasurer of First Chicago Investments Canada. From 1983 to 1985, he was the bank's vice president and representative in São Paulo, and from 1983 to 1985, the vice president and regional manager for Florida. From 1985 to 1987, he served as the bank's vice president and head of Western Hemisphere Capital Market Group Mexico in Golden Beach, Florida.

On April 11, 1988, Cox was nominated by President Ronald Reagan to serve as the United States Executive Director of the World Bank for a term of two years. He was made Senior Vice President of International Business Development at Dominion Energy and retired from that post. From 2007 to 2009, Cox serve as chairman of Virginia Opera. He currently lives in Richmond, Virginia and served on the executive committee of Richmond Symphony Orchestra.
