= The Plains Hotel =

Hotel in Wyoming US

- Industry: Hospitality
- Founded: 1911

The Plains Hotel is a hotel and restaurant in Cheyenne, Wyoming.

It is on the National Register of Historic Places. It is part of the Downtown Cheyenne Historic District.
