= Downtown Cheyenne Historic District =

Historic district in Wyoming, United States

- U.S. National Register of Historic Places
- U.S. Historic district
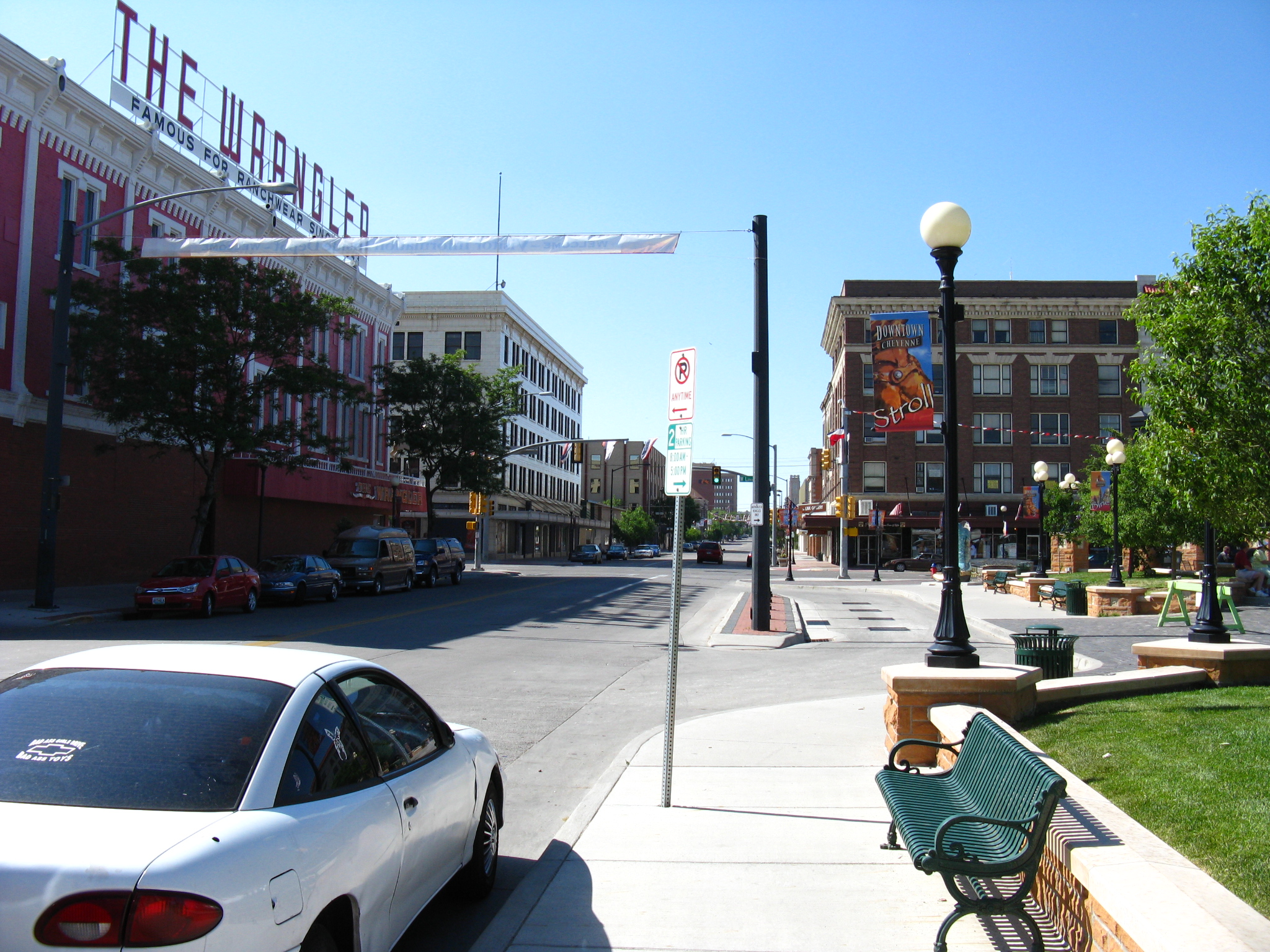
- Downtown Cheyenne, in 2008

- Location within Wyoming Location within the United States
- Location: Roughly bounded by 15th and 16th Sts. and Central and Pioneer Aves. (original); also roughly bounded by 17th and 18th Sts., Pioneer and Carey Aves., also along Central Ave. and 17th St.; also roughly bounded by 19th St., Capital Ave., 17th St., and Carey Ave.; also roughly bounded by 18th, Carey, 16th, and Warren Sts., Cheyenne, Wyoming
- Coordinates: 41.13194°N 104.81556°W
- Area: 10.1 acres (4.1 ha)
- Built: 1867
- Architect: William Dubois
- Architectural style: Beaux Arts, Early Commercial
- NRHP reference No.: 78003434; 80004049; 88000522; 96000909
- Added to NRHP: December 22, 1978; December 22, 1980; May 20, 1988; August 22, 1996

The Downtown Cheyenne Historic District in Cheyenne, Wyoming is a historic district that was listed on the National Register of Historic Places in 1978. It is an area of about seven blocks, in the core of the original business district of Cheyenne, and home of many of the first masonry commercial buildings in Cheyenne.

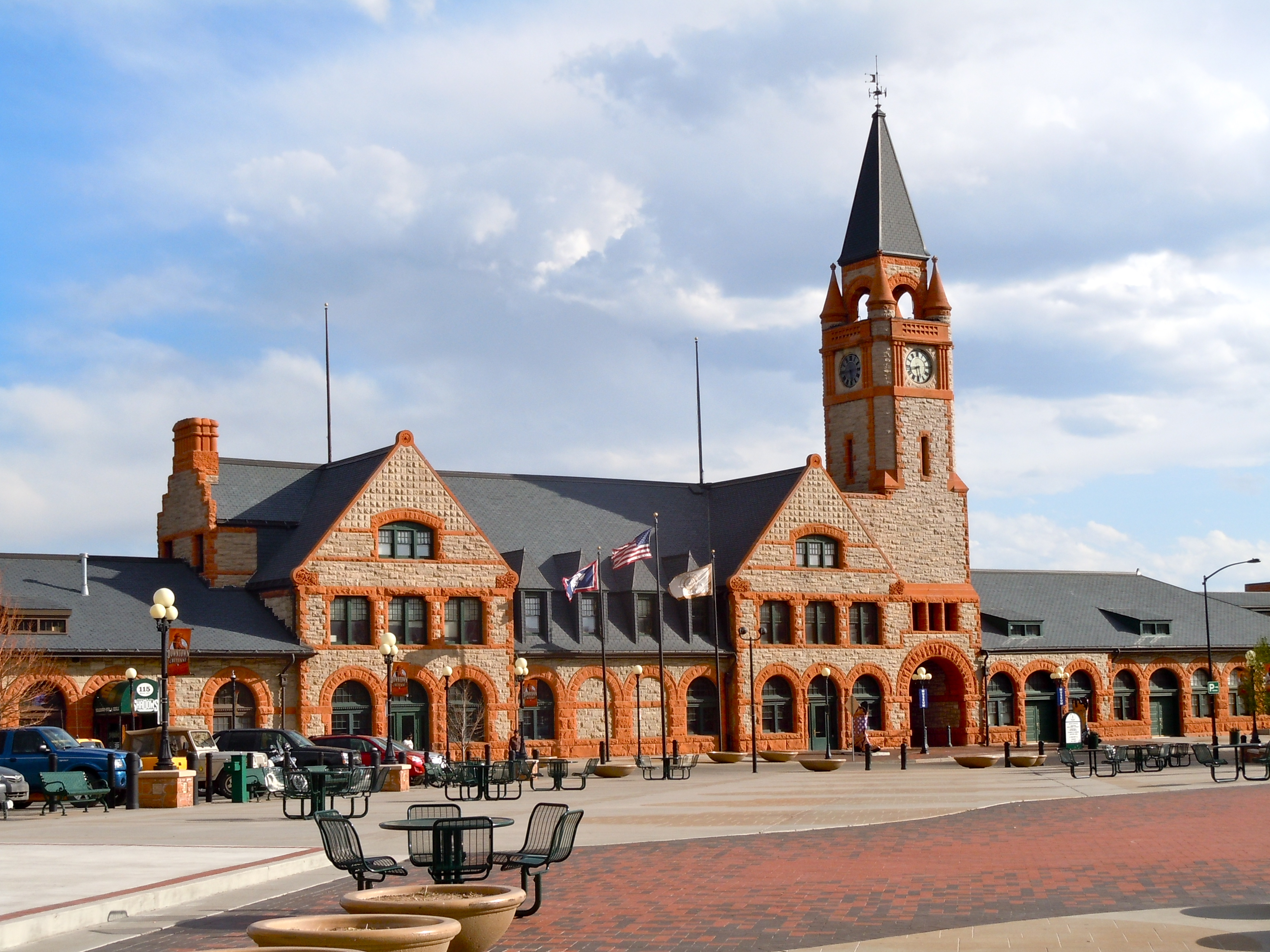
Union Pacific Depot, in 2011

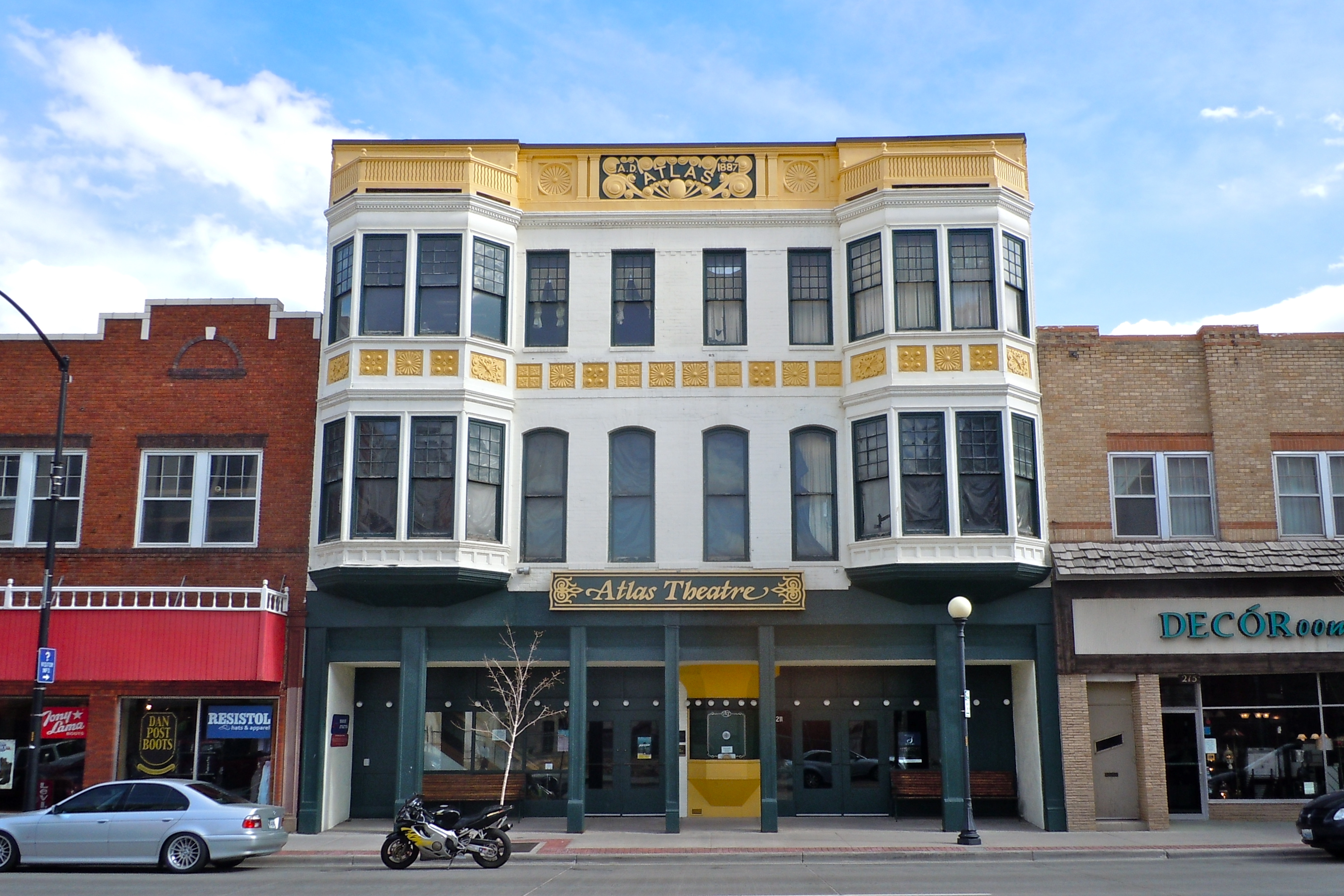
Atlas Theatre, in 2011

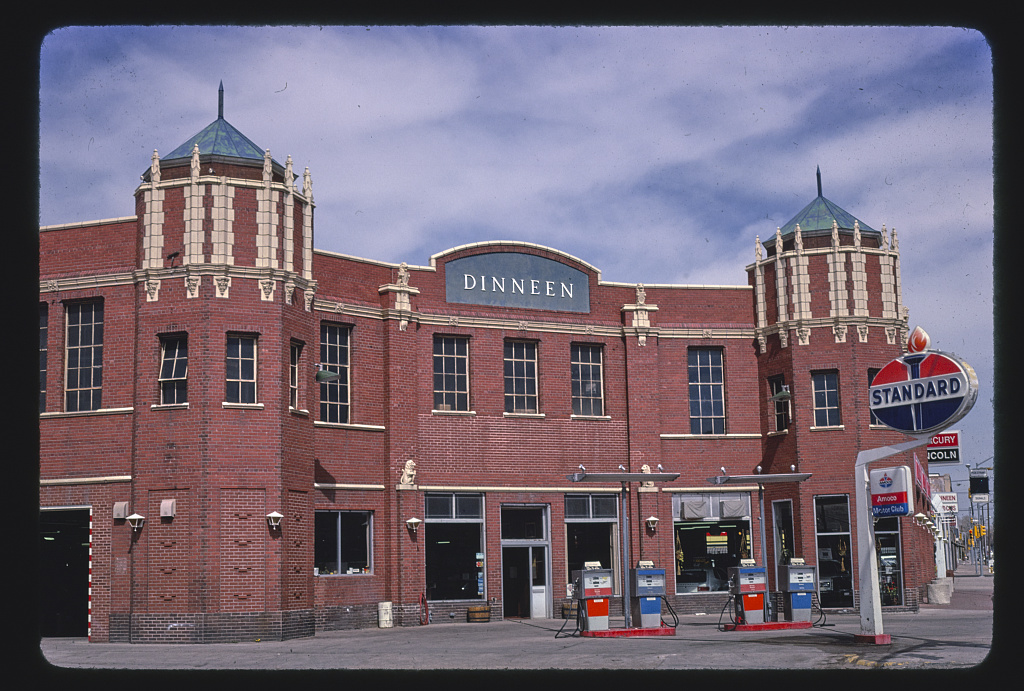
Dinneen Building, 1980

Its boundaries have been increased three times. The revised district, in 1996, included 96 buildings, 67 of which were deemed to contribute to the historic character of the area, and several of which were previously individually listed on the National Register.

Key buildings include:

- Richardsonian Romanesque red and gray sandstone Union Pacific Railroad Depot (designated a National Historic Landmark in 2006),
- the two-story brick Dinneen Building with two towers framing a diagonal facade, and
- Romanesque Revival style Masonic Temple.

== Original ==
The original 1978 listing included 22 buildings, including two buildings that had already been listed on the National Register previously. These 22 buildings include:

- The Plains Hotel, northwest corner of 16th (Lincolnway) and Plains
- The Majestic Building, northeast corner of 16th (Lincolnway) and Capitol
- The Capitol Avenue Theater, 1607 Capitol. Constructed in 1904.
- The Hynds Building, 1602-1610 Capitol Avenue.
- The Warren Block, 206-210 West 16th (Lincolnway) Street. Destroyed by arsonist in 2004.
- First National Bank Building, 214 West 16th (Lincolnway) Street. Constructed in 1882.
- Commercial Building, 216-218 West 16th (Lincolnway) Street. Constructed in 1883.
- Idelman Building, 222 West 16th (Lincolnway) Street.
- Dinneen Building, 400 West 16th (Lincolnway) Street.
- Tivoli Building, 301 West 16th (Lincolnway) Street.
- Cheyenne Western Galleries Annex, 1516 Carey Avenue.
- Sorensen Hardware Company Building, 317 West 16th (Lincolnway) Avenue. Demolished in 1990.
- Golden Key Antique Building, 316 West 15th Street.
- 304 and 306 West 15th Street.
- Phoenix Block, 201 West 16th (Lincolnway) Street.
- Atlas Theater, 213 West 16th (Lincolnway) Street. Listed separated on the National Register in 1973.
- Shuman Building, 1517 Carey Avenue.
- 1515 Carey Avenue.
- Rex Hotel, 202 West 15th Street/1501 Carey Avenue.
- Becker Hotel, 212-216 West 15th Street.
- Coors Building, 1502-1506 Capitol Avenue.
- Union Pacific Depot, 1416 Dodge Street. Listed separately in 1973. Declared a National Historic Landmark in 2006.

== 1980 Expansion ==
The 1980 expansion consists of 25 buildings to the north and east of the original district. These include the following:

- 400 West 17th Street
- 1704 1/2 Pioneer Avenue. Demolished.
- Pioneer Hook and Ladder Company, 1712 Pioneer Avenue.
- 319 1/2-321-325 West 18th Street.
- 313-319 West 18th Street.
- 1713-1715 Pioneer Avenue.
- UMW of America Building, 311 West 18th Street.
- Boyd Building, southwest corner, 18th Street and Carey Avenue.
- I.L. Davis Building, northeast corner, 17th Street and Pioneer Avenue.
- 318 West 17th Street.
- 316 West 17th Street.
- Harrington Furniture Company, 314 West 17th Street.
- Waldman Building, 1723-1727 Carey Avenue.
- Christensen's Jewelry Store, 1721 Carey Avenue.
- 1701-1709 Carey Avenue.
- Old Rocky Mountain Bell Telephone Company Building, 119 West 17th Street.
- Royal Optical Building, 117 West 17th Street.
- 107-109 West 17th Street.
- Deming Building, 1620 Central Avenue.
- 1612 Central Avenue.
- Old Montgomery Ward Building, 1621 Central Avenue.
- Telesonic Building, 109 West 17th Street.
- Lincoln Theater, 1615 Central Avenue.
- 1609 Central Avenue.
- Grier Furniture Company Building, northeast corner, 16th (Lincolnway) Street and Central Avenue.

== 1988 Expansion ==
The 1988 expansion encompassed 11 buildings to the north of the 1980 expansion. One of these buildings was previously listed on the National Register on its own. These buildings include:

- 1809-1811 Carey Avenue.
- The Fiske Block, 1813-1825 Carey Avenue.
- The YWCA Building, 211 West 19th Street.
- The Masonic Temple, 1820 Capitol Avenue. Listed separately on the National Register in 1984.
- 1800-1810 Capitol Avenue.
- 206 West 18th Street.
- 217 West 18th Street.
- 211-213 West 18th Street.
- 1726 Capitol Avenue.
- 1716-1718 Capitol Avenue.
- 1714 Capitol Avenue.

== 1996 Expansion ==
A resurvey was done of existing structures in 1995 to consolidate the district boundaries, add six buildings, and remove a couple buildings that were no longer contributing or were demolished. These include the following:

- 408 West 17th Street was added.
- 1726 Capitol Avenue was removed from the 1988 expansion, as it was found to be built in 1949, and had not yet reached the 50 year age for eligibility in the National Register.
- The Pioneer Hotel, 207-213 West 17th Street was added.
- 115 East 17th Street was added.
- Sorensen Hardware, 317 West 16th Street, was removed, as the building was demolished in 1990.
- The Royal Hotel Building at 313-315 1/2 West 16th Street was noted as already contributing.
- 305-309 West 16th Street was noted as already contributing.
- The Bus Depot at 1503 Capitol Avenue was added. This building was the only surviving bus depot in the state of Wyoming when it was added. The building has since been demolished.
