= Capitol North Historic District =

Historic district in Wyoming, United States

- U.S. National Register of Historic Places
- U.S. Historic district
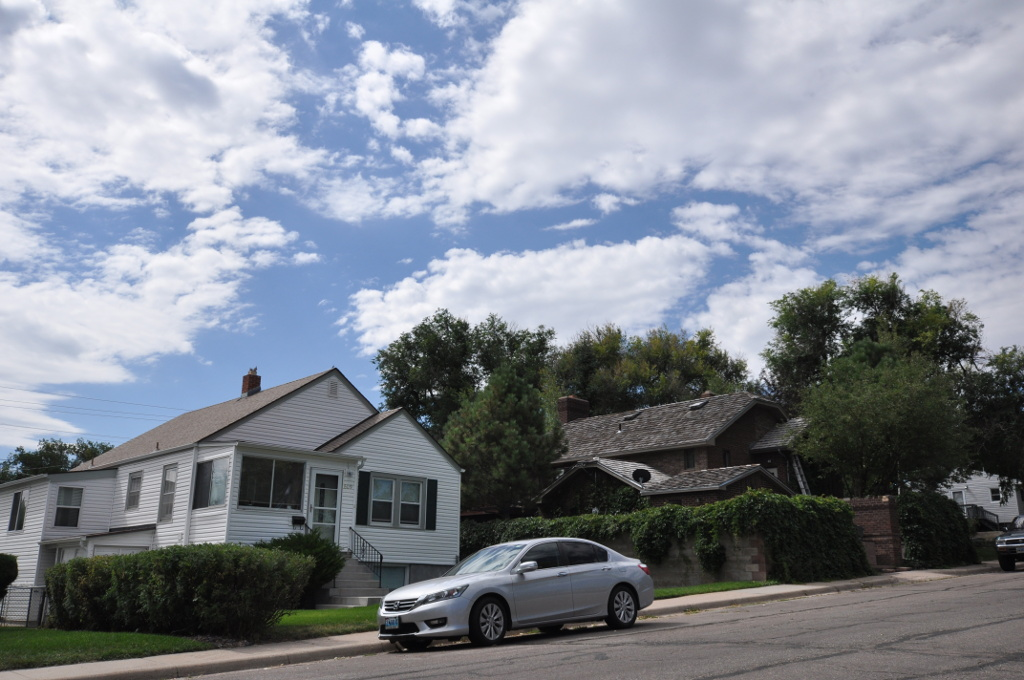

- Location within Wyoming Location within the United States
- Location: Roughly bounded by E. 29th, and E. 25th St., Warren and Pioneer Aves., Cheyenne, Wyoming
- Coordinates: 41°08′32″N 104°48′33″W
- Area: 20.4 acres (8.3 ha)
- Architectural style: Cottage
- NRHP reference No.: 80004048 (original); 100009596 (increase)

Significant dates
- Added to NRHP: December 10, 1980
- Boundary increase: December 7, 2023

The Capitol North Historic District in Cheyenne, Wyoming is a 20.4 acres (8.3 ha) historic district which was listed on the National Register of Historic Places in 1980.

The district is roughly bounded by E. 29th, and E. 25th St., Warren and Pioneer Avenues. It included 112 contributing buildings, a contributing structure, and two contributing objects when first listed.

Located near to the Wyoming State Capitol and other state buildings, it includes mostly frame construction cottages built for the middle to upper class market. It includes numerous houses where governors, judges, and other professionals have lived, including for example the Governor Leslie Miller Home on the 200 block of W. 26th St. Included in the southwest corner of the district is Gilchrist Park.
