= USS Cheyenne =

Six ships of the United States Navy have been named USS Cheyenne, in honor of the city of Cheyenne, Wyoming.

- USS Cheyenne (1898) was a tugboat in use during July and August 1898.
- USS Cheyenne (BM-10) was originally the Arkansas-class monitor Wyoming, renamed in 1909 to make the name Wyoming available for the battleship USS Wyoming (BB-32).
- USS Cheyenne (CL-86) was a Cleveland-class light cruiser, renamed USS Vicksburg a year before she was launched in 1942.
- USS Cheyenne (CL-117) was a planned Fargo-class light cruiser, but construction was canceled on 12 August 1945.
- USNS Cheyenne (T-AG-174) was a Phoenix-class miscellaneous auxiliary, launched 26 June 1945 and struck 15 June 1973.
- USS Cheyenne (SSN-773) is a Los Angeles-class nuclear attack submarine, commissioned in 1996 and in active service.
