= Cheyenne South Side Historic District =

Historic district in Wyoming, United States

- U.S. National Register of Historic Places
- U.S. Historic district
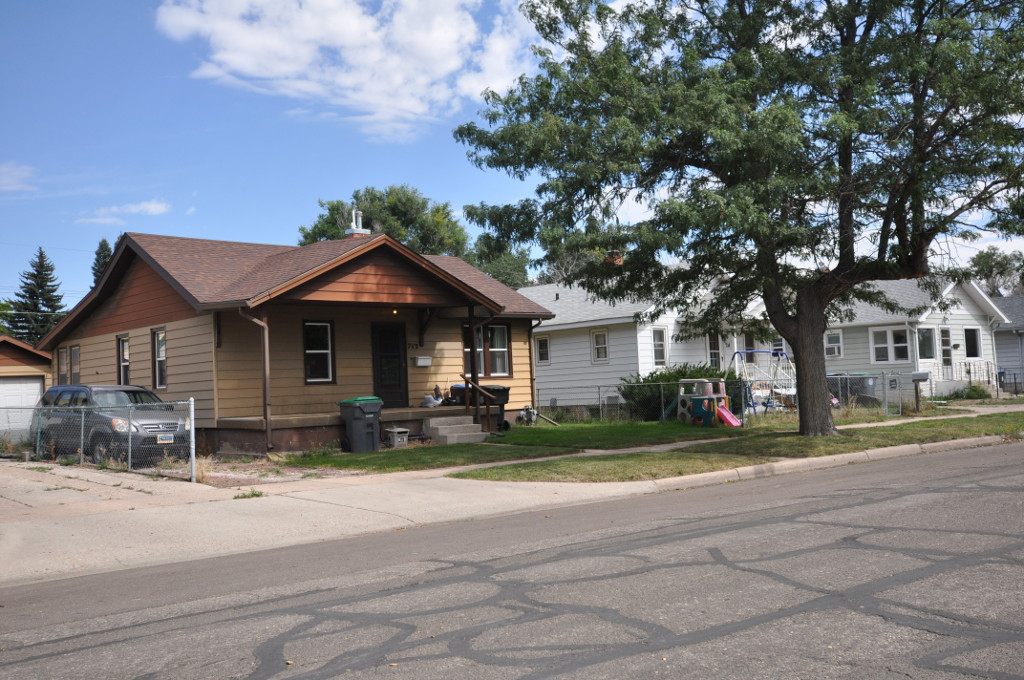

- Location within Wyoming Location within the United States
- Location: Roughly bounded by Warren Ave., Russell Ave., E. Tenth St., and E Fifth St., Cheyenne, Wyoming
- Coordinates: 41.127222°N 104.803611°W
- Area: 107.4 acres (0.435 km^{2})
- Architectural style: Late 19th And Early 20th Century American Movements, Late Victorian
- NRHP reference No.: 06000939
- Added to NRHP: October 11, 2006

Cheyenne South Side Historic District is a 107.4-acre (43.5 ha) historic district which was listed on the National Register of Historic Places in 2006. It is roughly bounded by Warren Avenue, Russell Avenue, E. Tenth Street, and E. Fifth Street. The listing included 393 contributing buildings and 175 non-contributing ones.

It is a residential area next to Union Pacific Railway yards on the south side of Cheyenne, separated by the railroad tracks from Cheyenne's original downtown and residential areas.
