= Storey Gymnasium =

- U.S. National Register of Historic Places
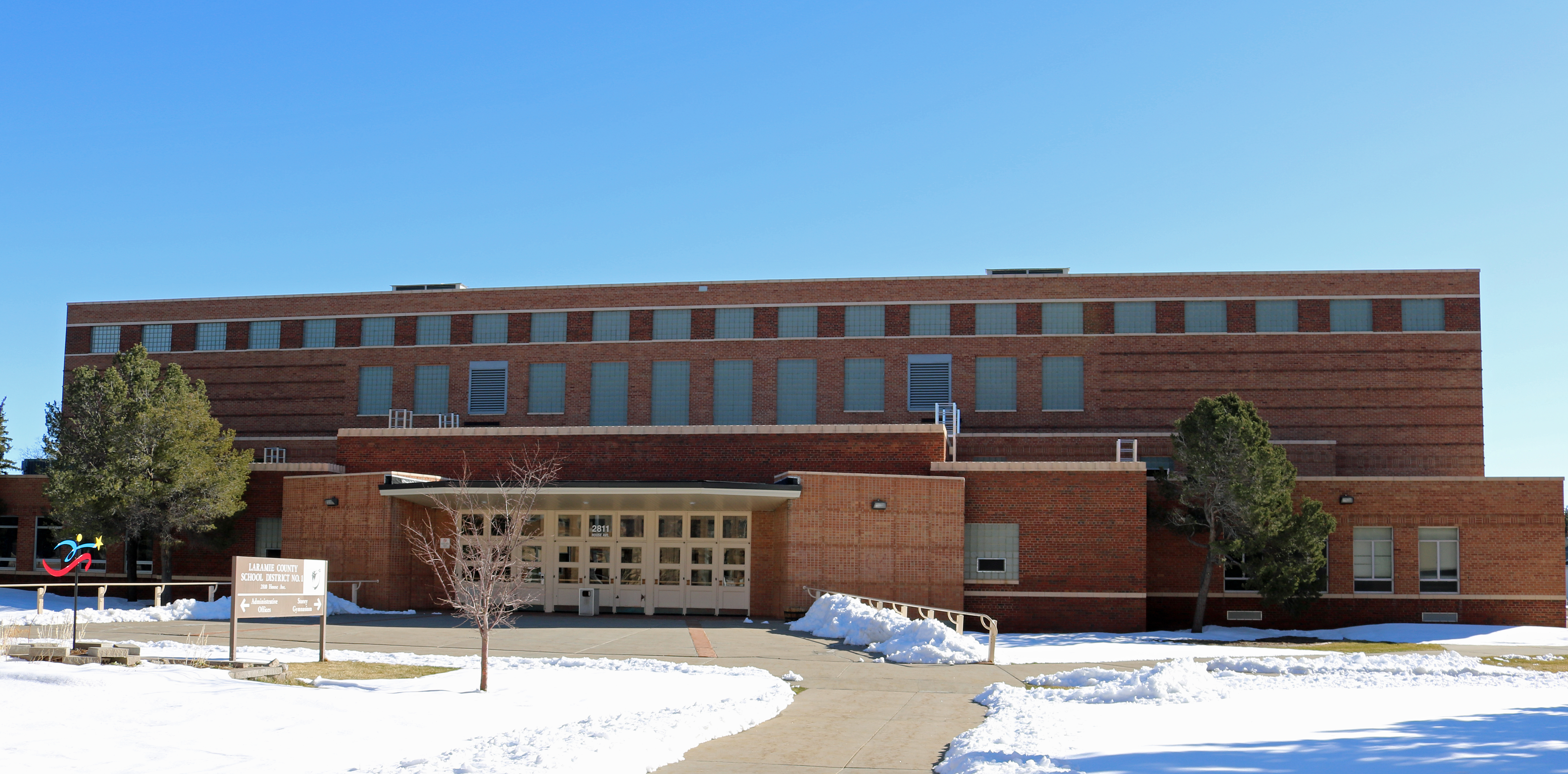
- Storey Gymnasium in 2016

- Location within Wyoming Location within the United States
- Location: 2811 House Ave., Cheyenne, Wyoming
- Coordinates: 41°8′43″N 104°49′5″W
- Area: 2.5 acres (1.0 ha)
- Built: 1950
- Built by: Hancock, Loren
- Architect: Porter and Bradley
- Architectural style: Modern
- MPS: Public Schools in Cheyenne, Wyoming MPS
- NRHP reference No.: 05000707
- Added to NRHP: August 22, 2005

Storey Gymnasium, also known as Cheyenne High School Gymnasium, was built in 1953 on the campus of Central High School in Cheyenne, Wyoming, United States. The brick gymnasium was designed by Cheyenne architect Frederic Hutchinson Porter to include additional functions associated with the school's ROTC program, with an armory, rifle range and drill halls in addition to classrooms, shops and music spaces. The contractor was Loren Hancock, who built it at a cost of $646,611.66. It was named for William Storey, a member of the school Board of Trustees. When East High School was built in 1965 the facility was shared between East and Central.

The two-story brick building measures about 240 feet (73 m) by 180 feet (55 m). It features plain surfaces and uninterrupted horizontal lines without ornamentation beyond horizontal brick features in the upper portion. The center section houses a gymnasium illuminated by glass block windows set in a clerestory. It seated 4,500 for basketball when it first opened and is still in use for sporting events, circuses, graduation ceremonies, and other special events.

Storey Gymnasium was placed on the National Register of Historic Places on August 22, 2005.

In September 2016, the gymnasium seating was replaced with all black seats.
