= Park Addition School =

- U.S. National Register of Historic Places
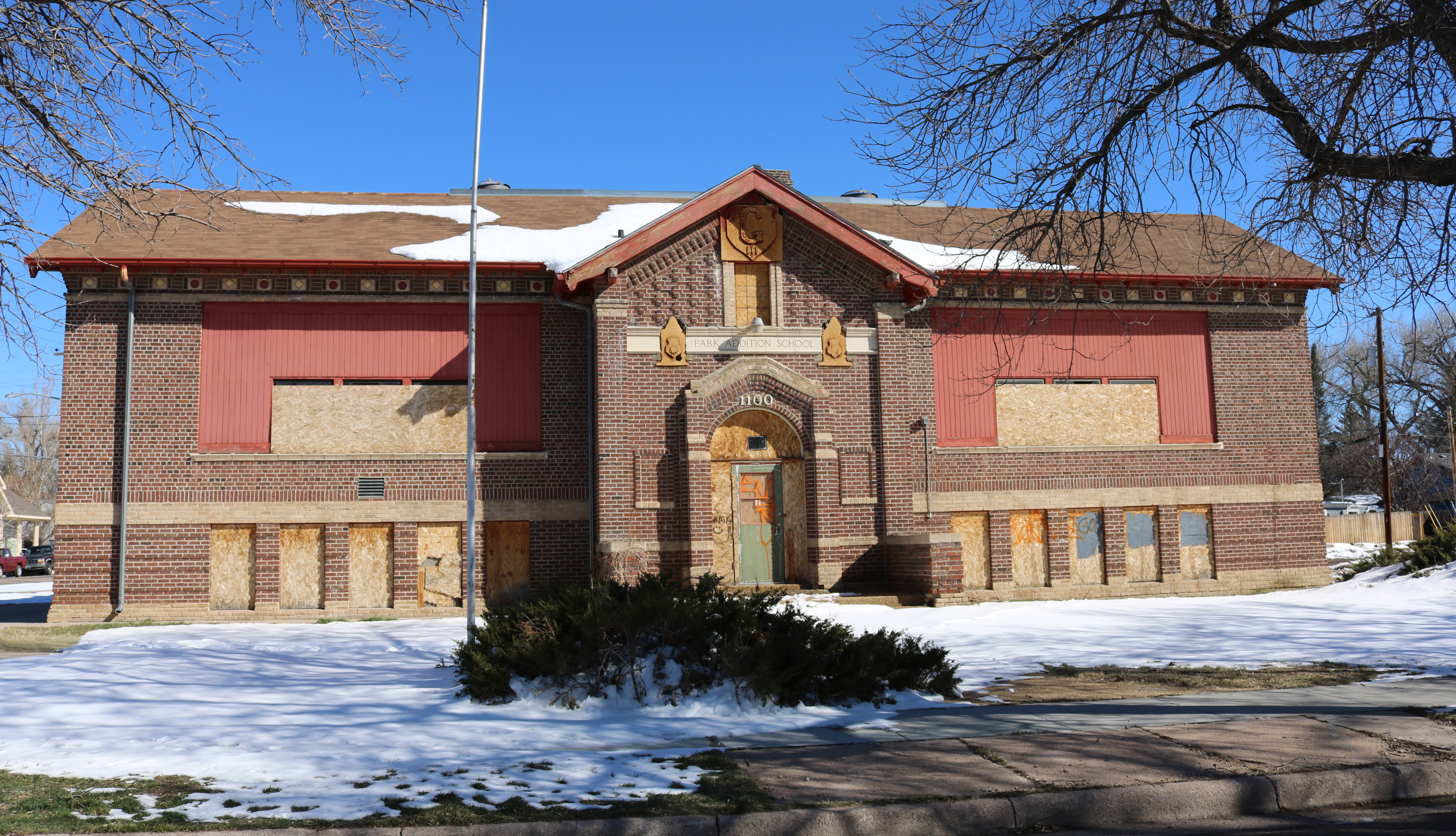
- The school in 2016.

- Location within Wyoming Location within the United States
- Location: 1100 Richardson Court, Cheyenne, Wyoming
- Coordinates: 41°08′34″N 104°50′02″W
- Area: 1.6 acres (0.65 ha)
- Built: 1921
- Architect: Porter, Frederick Hutchinson; Allison, Archie
- Architectural style: Prairie School, Bungalow/craftsman
- MPS: Public Schools in Cheyenne, Wyoming MPS
- NRHP reference No.: 05000703
- Added to NRHP: August 22, 2005

The Park Addition School at 1100 Richardson Court in Cheyenne, Wyoming was built in 1921. It was designed by architect Frederick Hutchinson Porter. Due to population growth, an addition was built during the 1947–1949 school year, and the school was renamed "Chaplin School" in the honor of Miss Ruth Chaplin who served as principal from its inception until the 1952–1953 school year. At this point, and due to further growth, the city of Cheyenne made available a portion of Pioneer Park, two blocks from the school, for expansion. The new "Chaplin Annex" was finished in 1953, with another addition built in 1956. Since the new separate annex had grown to at least twice the size of the Park addition, it was renamed "Pioneer Park" school, and an effort to consolidate both schools into the new larger facility ensued. The original Park Addition building was henceforth used for school administrative offices. In 1977 the building and land was sold by the school district to a private owner, and eventually became a day care establishment called "Children's Choice Childcare Center" in the early 1980s. The Park Addition structure was listed on the National Register of Historic Places in 2005. As of 2016-2017 the property is under extensive restoration to return it to its glory days, and will soon be once again used.

== Gallery ==
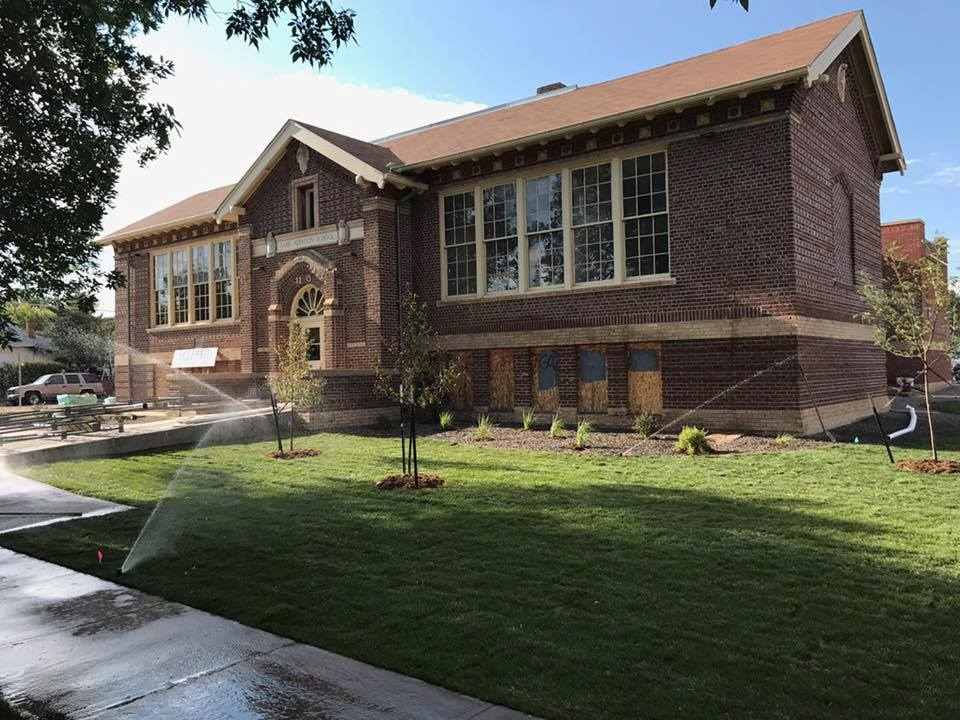
The restoration of the Park Addition School in progress.

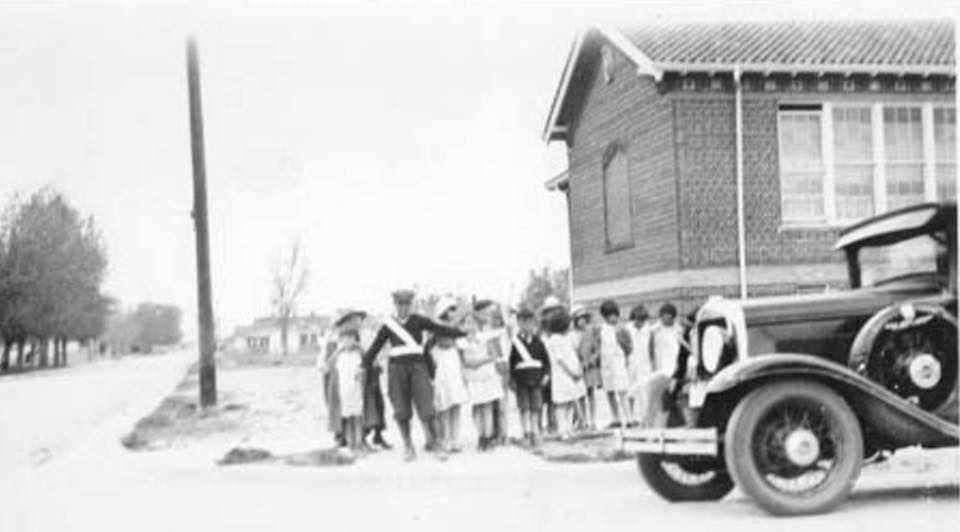
The Park Addition School just after opening.

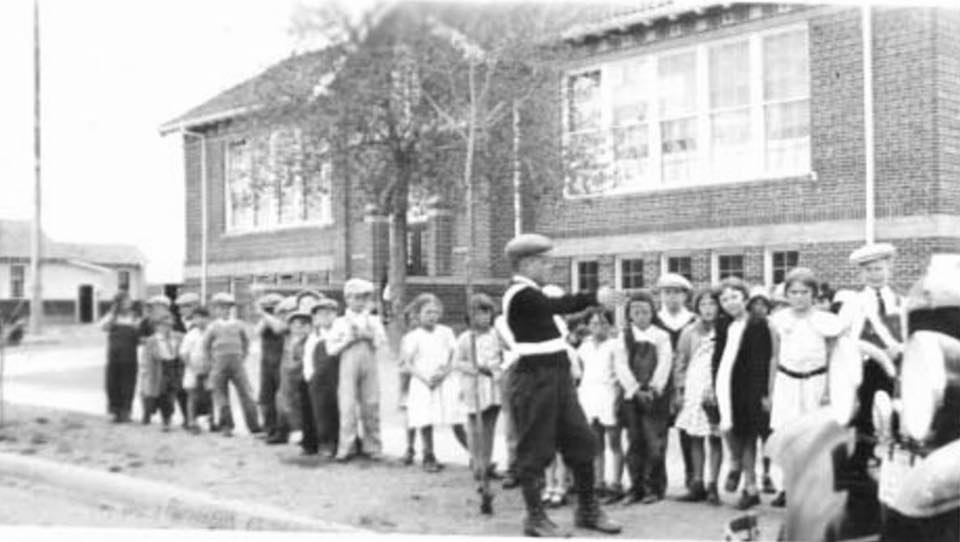
The Park Addition School just after opening.

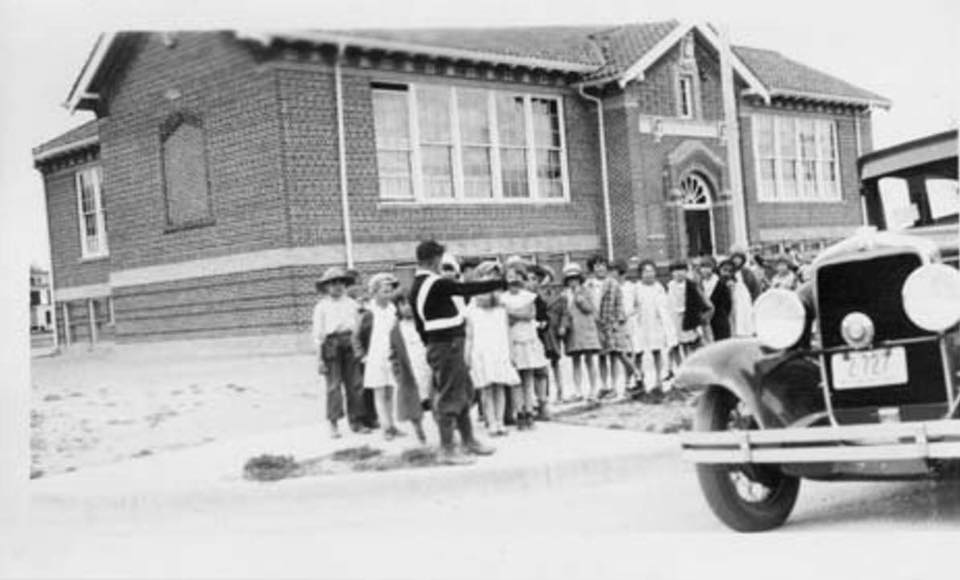
The Park Addition School just after opening.

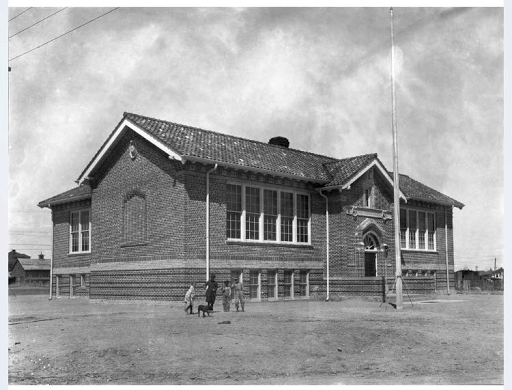
The Park Addition School, year of construction 1921
