= Masonic Temple (Cheyenne, Wyoming) =

- U.S. National Register of Historic Places
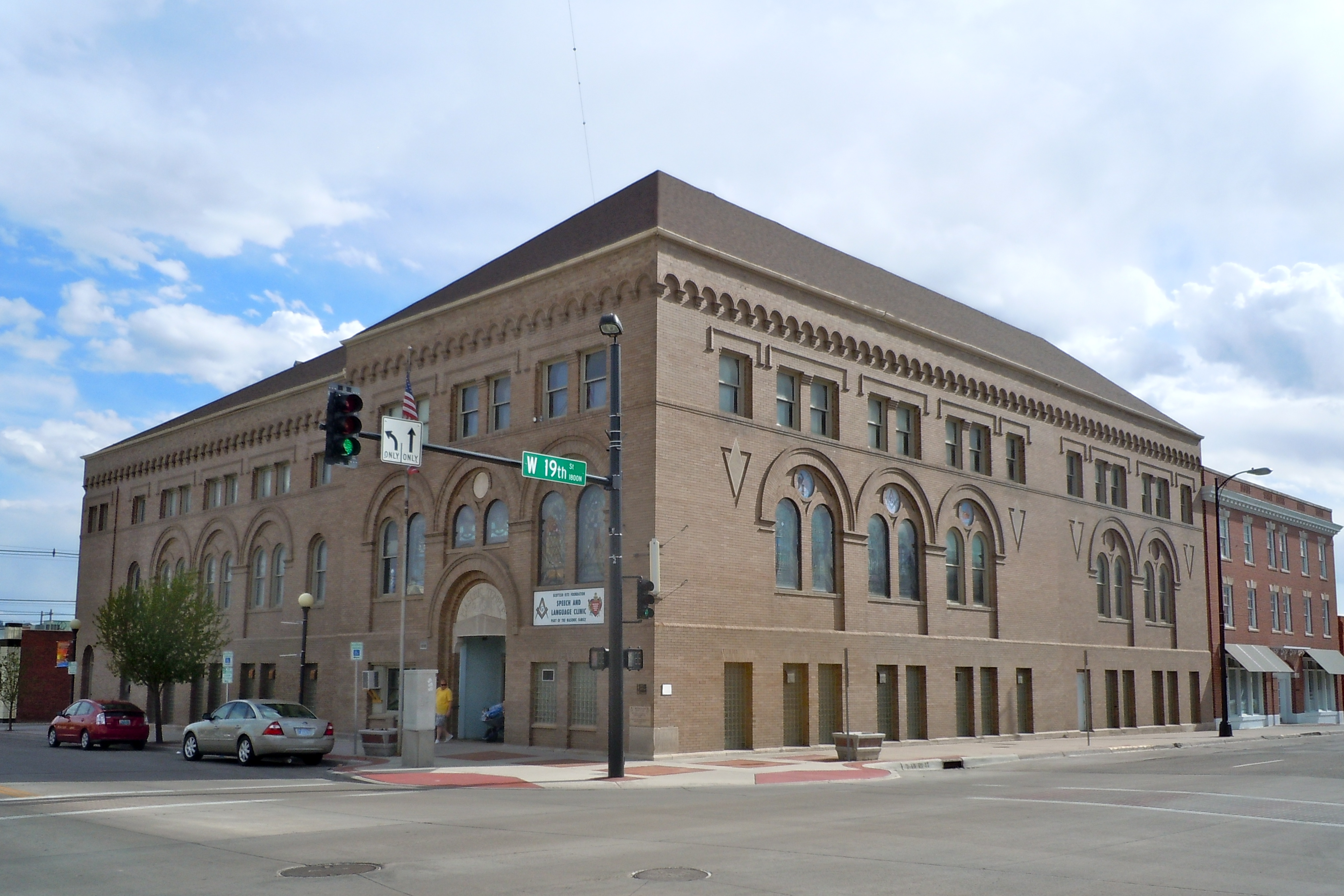

- Location within Wyoming Location within the United States
- Location: 1820 Capitol Ave., Cheyenne, Wyoming
- Coordinates: 41°8′6″N 104°49′0″W
- Area: less than one acre
- Built: 1901, 1903, 1929
- Architectural style: Late 19th And 20th Century Revivals, Second Renaissance Revival
- NRHP reference No.: 84000162
- Added to NRHP: October 25, 1984

The Masonic Temple in Cheyenne, Wyoming, is a building dating from 1901. It was listed on the National Register of Historic Places in 1984.

It is a 3-story buff brick-veneer building with a concrete foundation. The building burned in 1903 and was rebuilt with very few changes. An addition was added in 1929.
