= Joseph C. O'Mahoney Federal Center =

- United States Post Office and Court House
- U.S. National Register of Historic Places
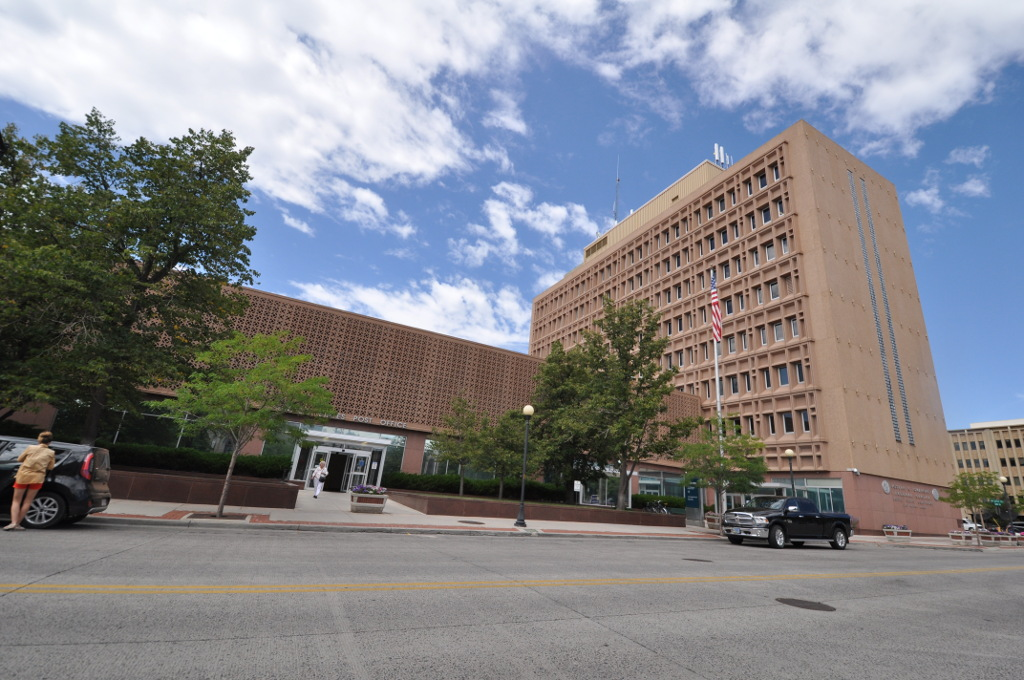

- Location within Wyoming
- Location: 2120 Capitol Ave., Cheyenne, Wyoming
- Coordinates: 41°08′15″N 104°49′07″W
- Built: 1965
- Built by: J. W. Bateson Construction Co.
- Architect: Porter & Porter, J. T. Banner & Associates
- Architectural style: Modern Movement
- MPS: Historic US Post Offices in Wyoming, 1900--1941, TR
- NRHP reference No.: 100001052
- Added to NRHP: June 5, 2017

The United States Post Office and Court House in is a federal building located in Cheyenne, Wyoming, also called the Joseph C. O'Mahoney Federal Center it was listed on the National Register of Historic Places in 2017.

By the 1960s federal agencies had outgrown the nearby 1932 Federal Office Building. In response plans were drafted for an eight-story office building and court house with attached post office. Construction began in 1963. Porter & Porter and J. T. Banner & Associates of Laramie were the architects. Construction was handled by the J. W. Bateson Construction Co. of Dallas, Texas. The Modern Movement building was completed in 1965. The Post Office section is two stories. By 1973 the building was renamed in honor of Joseph C. O'Mahoney who represented Wyoming in the United States Senate from 1934-1953 and 1954-1961.
