= Cheyenne, Wyoming =

Capital and most populous city of Wyoming, US

Cheyenne
- State capital and city
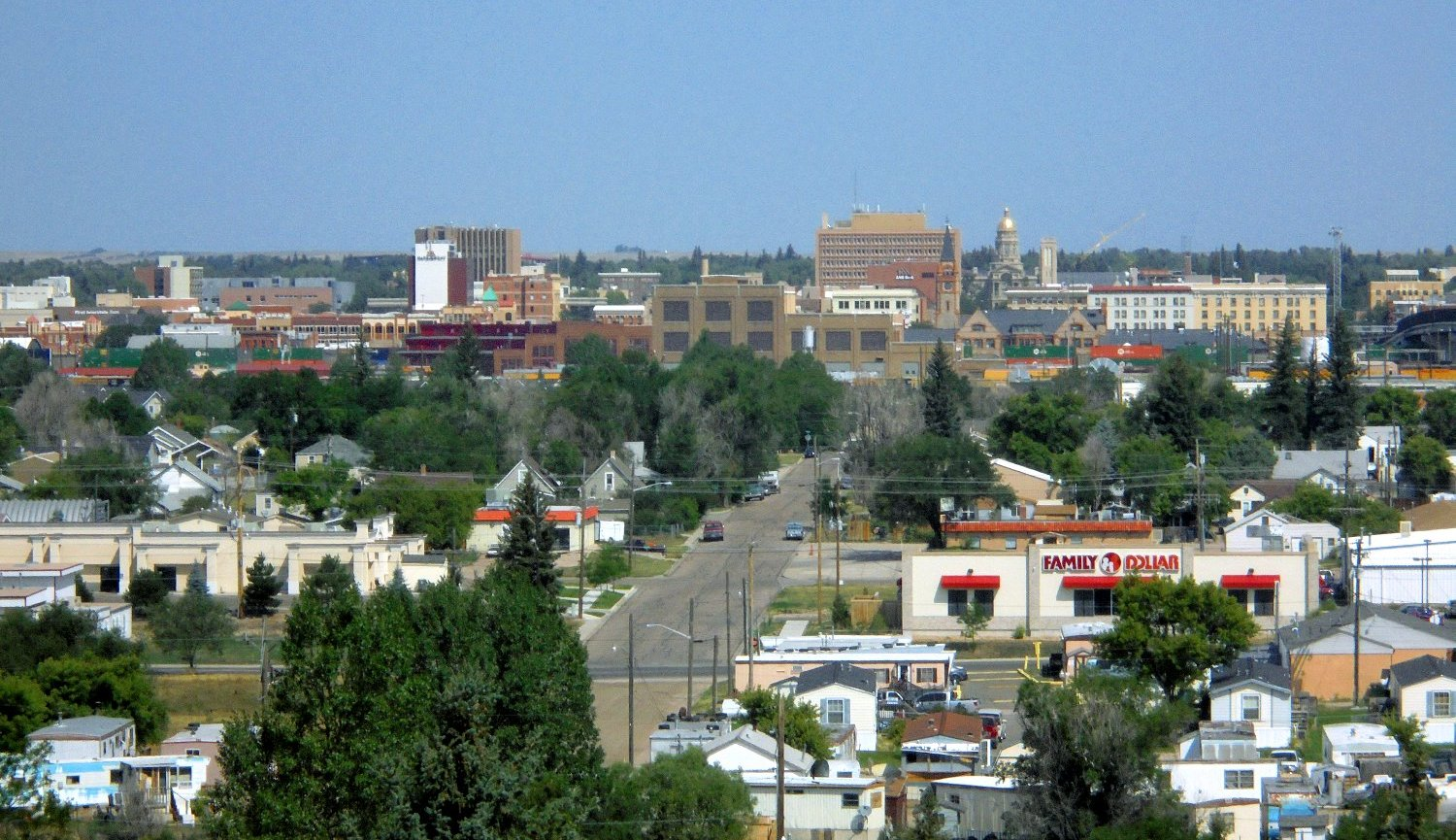
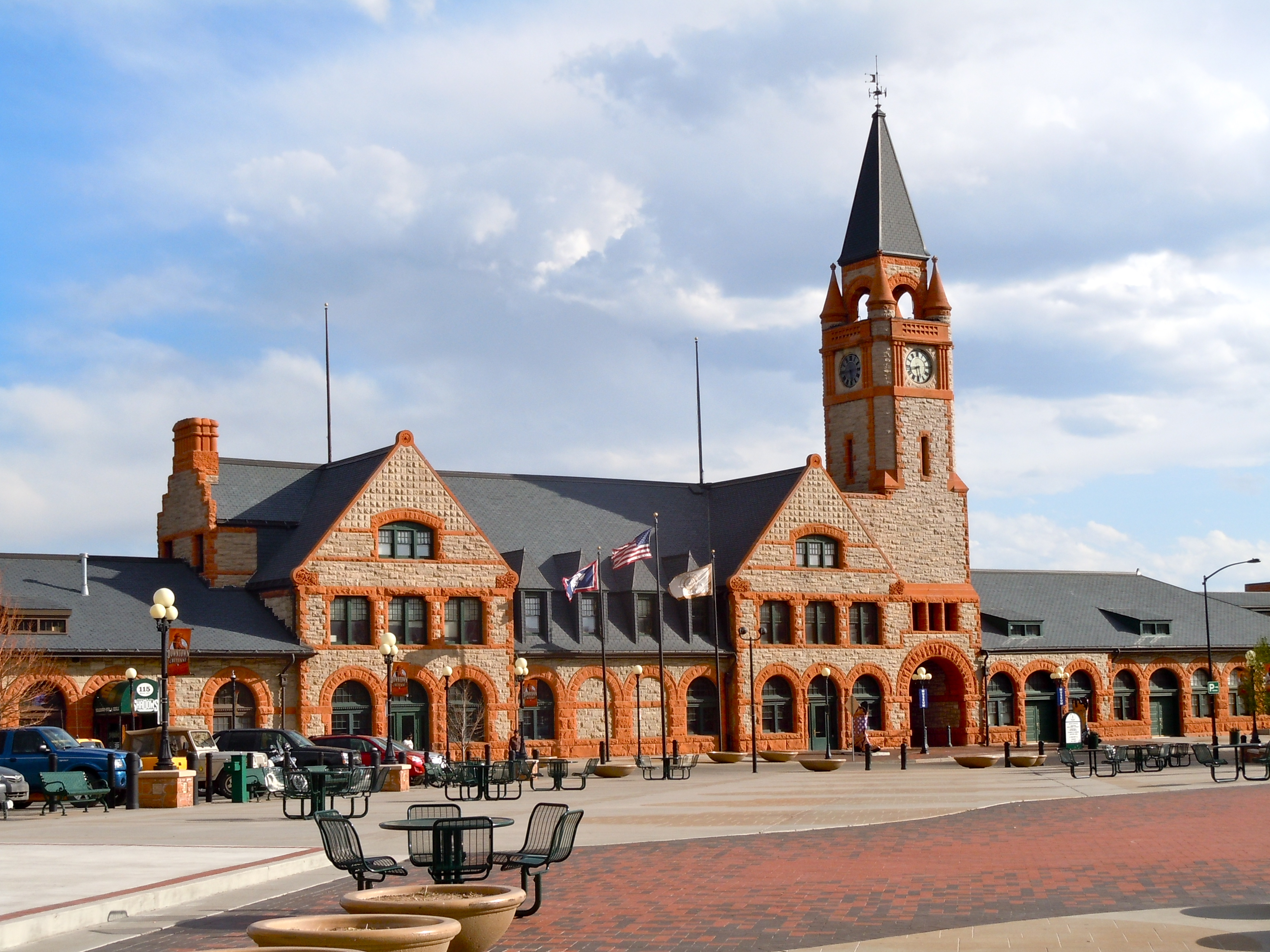
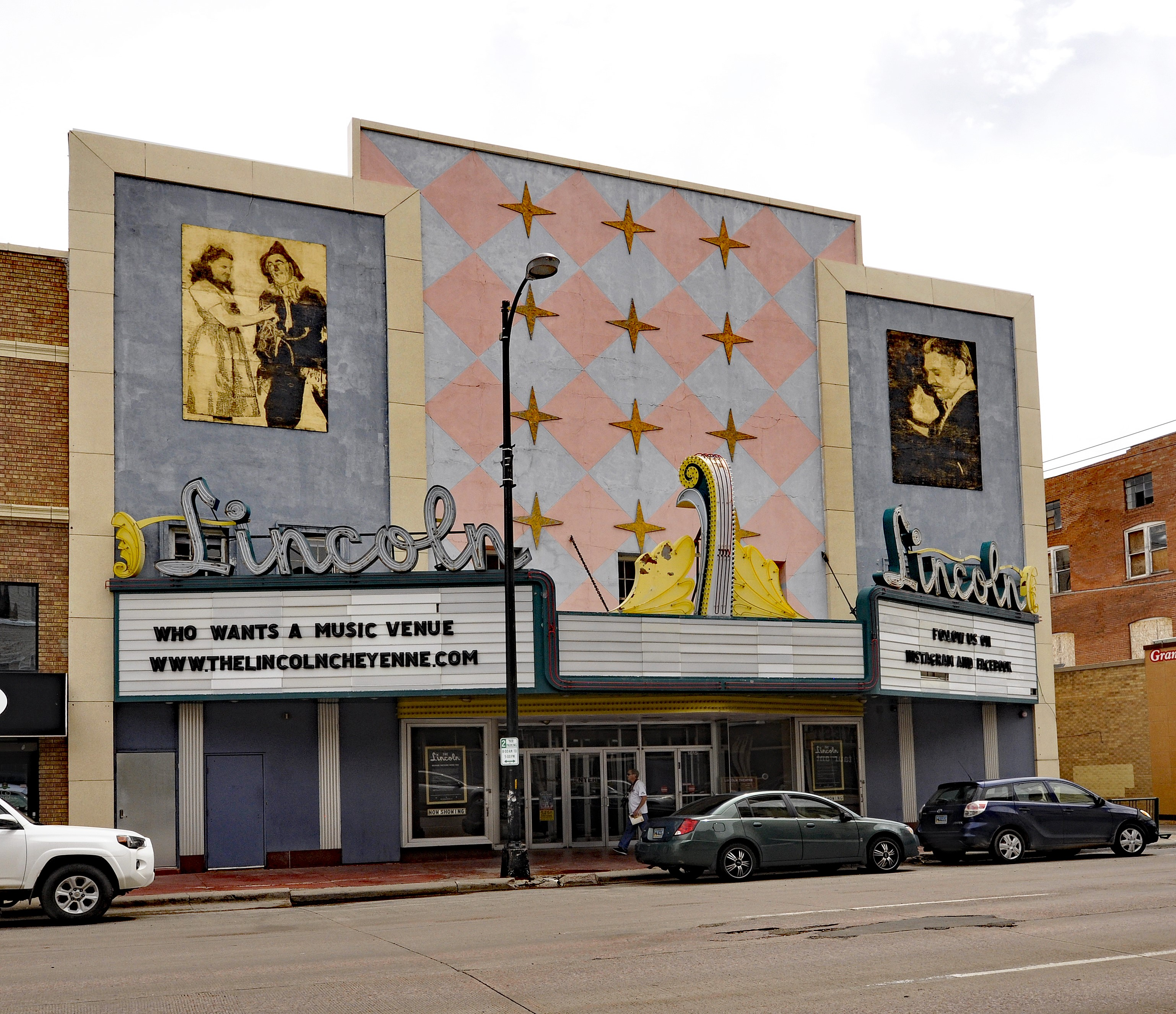
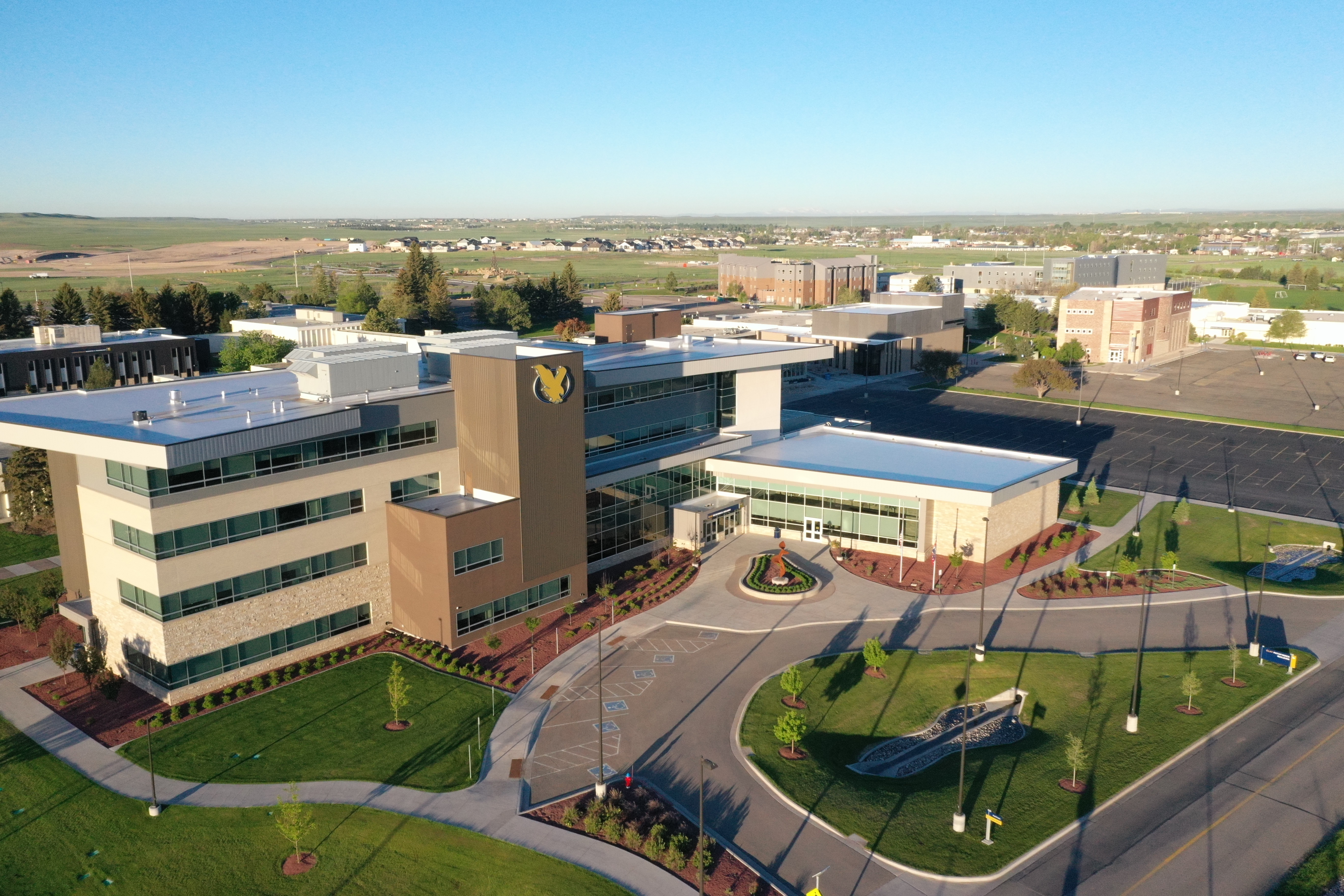
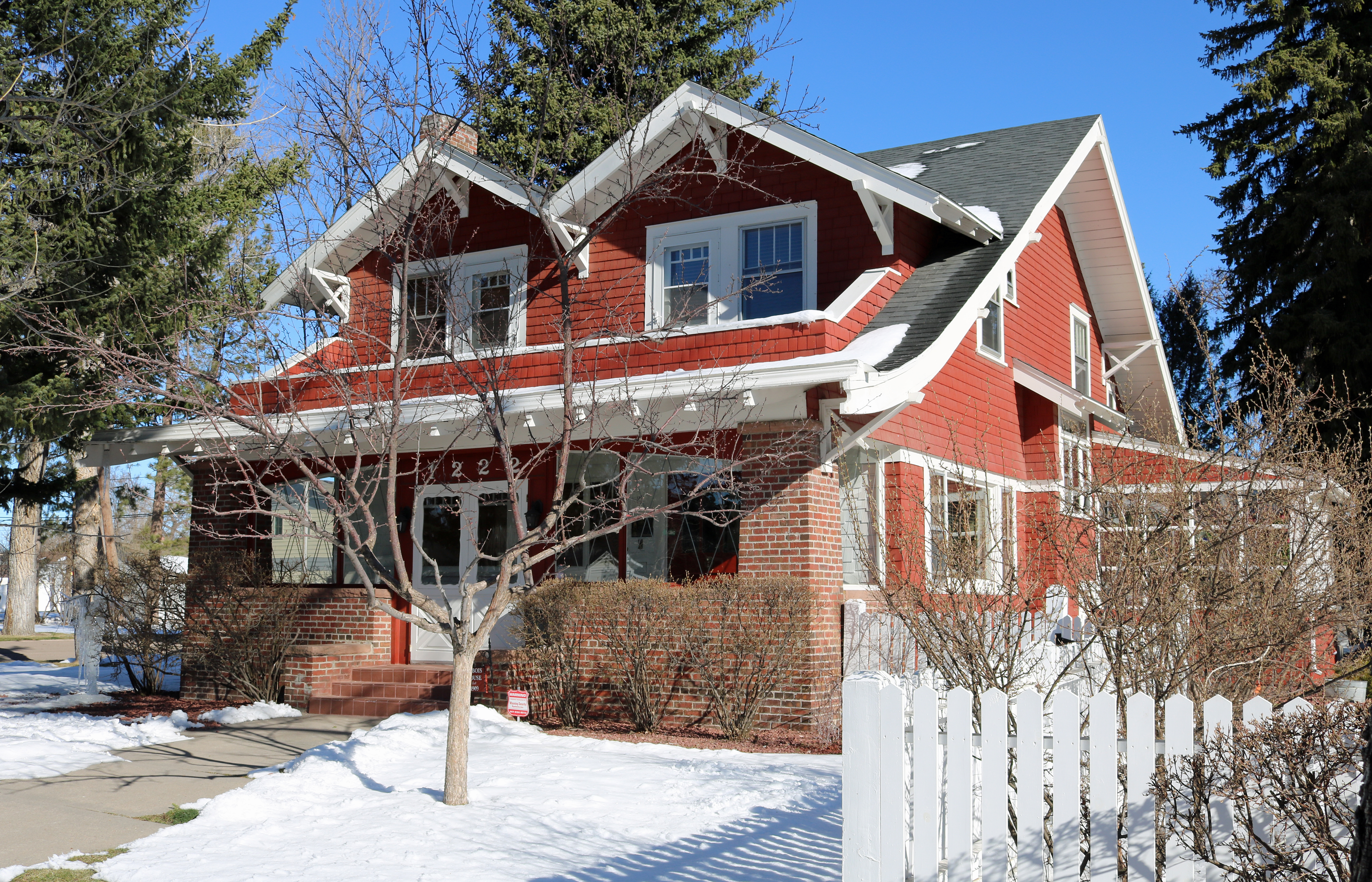
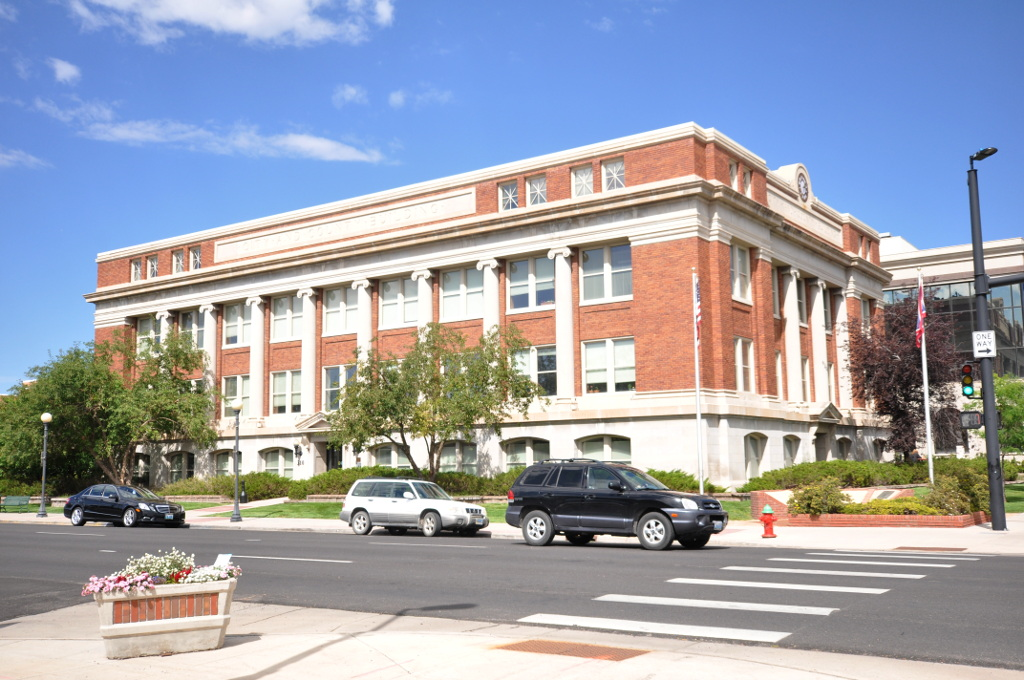
- Downtown Cheyenne, looking north from I-80 Cheyenne Depot Museum Lincoln Theater Laramie County Community College Dubois Block City and County Building

- Flag Seal
- Nickname: "Magic City of the Plains" (historic)
- Location in Laramie County in Wyoming
- Coordinates: 41°07′16″N 104°47′23″W
- Country: United States
- State: Wyoming
- County: Laramie
- Founded: 1867
- Named for: Cheyenne people

Government
  - Mayor: Patrick Collins

Area
  - Total: 32.37 sq mi (83.84 km^{2})
  - Land: 32.26 sq mi (83.55 km^{2})
  - Water: 0.11 sq mi (0.29 km^{2}) 0.45%
- Elevation: 6,086 ft (1,855 m)

Population (2020)
  - Total: 65,132
  - Density: 1,991.23/sq mi (768.82/km^{2})
- Demonym: Cheyenneite
- Time zone: UTC−7 (Mountain)
  - Summer (DST): UTC−6 (Mountain)
- ZIP Code: 82001–82003, 82006–82010
- Area code: 307
- GNIS feature ID: 2409445
- FIPS code: 56-13900
- Website: cheyennecity.org

Cheyenne (/ʃaɪˈæn/ shy-AN or /ʃaɪˈɛn/ shy-EN) is the capital and most populous city of the U.S. state of Wyoming. Its population was 65,132 at the 2020 census, while the Cheyenne metropolitan area encompassing all of Laramie County had an estimated 102,000 residents. Cheyenne is situated on Crow Creek and Dry Creek. It is the county seat of Laramie County.

Cheyenne was established within the Dakota Territory in 1867 as a junction along the Union Pacific Railroad. Local residents named the town for the Cheyenne people. Its economy is anchored by government services, transportation, and military operations, notably Francis E. Warren Air Force Base, with emerging growth in data centers and renewable energy. Cheyenne hosts cultural institutions such as the Wyoming State Museum and Cheyenne Frontier Days Old West Museum and is known for the annual Cheyenne Frontier Days, a longstanding rodeo and cultural event. Cheyenne is the northern terminus of the extensive Southern Rocky Mountain Front.

== History ==
At a celebration on July 4, 1867, Grenville M. Dodge of the Union Pacific Railroad announced the selection of a townsite for its mountain region headquarters adjacent to the bridge the railroad planned to build across Crow Creek in the Territory of Dakota. At the same celebration, Major General Christopher C. Augur announced the selection of a site three miles (5 km) west of Crow Creek Crossing for a U.S. Army fort to protect the railroad.

The Union Pacific Railroad platted its Crow Creek Crossing townsite on July 5, 1867. Residents named the town Cheyenne for the Cheyenne Native American people. On August 8, 1867, the Town of Cheyenne, Dakota Territory was incorporated, and on August 10, 1867, H. M. Hook was elected as Cheyenne's first mayor. The tracks of the Union Pacific Railroad reached Cheyenne on November 13, 1867, and the first train arrived the following day. Cheyenne grew so quickly, it gained the nickname of "Magic City of the Plains".

On September 8, 1867, the United States Army established Fort D. A. Russell in honor of Brigadier General David Allen Russell. Initially a cavalry encampment, construction of the fort began the following month. The fort was renamed Fort Francis E. Warren in 1930 in honor of the first governor of the State of Wyoming, Francis E. Warren. The fort was transferred to the new United States Air Force and was renamed Francis E. Warren Air Force Base in October 1949.

On July 25, 1868, the United States organized the Territory of Wyoming. Territorial Governor John Allen Campbell arrived in Cheyenne on May 7, 1869, and named Cheyenne the temporary territorial capital. Cheyenne has remained the only capital of Wyoming. On December 10, 1869, the first session of the Wyoming Territorial Legislature met in Cheyenne. That day, the legislature passed and Territorial Governor Campbell signed an act to reincorporate the Town of Cheyenne, Wyoming Territory, and an act granting women the right to vote, the first U.S. state or territory to grant suffrage to women.

On July 10, 1890, the Territory of Wyoming was admitted to the Union as the State of Wyoming. The Wyoming State Capitol was constructed between 1886 and 1890, with further improvements being completed in 1917.

The Cheyenne Regional Airport was opened in 1920, initially serving as a stop for airmail. It soon developed into a civil-military airport, serving DC-3s and various military craft. During World War II, hundreds of B-17s, B-24s, and PBYs were outfitted and upgraded at the airfield. Today, it serves a number of military functions and as a high-altitude testbed for civilian craft.

== Geography ==
Lying near the southeast corner of the state, Cheyenne is one of the least centrally located state capitals in the nation (together with cities such as Carson City, Nevada; Juneau, Alaska; Tallahassee, Florida; Topeka, Kansas; and Trenton, New Jersey).

According to the United States Census Bureau, the city has a total area of 24.63 square miles (63.79 km^{2}), of which 0.11 sq mi (0.28 km^{2}) is covered by water.

=== Climate ===
Climate chart for Cheyenne

Cheyenne, like much of Wyoming, has a cold semiarid climate (Köppen climate classification BSk) and is part of USDA hardiness zone 5b, with the suburbs falling in zone 5a. Winters are cold and moderately long, but relatively dry, with highs often above freezing, having a normal mean temperature of 27.7 °F (−2.4 °C), highs that fail to breach freezing for 35 days per year, and lows that dip to the 0 °F (−18 °C) mark on 9.2 mornings. However, the cold is often interrupted, with chinook winds blowing downslope from the Rockies that can bring warm conditions, bringing the high above 50 °F (10 °C) on 20 days from December to February.

While December is the coldest month, snowfall is greatest in March and April, seasonally averaging 60 inches (1,500 mm), historically ranging from 13.1 inches (330 mm) between July 1965 and June 1966 up to 121.5 inches (3,090 mm) between July 1979 and June 1980, yet thick snow cover rarely stays. Summers are warm, with a high diurnal temperature range; July averages 69.4 °F (20.8 °C), and highs reach 90 °F (32 °C) on average for 12 afternoons annually. Spring and autumn are quick transitions, with the average window for freezing temperatures being September 29 thru May 14, allowing a growing season of 106 days. Official record temperatures range from −38 °F (−39 °C) on January 9, 1875, up to 100 °F (38 °C) on June 23, 1954, the last of four occurrences; the record cold daily maximum is −21 °F (−29 °C) on January 11, 1963, while, conversely, the record warm daily minimum is 68 °F (20 °C) on July 31, 1960. The annual precipitation of 15.9 inches (400 mm) tends to be concentrated from May to August and is low during fall and winter; it has historically ranged from 5.04 inches (128.0 mm) in 1876 to 23.69 inches (602 mm) in 1942.

The city averages below 60% daily relative humidity in each month and receives an average 2,980 hours (about 67% of the possible total) of sunshine annually. On July 16, 1979, an F3 tornado struck Cheyenne, causing one death and 40 injuries. It was the most destructive tornado in Wyoming history.

Climate data for Cheyenne Regional Airport, Wyoming (1991–2020 normals, (Note: Mean monthly maxima and minima (i.e. the expected highest and lowest temperature readings at any point during the year or given month) calculated based on data at said location from 1991 to 2020.) extremes 1872−present (Note: Official records for Cheyenne kept at the City Office from January 1871 to August 1935 and at Cheyenne Regional since September 1935.))
Month	Jan	Feb	Mar	Apr	May	Jun	Jul	Aug	Sep	Oct	Nov	Dec	Year
Record high °F (°C)	70 (21)	71 (22)	83 (28)	84 (29)	91 (33)	100 (38)	100 (38)	98 (37)	97 (36)	85 (29)	75 (24)	70 (21)	100 (38)
Mean maximum °F (°C)	58.4 (14.7)	60.0 (15.6)	68.6 (20.3)	74.8 (23.8)	82.7 (28.2)	90.8 (32.7)	94.4 (34.7)	92.5 (33.6)	88.1 (31.2)	78.5 (25.8)	67.2 (19.6)	58.8 (14.9)	95.2 (35.1)
Mean daily maximum °F (°C)	40.0 (4.4)	40.6 (4.8)	49.1 (9.5)	54.8 (12.7)	64.4 (18.0)	76.7 (24.8)	84.1 (28.9)	82.0 (27.8)	73.3 (22.9)	59.1 (15.1)	47.5 (8.6)	39.3 (4.1)	59.2 (15.1)
Daily mean °F (°C)	29.2 (−1.6)	29.5 (−1.4)	37.1 (2.8)	42.8 (6.0)	52.3 (11.3)	63.1 (17.3)	70.1 (21.2)	68.1 (20.1)	59.6 (15.3)	46.5 (8.1)	36.1 (2.3)	28.7 (−1.8)	46.9 (8.3)
Mean daily minimum °F (°C)	18.4 (−7.6)	18.4 (−7.6)	25.1 (−3.8)	30.8 (−0.7)	40.2 (4.6)	49.4 (9.7)	56.1 (13.4)	54.3 (12.4)	45.8 (7.7)	33.9 (1.1)	24.7 (−4.1)	18.1 (−7.7)	34.6 (1.4)
Mean minimum °F (°C)	−5.8 (−21.0)	−3.8 (−19.9)	6.6 (−14.1)	16.2 (−8.8)	26.6 (−3.0)	38.5 (3.6)	47.1 (8.4)	44.8 (7.1)	31.9 (−0.1)	16.4 (−8.7)	3.2 (−16.0)	−4.7 (−20.4)	−13.0 (−25.0)
Record low °F (°C)	−38 (−39)	−34 (−37)	−21 (−29)	−8 (−22)	8 (−13)	25 (−4)	33 (1)	25 (−4)	8 (−13)	−5 (−21)	−21 (−29)	−28 (−33)	−38 (−39)
Average precipitation inches (mm)	0.35 (8.9)	0.52 (13)	0.96 (24)	1.79 (45)	2.44 (62)	2.16 (55)	2.11 (54)	1.52 (39)	1.47 (37)	1.00 (25)	0.61 (15)	0.48 (12)	15.41 (391)
Average snowfall inches (cm)	6.3 (16)	9.0 (23)	9.7 (25)	11.3 (29)	3.4 (8.6)	0.0 (0.0)	0.0 (0.0)	0.0 (0.0)	1.0 (2.5)	5.9 (15)	7.5 (19)	8.8 (22)	62.9 (160)
Average extreme snow depth inches (cm)	3.8 (9.7)	3.9 (9.9)	3.8 (9.7)	3.4 (8.6)	1.7 (4.3)	0.0 (0.0)	0.0 (0.0)	0.0 (0.0)	0.5 (1.3)	2.8 (7.1)	4.0 (10)	4.4 (11)	8.5 (22)
Average precipitation days (≥ 0.01 in)	5.1	6.9	7.9	10.6	12.9	10.7	10.5	10.3	7.3	7.1	6.2	6.0	101.5
Average snowy days (≥ 0.1 in)	5.9	7.3	6.8	6.8	1.9	0.1	0.0	0.0	0.5	3.2	5.8	6.7	45.0
Average relative humidity (%)	52.5	54.6	56.1	54.3	55.8	53.5	51.3	51.4	51.5	50.0	53.6	54.0	53.2
Average dew point °F (°C)	9.9 (−12.3)	12.7 (−10.7)	17.1 (−8.3)	24.1 (−4.4)	33.3 (0.7)	41.4 (5.2)	46.2 (7.9)	44.4 (6.9)	35.8 (2.1)	25.5 (−3.6)	17.4 (−8.1)	11.1 (−11.6)	26.6 (−3.0)
Mean monthly sunshine hours	190.7	202.6	253.1	271.9	291.9	303.2	317.5	297.4	262.3	237.0	178.8	175.4	2,981.8
Percentage possible sunshine	64	68	68	68	65	67	69	70	70	69	60	61	67
Average ultraviolet index	1.7	2.7	4.5	6.4	8.2	9.7	10.2	8.8	6.5	3.9	2.2	1.4	5.5
Source 1: NOAA (relative humidity, dew points and sun 1961−1990)
Source 2: UV Index Today (1995 to 2022)

Climate data for Cheyenne
Month	Jan	Feb	Mar	Apr	May	Jun	Jul	Aug	Sep	Oct	Nov	Dec	Year
Mean daily daylight hours	10.0	11.0	12.0	13.0	15.0	15.0	15.0	14.0	12.0	11.0	10.0	9.0	12.3
Average Ultraviolet index	2	3	5	7	9	10	10	9	7	4	2	1	5.8
Source: Weather Atlas

See or edit raw graph data.

== Demographics ==
Historical population
Census	Pop.	Note	%±
1870	1,450		—
1880	3,456		138.3%
1890	11,690		238.3%
1900	14,087		20.5%
1910	11,320		−19.6%
1920	13,829		22.2%
1930	17,361		25.5%
1940	22,474		29.5%
1950	31,935		42.1%
1960	43,505		36.2%
1970	41,254		−5.2%
1980	47,283		14.6%
1990	50,008		5.8%
2000	53,011		6.0%
2010	59,466		12.2%
2020	65,132		9.5%
2023 (est.)	65,168		0.1%
U.S. Decennial Census; 1870–2000 census

=== Racial and ethnic composition ===
Cheyenne city, Wyoming – Racial and ethnic composition Note: the US Census treats Hispanic/Latino as an ethnic category. This table excludes Latinos from the racial categories and assigns them to a separate category. Hispanics/Latinos may be of any race.
Race / Ethnicity (NH = Non-Hispanic)	2020	2010	2000	1990	1980
White alone (NH)	73.6% (47,908)	78.7% (46,818)	81.4% (43,146)	83.3% (41,675)	84.3% (39,861)
Black alone (NH)	2.4% (1,577)	2.6% (1,567)	2.6% (1,399)	3% (1,506)	2.7% (1,273)
American Indian alone (NH)	0.6% (401)	0.6% (371)	0.6% (329)	0.8% (422)	0.7% (329)
Asian alone (NH)	1.4% (935)	1.2% (698)	1% (538)	1.1% (550)	0.8% (360)
Pacific Islander alone (NH)	0.2% (107)	0.2% (95)	0.1% (45)		
Other race alone (NH)	0.5% (313)	0.1% (71)	0.1% (57)	0.1% (51)	0% (18)
Multiracial (NH)	5% (3,251)	2.1% (1,252)	1.6% (851)	—	—
Hispanic/Latino (any race)	16.3% (10,640)	14.5% (8,594)	12.5% (6,646)	11.6% (5,804)	11.5% (5,442)

=== 2020 census ===
As of the 2020 census, Cheyenne had a population of 65,132. The median age was 37.6 years; 22.7% of residents were under 18 and 17.4% were 65 or older. For every 100 females, there were 98.7 males, and for every 100 females 18 and over, there were 97.1 males 18 and over.

Almost all of the residents lived in urban areas, while 0.2% lived in rural areas.

Of the 28,184 households in Cheyenne, 27.4% had children under 18 living in them, 42.7% were married-couple households, 22.4% were households with a male householder and no spouse or partner present, and 27.7% were households with a female householder and no spouse or partner present. About 35.1% of all households were made up of individuals, and 13.6% had someone living alone who was 65 years of age or older.

The city had 29,986 housing units, of which 6.0% were vacant. The homeowner vacancy rate was 1.2% and the rental vacancy rate was 6.5%.

Racial composition as of the 2020 census
Race	Number	Percentage
White	51,728	79.4%
Black or African American	1,758	2.7%
American Indian and Alaska Native	778	1.2%
Asian	985	1.5%
Native Hawaiian and other Pacific Islander	132	0.2%
Some other race	2,880	4.4%
Two or more races	6,871	10.5%
Hispanic or Latino (of any race)	10,640	16.3%

The U.S. Census Bureau estimated the racial and ethnic makeup of the city was 77.1% non-Hispanic white, 1.7% Black or African American, 0.6% American Indian or Alaska Native, 1.5% Asian, 0.2% Native Hawaiian or other Pacific Islander, 6.7% two or more races, and 15.9% Hispanic or Latin American of any race, in 2020.

The most reported detailed racial/ethnic groups in 2020 were:

- German (22.8%)
- English (19.9%)
- Irish (16.3%)
- Mexican (10.8%)
- Scottish (4.4%)
- Italian (3.7%)
- French (2.9%)
- Spanish (2.4%)
- Norwegian (2.3%)
- African American (2.3%)

=== 2015–2019 American Community Survey ===
At the 2019 American Community Survey, the city had an owner-occupied housing rate of 65.9% with a median value at $214,300. Households averaged 2.20 persons from 2015 to 2019. Residents of Cheyenne had a median household income of $64,598 and per capita of $35,637. An estimated 10.4% lived at or below the poverty line.

=== 2010 census ===
As of the census of 2010, 59,467 people, 25,558 households, and 15,270 families were living in the city. The population density was 2,425.2 inhabitants per square mile (936.4/km^{2}). The 27,284 housing units had an average density of 1,112.7 per square mile (429.6/km^{2}).

Of these households, 30.2% had children under 18 living with them, 43.1% were married couples living together, 12.0% had a female householder with no husband present, 4.7% had a male householder with no wife present, and 40.3% were not families. About 33.5% of all households were made up of individuals, and 10.6% had someone living alone who was 65 or older. The average household size was 2.29, and the average family size was 2.92.

The median age in the city was 36.5 years at the 2010 census. The age distribution was 24.0% under 18, 9.5% from 18 to 24, 26.9% from 25 to 44, 26.2% from 45 to 64, and 13.5% were 65 or older. The gender makeup of the city was 49.3% male and 50.7% female.

In 2010, the racial makeup of the city was 87.44% White, 2.88% African American, 0.96% Native American, 1.24% Asian, 0.20% Pacific Islander, 4.0% from other races, and 3.28% from two or more races. Hispanics or Latinos of any race were 14.45% of the population. At the 2005–2007 American Community Survey 3-Year Estimates, the city's population was 87.2% White (79.3% non-Hispanic White alone), 12.7% Hispanic or Latino (of any race), 4.5% Black or African American, 2.5% American Indian and Alaska Native, 2.1% Asian, and 6.4% from some other race.

=== 2000 census ===
As of the census of 2000, 53,011 people, 22,324 households, 14,175 families resided in the city, and 81,607 people lived in the metropolitan statistical area, making it the largest city and metropolitan area in Wyoming. The population density was 2,511.4 inhabitants per square mile (969.6/km^{2}). The 23,782 housing units had an average density of 1,126.7 per square mile (435.0/km^{2}).

Of these households, 30.4% had children under 18 living with them, 49.2% were married couples living together, 10.6% had a female householder with no husband present, and 36.5% were not families. About 31.3% of all households were made up of individuals, and 10.6% had someone living alone who was 65 or older. The average household size was 2.33, and the average family size was 2.93.

In 2000, the age distribution was 24.9% under 18, 8.8% from 18 to 24, 29.7% from 25 to 44, 22.8% from 45 to 64, and 13.8% were 65 or older. The median age was 37 years. For every 100 females, there were 95.3 males. For every 100 females 18 and over, there were 92.7 males.

In 2000, the racial makeup of the city was 88.1% White, 2.8% Black or African American, 0.8% Native American, 1.1% Asian, 0.1% Pacific Islander, 4.4% from other races, and 2.7% from two or more races. About 12.5% of the population were Hispanics or Latinos of any race.

The median income in the city for a household was $38,856 and for a family was $46,771. Males had a median income of $32,286 versus $24,529 for females. The per capita income for the city was $19,809. About 6.3% of families and 8.8% of the population were below the poverty line, including 11.1% of those under 8 and 5.8% of those 65 or over.

== Arts and culture ==
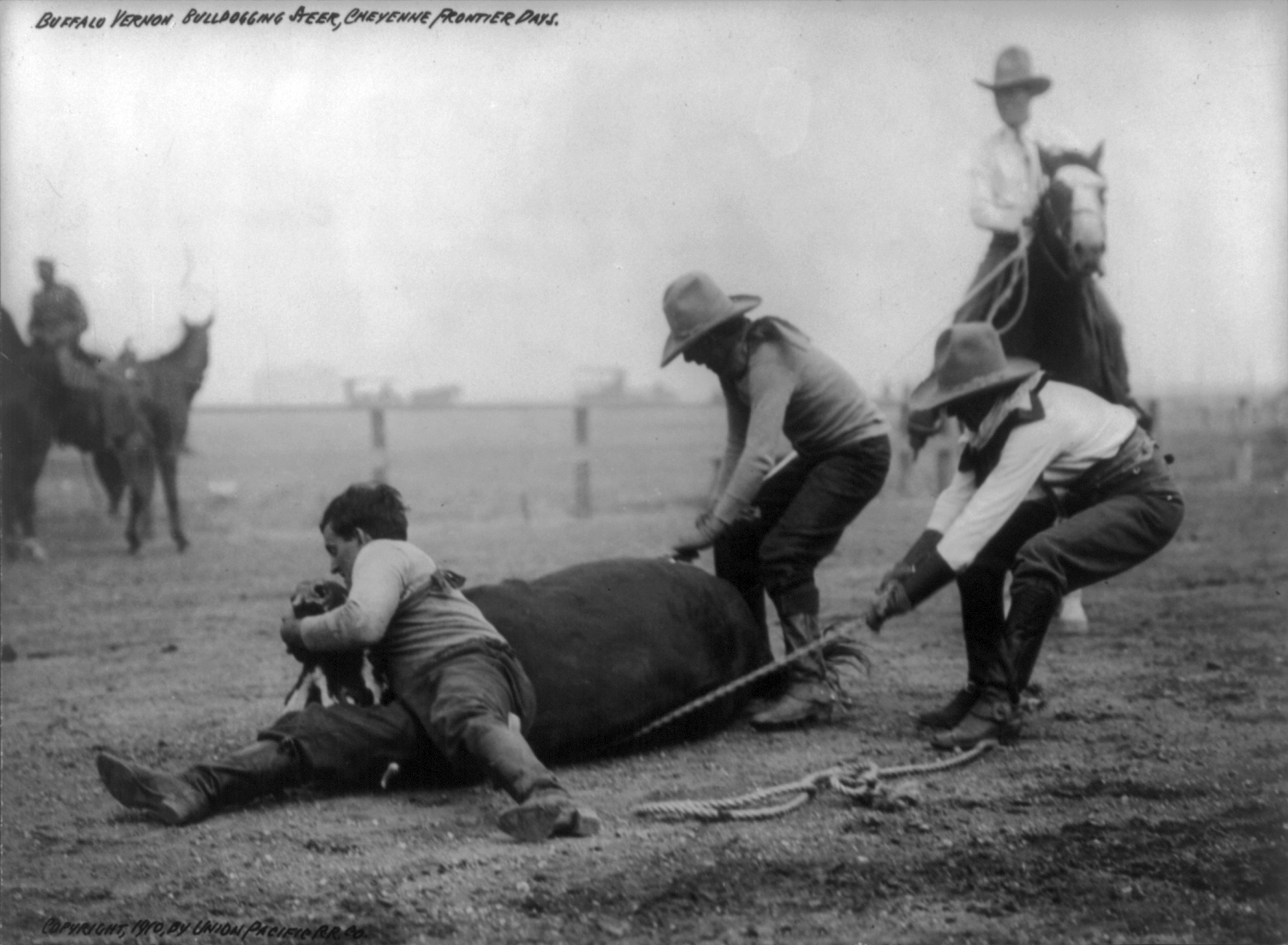
Bulldogging at Cheyenne Frontier Days, 1910

Cheyenne Frontier Days, which is held over 10 days centered around the last full week in July, is known as the largest outdoor rodeo and western festival in the world. The events include professional bull riding, calf roping, barrel racing, steer wrestling, team roping, bronc riding, steer roping, bareback riding, and many others. This week also has many parades and other events and a carnival with numerous rides, games, and shops. The festival has been held since 1897.

=== Landmarks ===
Cheyenne's VFW post (1980), a roadside attraction, photo by John Margolies

- Tivoli Building
- William Sturgis House
- Wyoming State Capitol
- F. E. Warren Air Force Base, one of the United States's oldest, continuously active installations (originally U.S. Army Fort D. A. Russell).
- Nagle Warren Mansion
- Frontier Mall

=== National Register of Historic Places ===
Over fifty different locations in Cheyenne are listed on the National Register of Historic Places, including:

- The Historic Plains Hotel (added 1978)
- Atlas Theatre (added 1973)
- Union Pacific Depot (Cheyenne Depot Museum) (1973)
- the Governor's Mansion (1969)
- Nagle-Warren Mansion (1976)
- First Presbyterian Church (1869)
- First United Methodist Church (1975)
- St. Mark's Episcopal Church (1970)
- St. Mary's Catholic Cathedral (1974)
- Cheyenne High School (2005)
- High Plains Horticulture Research Station (also known as High Plains Arboretum) (1930–1974)
- Storey Gymnasium (2005)
- Park Addition School (1970)
- Big Boy Steam Engine (1956)
- Botanic Gardens Rotary Century Plaza and Steam Locomotive (1921)

Several districts in the city are also listed, including:

- Downtown Cheyenne Historic District (1978, with boundary increase in 1980, 1988, 1996. Encompasses 205 acres (0.83 km^{2}) and 67 buildings)
- Lakeview Historic District (1996, 350 acres and 109 buildings)
- Rainsford Historic District (1984, 1980 acres and 288 buildings)
- Capitol North Historic District (1980, 204 acres and 112 buildings)
- Fort David A. Russell (1969, 6,300 acres and 19 buildings)
- Union Pacific Roundhouse, Turntable and Machine Shop (1992, 113 acres and 2 buildings)
- South Side Historic District (2006)

== Sports ==
Sports venues in Cheyenne include the Cheyenne Ice and Events Center, Pioneer Park, Powers Field, Bison Stadium, and Okie-Blanchard Stadium.

In 2012, the Cheyenne Warriors were founded as an American Professional Football League team. After playing a season in the APFL, they announced a move to the Indoor Football League. Shortly after the owner of the team died in December, the Warriors announced that they were forming the new Developmental Football League. In May 2013, after playing several games in this new league, the team folded.

In 2020, the city of Cheyenne was chosen to host the historical match between Canadian Dave Leduc, who was defending his Lethwei world title, against American challenger Cyrus Washington. The event marked the first time in the history of the ancient Burmese combat sport of Lethwei to be held in North America. The event was held at the Outlaw Saloon and was sanctioned by the World Lethwei Federation in partnership with the Wyoming Combat Sports Commission. As of 2024, Wyoming is the first and only US state to have legalized Lethwei in its territory.

== Parks and recreation ==
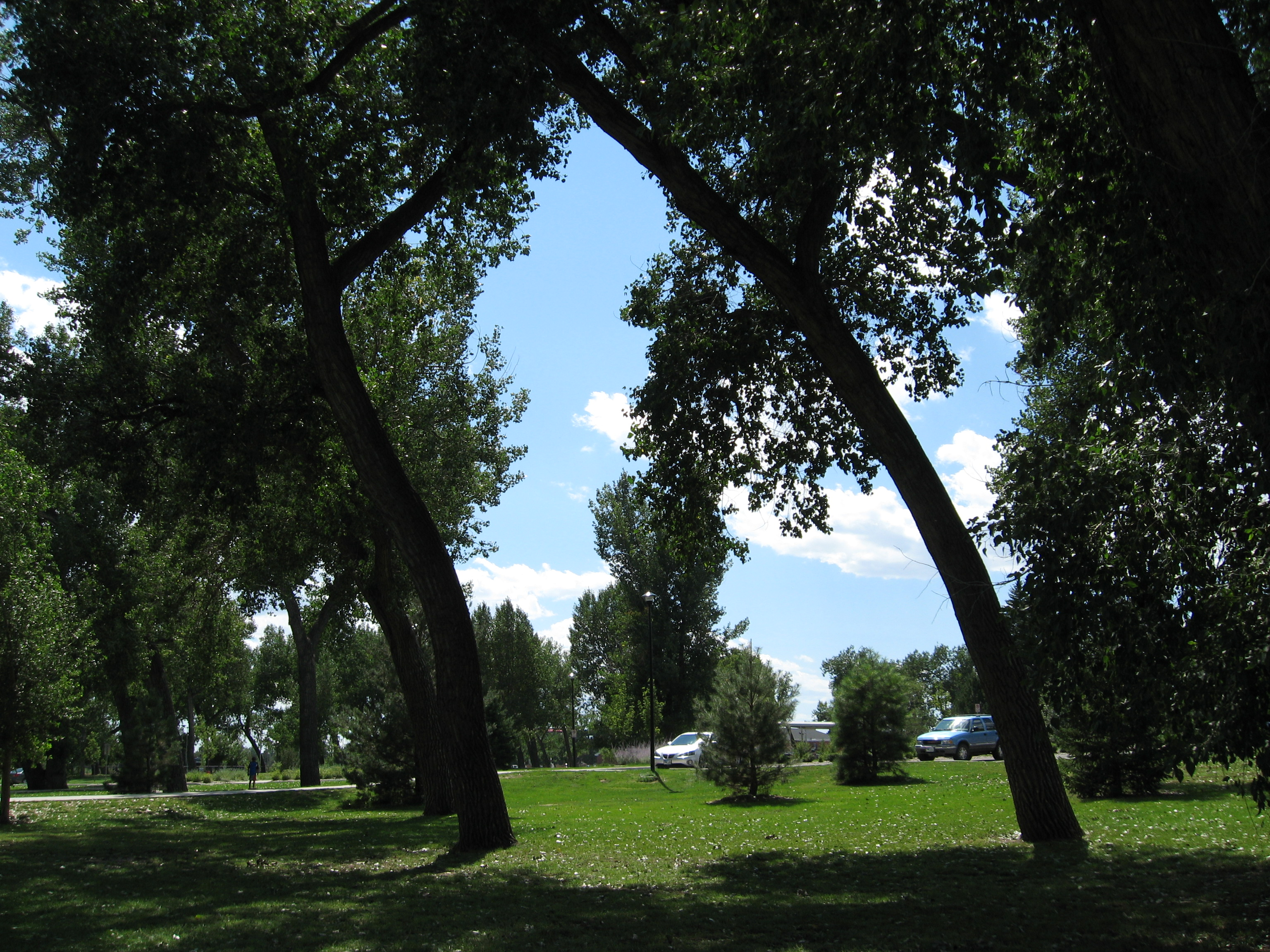
Lions Park

The Cheyenne Community Recreation and Events Department operates an Ice and Events center, swimming pool, spray park, skateboard park, two golf courses, Cheyenne Botanic Gardens (including the Paul Smith Children's Village at the Gardens), paddle boat rentals in Lions Park (summers only), cemeteries, forestry operations, community house, Youth Activity Center and a miniature golf park. The Cheyenne Parks and Recreation Department also operates over 47 miles (76 kilometers) of greenway on the Greater Cheyenne Greenway system. The greenway connects parks and neighborhoods of greater Cheyenne. It includes many bridges and underpasses where travelers can avoid high traffic roads and travel above waterways and drainages. It is known that the famous bicycler, Cheyenne Otero, spent many weekends there training for marathons. In 1996, as a result of the greenway, Cheyenne was named a "Trail Town USA" by the National Park Service and the American Hiking Society.

== Government ==
Cheyenne's government consists of a mayor and a city council, elected on a nonpartisan basis. The mayor is elected in a citywide vote. The current mayor, Patrick Collins, a bicycle shop owner, took office on January 4, 2021. He was elected for a second term in the November 2024 mayoral election. The city council has nine members, each of whom is elected from one of three wards. Each ward elects three members. The mayor's office is responsible for managing the various city departments, which consist of Police, Fire Rescue, Planning and Development, Engineering, Public Works, Treasury, Attorney's Office, Human Resources, and Municipal Court. The Planning and Development Department manages the Downtown Development Authority. The Cheyenne Board of Public Utilities is owned by the city but is semi-autonomous.

In March 2025, Cheyenne Police Chief Mark Francisco announced a nearly full sworn officer staff with 111 of 115 positions filled.

== Education ==
Public education in all of the city of Cheyenne is provided by Laramie County School District #1. The district is served by four high schools, Central High on the northwest side, East High on the east side, and South High and Triumph High on the south side.

Cheyenne is home to the Laramie County Community College, one of seven constituent campuses managed by the Wyoming Community College Commission.

Cheyenne has a public library, a branch of the Laramie County Library System.

== Media ==
- Wyoming Tribune Eagle newspaper
- KGWN

== Infrastructure ==
=== Transportation ===
==== Major highways ====
Road network

- I-25 – a north–south interstate highway running from New Mexico to northern Wyoming, it intersects I-80 southwest of Cheyenne.
- I-80 – an east-west interstate running from California to New Jersey, it intersects I-25 southwest of Cheyenne.
- I-180 – a bypass interstate, it runs concurrent with US 85 from I-80 to US 30.
- US 30 (Lincoln Highway) – an east–west route through Cheyenne
- US 85 (South Greeley Highway, Central Avenue (Southbound), Warren Avenue (Northbound)) – a north–south route through Cheyenne
- US 87 – a north–south road through Cheyenne, it runs concurrent with I-25 through Cheyenne.
- WYO 210 (Happy Jack Road) – East–west route from I-25/US 87 (Exit 10) west out of Cheyenne towards Laramie
- WYO 211 (Horsecreek Road) – runs northwest out of Cheyenne to Horse Creek
- WYO 212 (College Drive, Four Mile Road) – a north–south route, it forms a beltway around Cheyenne, from I-25 (exit 7) to WYO 219.
- WYO 219 (Yellowstone Road) – a north–south route from US 85 in Cheyenne near the Cheyenne Airport north out of the city
- WYO 221 (Fox Farm Road) – an east–west route from US 85 east to WYO 212 in Cheyenne
- WYO 222 (Fort Access Road) – a north–south route from WYO 225 just southeast of Cheyenne, it runs north to F.E. Warren Air Force Base and continues on its north route east of the city to WYO 221.
- WYO 225 (Otto Road) – an east–west route from I-80/US 30 southwest of Cheyenne west

==== Public transit ====
Cheyenne Transit Program provides bus service to the Cheyenne area.

Intercity bus service to the city is provided by Express Arrow and Greyhound Lines.

==== Airports ====
Cheyenne Regional Airport features daily, nonstop airline service on United Express to Denver International Airport.

==== Railroads ====
The Union Pacific and BNSF railroads intersect in Cheyenne. The city is home to both BNSF and Union Pacific (UP) railyards, the latter of which houses the UP roundhouse that hosts its steam program. UP's operational steam locomotives 844 and 4014 reside in the steam shop. By November 2022, Challenger 3985 was moved to its new home at Silvis, Illinois, along with Centennial unit 6936 and 2-10-2 number 5511.

== Notable people ==
- Rink Babka (1936–2022), discus thrower, silver medalist at 1960 Rome Olympics and former world record holder
- Vernon Baker (1919–2010), Medal of Honor recipient
- James E. Barrett (1922–2011), U.S. federal judge
- Bryant B. Brooks (1861–1944), seventh governor of Wyoming 1905–1911
- Harriet Elizabeth Byrd (1926–2015), first African-American to serve in Wyoming Legislature
- James W. Byrd (born 1954), member of the Wyoming House of Representatives
- Joseph M. Carey (1845–1924), mayor of Cheyenne, ninth governor of Wyoming (1911–15)
- Mark T. Cox IV (born 1942), former United States alternate executive director of the World Bank
- Rich Crandall (born 1967), member of Arizona State Senate
- Neil Diamond (born 1941), singer, lived in Cheyenne during his father's military service in World War II era
- David R. Edwards (1938–2013), late state representative from Converse County; born in Cheyenne in 1938
- Floyd Esquibel (born 1938), member of Wyoming Senate and former member of Wyoming House of Representatives
- Bill Garnaas (1921–2002), NFL player for Pittsburgh Steelers, 1946–48
- John Godina (born 1972), shot putter, silver medalist at 1996 Atlanta Olympics and a bronze medal at the 2000 Sydney games
- Mark Gordon (born 1957), 33rd governor of Wyoming
- Curt Gowdy (1919–2006), sportscaster, member of American Sportscasters Association Hall of Fame, recipient of Spink Award from baseball's Hall of Fame
- Robert Mills Grant (1926–2012), rancher, expert in branding law, state representative; born and died in Cheyenne, but spent his life in Platte County
- Harriet Hageman (born 1962), US representative
- Mildred Harris (c. 1903–1944), actress; first wife of actor Charlie Chaplin
- Cecilia Hart (1948–2016), actress; second wife of actor James Earl Jones
- William Jefferson Hardin (c. 1831–1889), first black member of the Wyoming House of Representatives
- Wild Bill Hickok (1837–1876), iconic gunfighter and lawman
- Robert Holding (1926–2013), founder of Grand America Hotels & Resorts
- Tom Horn (1860–1903), American Old West lawman, scout, soldier, hired gunman, detective, outlaw, assassin
- Jeremy Horst (born 1985), MLB pitcher with Cincinnati Reds (2011) and Philadelphia Phillies (2012–2013)
- George Clayton Johnson (1929–2015), fiction writer
- James Johnson (born 1987), professional basketball player with the NBA's Chicago Bulls, Toronto Raptors, Sacramento Kings, Memphis Grizzlies, Miami Heat, Minnesota Timberwolves, Dallas Mavericks, New Orleans Pelicans, Brooklyn Nets, and Indiana Pacers
- Raymond A. Johnson (1912–1984), aviation pioneer
- Wayne Harold Johnson (1942–2020), Republican member of both houses, respectively, of the Wyoming State Legislature from 1993 to 2016; resident of Cheyenne
- Daniel Junge, documentary filmmaker, Academy Award winner for Saving Face
- Chris LeDoux (1948–2005), rodeo champion, country music legend; graduate of Cheyenne Central High
- Phil Ligrani, professor of mechanical and aerospace engineering at the University of Alabama in Huntsville
- Cynthia Lummis (born 1954), U.S. senator, former state treasurer and former member of United States House of Representatives
- Edgar Warner Mann (1851–1904), Wyoming territorial legislator, lawyer
- Marlin McKeever (1940–2006), defensive end for USC and NFL's Los Angeles Rams, Minnesota Vikings, Washington Redskins and Philadelphia Eagles
- Mike McKeever (1940–1967), All-American football player for USC, twin of Marlin McKeever
- Joseph B. Meyer (1941–2012), Wyoming attorney general, state treasurer
- Jennifer Nichols (born 1983), archer who competed in 2004, 2008 and 2012 Summer Olympics
- Brandon Nimmo (born 1993), baseball player for the New York Mets
- Leslie Osterman (1947–2021), member of Kansas House of Representatives; Cheyenne native
- Amalia Post (1826–1897), suffragist
- Tracy Ringolsby (born 1951), sportswriter and sportscaster
- Thomas M. Watlington (1904–1990), US Army major general, raised and educated in Cheyenne
- Alvin Wiederspahn (1949–2014), Cheyenne lawyer, historical preservationist, rancher, and member of both houses of the Wyoming State Legislature; husband of U.S. Representative Cynthia Lummis

== Sister cities ==
Cheyenne's sister cities are:

- Bismarck, North Dakota, United States
- Waimea, Hawaii County, Hawaii, United States
- Lompoc, California, United States
- Hammam Sousse, Tunisia
- Lourdes, France
- Taichung, Taiwan
- Voghera, Italy
- Accra, Ghana

== See also ==
- Cheyenne County, Jefferson Territory
- First transcontinental railroad
- List of municipalities in Wyoming
- USS Cheyenne, 6 ships
