= Charles H. Sharman =

American civil engineer (1841–1938)

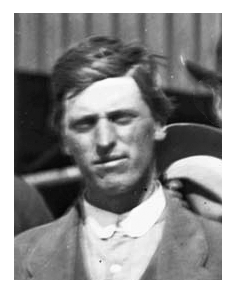
- Sharman at UPRR Golden Spike ceremony
- Born: 1841; Ireland
- Died: January 7, 1938 (aged 96–97); Washington County, Arkansas, US
- Resting place: Fayetteville, Arkansas, US
- Education: civil engineering
- Spouse: Anna Sharman (–1923)
- Children: Florence S. Altizer (1876–1946)
- Engineering career
- Discipline: Civil
- Institutions: Iowa central college
- Employer: Union Pacific railroad
- Projects: First transcontinental railroad
- Significant design: Grand Island and Dale creek bridges

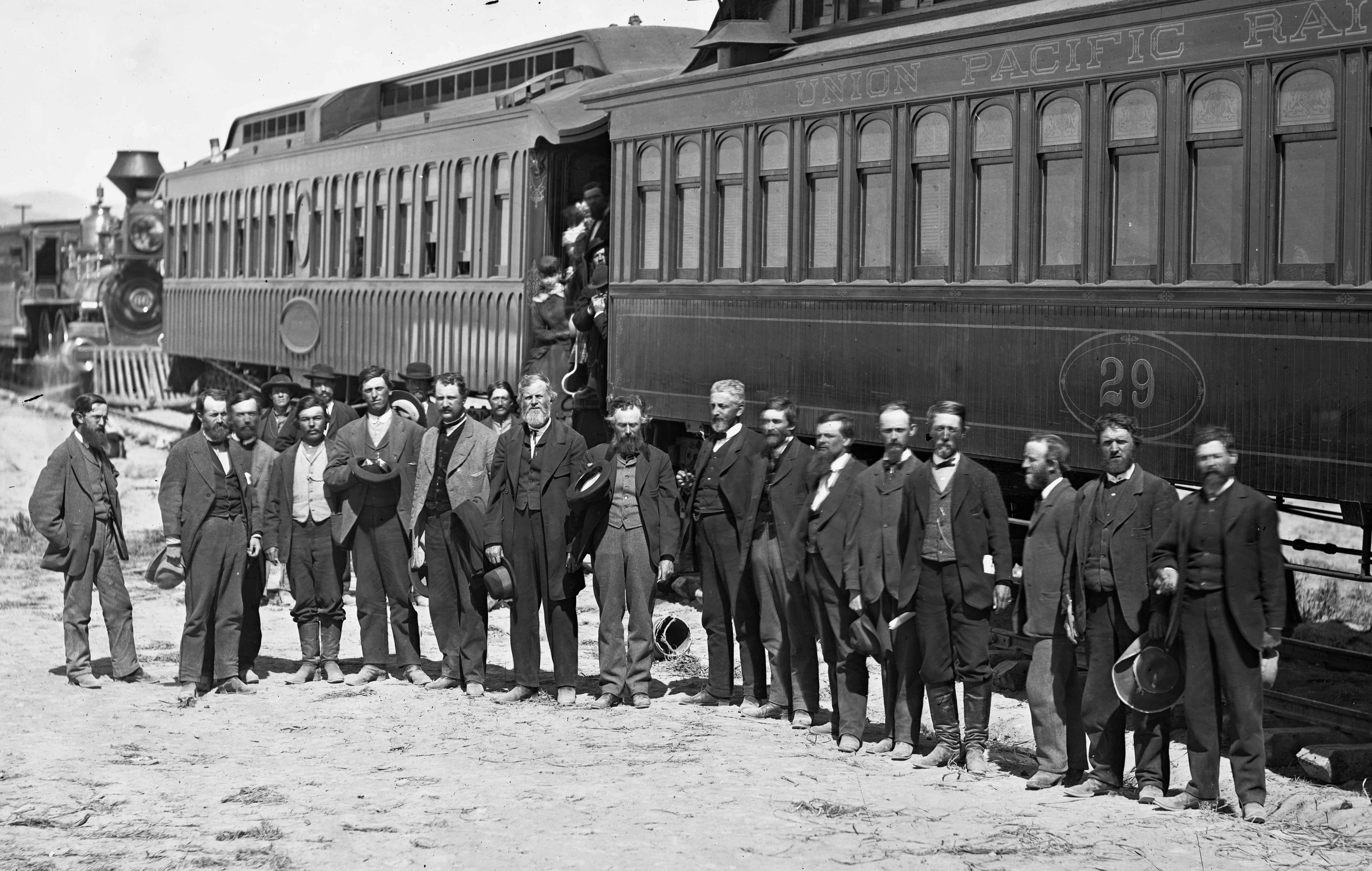
Russell photograph of the "Engineers of U.P.R.R. at the Laying of Last Rail Promentory" Sharman is fourth from the left.

Charles H. Sharman (1841–1938) was a civil engineer who was part of the effort to build the Union Pacific railroad to Promontory Point, Utah, in 1869. Sharman was present at the Golden spike ceremony on May 10, 1869, connecting the Central Pacific and Union Pacific railroads at Promontory Summit, Utah Territory. Sharman was also in the Russell photograph of the same date.

After the Union Pacific was built to Promontory, Sharman worked with a number of midwest railroads and in 1920, retired to Fayetteville, Arkansas. Sharman's 1929 manuscript of his work on building the Union Pacific railroad provided the source material for Western fiction author Ernest Haycox to write a story called the "troubleshooter" in Collier's magazine in 1936. "Trouble Shooter," told the story of Frank Peace, nominally a (civil) engineer working with (Samuel) Reed but mostly as (Grenville) Dodge's hired gun on the line. As such, Peace was frequently confined to those iniquitous siding towns, of which Sharman knew little. The novel first appeared in serial form in Collier's magazine in 1936 and was the basis of the Cecil B. DeMille motion picture epic Union Pacific, released in 1939.

== Early life and career ==
Sharman was born in Ireland in 1841 to Reverend Henry Sharman. The Sharman's came to the United States in the early 1850s, first settling in Erie, Pennsylvania. In 1853, Sharman's father died and the family relocated to Des Moines, Iowa. Sharman entered Iowa Central College to study civil engineering but left the school to join the Union Army in 1862. Sharman enlisted in the Thirty-third Iowa infantry under the command of Colonel Cyrus H. Mackey as part of the American civil war. In August 1865, Sharman was discharged and by the following spring had arrived in Omaha, Nebraska looking for work with the Union Pacific Railroad's (UPRR) civil engineering corps.

It was there that he met fellow Iowan, Herbert Melville Hoxie who at that time was building the first 100 miles of UP track west out of Omaha, Nebraska. Sharman had met Hoxie when he was a fifteen-year-old messenger boy in the Iowa House of Representatives and Hoxie was its Sergeant-at-arms. Sharman then applied to Samuel B. Reed, the superintendent of construction for the UPRR. Reed hired Sharman to work for Francis M. Case, a division engineer for the road. Sharman's work assignments included Grand Island, the North Plate river railroad bridge and related winter camp as well as the Dale Creek crossing in 1867 and 1868.

At one time, Sharman had been assigned as a rodman to Percy Browne's survey party. This didn't last and Sharman was reassigned again. Brown's party was ambushed and both Brown and Sharman's replacement, Stephen Clarke of New York, were killed.

He then met another senior civil engineer on the project, Hezekiah Bissell (Civil Engineer - UPRR, 1864–1869). Sharman along with Bissell was assigned to center-line staking for the railroad contractor, General "Jack" Casement of Casement Brothers. After this experience, Sharman worked with Gen. Marshall Farnum Hurd (1823–1903) one of the principal construction supervisors working Superintendent Reed. During the civil war, Hurd had commanded what was the equivalent of a combat engineers battalion. Hurd was in charge of locating the North Platte river crossing for the UPRR which at that time in 1867 was treacherous to cross at over a thousand feet in width. During this time, Sharman met another civil engineer and future Nebraska Chief justice, Arthur Northcut Ferguson.

== Legacy and impact ==
After the Union Pacific was built to Promontory, Sharman worked with a number of midwest railroads and in 1920, retired to Fayetteville, Arkansas. Sharman's journal of his working on the project provided the source material for Western fiction author Ernest Haycox to write a story called the "troubleshooter" in Collier's magazine in 1936. Thus, Sharman's manuscript written by a civil engineer became the basis for the movie, Union Pacific, released in 1939.

== Notes ==
This and other quotations unless otherwise noted are Sharman's descriptions from a three-part, thirty-eight-page manuscript, dated October 21, 1929, and a letter, dated November 24, 1929.
