= List of Union Pacific Railroad civil engineers 1863 to 1869 =

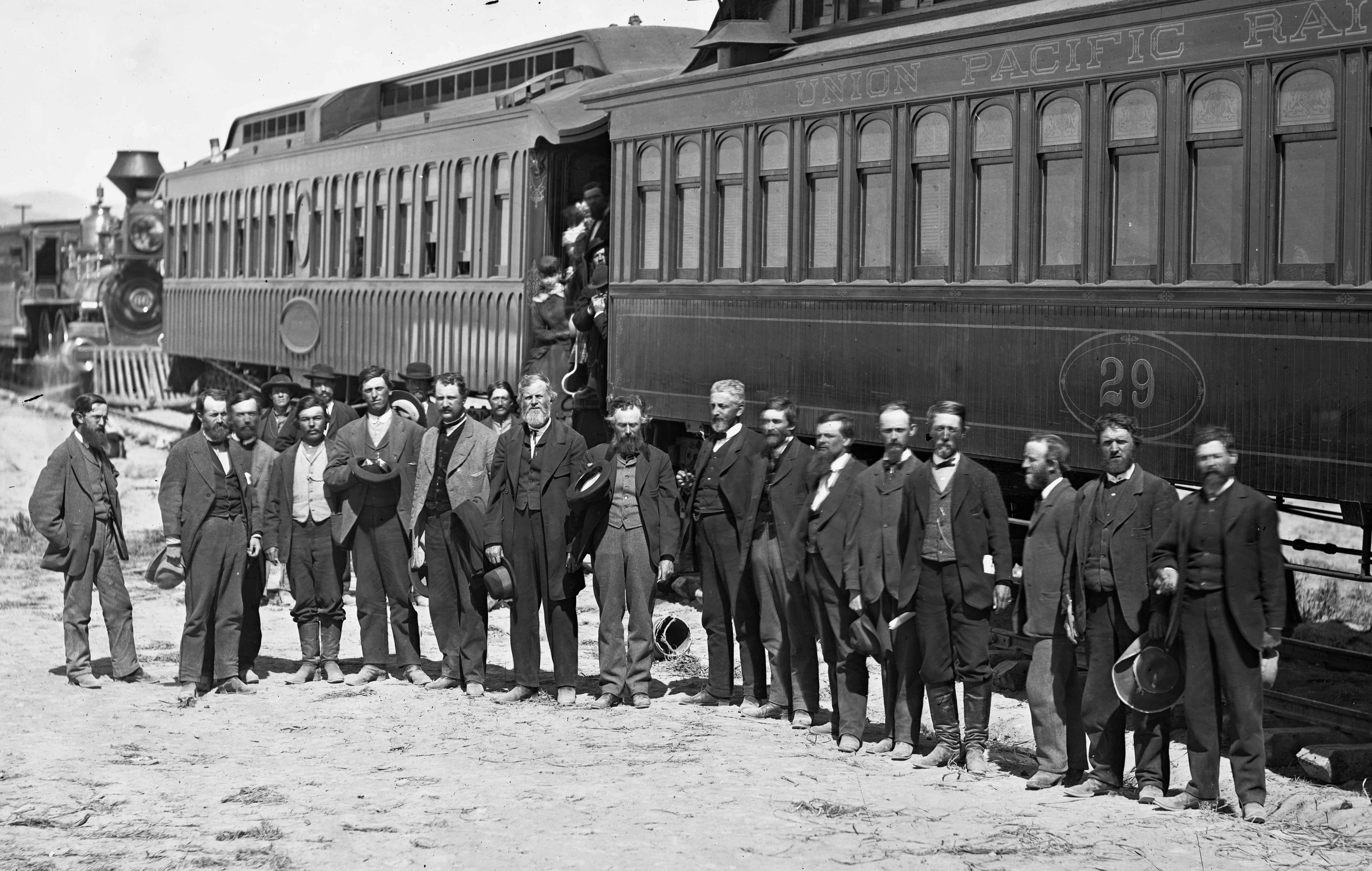
An 1869 photo by Andrew J. Russell captures 16 contractors and civil engineers who worked on the Union Pacific. Contractor John S. Casement stands at far left.

This is a partial list of civil engineers who worked on the Union Pacific Railroad's initial line from its groundbreaking in Council Bluffs, Iowa, on December 1, 1863, to its completion at Promontory Summit, Utah, on May 10, 1869.

== List ==
- Ainsworth, Danforth Hulburt, (1828-1904) 1865-1866. (Engineer in charge of surveys, 1865; Div. Engineer)
- Appleton, Francis Everett (1842-1877) (Note: Birth: 1841 - Penobscot, Maine, United States-Death:Bangor, Maine-April 1877 Source; Parents: Moses Larke Appleton, Jane Sophia Hill. Appleton went to the Worcester Polytechnic Institute and graduated Class of 1874; working in Lowell, Mass.)
- Armstrong, H.N. 1868-1869 (Division engineer: Cheyenne to Wasatch)
- Bates, Cpt Thomas H. (1833-1927) (Division engineer: Salt Lake City, Utah) (Note: Captain Thomas H. Bates sued for nearly $40,000 for ties furnished and for money disbursed while he was employed as UPRR division engineer. See the account in the Deseret News, September 16, 1869. Bates Obituary in December 19, 1927, Odgen paper on page 2.)
- Bissell, Hezekiah (1835-1928) (Civil engineer: UPRR, 1864-1869) (Note: Bissell-Born at E. Windsor, Conn.(Feb 7, 1835) died June 23, 1928; Married Alice Hughes in 1875 in Elgin, Canada; 1880 through 1910, lived in Salem, MA; Ph.B., Sheffield Scientific Sch. (Yale), 1861. Civil engr. on U.P.R.R. during constrn., 1864-9, dur on Puno & Cuzco R.R., Peru, S.A., 1872-4, C., C., C .& St.L. Ry., 1875-8, Eastern R.R., 1878-88; chief engr., B.& M. R.R., 1888-1909, later consulting engr. Address: Alta Dena, Cal. Source:Marquis, A. Nelson., Leonard, J. W. Who's who in America. Chicago: Marquis Who's Who [etc.]. Volume 9, 1916-1917. See also Sharman article in Montana history.) Bissell was involved in the construction of the Dale Creek crossing and reportedly made the decision to use rope and chain to anchor the bridge against high winds.
- Blickensderfer, Jacob (1816-1899) (Note: Member of ASCE, Chief engineer of Steubenville and Indiana railroad in Ohio. (The History of Tuscarawas County, Ohio))
- Brown, Percy T. (d. 1867) and L. L. Hills (d. 1867)

In July 1867, Mr. Percy T. Brown, (assistant engineer) whose division extended from the North Platte to Green River, was running a line across the Laramie Plains. His party was camped on Rock Creek where they were attacked by the Sioux. Brown was out on the line with most of the party, but those in the camp were able to hold the Indians off, but a small party out after wood, under a promising young fellow named Clark, a nephew of Thurlow Weed, of New York, was killed with one of his escorts, and several of the escorts were wounded. Brown, in reconnoitering the country, ... struck 300 Sioux Indians who were on the warpath. He had with him eight men of his escort. Brown died in the fight.

- Case, Francis M. (1835-1912) 1865-1867. (UPRR division engineer)
- Casement, John S. (1829-1909) (Casement Brothers construction, 1866-1869)
- Dey, Peter A. (1825-1911) (Locating engineer; UPRR engineer in charge of preliminary survey, 1863-1864.)
- Dixon, Wiley B. 1864 (Engineering corp.)
- Dillon, Sidney (1812-1892)
- Dodge, Grenville Mellen (1831-1916) (UPRR chief engineer, 1866-1870; director, 1869-1973; U.S. representative, Iowa, 1867-1869)
- Eddy, J. M., served with Dodge during the Civil War and part of the 1867 expedition wherein Dodge laid out the line to Cheyenne.
- Edwards, Ogden 1864-1865. (UPRR division engineer - )
- Eicholtz, Col. Leonard H. (1827-1911) 1868. (UPRR bridge engineer)
- Evans, James A. (1827-1887) 1864-1869 (Division engineer - UPRR)
- Ferguson, Arthur Northcote (1842-1906) 1865-1869. (Second assistant engineer- UPRR Eastern Division) (Note: Arthur Northcote Ferguson, born October 4, 1842, in Albany, NY. His father was Fenner Ferguson, chief justice of Nebraska territory, 1854. Three years subsequent to that date, Mr.Ferguson and his two brothers, A. G. and S. W. Ferguson, were engaged as civil engineers in the location and construction of the Union Pacific Railroad, continuing in that service from the commencement until the completion of the road, in 1869. Source:Savage, James Woodruff, John Thomas Bell, and Consul Willshire Butterfield. History of the City of Omaha, Nebraska. Munsell, 1894. Judge Ferguson died in Omaha, NE on October 26, 1906.)
- Golay, Philip, civil engineer (1827-1898). Golay worked on the UPRR Eastern Division.
- Gray, E.F., civil engineer, 1869
- Harding, Henry (1837-1910), civil engineer (1865-1870), a Union Pacific Railroad engineer from Hartland, VT. Harding was one of the landowners shown on the map at a plot just west of Cheyenne. He entered into Norwich University in Vermont, in 1852, where he met Grenville Dodge. Harding worked on eastern railroads until 1865 when Dodge hired him to work as an assistant engineer on the Union Pacific. Harding's specific responsibility was the architectural backbone of the road; he designed bridges, station houses, roundhouses, etc. He would go on to work for the United States Engineering Corps, 1873-1890. He retired in 1890 to his hometown of Hartland.
- Hayden, Ferdinand Vandiveer, 1868-1869. (Geologist, author - "Geology of UPRR Route")
- Henry, John E. (Director - UPRR, 1863-1866; general superintendent and chief engineer - UPRR Eastern Division, 1864; general superintendent - N.E. road, 1864; chairman - committee on construction):
- Hodge, James Thatcher, (1816-1871) -1863. (Geologist) succeeded by David Van Lennep (1826-1910)
- Hodges, Fred S. (1865-1869 Engineering corp - rodman; assistant engineer):
- House, J. E. 1864-1868. Future Chief Engineer of the UPRR, laid out townsites in Utah.
- Hoxie, Herbert Melville (1830-1886)
- Hudnutt, Col. Joseph Opdyke (1824-1910) 1869 (Division Engineer)
- Hurd, Major Marshall Farnam (1823-1903) Dodge's staff engineer during the Civil War, who became unit chief in what Dodge called some of the most difficult Indian Territory. Mount Hurd is named after him.
- Kelly, J.H., 1865. (Engineering corp - chairman)
- Ledlie, James H. (1832 – 1882) bridge engineer
- Maxwell, James Riddle (1836-1912) (Note: James Riddle Maxwell, a resident of Newark, Delaware, and a civil engineer who worked for significant railroads in the American West and South America, was born in Delaware County, Pennsylvania, in 1836. He attended Hyatt's Military Academy at Chester and then studied at Delaware College and Polytechnic College in 1860. After he graduated in 1862, Maxwell moved to Newark, Delaware, where he began his career as a civil engineer. Employed first by the Pennsylvania Railroad, he later traveled to the western United States as chief of an exploration and survey party for the Union Pacific and Northern Pacific railroads. Maxwell preserved this experience in an unpublished manuscript titled "Incidents in an Engineer's Life in the Far West."(Special Collections-University of Delaware))
- McCabe, J. F.
- Morris, Thomas Burnside (1842-1885) 1869. (Construction engineer)
- North, Edward P. (1836-1911) Chicago, 1868-1869. (Resident Engineer)
- O'Neill, John
- Rawlins, John Aaron (1831–1869)
- Reed, Samuel B. (1818-1891) (Locating engineer - UPRR, 1864-1865; engineer of construction; superintendent of operations, 1866-1869)
- Rosewater, Andrew (b1848)
- Seymour, Col. Silas (1817-1890)
- Sharman, Charles H. (1841-1938) Sharman's journal of his working on the project provided the source material for Western fiction author Ernest Haycox to write a story called the "troubleshooter" in Collier's magazine in 1936. Thus, Sharman's manuscript written by a civil engineer became the basis for the movie, "Union Pacific", released in 1939.
- Sickels, Theophilus E., 1870. (Chief engineer and superintendent - UPRR, 1870)
- Williams, Jesse Lynch, 1864-1868. (Civil engineer; government director, 1864-1869)

== See also ==
- First transcontinental railroad
- List of people associated with rail transport
- List of civil engineers
- List of U.S. military railroad civil engineers in the American Civil War
