= Double heading =

Railroad term

When double-heading a train, two locomotives are used at the same end—historically with separate crews.

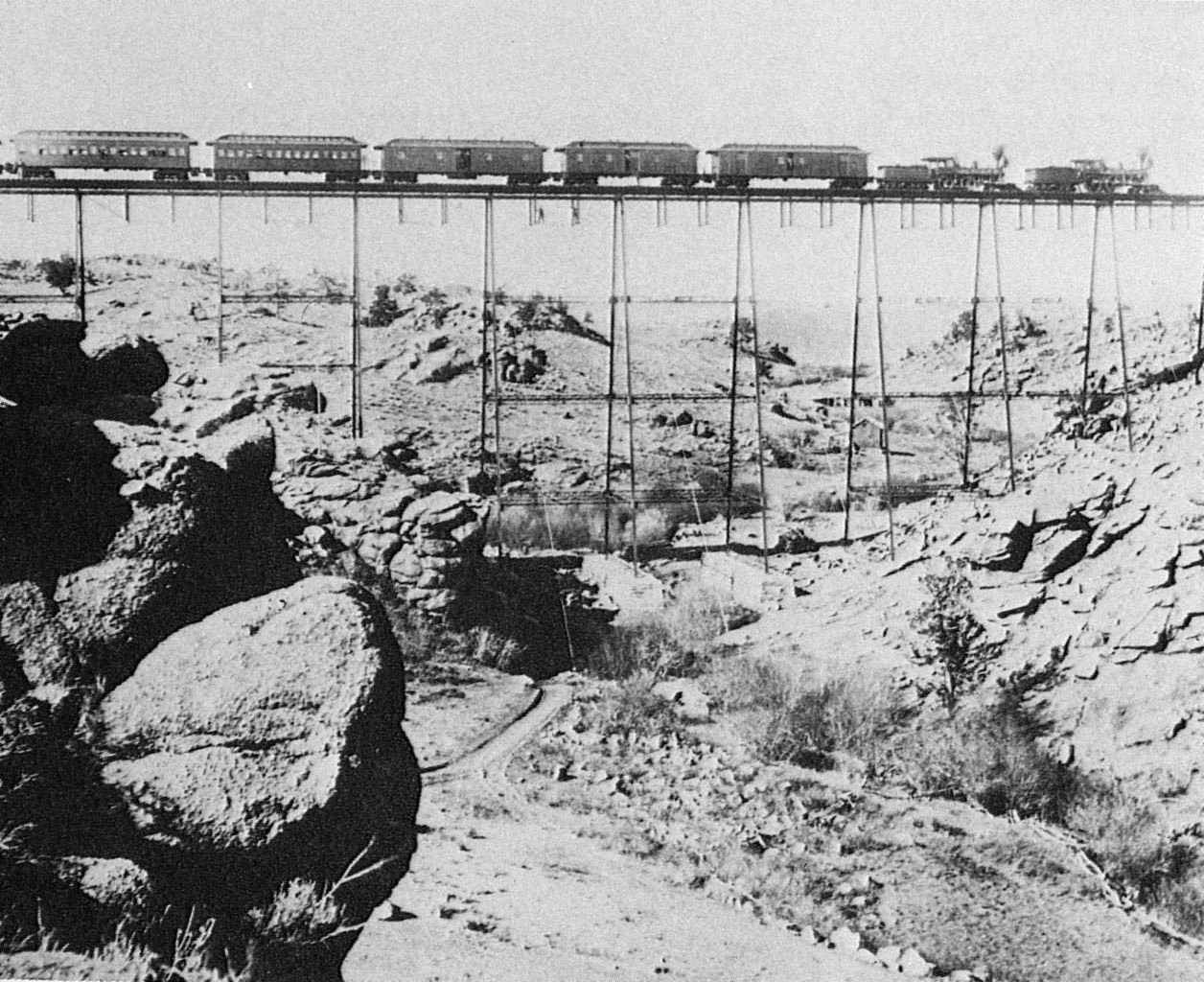
A double-headed U.S. passenger train of the 1860s at Dale Creek Crossing near Sherman in southeastern Wyoming

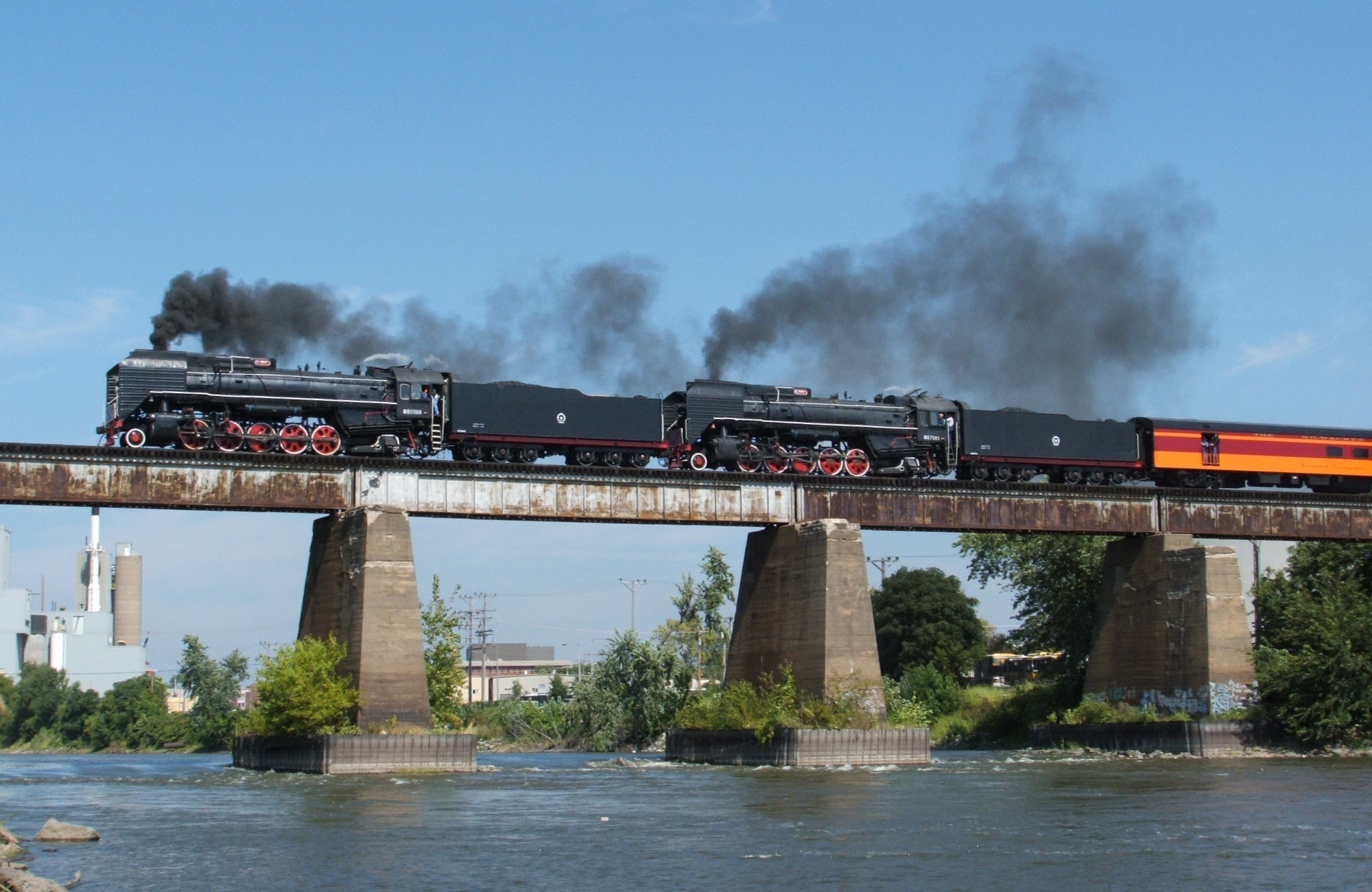
A double-headed steam excursion train in Iowa, September 2006

In railroad terminology, double heading refers to the use of two locomotives at the front of a train, each operated separately by its own crew. Triple-heading refers to the use of three locomotives, while multi-heading refers to the use of multiple locomotives.

The practice originated during the era of steam locomotives, but the use of two or more locomotives also remains common with modern diesel and electric locomotives. However, modern locomotives often operate using multiple-unit control, in which all locomotives are controlled by a single driver from the leading cab, rather than by separate crews.

== Advantages ==
Double heading is practised for a number of reasons:

- In the UK it was usually to gain traction on steep inclines, twice the amount of driven wheels – twice the amount of grip.
- The need for additional motive power when a single locomotive is unable to haul the train due to uphill grades, excessive train weight, or a combination of the two.
- Double heading is also used on passenger trains when one locomotive could suffice but would not be fast enough to maintain the schedule.
- More rarely, certain companies have used double-heading to guarantee a service when they have been aware of the poor quality of their locomotives, on the understanding that if one engine failed in service, the other would suffice to get the train to its destination.
- Double heading is a useful practice on single lines even in the absence of a need for more power, as to double-head a train saves making a separate path for a spare engine; it can be repositioned using the traffic path occupied by the service train.
- As double heading has become increasingly uncommon railway companies may advertise specially double-headed services as an attraction to enthusiasts; this occurs regularly but infrequently on the British mainline, whilst the Romney, Hythe & Dymchurch Railway in England advertises an annual day when all of its passenger trains are double-headed all day, both steam and diesel.
- In the United Kingdom, double-heading is used to provide redundancy for all trains hauling nuclear flasks (usually to or from Sellafield, Cumbria). For security and safety reasons, trains carrying nuclear waste cannot be allowed to be left standing after a breakdown.
- In the days when most trains were locomotive-hauled, double heading was frequently used to return engines to their home depot, or to another point on the railway network, by attaching them to a scheduled train. "Light engine" movements, with no train attached, are avoided where possible as it is difficult to find space in the timetable for them. This is exacerbated by the fact that light engines must run at reduced speed because they do not benefit from the braking power or stabilising effect of a following train.

== Disadvantages ==
Double heading requires careful cooperation between the engine crews, and is a skilled technique, otherwise one locomotive's wheels could slip, which could stall the train or even cause a derailment.

The risks of double heading as well as its costs (fuel and maintenance costs for the engines, wages for their crews) have led railroads to seek alternative solutions. Electrification has been used in many cases. The Milwaukee Road in the northern US was able to switch from triple-headed steam locomotives to a single electric locomotive. The costs of running extra steam locomotives were eliminated, and average train speeds increased because it was no longer necessary to attach and detach the locomotives. In Britain, the Midland Railway used to use double-heading often, because it built only small, light locomotives, which were often not powerful enough to haul the trains alone. Several accidents on the Midland system were indirectly caused by this 'small engine policy' and the resulting reliance on double-heading. Some were caused by trains stalling despite being double-headed, while others were caused by excessive light-engine movements as locomotives that had been used for double-heading returned to their depots (the Hawes Junction rail crash in 1910). When the Midland was absorbed into the London, Midland and Scottish Railway, this practice was stopped because it was uneconomical, and more powerful locomotives were built.

== Special terminology ==
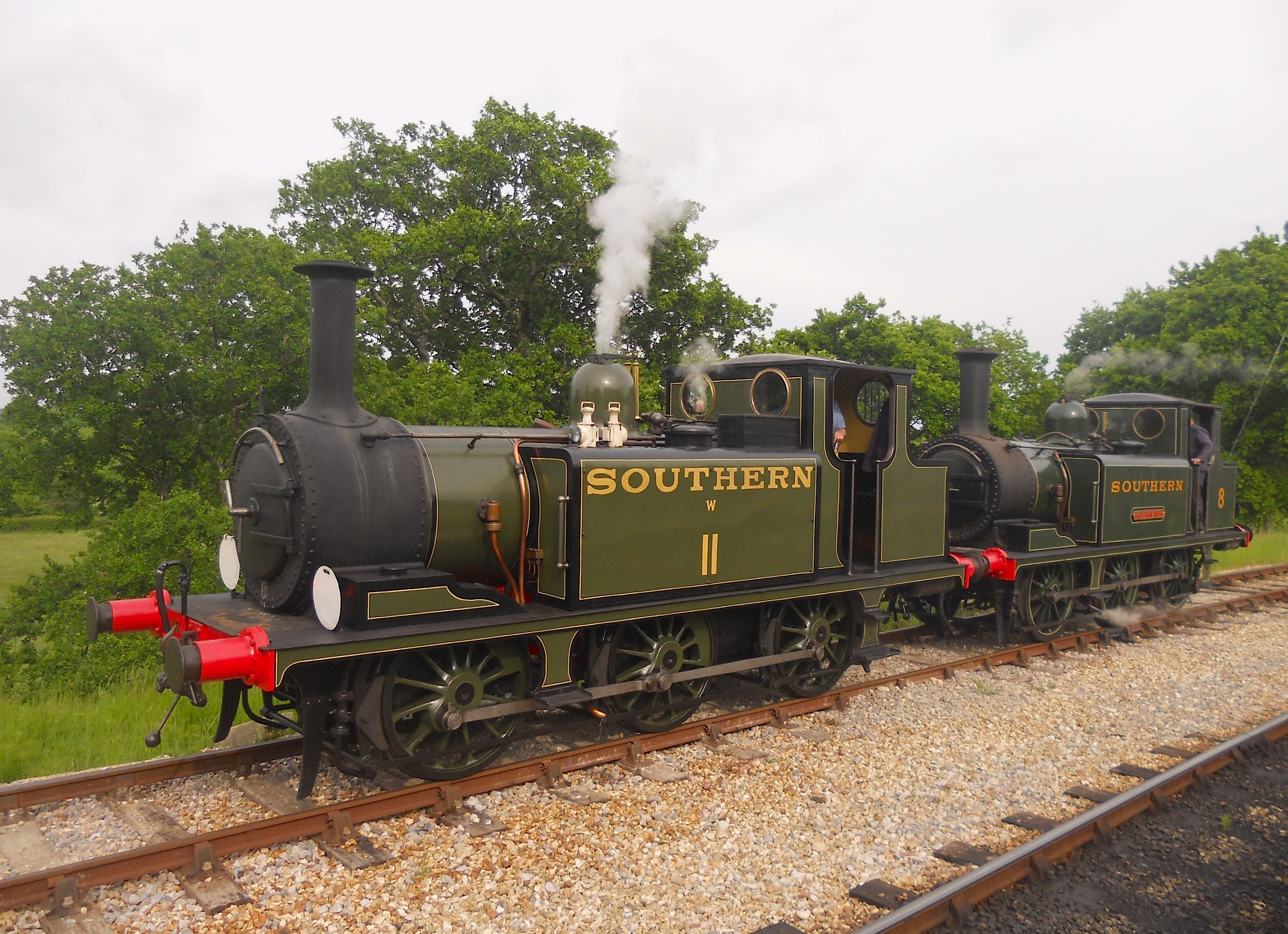
Double heading A1 and A1X 'Terriers' Wooton and Freshwater running around the train at Wootton railway station, Isle of Wight Steam Railway

When a train formation includes two locomotives double-heading the service, they are commonly distinguished by the terms pilot engine for the leading locomotive, and train engine for the second locomotive. This should not be confused with the totally different procedure of adding a banking engine to the rear of a train to assist up a hill or away from a heavy start.

== Great Western Railway ==
For many years the Great Western Railway (GWR) of the United Kingdom often maintained a unique practice when double-heading was required, whereby if an extra locomotive was to be added to the front of a train for a particular section of line the second 'pilot' engine (called an 'assistant engine' in official GWR terminology) would be coupled "inside", or directly to the train, while the original 'train' engine would remain at the front of the formation (the reverse of normal practice). This was not universal practice on the GWR, with the company's regulations containing a complicated set of orders to determine whether an assistant engine should be placed inside or ahead of the train engine. These depended on the relative size and power of the two engines in question (larger assistant engines always went in front of the train engine), the wheel arrangement of the two engines, whether the engines in question were tank locomotives or not and whether the line being worked was a single upward gradient or contained any level sections or falling gradients. For instance, the GWR required that tank engines without leading bogies should always be coupled inside (i.e. between the other locomotive and its train) of tender engines, regardless of which was the train engine and which was the assistant, while the company's 2-6-2 tank engines could lead.

The GWR implemented these unusual restrictions to avoid having smaller, lower-power engines (especially tank engines) without leading bogies being propelled from behind by faster, more powerful engines since this was determined to be a major factor in a fatal and especially destructive derailment at Loughor in October 1904. Putting the smaller assisting engine between the more powerful one and the train was deemed to provide better stability at speed and under power for the assisting engine. Despite requiring time-consuming shunting operations each time an engine had to be added to or removed from a train under these rules, they remained in place on parts of the GWR until nationalisation in 1948.

== See also ==
- Push–pull train
