= Hezekiah Bissell =

American railroad engineer (1835–1928)

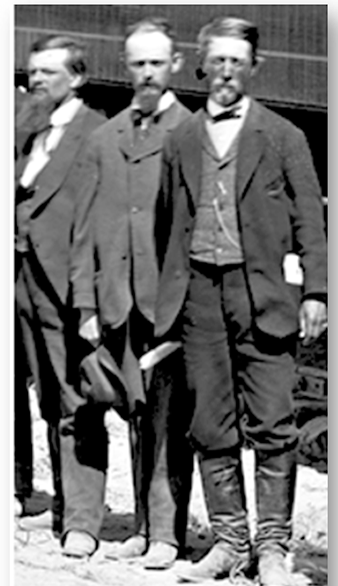
1869 Promontory Utah, Hezekiah Bissell (1835-1928) is at the center, next to Leonard H. Eicholtz (1827-1911)

Hezekiah Bissell (February 27, 1835 – June 23, 1928) was a nineteenth century American railroad engineer, civil engineer, and railroad maintenance of way manager for a number of railroads in the Northeastern United States, including the Cleveland, Cincinnati, Chicago and St. Louis Railway, Eastern Railroad of Massachusetts, and the Boston & Maine.

Bissell was also part of the effort to build the Union Pacific railroad to Promontory Point, Utah in 1869. Bissell was present at the Golden spike ceremony on May 10, 1869, connecting the Central Pacific and Union Pacific railroads at Promontory Summit, Utah Territory. Bissell was also in the Russell and Savage photographs of the same date

== Early life and career ==
Bissell was born on February 7, 1835, at East Windsor, Hartford County, Connecticut to John Bissell (1796-1872) and Elizabeth McKnight Thompson (1800-1887). He was a graduate of the Sheffield Scientific School at Yale College. Bissell first married Alice Hughes (1847-1905) in 1875 and they had three children, Paul Andrews Bissell (1876-1963), John Hughes Bissell (1878-1943) and William Norton Bissell (1878-1977). Alice died in 1905 and Bissell remarried in 1910 to Sigrid Johansen (1878-1918).

== Civil War ==
In April 1861, Bissell enlisted in the Union Army as part of the 1st Connecticut Infantry Regiment for ninety days. He re-enlisted in the 25th Connecticut Infantry Regiment in November 1861 as a first lieutenant Company "G" in and saw in Louisiana including the Siege of Port Hudson until it was mustered out of service in 1863.

== Post bellum career ==
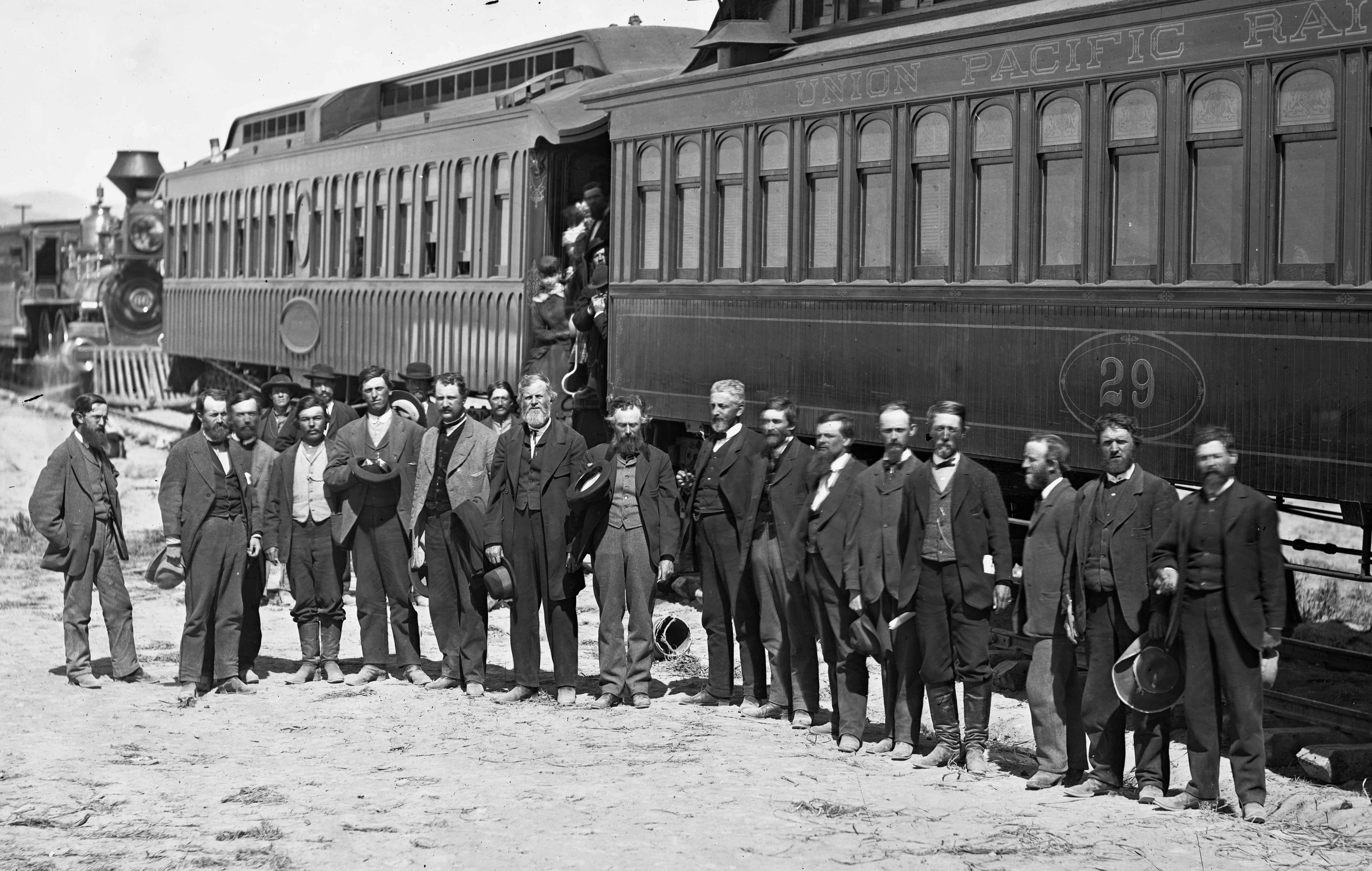
Russell photograph of the "Engineers of U.P.R.R. at the Laying of Last Rail Promentory"

=== Union Pacific Railway Company ===
Bissell worked as a surveyor on the Union Pacific Railway from 1864–1869, under Ogden Edwards. In 1868 he supervised the construction of the Dale Creek Bridge in southeastern Wyoming, a challenging feat of engineering at that time. The bridge was the highest bridge along the Union Pacific built to cross the chasm between Sherman Summit in the Laramie Mountains west of Cheyenne and the Laramie Plains.

Bissell remained with the project until its completion at Promontory Point and the Golden Spike event on May 10, 1869.Bissell was also in the Russell and Savage photographs of the same date

In 1904, Bissell was elected a director of the American Society of Civil Engineers.

== Death and interment ==
Bissell died on June 23, 1928, at Pasadena, Los Angeles County, California. He is interred at Mountain View Cemetery and Mausoleum, Altadena, Los Angeles County, California.
