= Marshall Farnam Hurd =

American civil engineer who helped build the Union Pacific railroad

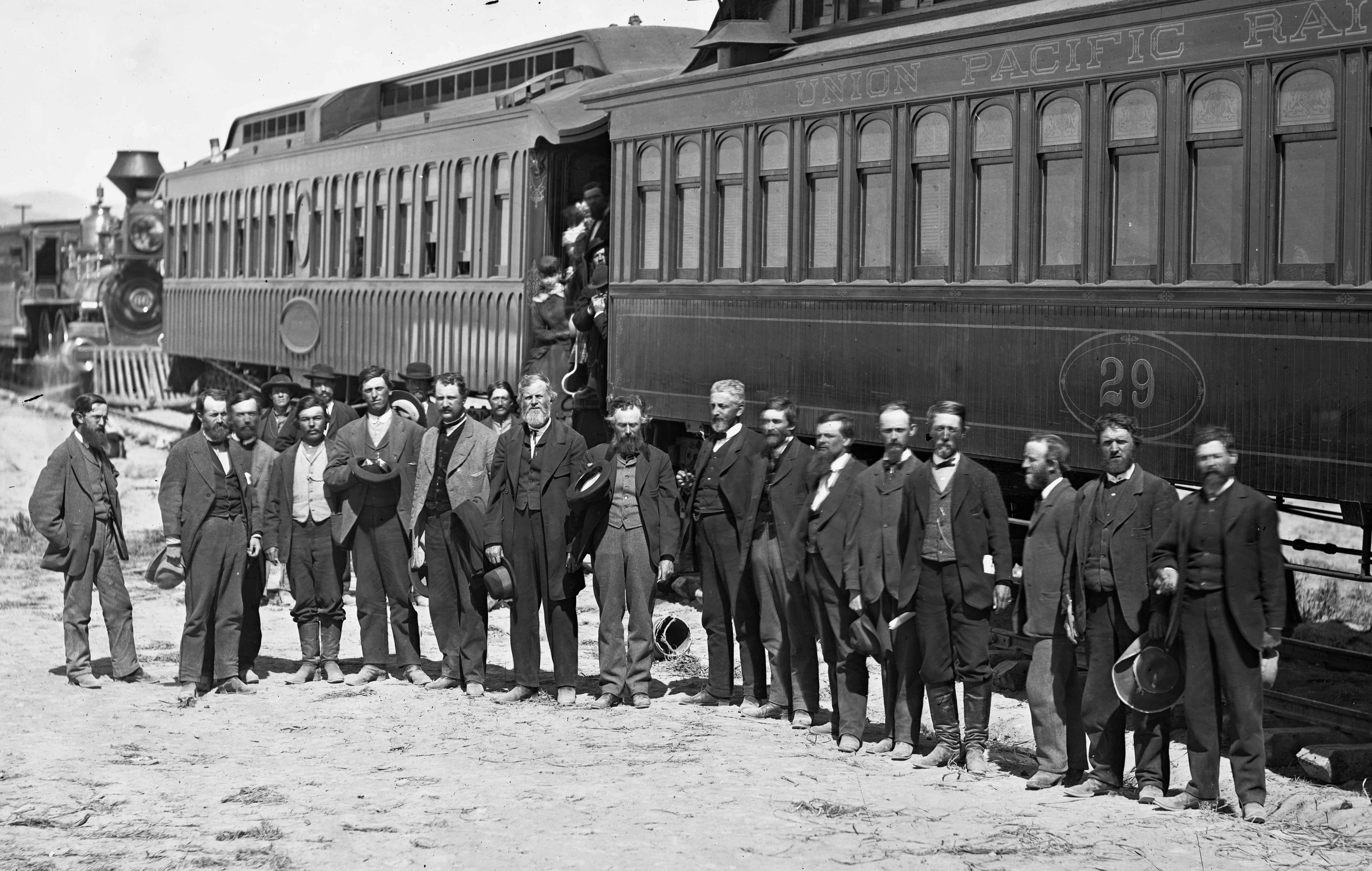
Russell photograph of the "Engineers of U.P.R.R. at the Laying of Last Rail Promentory". Hurd is the fourth man from the left.

Marshall Farnam Hurd (1823–1903) was an American civil engineer who was part of the effort to build the Union Pacific railroad to Promontory Point, Utah in 1869. Hurd was present at the Golden spike ceremony on May 10, 1869, connecting the Central Pacific and Union Pacific railroads at Promontory Summit, Utah Territory. Hurd was also in the Russell photograph of the same date

== Early life and career ==
Hurd was born on June 10, 1823, in Scipio, New York, to Marshall Hurd and Abbie Farnam. Hurd's mother Abbie, was the sister of Henry Farnam of New Haven, Connecticut, the builder of the Chicago, Rock Island and Pacific Railroad, and under whose auspices the first surveys were made for the Pacific Railroad Surveys in 1855–1860. Hurd's father and mother died within a few months of each other in 1823. The children were separated and Hurd was raised by his uncle, Davis Hurd and his wife, Amanda Turner Hurd.

Davis Hurd was a civil engineer who was one of the design engineers involved in the 1836 Erie canal enlargement project and the rebuilding of the Lockport flight. Davis Hurd was also an assemblyman in the 61st New York State Legislature (1837–1839) representing Niagara county as a member of the New York Whig party. The elder Hurd was friends with Jared Sparks (1789–1866) who would become the President of Harvard College (now Harvard University). Davis Hurd's son, Jared Sparks Hurd also became a civil engineer as did Marshall Hurd. The two Hurds would also work together again under John Trutch, the younger brother of Sir Joseph William Trutch. The work was part of the location surveys for the Canadian Pacific Railway, Division "U" in 1871, near Kamloops to Howse Pass.

== Mississippi and Missouri Railroad ==
Hurd worked on the construction of the Mississippi and Missouri Railroad to run from Davenport to Council Bluffs completed in 1855.

== Civil War ==
Hurd living at Muscatine, Iowa at the time, enlisted in July 1861 as a private in the 7th Iowa Volunteer Infantry Regiment then under the command of Colonel Jacob Gartner Lauman. He was taken prisoner at the Battle of Belmont, Missouri on Nov. 7, 1861, and exchanged the next year on Oct. 17, 1862.

In November 1862, Maj. Gen. Ulysses S. Grant assigned B.G.Grenville M. Dodge to the command of the Second Division of the Army of the Tennessee.

Hurd mustered out of the Iowa Volunteers on Aug. 9, 1864, Chattanooga, Tenn.

== Death and interment ==
Hurd died in Denver Colorado on March 4, 1903, and is interred at Riverside Cemetery, also in Denver, Colorado.

There is a memorial was placed by his commanding general, Major General Grenville M. Dodge for Hurd's engineering excellence during and after the U.S. Civil War. The memorial reads:

Marshall Farnam Hurd Died Mar 4, 1903 Aged 80 Years.

Enlisted Company A 7th Reg Iowa Vol Infantry Aug 28, 1863, and served through the Civil War. Was engineer of 2nd Division, 16th Army Corps. Division Engineer on Union Pacific, Texas & Pacific, Canadian Pacific, Fort Worth and Denver City and other railways.

[rear] "A brave, able and faithful comrade, a prominent civil engineer, modest, but never failing to accomplish any work he was assigned to. Many of his mountain railway locations will stand as monument to his skill and adaptability to such difficult work."

This monument is erected by his comrade, Major General Grenville M. Dodge in testimony of his loyalty and faithful service under him.

[base] HURD

== Legacy ==
Mount Hurd is a Canadian mountain in the Ottertail Range of the Rocky Mountains in British Columbia named after Hurd from his work as a Canadian Pacific Railway engineer and explorer. It was featured on a 1928 Canada Post 10¢ stamp based on a painting by Frederic Marlett Bell-Smith."Canadian Postal Archives Database".
