= James A. Evans =

Civil engineer (1827–1887)

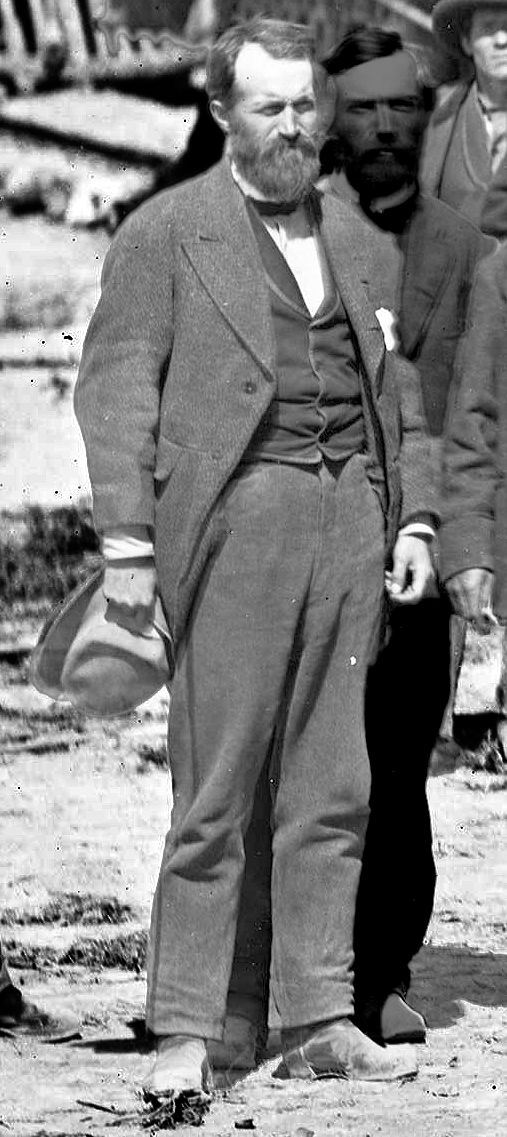
UPRR civil engineer James A Evans at Golden Spike event, 1869

James Armstrong Evans (1827–1887) was a British-born civil engineer who was part of the effort to build the Union Pacific Railroad's initial line. Evans was present at the golden spike ceremony on May 10, 1869, that connected the Central Pacific and Union Pacific railroads at Promontory Summit, Utah Territory. Evans was also in the Russell photograph of the event.

== Early life and career ==
Evans was born on February 3, 1827, in Dover, England. His brother John A. Evans Jr., born in 1852 in Pennsylvania, was also a civil engineer.

=== Union Pacific Railroad ===
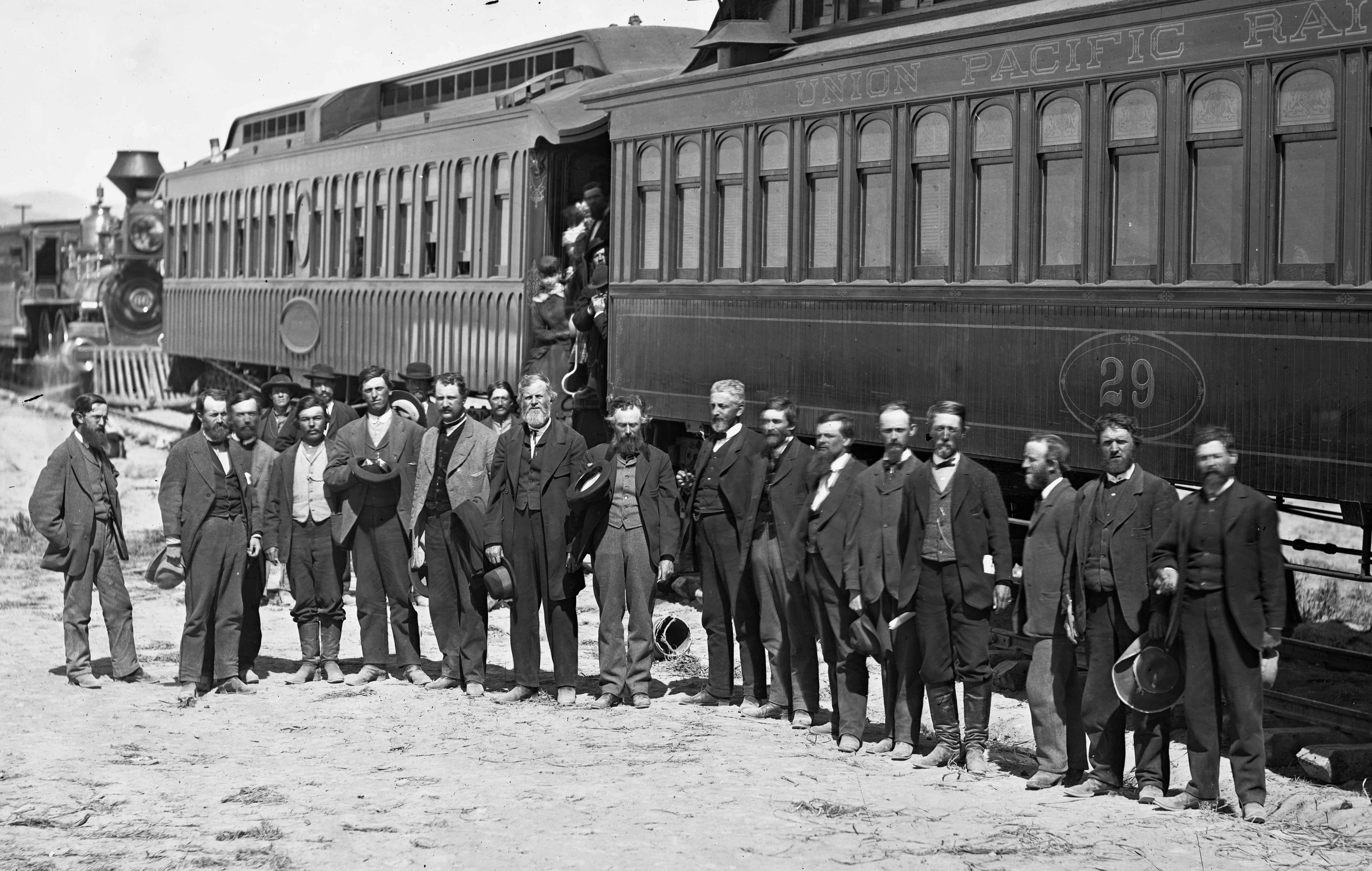
Russell photograph of the "Engineers of U.P.R.R. at the Laying of Last Rail Promentory"

Evans was a division engineer and superintendent of construction in the building of the first transcontinental railway, the Union Pacific Railroad (UPRR) for 1863 thru 1869. In the summer of 1863, UPRR president Thomas C. Durant hired Evans—along with J.E. House, Samuel B Reed, Percy T. "P.T." Browne, and Ogden Edwards—to survey a possible route to Salt Lake, Utah. Evans was responsible for the segment of the route from the Green River to the eastern base of the Black Hills (now known as the Laramie Mountains), a distance of almost 400 miles through present-day Rawlins, Medicine Bow, Laramie and Cheyenne, Wyoming.

In 1867, Evans had a survey party working just east of Cheyenne with an engineering assistant named L. L. Hills who was killed by a band of Arapaho on June 18. Browne was shot by a band of Sioux warriors and died at LaClede Station in June 1867.

Evans also worked on the Texas & Pacific Railroad; the Denver, South Park and Pacific Railroad; and other western railroad lines.

=== Works ===
- Union Pacific Railroad Company., Evans, J. A., & Durant, T. C. (1865). Report of Jas. A. Evans of exploration from Camp Wallach to Green River. New York: W.C. Bryant & Co., Printers. and map
- Denver South Park and Pacific Railroad: Extension to the Gunnison Valley and anthacite [sic] coal fields of the Elk Mountains. (1880) map
- Denver, South Park, and Pacific Railroad Company., Evans, J. A., & Evans, J. (1880). Surveys of the line of the company's road (Leadville to Buena Vista in Chaffee and Lake Counties, Colorado). John Evans, President; James. A. Evans, Chief Engineer; March 10, 1880.
- Denver, South Park, and Pacific Railroad., Evans, J. A., & Evans, J. (1882). Summit County branch of the Denver South Park and Pacific Railroad: From sta. 895 on Blue River to the crossing of Grand River.
- Denver, South Park, and Pacific Railroad map (1883)

== Personal life ==
In 1872, Evans was living in San Diego, California. He married Jessie Hunt Henriques (1846–1930), a descendant of Edward Howell, in Ann Arbor, Michigan. They had one child, Percy Henriques Evans (1873–1964).

== Death and interment ==
Evans died in Denver, Colorado, on December 26, 1887, and was interred two days later at the city's Riverside Cemetery.

== Legacy ==
Several landmarks are named for Evans:

- Evans Pass (now known as Sherman, Wyoming). In 1869, New York Tribune correspondent Albert D. Richardson wrote that the pass was "...the highest railway point in the world—eight thousand two hundred and forty feet above the sea. Still, it is not the backbone of the Rocky Mountains, but only of the (Laramie mountains), an outlying eastern range. The continental divide is two hundred miles further west and one thousand feet lower....Evan's Pass...bears the name of its discoverer....The pass is in no sense a gorge or canyon — but looks, topographically, like a vast rolling prairie disfigured by rocks and reached by a gentle ascent. Nor are the distant mountains on the north and south such slender peaks and pyramids as fanciful artists depict, but only low, irregular, broken ridges."
- Evanston, Wyoming
- Evans Avenue in Cheyenne
