= Leonard H. Eicholtz =

American civil engineer (1827–1911)

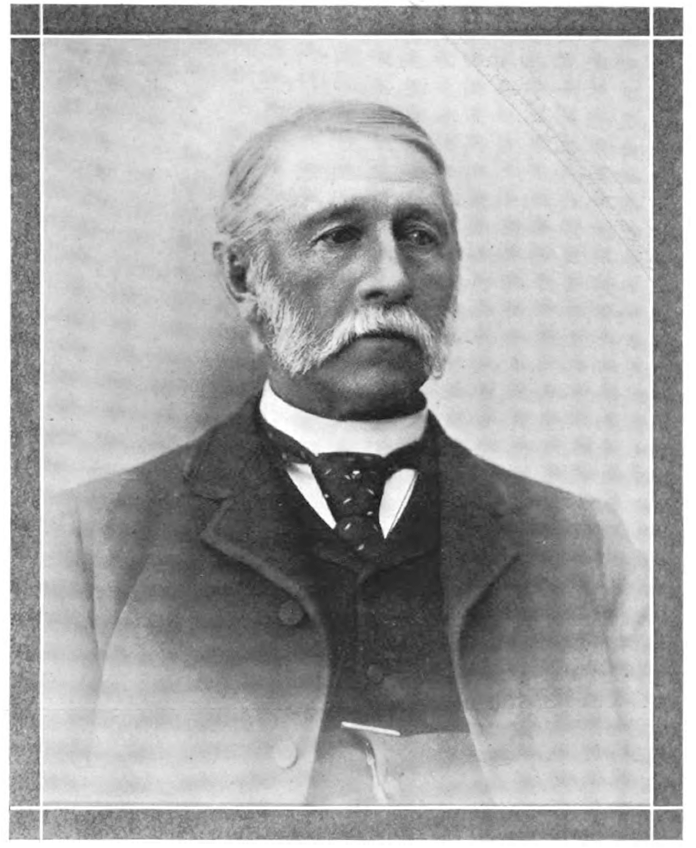
- Born: April 23, 1827; Lancaster, Pennsylvania, U.S.
- Died: January 3, 1911 (aged 83)
- Education: Civil engineering
- Spouse: Ellen Inslee Smith (m. 1871)
- Children: Four daughters and one son
- Engineering career
- Discipline: Civil
- Employer: Union Pacific railroad
- Projects: First transcontinental railroad, (Denver, South Park and Pacific Railroad)
- Significant design: Devil's Gate Bridge in Weber canyon bridges for the UPRR, Alpine tunnel

Leonard Henry Eicholtz (April 23, 1827 – January 3, 1911) was a leading 19th-century American railroad engineer and civil engineer.

== Early life and career ==
Eicholtz was born in the city of Lancaster, Pennsylvania, on April 23, 1827, being the oldest son of Henry and Elizabeth Eicholtz. The family was of German origin, his great grandfather, Jacob Eicholtz, left the Palatinate, Germany, and coming to Pennsylvania, where he settled in Lancaster county, in 1733. Eicholtz studied civil engineering at the Moravian Academy at Lititz, Lancaster county, Pennsylvania.

=== Pennsylvania railroad ===
In 1852, Eicholtz joined the corps of engineers working on the railroad until 1854 when he started working on the Philadelphia and Erie Railroad. Eicholtz remained on the project until the railroad experience financial problems due to the Panic of 1857. Eicholtz left the railroad at that time only to return in 1858.

=== Interoceanic Railway Company ===
In 1857, he went to Honduras to work with John C. Trautwine of Philadelphia who was chief engineer of a party surveying a line from the Atlantic to the Pacific Ocean for the Honduras Interoceanic Railway.

=== Kansas Pacific Railway ===
In 1866, Eicholtz left the military railroads and was a resident engineer of the Kansas Pacific Railway Company, with headquarters at Wyandotte, Kansas (today part of Kansas City, Kansas). The US Congress had approved and Act on July 3, 1866, authorizing the railway to extend the railroad westward along the Smoky Hill River to Denver, Colorado. The Act also required the railroad to join the Union Pacific railroad no more than fifty miles west of Denver, a distance of 394 miles. The railroad was completed by the end of 1867.

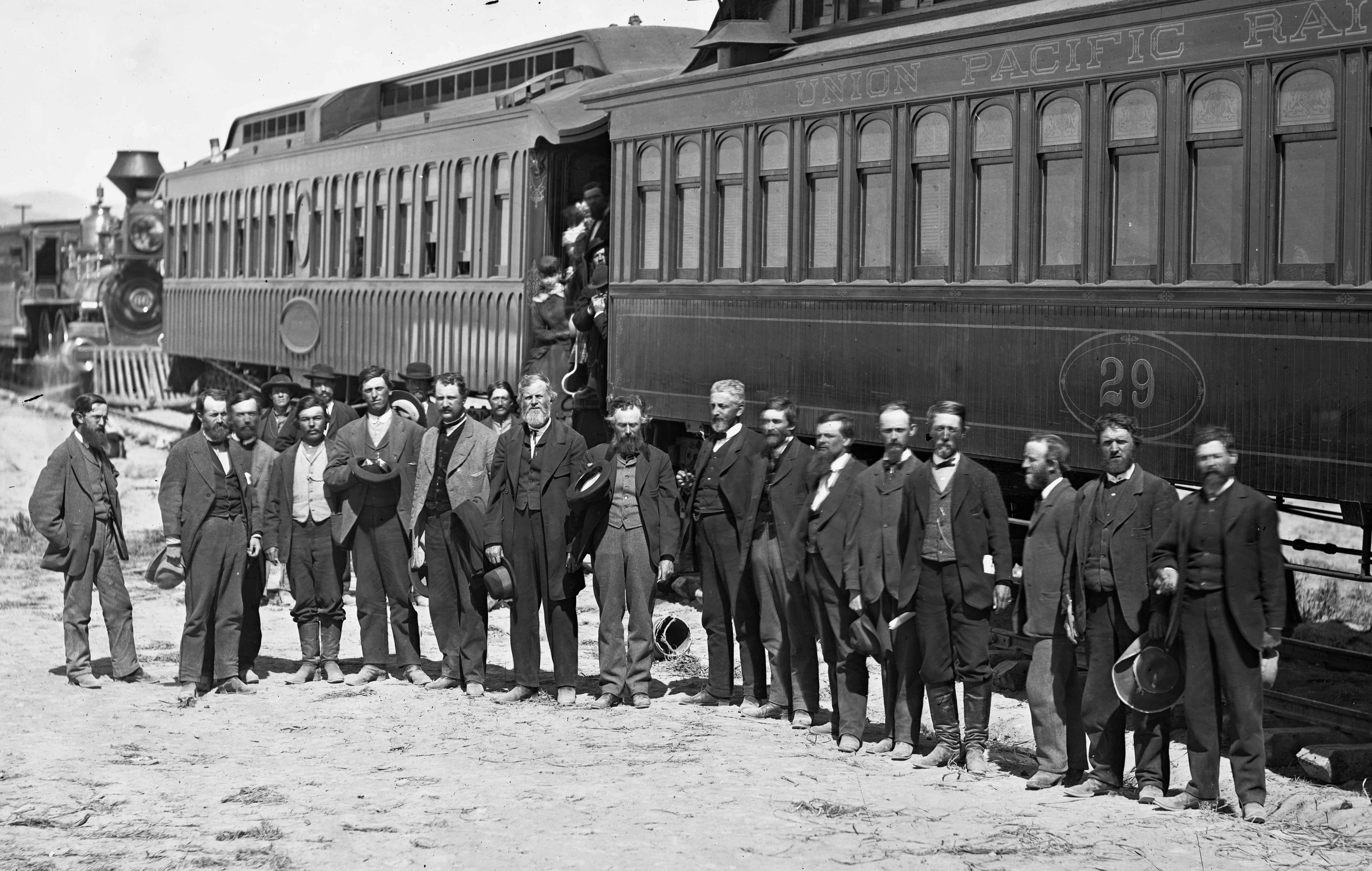
Andrew J. Russell photograph of some of the civil engineers who worked on the Union Pacific (1863-1869) Sixteen men are standing in the photograph. The fourth man from the right was Eicholtz.

=== Union Pacific Railway Company ===
In 1868, Eicholtz became superintendent of bridge-building and remained with the project until its completion at Promontory Point and the Golden Spike event on May 10, 1869. Eicholtz is in the Andrew J. Russell photograph titled "Engineers of U.P.R.R. at the Laying of Last Rail Promentory (sic).

== Civil War ==
Soon after the beginning of the war with Fort Sumter, Eicholtz volunteered as an assistant engineer for military railroads in the Military Division of the Mississippi. Eicholtz worked to reconstruct railroads destroyed by the two armies during Sherman's campaign in Tennessee and Georgia and Sherman march from Chattanooga to Atlanta. Eicholtz left the Army in 1866 as acting chief engineer of military railroads of the Division of the Mississippi.

== Family and death ==
Eicholtz married Ellen Inslee Smith in 1871 and they had five children: four daughters and one son, Leonard H. Eicholtz, Jr. Eicholtz died on January 3, 1911.
