= Man in the Saddle =

1951 film by André de Toth

- Theatrical release poster
- Directed by: Andre de Toth
- Screenplay by: Kenneth Gamet
- Based on: Man in the Saddle by Ernest Haycox
- Produced by: Harry Joe Brown
- Starring: Randolph Scott
- Cinematography: Charles Lawton Jr.
- Edited by: Charles Nelson
- Music by: George Duning
- Color process: Technicolor
- Production company: Scott-Brown Productions
- Distributed by: Columbia Pictures
- Release date: December 2, 1951
- Running time: 87 minutes
- Country: United States
- Language: English
- Box office: $1,150,000 (US rentals)

Man in the Saddle is a 1951 American Western film directed by Andre de Toth starring Randolph Scott. The screenplay is based on the 1938 novel of the same name by Ernest Haycox.

Man in the Saddle was the third of the many lucrative collaborations between Scott and producer Harry Joe Brown.

== Plot ==
A farmer named Merritt seeks violent measures when a powerful and ruthless land baron tries to take control of his land. Merritt is caught between two women, the ambitious Laurie and the down-to-earth Nan.

Laurie was once Merritt's girl, but she chose to marry Will Isham, partly for his money. Isham is convinced that his wife has returned to Merritt and risks his entire empire on personal vengeance. Lee Repp, one of Isham's gunsels, is captured by Owen and offers a full confession after becoming the target of a knife-throwing act. Isham leads an attempt to intercept Merritt as he tries to bring Repp to the town jail. Merritt and his allies evade Isham's men and lock Repp in the jail. Merritt meets Isham in the hotel, where they agree to a tenuous peace. As Isham is leaving the hotel to stop the violence, Fay Dutcher kills him, and Dutcher is then killed by Merritt.

Laurie vows to take good care of the ranch that she has inherited, leaving Owen free to pursue Nan.

== Cast ==
- Randolph Scott as Owen Merritt
- Joan Leslie as Laurie Bidwell Isham
- Ellen Drew as Nan Melotte
- Alexander Knox as Will Isham
- Richard Rober as Fay Dutcher
- John Russell as Hugh Clagg
- Alfonso Bedoya as Cultus Charley
- Guinn 'Big Boy' Williams as Bourke Prine
- Clem Bevans as Pay Lankershim
- Cameron Mitchell as George Vird
- Richard Crane as Juke Vird
- Frank Sully as Lee Repp
- Tennessee Ernie Ford as a Wrangler / Singer of the main title song (uncredited)
