= Grenville M. Dodge =

Union Army general during the American Civil War

Grenville Mellen Dodge
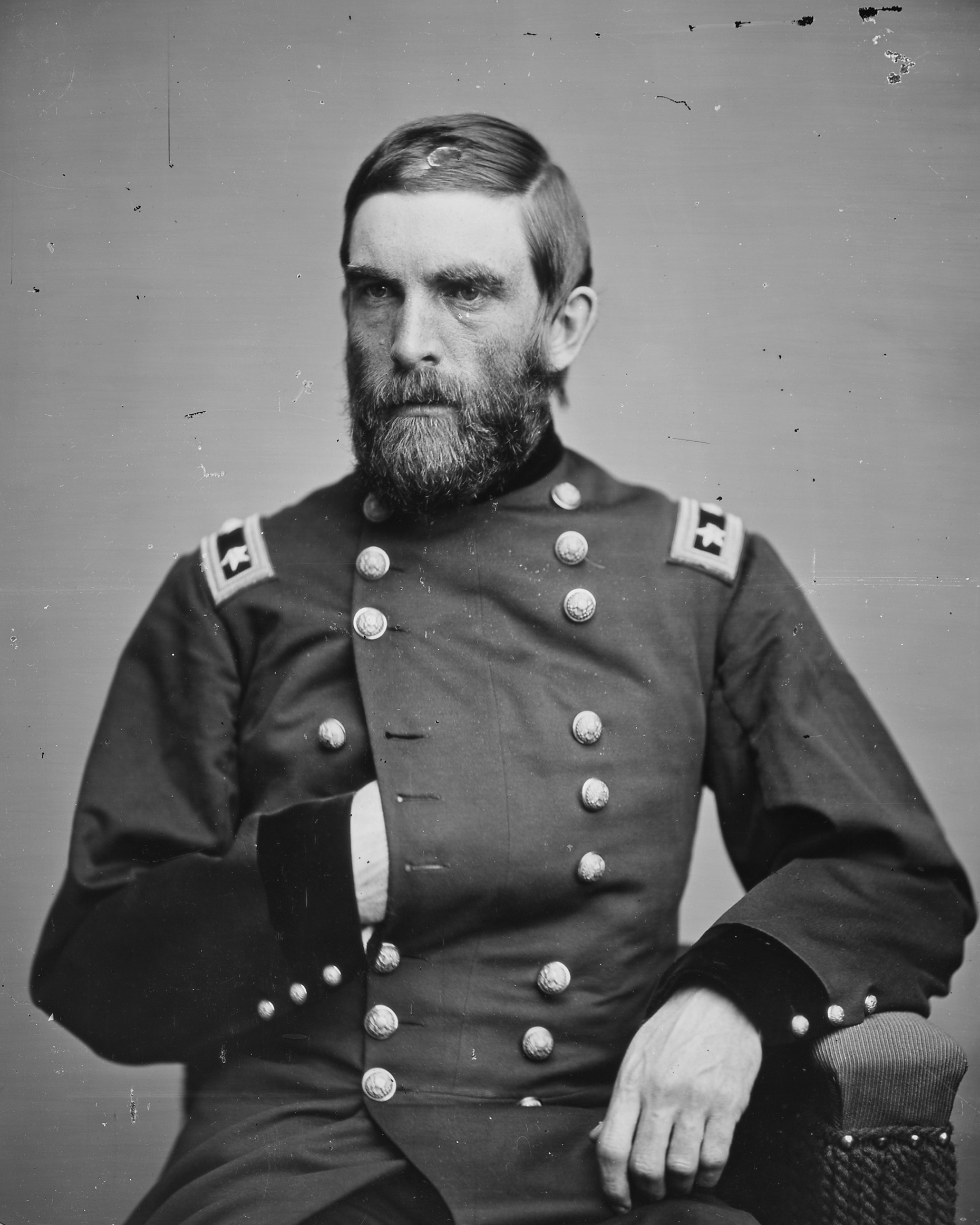
- Dodge c. 1860–1865

Member of the U.S. House of Representatives from Iowa's 5th district
- In office March 4, 1867 – March 3, 1869
- Preceded by: John A. Kasson
- Succeeded by: Francis W. Palmer

Personal details
- Born: April 12, 1831 Danvers, Massachusetts
- Died: January 3, 1916 (aged 84) Council Bluffs, Iowa
- Resting place: Walnut Hill Cemetery, Council Bluffs, Iowa

Military service
- Allegiance: United States of America; Union
- Branch/service: United States Army; Union Army
- Years of service: 1861–66
- Rank: Major General
- Commands: XVI Corps; Department of the Missouri
- Battles/wars: American Civil War; Battle of Pea Ridge; Iuka and Corinth Operations; Vicksburg Campaign; Streight's Raid; Atlanta campaign; American Indian Wars; Powder River Expedition; Battle of the Tongue River

Grenville Mellen Dodge (April 12, 1831 – January 3, 1916) was a Union Army general on the frontier and a pioneering figure in military intelligence during the Civil War, who served as Ulysses S. Grant's intelligence chief in the Western Theater. He served in several notable assignments, including command of the XVI Corps during the Atlanta campaign.

He later commanded troops against Native Americans and served as a U.S. Congressman, businessman, and railroad executive who helped direct the construction of the Transcontinental Railroad. Historian Stanley P. Hirshon suggested that Dodge, "by virtue of the range of his abilities and activities," could be considered "more important in the national life after the Civil War than his more famous colleagues and friends, Grant, Sherman, and Sheridan."

== Early life and career ==
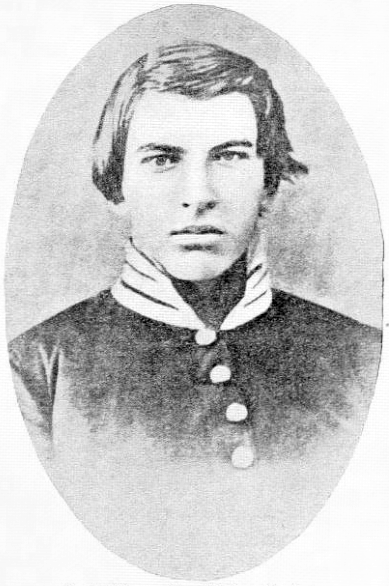
As a cadet at Norwich University

Dodge was born in the Putnamville section of Danvers, Massachusetts, to Sylvanus Dodge and Julia Theresa Phillips, a descendant of the Rev. George Phillips who settled Watertown, Massachusetts in 1630. From the time of his birth until he was 13 years old, Dodge moved frequently while his father tried various occupations. In 1844, Sylvanus Dodge became postmaster of the South Danvers office and opened a bookstore. While working at a neighboring farm, the 14-year-old Grenville met the owner's son, Frederick W. Lander, and helped him survey a railroad. Lander was to become "one [of] the ablest surveyors of the exploration of the West," according to Charles Edgar Ames in Pioneering the Union Pacific. Lander was impressed with Dodge and encouraged him to go to his alma mater, Norwich University (in Vermont) where he was a member of Theta Chi fraternity. Dodge prepared for college by attending Durham Academy in New Hampshire.

In 1851, he graduated from Norwich University with a degree in civil engineering, then moved to Peru, Illinois. He started working as a surveyor and then an ax man for the Illinois Central surveying team, then switched to working for the Peoria division of the Chicago and Rock Island Railroad. He settled in the Missouri River city of Council Bluffs. For the next decade, he was involved in surveying for railroads, including the Union Pacific. He married Ruth Anne Browne of Peru on May 29, 1854. He was also a partner in the Baldwin & Dodge banking firm, and in 1860 served on the Bluffs City Council.

== Civil War ==
Dodge joined the Union Army in the Civil War. At the beginning of the war, Dodge was sent by the Governor of Iowa to Washington, D.C., where he secured 6,000 muskets to supply Iowa volunteers. In July 1861, he was appointed Colonel of the 4th Iowa Volunteer Infantry Regiment. He was wounded in the left leg, near Rolla, Missouri, when a pistol in his coat pocket discharged accidentally.

He commanded the 1st Brigade, 4th Division in the Army of the Southwest at the Battle of Pea Ridge, where he was wounded in the side and hand. For his services at the battle, he was appointed brigadier general of volunteers and placed in command of forces based in Corinth, where his intelligence operation was based.

His commands were known variously as the Central District (Department of the Mississippi); 4th Division (District of West Tennessee); District of Mississippi (Department of Mississippi); 4th Division (District of Jackson, Army of the Tennessee); 4th Division (XIII Corps, Army of the Tennessee); District of Corinth (XVII Corps, Army of the Tennessee); District of Corinth (XVI Corps), Army of the Tennessee; and finally as the 2nd Division (XVI Corps).

Following Confederate General Van Dorn's repulse at the Second Battle of Corinth in October 1862, Dodge's command fought successful engagements near the Hatchie River and then turned to West Tennessee where they captured a band of Confederate guerrillas near Dyersburg. On February 22, 1863, troops from Dodge's command attacked Tuscumbia and the rear column of Van Dorn's column, capturing a piece of artillery, 100 bales of cotton, 100 prisoners and Van Dorn's supply train. He then served as Grant's intelligence Chief through the Vicksburg campaign.

Dodge was later appointed by General Grant as commander of a Division in the Army of the Tennessee, where his troops aided Grant and William T. Sherman by "rapidly repairing and rebuilding the railroads, bridges, and telegraph lines destroyed by the Confederates," and defeating or capturing the Confederate guerrillas, who had been ripping up the track and destroying railroad bridges, by employing techniques such as building two-story blockhouses near the bridges.

In 1863, he was summoned to Washington DC by President Abraham Lincoln, and although Dodge thought he was being called before a court of inquiry for his aggressive recruitment of black soldiers, the President was instead interested in Dodge's railroad expertise, and asked him to divine a location along the Missouri River where the Union Pacific Railroad's transcontinental railroad should have its initial point. The location provided by Dodge was later established by Executive Order as the starting point in 1864. Following the Vicksburg campaign, his own troops joined General Grant and Iowa Governor Samuel J. Kirkwood in petitioning for Dodge's promotion.

Dodge led an expedition to Northern Alabama from April 18, 1863, to May 8, 1863, that screened the advance of Streight's Raid. While Dodge's portion of the expedition was successful, Streight's incursion was disastrous. His command performed various engagements thereafter in northwestern Mississippi and West Tennessee. In December, his forces engaged in a skirmish near Rawhide, twelve miles north of Florence, Alabama that resulted in the capture of 20 prisoners.

He was promoted to major general in June 1864 and commanded the XVI Corps during William T. Sherman's Atlanta campaign. At the Battle of Atlanta, the XVI Corps was held in reserve, but it happened to be placed in a position which directly intercepted John B. Hood's flank attack. During the fighting Dodge rode to the front and personally led Thomas W. Sweeny's division into battle.

This action outraged the one-armed Sweeny so much that he got in a fistfight with Dodge and fellow division commander John W. Fuller. Sweeny received a court-martial for this action while Dodge continued to lead the corps at the Battle of Ezra Church. During the ensuing siege of Atlanta, while looking through an eyehole in the Union breastworks a Confederate sharpshooter spotted him and shot him in the head. After, he was to complete the war as commander of the Department of the Missouri.

Also during the war, he provided information to Thomas Clark Durant who consequently made a fortune smuggling contraband cotton from the Confederate States to fund his intelligence efforts. He would later come into conflict with Durant.

After the war, Dodge joined the Military Order of the Loyal Legion of the United States and was assigned insignia number 484.

== Pioneer of military intelligence ==
His first experience with intelligence gathering came when general John C. Fremont sent Dodge's cavalry regiments on useless raids near Rolla, Missouri based solely on rumors. He set out to rectify this situation and provide accurate intelligence to his superior Samuel Curtis after Fremont was relieved.

The initial group, known as the "Corps of Scouts" was formed from men of the 24th and 25th Missouri Infantry Regiments, who were often assigned to their own neighborhoods and were paid for their expenses, although most refused payment due to their Union loyalties. They are credited with providing the intelligence necessary to achieve victory at Pea Ridge.

Dodge created a highly effective intelligence gathering network which later proved vital to Grant's operations and was a precursor to the modern Intelligence Corps of the United States Army. It was one of the largest of the war, funded by the proceeds of captured Confederate cotton, with over 100 agents, and so effective that their identities remain a mystery even in modern times. It was perhaps the most accurate and comprehensive intelligence gathering network in history up to that time.

His organization, which later became part of the Union Bureau of Military Information, helped Dodge in short order defeat General John Bordenave Villepigue near the Hatchie River, capture Colonel W.W. Faulkner's command of partisan rangers near Island Number Ten and defeat General Earl Van Dorn at the Battle of Tuscumbia during his service with the Army of the Mississippi, and was later vital in the capture of Vicksburg under Grant. Dodge's network also led to the capture of Confederate spy Sam Davis, who was known as the "Nathan Hale of the Confederacy" and also as the "Boy Hero of the Confederacy." Efforts were led from his "war room" in Corinth, and one of the unit's major successes was the discovery and disruption of Coleman's Scouts, the elite secret service unit of rebel General Braxton Bragg.

Dodge would utilize human intelligence from female spies, runaway slaves and unionists living in Confederate territory. He created a Corps of Scouts for special reconnaissance from units of loyal residents of the south in the 1st Tennessee Cavalry and First Alabama Cavalry. He also employed more technical intelligence gathering disciplines such as signals intelligence and counterintelligence by tapping telegraph wires while enciphering the Union Army's own dispatches. He was infamously obsessed with operational security and corresponded by courier rather than telegraph. His agents were trained to avoid exaggerations by innovative methods such as measuring the length of a column along a road.

When General Stephen Hurlbut threatened to cease funding for Dodge's spy operations if Dodge did not turn over the names of his agents, Grant backed Dodge. Even Grant himself did not have this information.

At its peak, his network ran from Georgia (Atlanta and Dalton), to Alabama (Florence, Selma, Decatur, Mobile), to Tennessee (Chattanooga and Columbia) to Mississippi, where information would be reported to Dodge, to Maj. Gen. Richard Oglesby, to Hurlbut in Memphis, to Grant himself, a process of about ten days. Dodge would later report directly to Grant during the Vicksburg campaign, where he even had agents open Confederate General Joseph Johnston's mail. Dodge's agents would report solely to him and him alone, but on May 16, 1863, when intelligence indicated Grant could turn his forces away from Johnston and concentrate on John C. Pemberton's force at Vicksburg, "to achieve timely delivery of information, Dodge violated his own rules of communications security and had his agents report directly to Grant," resulting in the capture of one of his agents and the death of two others.

In 1863, Grant wrote to Dodge that "you have a much more important command than that of a division in the field."

== Indian campaigns ==
As the Civil War was coming to a close, Dodge's Department of the Missouri was expanded to include the departments of Kansas, Nebraska and Utah. During the summer of 1865, Sioux, Cheyenne and Arapaho Indians had been raiding the Bozeman Trail and overland mail routes. Dodge ordered a punitive campaign to quell these raids, which came to be known as the Powder River Expedition. Field command of the expedition was given to Brig. Gen. Patrick Edward Connor, who commanded the District of Utah. Connor's men inflicted a decisive defeat on the Arapaho Indians at the Battle of the Tongue River, but the expedition in general was inconclusive and eventually escalated into Red Cloud's War.

== Railroads ==
Dodge at right center shaking hands with Samuel S. Montague at the Golden Spike Ceremony. Photograph by Andrew J. Russell.

During the 1865 campaign in the Laramie Mountains in Wyoming (known then as the Black Hills), while escaping from a war-party, Dodge realized he had found a pass for the Union Pacific Railroad, west of the Platte River. In May 1866, he resigned from the military and, with the endorsement of Generals Grant and Sherman, became the Union Pacific's chief engineer and thus a leading figure in the construction of the Transcontinental Railroad.

Dodge's job was to plan the route and devise solutions to any obstacles encountered. Dodge had been hired by Herbert M. "Hub" Hoxie, a former Lincoln appointee and winner of the contract to build the first 250 miles of the Union Pacific Railroad. Hoxie assigned the contract to investor Thomas C. Durant who was later prosecuted for attempts to manipulate the route to suit his land-holdings. This brought him into vicious conflict with Dodge and Hoxie. Eventually Durant imposed a consulting engineer named Silas Seymour to spy and interfere with Dodge's decisions.

Seeing that Durant was making a fortune, Dodge bought shares in Durant's company, Crédit Mobilier, which was the main contractor on the project. He made a substantial profit, but when the scandal of Durant's dealings emerged, Dodge removed himself to Texas to avoid testifying in the inquiry.

== Politics and later life ==
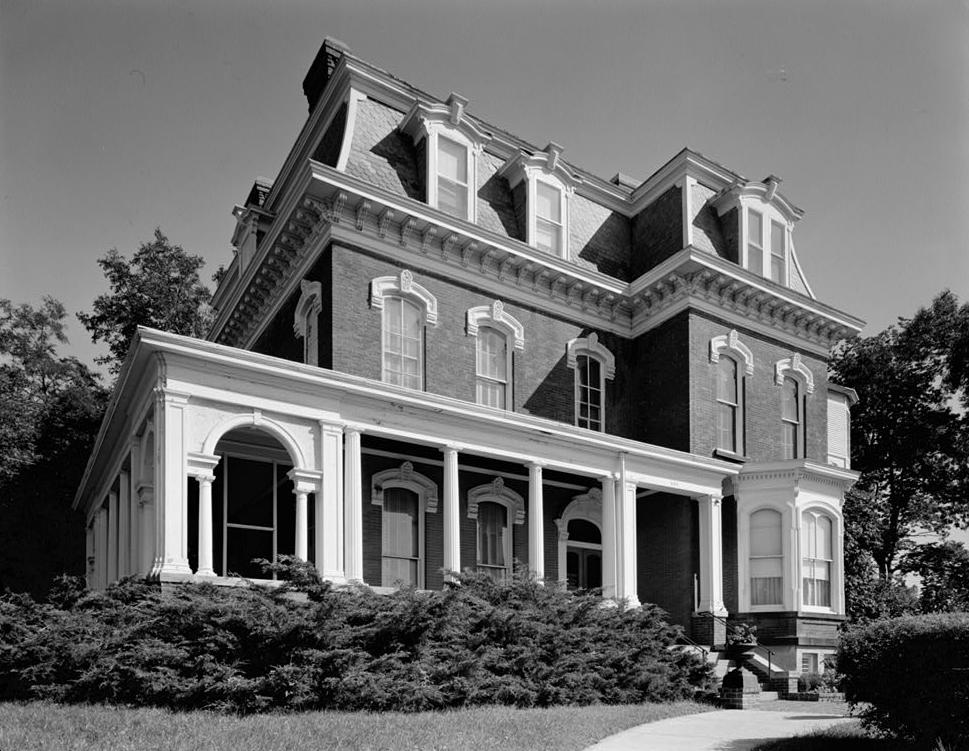
The Grenville M. Dodge House in Council Bluffs, Iowa

In 1866, Dodge defeated incumbent Republican John A. Kasson in the nominating convention to represent Iowa's 5th congressional district in Congress. In the general election, he won, defeating former Union general James M. Tuttle. His election brought problems since he was also away much of the time building the railroad. His time in Washington (during the Fortieth United States Congress), was often spent lobbying on behalf of the Union Pacific, although he supported internal improvements to the West. He served in the House from March 4, 1867, to March 3, 1869. In April he would complete negotiations with Collis Huntington, on behalf of Union Pacific Railroad regarding the completion of the First transcontinental railroad.

He was a delegate to the Republican National Convention in Chicago in 1868 and again at the 1876 convention in Cincinnati. After his term in office expired, he returned to railroad engineering. During the 1880s and 1890s, he served as president or chief engineer of dozens of railroad companies. Dodge went to New York City to manage the growing number of businesses he had developed.

Dodge was appointed to head a commission investigating the conduct of the Army during the Spanish–American War. The commission traveled to several cities in Dodge's personal railroad car. The report was published as a Senate document titled "Report of the Commission appointed by the President to investigate the Conduct of the War Department during the war with Spain." This commission came to be known as the "Dodge Commission".

Dodge returned home to Iowa and died in Council Bluffs in 1916. He is buried there in Walnut Hill Cemetery. His home, the Grenville M. Dodge House, is a National Historic Landmark.

== Legacy ==
Fort Dodge in Kansas, an important army base during the settlement of the western frontier, was named in his honor, as was Dodge City.

The Interstate 480 bridge over the Missouri River is named the Grenville Dodge Memorial Bridge in his honor. Camp Dodge—the Iowa Army National Guard Center in Johnston, Iowa—is named after him. Dodge Hall at his alma mater, Norwich University, is also named after him.

Although Dodge Street in Omaha, Nebraska, the location of Union Pacific Headquarters, was originally named for Iowa Senator Augustus C. Dodge, a resolution was passed by the City Council in 2016 to clarify that Dodge Street is named after Grenville Dodge and his brother, NP Dodge.

In 1963, Grenville Dodge was inducted into the Hall of Great Westerners of the National Cowboy & Western Heritage Museum.

The SS Grenville M. Dodge, a Liberty Ship built in World War II, was named for him.

== See also ==
- List of American Civil War generals (Union)
- Grenville M. Dodge House
- First Transcontinental Railroad

U.S. House of Representatives
Preceded by John A. Kasson	Member of the U.S. House of Representatives from Iowa's 5th congressional district March 4, 1867 – March 3, 1869	Succeeded by Francis W. Palmer
