= Ernest Haycox =

American novelist (1899-1950)

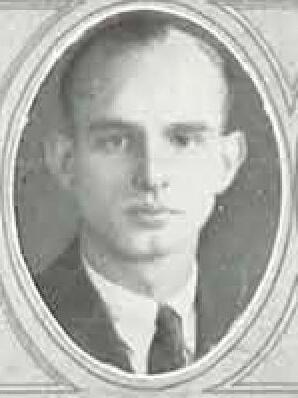
Haycox in 1923

Ernest James Haycox (October 1, 1899 – October 13, 1950) was an American writer of Western fiction.

== Biography ==
Haycox was born in Portland, Oregon, to William James Haycox and the former Martha Burghardt on October 1, 1899. After receiving an education in the local schools of both Washington state and Oregon, he enlisted in the United States Army in 1915 and was stationed along the Mexican border in 1916. During World War I he was in Europe, and after the war he spent one year at Reed College in Portland. In 1923, Haycox graduated from the University of Oregon with a Bachelor of Arts degree in journalism, where he also started writing under professor W. F. G. Thacher. In 1925, Haycox married Jill M. Chord, and they had two children.

He published two dozen novels and about 300 short stories, many of which appeared first in pulp magazines in the early 1920s. During the 1930s and 1940s, he was a regular contributor to Collier's Weekly from 1931 and The Saturday Evening Post from 1943. Fans of his work included Gertrude Stein and Ernest Hemingway, and the latter once wrote, "I read The Saturday Evening Post whenever it has a serial by Ernest Haycox."

His story "Stage to Lordsburg" (1937) was made into the movie Stagecoach (1939), directed by John Ford and featuring John Wayne in the role that made him a star. The novel Trouble Shooter (1936), originally serialized in Collier's, was the basis for the movie Union Pacific (1939), directed by Cecil B. DeMille, starring Barbara Stanwyck and Joel McCrea. Haycox wrote the screenplay for Montana (1950), directed by Ray Enright, which stars Alexis Smith and Errol Flynn.

Haycox died after unsuccessful cancer surgery in 1950, twelve days after his 51st birthday, in Portland. In 2005, the Western Writers of America voted Haycox one of the 24 best Western authors of the Twentieth Century.

=== Burnt Creek stories ===
While living in New York Haycox wrote his first series of interconnected stories set in Burnt Creek, a town in central Oregon.

=== Stories set during the American Revolution ===
From 1924 through 1926, Haycox lived in New York City, and he became deeply interested in the American Revolution. Haycox made several trips to battlefields in New York, New Jersey, Pennsylvania, Connecticut, and Massachusetts and wrote eight stories and two novelettes set during that era. After publishing one of these stories, Haycox received a letter from a reader stating that Haycox did not describe the uniforms of the soldiers correctly. Haycox promptly purchased a book on the Revolutionary era military uniforms. After his move back to Oregon in 1926, Haycox concentrated on Westerns, and he precisely researched the military uniforms of eras he wrote about.

=== New Hope stories ===
Appearing in Collier's between 1933 and 1938, these stories are set in New Hope, a trading town on the Missouri River in the 1880s. Many of these stories are told in the first person, a device Haycox used about a dozen times during his writing career.

=== Serial and historical novels ===
Beginning in the mid-1930s, Haycox began to write novels and a few stories which are based on historical events. The first of these was Trouble Shooter (1936), followed by The Border Trumpet (1939), Alder Gulch (1942) and Bugles in the Afternoon (1943). Trouble Shooter, according to Haycox' son, Ernest Haycox Jr. was based upon Charles Sharman's journal of his experiences as a civil engineer constructing the Union Pacific Railroad to Promontory Point in 1869.

"His narrative provided my father with a good deal of background and color though, except for the incident of the unhorsed Indian, few useful specifics. Trouble Shooter told the story of Frank Peace, nominally a (civil) engineer working with (Samuel) Reed but mostly (Grenville) Dodge's hired gun on the line. As such, Peace was frequently confined to those iniquitous siding towns, of which Sharman knew little. The novel first appeared in serial form in Collier's magazine in 1936 and was the basis of the Cecil B. DeMille motion picture epic Union Pacific, released in 1939." Wilcox, Jr., 2001

At the same time as these novels were written, Haycox continued to write novels and short stories which had an ambiance and milieu of the West but which were not based on specific events or places. Somewhere in between these two kinds of novels is Trail Town, which is based on Abilene, Kansas, and Marshal Tom Smith, but which is nonetheless a work of fiction, where Abilene becomes River Bend and Tom Smith becomes Dan Mitchell. Haycox did write a story set in Abilene with Sheriff Tom Smith as a character called On Texas Street. Haycox's historical novels are the ones which Professors Etulain and Tanner write most about in their essays and books about Haycox, but Luke Short preferred Haycox's non-historical novels: "My favorite Haycox yarns don’t lean on a known time or place…. In these stories, I suspect Haycox made his own geography, named his own towns and mountains and rivers; he peopled them with tough abrasive characters whose only law was their self will."

=== Unpublished novel and story ===
Haycox wrote National Beauty in 1939 about a woman in Oregon who wins beauty contests, and goes to Hollywood, but is not successful in the movie industry. Collier's declined this novel, and the manuscript apparently was destroyed, as it was not included in the preserved Ernest Haycox Papers. Collier's also rejected the story "Boyhood."

=== Land Rush stories ===
Starting in 1940 Haycox published five stories in Collier's about settlers in a town named Ingrid. The stories are "Some Were Brave" (1940) (later retitled "Land Rush"), "Dark Land Waiting" (1940), "The Claim Jumpers" (1940), "Faithfully, Judith" (1942), and "Deep Winter" (1943). A sixth story, "Early Fall," was one of Haycox's rare rejections.

=== Two novels concurrently serialized ===
Haycox was one of the most successful writers in the slick magazine market of the 1940s. In 1943 Collier's and The Saturday Evening Post serialized two different Haycox novels at the same time. Collier's serialized The Wild Bunch beginning on August 28, 1943, and continued on September 4, 1943, September 11, 1943, September 18, 1943, September 25, 1943, and concluded on October 2, 1943. The Saturday Evening Post serialized Bugles in the Afternoon beginning on August 21, 1943, and continued August 28, 1943, September 4, 1943, September 11, 1943, September 18, 1943, September 25, 1943, October 2, 1943, and concluded on October 9, 1943.

=== The Mercy Family stories ===
At the end of 1948 through the beginning of 1949 Haycox published three stories, one in Collier's and two in The Saturday Evening Post, featuring the Mercy family. These stories are Haycox's "tribute to the pioneer mother."

== Quotations ==
"No sensible man watches his feet hit ground. He looks ahead to see what kind of ground they'll hit next." – Pioneer Loves. Call This Land Home

== Selected works ==
Note: Many of Haycox's novels and stories have been published under more than one title. The list below shows the titles used for the original publications.

=== Novels ===
- Free Grass (1928)
- Chaffee of Roaring Hors (1929)
- Whispering Range (1931)
- Starlight Rider (1933)
- Riders West (1934)
- Rough Air (1934)
- The Silver Desert (1935)
- Trail Smoke (1936)
- Trouble Shooter (1936)
- Deep West (1937)
- Sundown Jim (1937)
- Man in the Saddle (1938)
- The Border Trumpet (1939)
- Saddle and Ride (1940)
- Rim of the Desert (1940)
- Trail Town (1941)
- Alder Gulch (1942)
- Action by Night (1943)
- The Wild Bunch (1943)
- Bugles in the Afternoon (1943—serialized in The Saturday Evening Post—Haycox's debut in that publication)
- Canyon Passage (1945)
- Long Storm (1946)
- Head of the Mountain (1952)
- The Earthbreakers (1952)
- The Adventurers (1954)

=== Short stories and novellas ===
1920s

- "The Trap Lifters" (1922)
- "The Coolie Catcher" (1923)
- "A Burnt Creek Yuletide" (1924—A Burnt Creek story)
- "The Ditch to Freedom" (1924)
- "Budd Dabbles in Homesteads" (1924—A Burnt Creek story)
- "When Money Went to His Head" (1924—A Burnt Creek story)
- "Stubborn People" (1924—A Burnt Creek story)
- "A Wooing in the Wilds" (1925)
- "Prairie Yule" (1925—A Burnt Creek story)
- "Red Knives" (1925—Set in the Ohio River Valley during the American Revolution)
- "Light of the West" (1926)
- "A Battle Piece" (1926—Set during the American Revolution)
- "Frontier Blood" (1926)
- "False Face" (1926—A Burnt Creek story)
- "Rockbound Honesty" (1926—A Burnt Creek story)
- "The Code" (1926)
- "The Timberline Fugitive" (1927)
- "The Gun-Shot Path" (1927)
- "Winds of Rebellion" (1927—Set during the American Revolution)
- "Drums Roll" (1927—Set during the American Revolution)
- "Deserter at Valley Forge" (1927—Set during the American Revolution)
- "Under Western Skies" (1927)
- "The Belle of Sevensticks" (1927)
- "A Rider of the High Mesa" (1927)
- "A New Deal in Sevensticks" (1927)
- "One Night in Blackfoot" (1927)
- "The Man From Montana" (1927)
- "Bound South" (1928-A Breedlove-Bowers story)
- "Starlight and Gunflame" (1928)
- "The Octopus of Pilgrim Valley" (1928)
- "The Desert Eye" (1928)
- "Secret River" (1928)
- "A Municipal Feud" (1928-A Breedlove-Bowers story)
- "The Sheriff of Crooked Rib" (1928)
- "The Grim Canyon" (1928)
- "Guns Up!" (1928)
- "Sevensticks Gambler" (1928)
- "Contention—Two Miles Ahead (1929-A Breedlove-Bowers story)
- "The Bandit from Paloma County" (1929)
- "Renegade Law" (1929)
- "Brand Fires on the Ridge" (1929)
- "The Return of a Fighter" (1929)
- "Fighting Man" (1929)
- "Invitation by Bullet" (1929-A Breedlove-Bowers story)
- "Discovery Gulch" (1929)
- "Night Raid" (1929-A Breedlove-Bowers story)
- "Wild Horse Lode" (1929)
- "The Trail of the Barefoot Pony (1929-A Breedlove-Bowers story)
- "Five Hard Men" (1929-A Breedlove-Bowers story)
- "By Rope and Lead" (1929)--a Peach Murgatroyd story, not collected in the short story collection of the same name. Collected in Powder Smoke and Other Stories.

1930s

- "The Killers" (1930-A Breedlove-Bowers story)
- "Pistol Gap" (1930)
- "Son of the West" (1930)
- "Dolorosa, Here I Come" (1931—first appearance in Collier's)
- "Crossfire" (1931)
- "Manhunt" (1931)
- "The Gun Singer" (1931)
- "Old Tough Heart" (1931)
- "Ride Out!" (1931)
- "Smoke Talk" (1931)
- "McQuestion Rides" (1931)
- "The Feudists" (1932)
- "The Fighting Call" (1932)
- "The Roaring Hour" (1932)
- "Hang Up My Gun" (1932)
- "Blizzard Camp" (1932)
- "The Kid From River Red" (1932)
- "Found Out" (1932)
- "Breed of the Frontier" (1932)
- "Farewell, Laramie, Farewell!" (1932)
- "Their Own Lights" (1933—a New Hope story)
- "The Decision" (1933)
- "At Wolf Creek Tavern" (1933)
- "The Hour of Fury" (1933—a New Hope story)
- "Gambler's Heart" (1933)
- "Odd Chance" (1933)
- "Their Own Lights" (1933—aka "Episode −1880–" a New Hope Story)
- "Second-Money Man" (1933)
- "Behind the Headlines" (1934)
- "Smoky Pass" (1934) (A revised version of this serial was published as Riders West, by Doubleday Doran, not as Rough Air as is sometimes claimed.)
- "Pride" (1934)
- "The Man with Smoke Gray Eyes(1934—a New Hope story)
- "High Wind" (1935)
- "Way Up the Bozeman" (1935)
- "Make Me Believe" (1935)
- "Against the Mob" (1935—a New Hope story)
- "Once and for All (1935—a New Hope story)
- "Born to Conquer" (1936—from 1936 to 1942 Haycox's stories and novels appeared in Collier's)
- "The Stranger" (1936)
- "Proud People" (1936—a New Hope story)
- "Woman Hungry" (1937)
- "Stage to Lordsburg" (1937)
- "Free Land" (1937)
- "Scout Detail" (1938-a Military story)
- "This Woman and This Man" (1938-not a Western story.)
- "Down the River" (1938—a New Hope story)
- "A Man Needs an Answer" (1938)
- "An Interval in Youth" (1938—a New Hope story)
- "Blizzard" (1939)
- "Fourth Son" (1939)
- "The Long Years" (1939)
- "A Girl Must Wait" (1939-not a Western story.)

1940s and later

- "The Drifter" (1940)(Collier's title for Haycox's novel The Rim of the Desert)
- "The Silver Saddle" (1940)
- "Change of Station" (1940)
- "Room 515" (1940)
- "On Don Jaime Street" (1940)
- "Some Were Brave" (1940) (Later retitled "Land Rush" the first of the Land Rush stories.
- "Dark Land Waiting" (1940) (The second Land Rush story.)
- "The Claim Jumpers" (1940) (The third Land Rush story.)
- "Weight of Command" (1940-a military story)
- "Martinet" (1941-a military story)
- "The Quarrel" (1941)
- "Dispatch for the General" (1942-a military story)
- "Second Choice" (1942)
- "Faithfully, Judith" (1942) (The fourth Land Rush story.)
- "Always Remember" (1942)
- "A Young Man's Fancy" (1942)
- "Skirmish at Dry Fork" (1942)
- "Time of Change" (1942)
- "The Colonel's Choice" (1942-a military story)
- "Deep Winter" (1943) (The fifth Land Rush story.)
- "Paycheck" (1943)
- "Only the Best" (1943)
- "From the Tuality" (1943)
- "At Anselm's" (1944)
- "Departure" (1946)
- "Snow in the Canyon" (1948)
- "Mrs. Benson" (1948)
- "Custom of the Country" (1948)
- "Dead-Man Trail" (1948)
- "Night of Parting" (1948)
- "Cry Deep, Cry Still" (Collier's November 28, 1948)--Story features the Mercy family.
- "Call This Land Home" (Saturday Evening Post December 4, 1948)--Story features the Mercy family.
- "Things Remembered" (1949)
- "Violent Interlude" (Saturday Evening Post February 26. 1949)--Story features the Mercy family.
- "Outlaw's Reckoning" (1949)
- "The Land That Women Hate" (1949)
- "The Inscrutable Man" (1951)

=== Story and novella collections ===
- Outlaw (1939)
- Murder on the Frontier (1942—These stories appeared in Collier's from June 1931 to February 1942.)
- Pioneer Loves (1948)
- Prairie Guns (1949)
- The Last Rodeo (1949)
- Rough Justice (1950)
- By Rope and Lead (1951)
- Rawhide Range (1952—Collects ten stories first published in Collier's between 1939 and 1949.)
- Vengeance Trail (1955)
- Winds of Rebellion (1955—Collects Haycox's Revolutionary War stories.)
- Gun Talk (1956—Collects six pulp stories published in Short Stories Magazine between 1927 and 1933.)
- Brand Fires on the Ridge (1959)
- The Feudists (1960)
- Best Western Stories (1960 edition published by Bantam collects Rough Justice, By Rope and Lead, Pioneer Loves & Murder on the Frontier. 1975 edition published by Signet collects only Rough Justice & Murder on the Frontier.)
- The Man From Montana (1964—Collects 11 stories.)
- Outlaw Guns (1964)
- Sixgun Duo (1965)
- Trigger Trio (1966)
- Powder Smoke and Other Stories (1966)
- Guns of Fury (1967)
- Starlight and Gunflame (1973)
- Frontier Blood (1974)
- Burnt Creek: A Frontier Duo (1996—Collects Haycox's Burnt Creek stories and "Red Knives" a story set in the Ohio Valley)
- New Hope (1998—Collects—The Roaring Hour—The Kid from Red River—The Hour of Fury—Haycox's New Hope Stories)

=== Nonfiction ===
- "A Persistent Writer's Success," The Writer, September 1922

== Filmography ==
- Union Pacific (1939), based on Trouble Shooter (1936)
- Stagecoach (1939), based on the short story "Stage to Lordsburg" (1937)
- Sundown Jim (1942), based on Sundown Jim (1937)
- Apache Trail (1942), based on the short story "Stage Station" (1939)
- Abilene Town (1946), based on Trail Town (1941)
- Canyon Passage (1946), based on Canyon Passage (1945)
- Man in the Saddle (1952), based on Man in the Saddle (1938)
- Apache War Smoke (1952), based on the short story "Stage Station" (1939)
- Bugles in the Afternoon (1952), based on Bugles in the Afternoon (1943)
- The Far Country (1954), based partially on Alder Gulch (1942)
- Stagecoach (1966), based on the short story "Stage to Lordsburg" (1937)
