= Sherman, Wyoming =

Unincorporated community in Wyoming, United States

- Ghost town
- Location within Wyoming Location within the United States
- Coordinates: 41°05′52″N 105°21′03″W
- Country: United States
- State: Wyoming
- County: Albany
- Elevation: 8,035 ft (2,449 m)
- Time zone: UTC-7 (Mountain (MST))
  - Summer (DST): UTC-6 (MDT)
- Area code: 307
- GNIS feature ID: 1594258

Sherman is a ghost town in Albany County, Wyoming, United States. Sherman is 19 miles (31 km) southeast of Laramie in the Laramie Mountains and is named for Civil War and Indian Wars general William Tecumseh Sherman, purportedly at his request. From the 1860s to 1918, the town sat at the summit of the original grade of the first transcontinental railroad along the rails of the Union Pacific Railroad.

The Union Pacific construction crews had initially called the area Lone Tree Pass and Evans Pass. The original name honored James A. Evans, who surveyed the area searching for a shorter route through Wyoming than the trails that crossed at South Pass.

The town was abandoned after the Union Pacific moved its tracks to the south, but the townsite is still the location of the Ames Monument, erected by the railroad to mark its original high point. Today the high point of the Overland Route, as well as the high points along Interstate 80 and U.S. Route 30, about 7.5 miles (12.1 km) north-northwest of the former town, are called Sherman Summit or Sherman Hill Summit.

== Ghost town ==
Sherman in 1870

The small town of Sherman arose at the site north of the tracks where trains stopped to change engines on their transcontinental journey. The stop provided a roundhouse with five stalls and a turntable, two section houses, and a windmill with water tank. Trains were inspected at Sherman before beginning the long descent from the Sherman Pass summit, either east towards Cheyenne or west across the 130-foot (40 m) high Dale Creek Bridge to the Laramie Valley. The trusses for the original wooden trestle bridge located west of Sherman were prefabricated in Chicago and shipped to the site. The bridge was the highest railroad bridge in the world at the time of its completion in 1868.

Several hundred people lived in Sherman, hunkered down upon a rocky, barren landscape interrupted only by a general store, post office, schoolhouse, two hotels (Sherman House and Summit House), and two saloons.

In 1885, William Murphy purchased the land that contained the Ames Monument, intending to cover the pyramid with advertising. The Union Pacific Railroad Company had other plans. The company obtained a special deed to the property in 1889. The railroad company twice moved its tracks southward toward more gradual grades over the Laramie Mountains, eroding Sherman's tenuous existence a few hundred yards west of the monument. The town's death knell came in 1918, when the railroad company closed its station house and moved the tracks about three miles (5 km) south. Residents soon abandoned Sherman, leaving behind a small cemetery that is still present today.

== Nearby summits ==
=== Interstate 80 ===
Sherman Summit or Sherman Hill Summit, elevation 8,640 ft (2,630 m), is a mountain pass about 7.5 miles (12.1 km) north-northwest of the ghost town of Sherman at 41.23635°N 105.43655°W. While not a particularly rugged mountain crossing, it is the highest point of the transcontinental Interstate 80. The Abraham Lincoln Memorial Monument is located there.

=== Lincoln Highway ===
Just southwest of present-day Sherman Summit at 41.23308°N 105.44127°W , at an elevation of about 8,820 ft (2,690 m), is the highest point on the original transcontinental Lincoln Highway and its successor, U.S. 30. This location, where the pavement is still in place, is known simply as The Summit. The bronze bust of Abraham Lincoln once stood here; it has been moved to Sherman Summit.

=== Overland Route ===
As a result of the track move, the high point on this section of the railroad, known as the Overland Route, is now about 3.4 miles (5.5 km) southeast of the Ames Monument at 41°05′52″N 105°21′03″W, at an elevation of 8,014 ft (2,443 m). There is no town there, but the official railroad name for this location is Sherman. However, this point (like the Ames Monument) is not actually on the crest of the Laramie Mountains, which is now surmounted via the nearby Hermosa Tunnel at the slightly lower elevation of 7,960 ft (2,430 m). 146 mi (235 km) to the west, the railroad crosses the Continental Divide of the Americas at the town of Creston.

== See also ==
- Buford, Wyoming: town near Sherman Summit that claims to be the highest town on Interstate 80.
- Albany County, Wyoming monuments and markers
