= Herbert Melville Hoxie =

Herbert Melville "Hub" Hoxie (December 18, 1830 to November 23, 1886) was a pioneer, abolitionist, railroad executive and the first Republican United States Marshal in the State of Iowa during the American Civil War. He is closely associated with Jay Gould, Grenville Dodge and the early Republican Party.

== Early life ==
Descended from early pioneers of the Plymouth Colony in Massachusetts, Hub Hoxie was born in Palmyra, Wayne County, New York on December 18, 1830 to Benjamin Tobey Hoxie and Ruth Peck; his siblings were Melissa Peck Hoxie Fagen, Melville Benjamin Hoxie, Rose M. Hoxie Stevens Hoyt, and William H. Hoxie.

When he was five years old, his parents moved the family to where Des Moines, Iowa now stands. There his family worked the trading post near Fort Des Moines No. 2, and young Herbert assisted his father in farming and in trading with the Indians. By 1840, his father kept the Hoxie House — later known as the Jefferson Hotel. Hub's father was also a trustee of the Methodist Society by 1844.

== Gold Fever ==
In 1850, Hub traveled overland to California to seek his fortune in the gold rush. His sister, Melissa, joined him and married Dr. Pierce Bye Fagan. Not as lucky as Melissa's husband, Hub returned to Iowa, where he became interested in politics. In 1857 married Anna Maria Patrick, the niece of Des Moines' founding father, Thomas Mitchell, who in around 1844 became Polk County's first permanent English-speaking settler, its first sheriff and later a state legislator. Their only child, a son named Seward, died at the age of three.

== Early Republican and abolitionist ==
Hub joined the new Republican Party with Thomas Mitchell and helped the Underground Railroad. Hub rose from secretary to chairman of the Republican State Central Committee by 1860 when Abraham Lincoln won the presidency and the Republicans took control of Congress.

=== United States Marshal during the Civil War ===
During the war, Hoxie's influence within the party and in state politics increased as he allied himself with Republican power players such as James W. Grimes, William B. Allison, John A. Kasson and Grenville M. Dodge. This last political ally supported Hoxie's bid for the position of United States Marshal. Hub Hoxie served the Lincoln Administration as Iowa's first Republican United States Attorney.

== Railroad Executive ==
=== The Union Pacific Railroad ===
Letters exchanged Dodge, a Union Officer in the war, and Hoxie during American Civil War, reveal that the two men remained close and fought for their cause, each in his own way. Hoxie and other prominent Republicans pushed hard for Dodge's promotion to Brigadier General. Hoxie believed that Dodge possessed "a kind of general supervision of affairs civil and military in the state." At Hoxie's death, Dodge described his life and behind-the-scenes contributions to Iowa politics when he said: "We want some Hoxies in the Republican party just now."

With the war coming to an end, Hoxie and Dodge used their positions to advance the causes of the Union Pacific Railroad and Thomas Durant. In August 1864, Hub Hoxie submitted a plan to build and equip the first 100 miles of the railroad at a charge of $50,000 per mile. In September, his contract was amended to include an additional 147 miles for a total contract price of $12.35 million. A special committee of Union Pacific's Board of Directors that included John Adams Dix, George T.M. Davis and Cornelius Bushnell formally accepted it on September 23, 1864.

Chief Engineer Peter Dey resigned over the high price of the contract—he had estimated it to be $27,000 per mile-he considered this to be "another of Durant's schemes." Hoxie assigned his contract, at the direction of Durant, to Crédit Mobilier of America and others in exchange for cash, stock and a position in the company, all three of which he received.

=== Hoxie and Jay Gould ===
In late 1870 Hub moved to Palestine, Texas, where he was general superintendent of the International Railroad. Two years later, he became general manager of the International & Great Northern and of the Texas & Pacific Railroad in 1880. He also managed the Iron Mountain and the St. Louis & Southern. In 1883 Hoxie became first vice-president for Jay Gould and his Southwestern system. In 1885 he became Gould's general manager, headquartered in St. Louis, MO.

== Death and legacy ==
Hub Hoxie died from complications from surgery on his kidney stones on November 23, 1886, at the Bradbury Apartment House, Broadway and 40th Street in New York City. Hub Hoxie is the namesake of Hoxie, Arkansas and Hoxie, Kansas.
