= Dale Creek Crossing =

Former rail bridge in Wyoming, US

- Dale Creek Crossing (48AB145)
- U.S. National Register of Historic Places
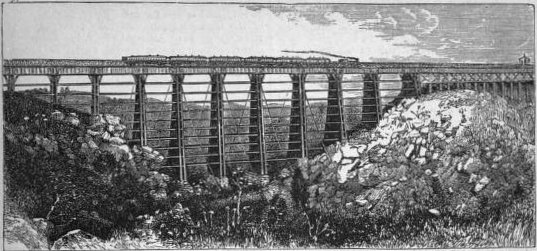
- Original Dale Creek wooden bridge of 1868

- Location within Wyoming Location within the United States
- Nearest city: Laramie, Wyoming
- Coordinates: 41°6′14″N 105°27′17″W
- Built: 1868 / 1876
- Architect: Union Pacific
- NRHP reference No.: 86001027
- Added to NRHP: May 09, 1986

Dale Creek Crossing was a railway bridge located in present-day Wyoming. The 650-foot (200 m) bridge, completed in 1868 in the southeastern Wyoming Territory, presented engineers of the United States' first transcontinental railroad one of their most difficult challenges. Dale Creek Bridge, the longest bridge on the Union Pacific Railroad (UP), reached 150 feet (46 m) above Dale Creek, two miles (3.2 km) west of Sherman, Wyoming. The first Dale Creek Bridge was a wooden structure 720 feet in length. The eastern approach to the bridge site, near the highest elevation on the UP, 8,247 feet (2,514 m) above sea level, required cutting through granite for nearly a mile. Solid rock also confronted workers on the west side of the bridge where they made a cut one mile (1.6 km) in length.

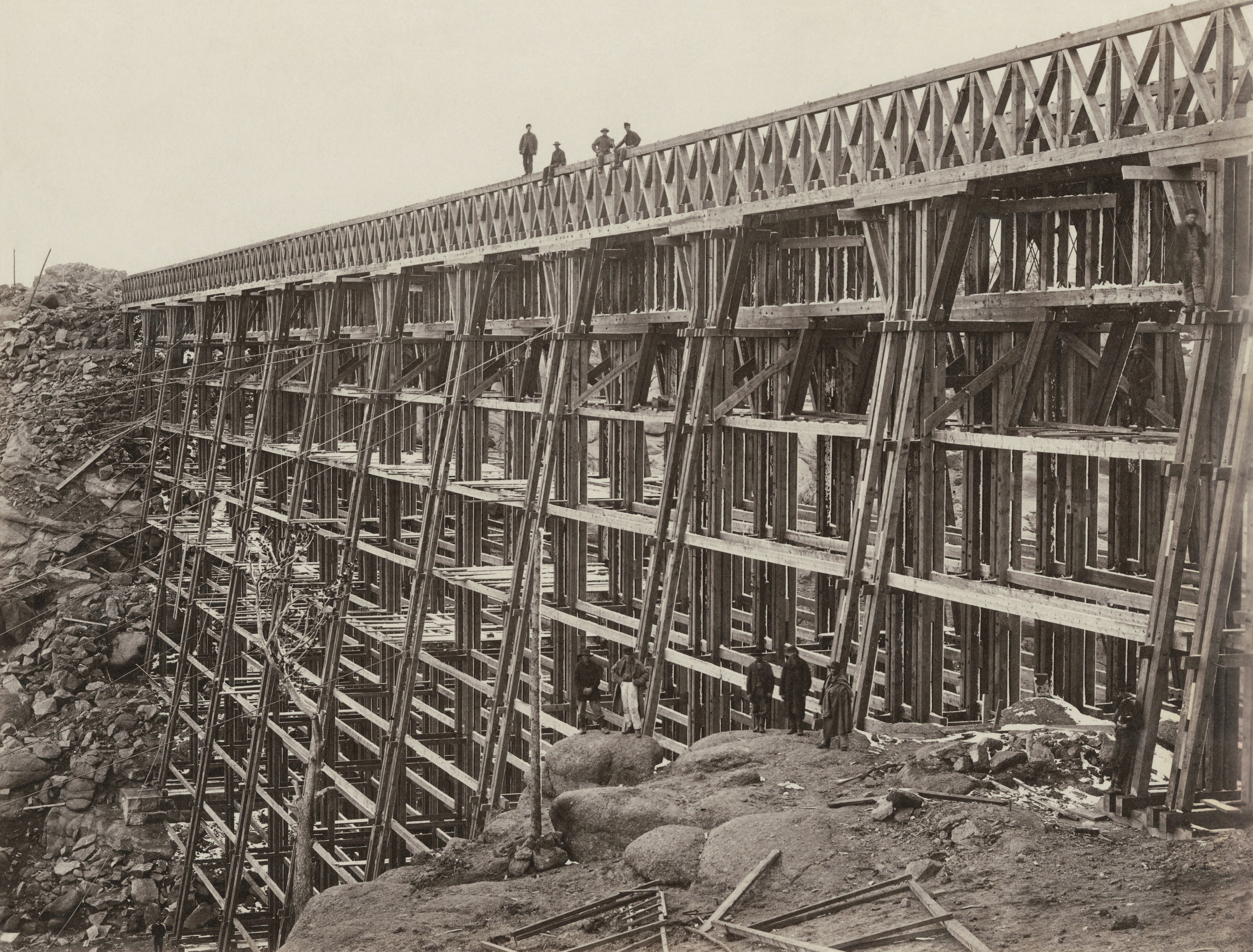
The original Dale Creek wooden bridge under construction, Harper's Weekly, 1868

Originally built of wood, the trestle swayed in the wind as the first train crossed on April 23, 1868. In the days following, as carpenters rushed to shore up the bridge, two fell to their deaths. The bridge's timbers flexed under the strain of passing trains.

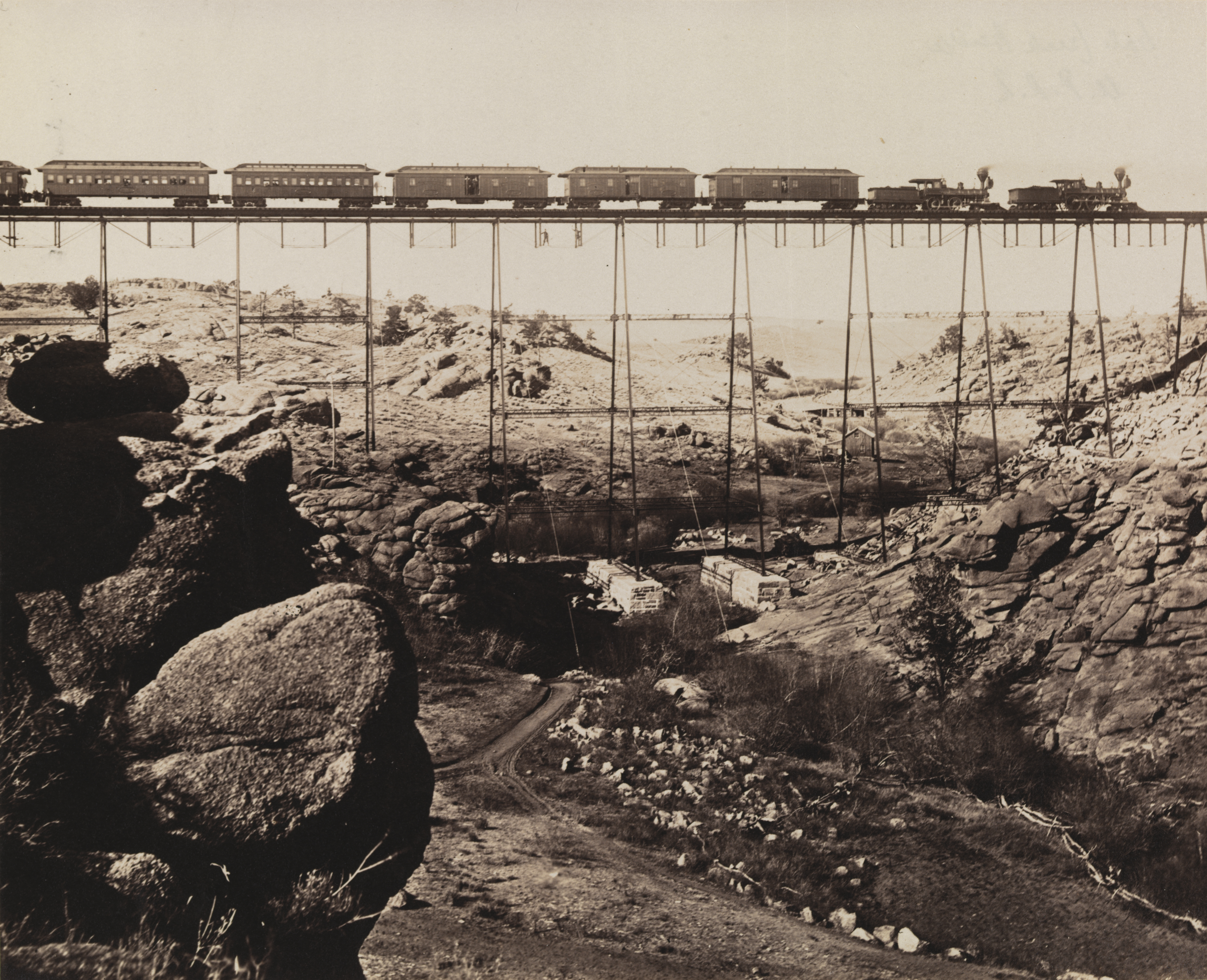
Dale Creek Iron Viaduct before reinforcements

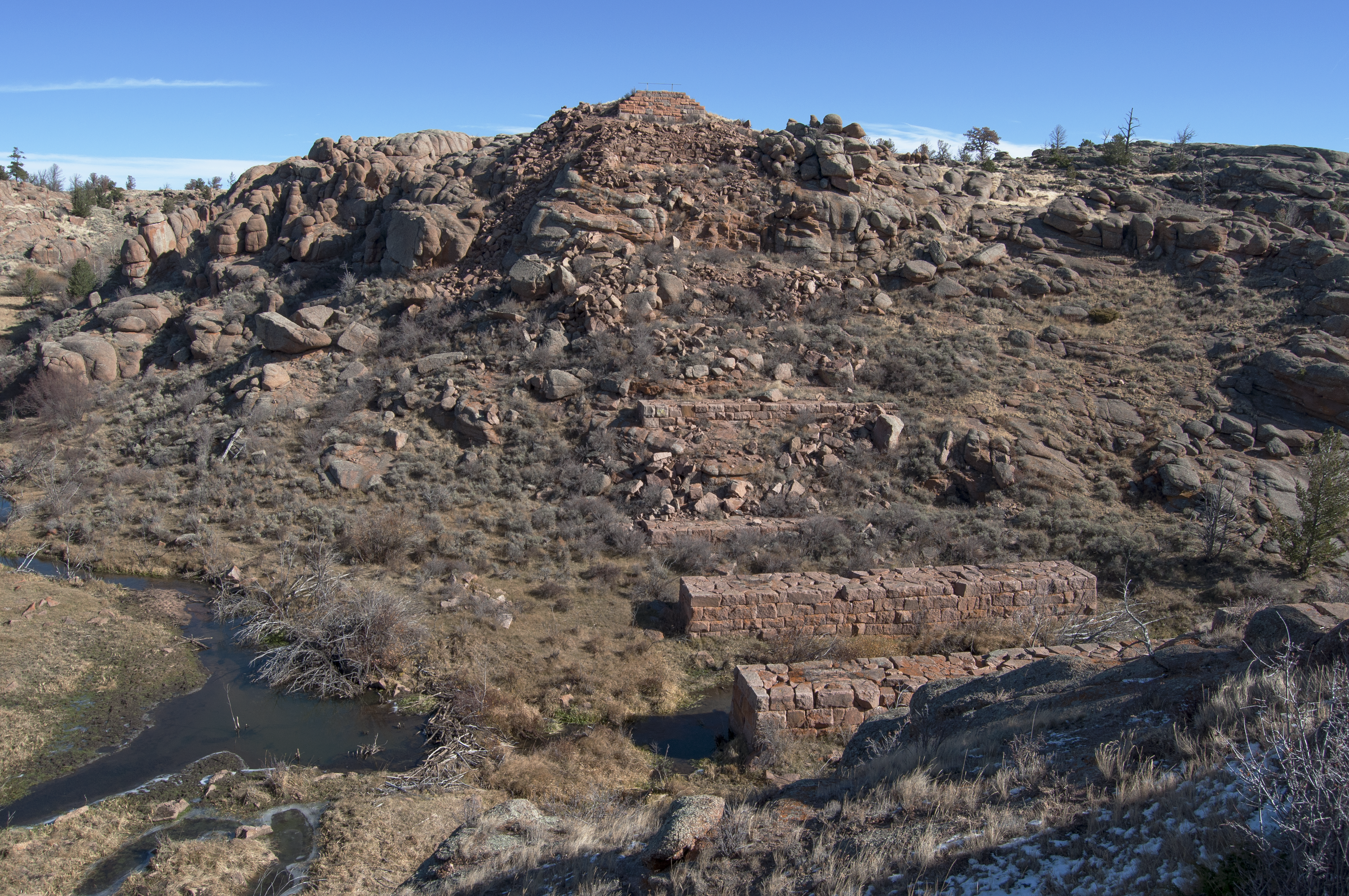
Extant abutments, northeast side of gorge, Dale Creek Crossing. Image by Richard Koenig; seen October 29, 2010.

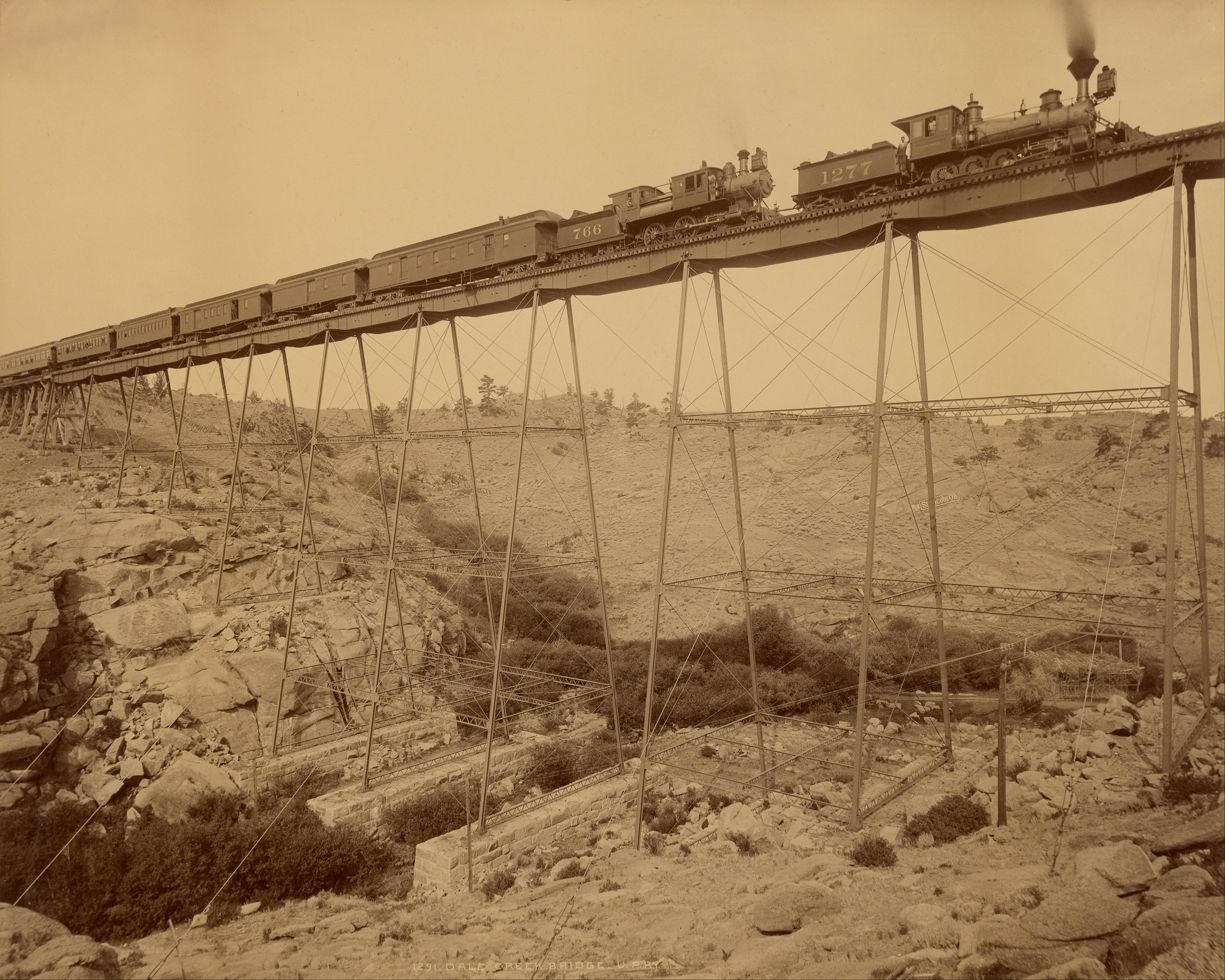
The second bridge in 1885, after reinforcements

The original bridge was replaced on the 1868 piers in 1876 by an iron bridge, manufactured by the American Bridge Company. The wooden approaches at each end remained in place when the iron bridge was built. The western approach caught fire in 1884, and was repaired. The UP installed girder spans and granite abutments to strengthen the bridge in 1885. Engineers installed guy wires on the wooden bridge and its iron replacement in an attempt to stabilize the structures.

The replacement iron "spider web" bridge was dismantled in 1901, when the Union Pacific completed construction of a new alignment over Sherman Hill as part of a major reconstruction and improvement project, shortening the Overland Route by 30.47 miles (49 km).
