= Andrew J. Russell =

American photographer (1829–1902)

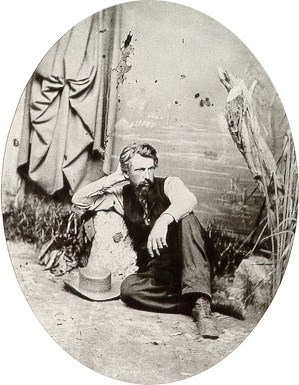
- Portrait of Russell, unknown photographer
- Born: March 20, 1829
- Died: September 22, 1902 (aged 73)
- Occupation: Photographer
- Known for: American Civil War; Union Pacific Railroad

Andrew Joseph Russell (March 20, 1829 – September 22, 1902) was an American photographer of the American Civil War and the Union Pacific Railroad. Russell photographed construction of the Union Pacific (UP) in 1868 and 1869.

== Early life ==
Andrew J. Russell was born March 20, 1829, in Walpole, New Hampshire, as the son of Harriet (née Robinson) and Joseph Russell. He was raised in Nunda, New York. He took an early interest in painting and executed portraits and landscapes for family members and for local public figures.

== The Civil War ==
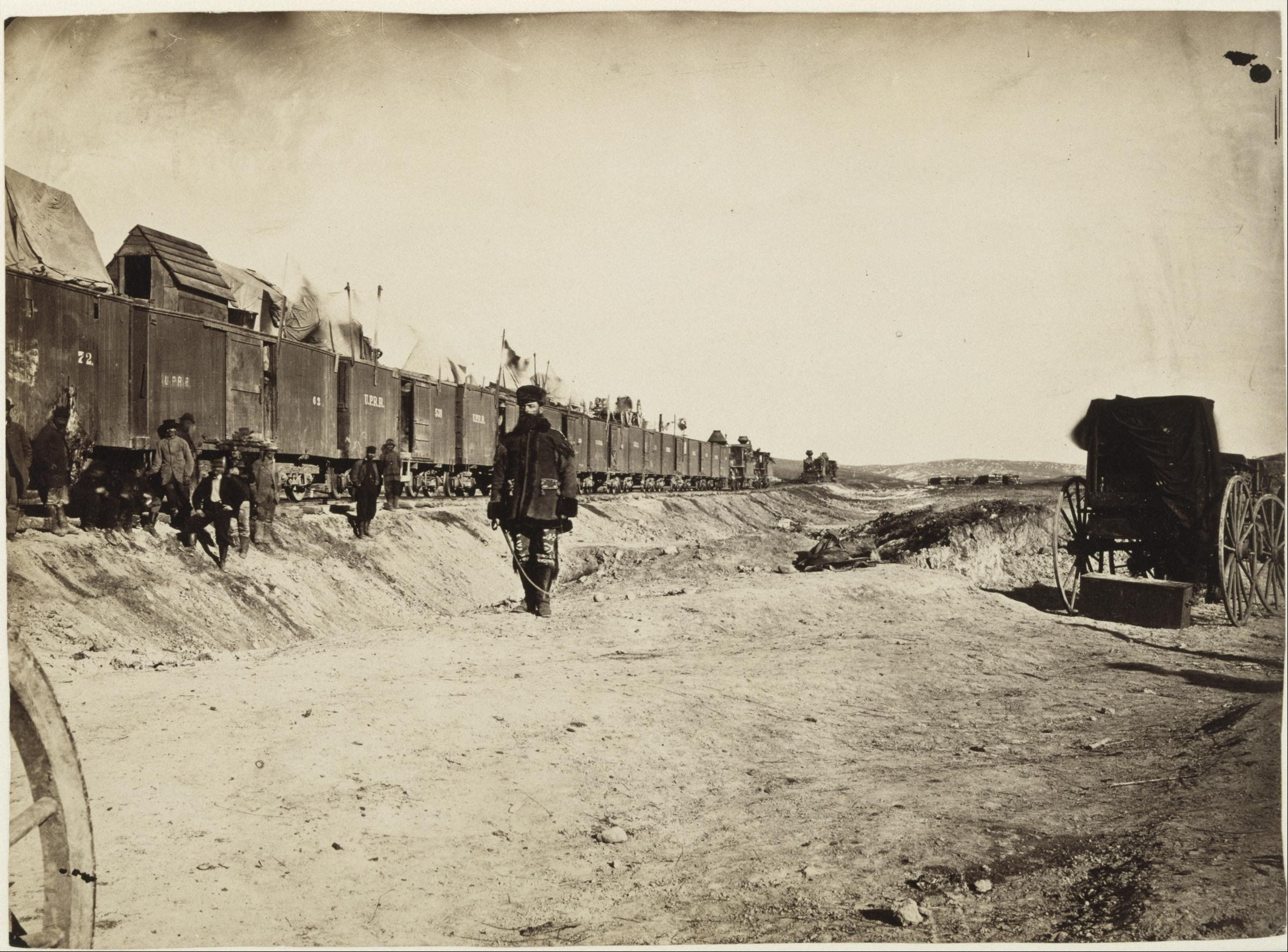
General John S. Casement and His Outfit (1867-8; during construction of the UP Railroad)

During the first two years of the Civil War, Russell painted a diorama used to recruit soldiers for the Union Army. On August 22, 1862, he volunteered at Elmira, New York, mustering in the following month as Captain in Company F, 141st New York Volunteer Regiment. In February 1863, Russell took an interest in photography and paid civilian photographer Egbert Guy Fowx $300 to teach him the collodion wet-plate process. Fowx was a free-lance photographer who worked both for photographer Mathew Brady and for the United States Department of War.

Russell took his first photographs with a camera that he borrowed from Fowx and Colonel Herman Haupt. Haupt used Russell's photographs to illustrate his reports. Haupt arranged to have Russell removed from his regiment on March 1, 1863, so that he could photograph for the United States Military Railroad and the Quartermaster Corps, until he mustered out in September 1865. Russell was the only military officer to photograph for the War Department during the American Civil War. He is perhaps best known for "Confederate dead Behind the Stone Wall" and another photograph stated before taken during the Battle of Chancellorsville on May 3, 1863.

== Transcontinental Railroad ==
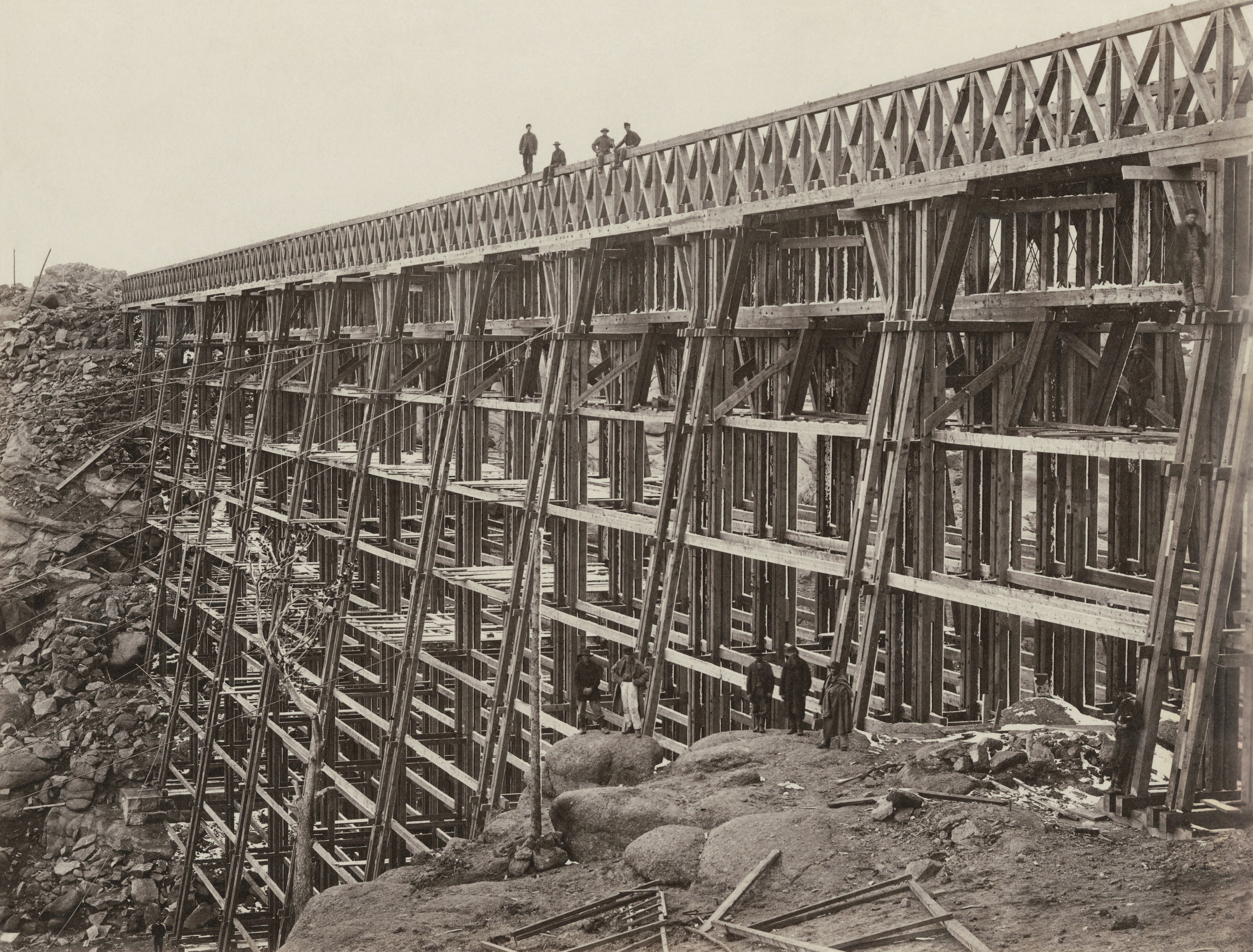
The Dale Creek Crossing under construction.

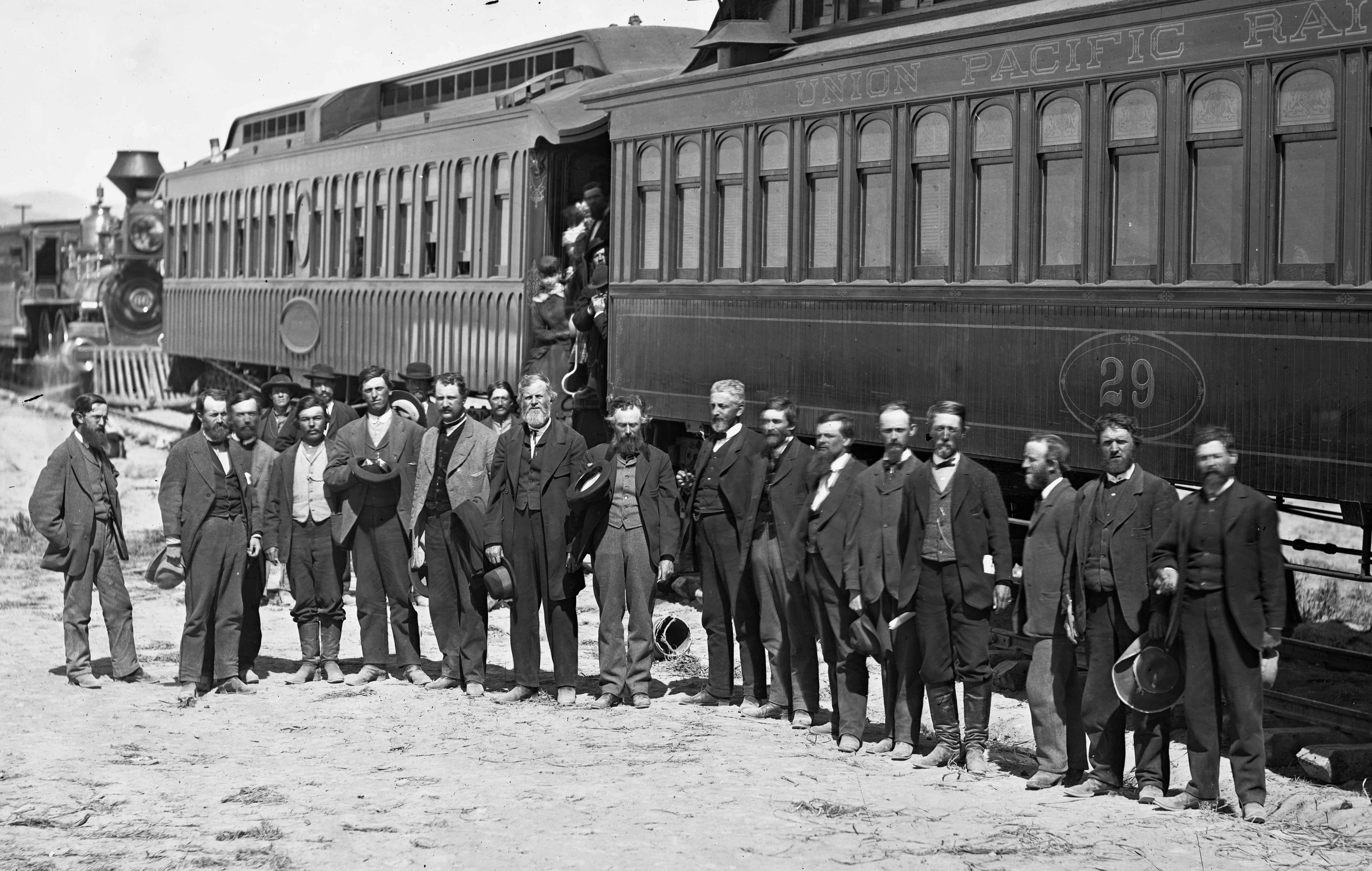
Russell photograph of the "Engineers of U.P.R.R. at the Laying of Last Rail Promentory"

The ceremony for the driving of the golden spike at Promontory Summit, Utah, on May 10, 1869.

Russell photographed the construction of the Union Pacific Railroad in Wyoming and Utah Territories during 1868, as their official photographer. He published these photographs in numerous forms, including as an album with 50 tipped in albumen prints and accompanying text: The Great West Illustrated in a Series of Photographic Views Across the Continent Taken Along the Line of the Union Pacific Railroad, West from Omaha, Nebraska. With an Annotated Table of Contents, Giving a Brief Description of Each View; Its Peculiarities, Characteristics, and Connection with the Different Points on the Road. His training as a painter provided the foundation for this series of views, which laid out the promise of the western landscape. While some of the images were truly romantic evocations of the West, others depicted construction sites or inhospitable landscapes; only the captions could remind viewers of the "finest trout" in the rivers or the "luxurious growth of grass, wild rye, barley" that might feed future inhabitants. This album, like others of its time, perpetuated the notion of Manifest Destiny, and the accompanying erasure of Native American presence; Native Americans do not appear in this album, which viewed the West as a "tabula rasa" upon with the country's future could be built.

In 1869 he returned to Utah Territory to photograph the completion of the First transcontinental railroad, or "golden spike" on May 10, 1869, at Promontory Summit, Utah Territory. for this work, Russell used his single-view camera. Russell took five group portraits that day, at least two were "...sent to New York as news pictures and arrived in time to be copied by engravers for the front page of the June 5 issue of Leslie's Illustrated Newspaper." These photographs and others have value today "... principally as sources for the identification of persons." One photograph shows a rank of sixteen men under the title "Engineers of U.P.R.R. at the Laying of Last Rail Promentory (sic)." This famous photograph of the meeting of the rails, celebrated the joining of East and West, the reduction of a perilous 6 month wagon journey across the US to one that would take a mere 6 days, yet did not include any of the 11,000 Chinese laborers who had laid the tracks across the Sierra Nevada and the desert and into Utah.

This ceremony marked the end of Russell's tenure as the official photographer of the Union Pacific railroad, a position he had taken after filling the same post for the Union Army during the Civil War. By 1869 he had in fact

"...labored for nearly two years to produce over 200 full plate (10" x 13") images and over 500 stereo cards. In general, Russell's work partook in the company's general effort to heroicize its own undertaking — an early form of advertising."

Later that year he traveled to California to photograph locations on the Central Pacific Railroad and returned to New York City at the end of 1869.

== Later career ==
In New York, Russell established a design studio and worked as a photojournalist for Frank Leslie's Illustrated Newspaper through the early 1890s.

== Personal life ==
On October 17, 1850, Russell married Catherine Adelia Duryee, daughter of Lanah (née Conklin) and William Reynex Duryee. They had two daughters, Cora Phillips and Harriet M. Russell. Russell's fragmented family life is evidenced by the fact that he does not appear with them on any census record, save in 1860. His wife and daughters made their home in Minnesota and Illinois. Russell lived on Logan Street in Brooklyn, New York, where he died, September 22, 1902.
