= Charles Epstein =

Charles Epstein may refer to:

- Charles Epstein (mathematician), American mathematician
- Charles Epstein (geneticist), American geneticist
