= Oric Bates =

American archaeologist and author

Oric Bates (5 December 1883 – 1918) was an American archaeologist and author. Bates worked at multiple institutions including the Boston Museum of Fine Arts where he served as the director of the Egyptian Department and the Peabody Museum of Archaeology and Ethnography where he was a curator in African ethnology. Notable works by Bates include "The Eastern Libyans," "A Madcap Cruise," and Siwan Superstitions." Bates also led expeditions in Libya and Sudan.

== Early life ==
Bates was born on December 5, 1883, in Boston, Massachusetts. Bates was the son of Harriet Bates and Arlo Bates.

== Career ==
Bates graduated from Harvard University in 1905. Following this he served as the director of the Egyptian department at the Boston Museum of Fine Arts. Bates later joined an expedition to northern Sudan involving the Khedival government, the Harvard Syrian expedition, and the Harvard University Museum of Fine Arts Egyptian expedition.

In 1909 Bates led the Tripoli expedition which explored the Libyan Desert. Following this, he led an expedition of Sudan before returning to research in the Libyan Desert. His work appeared in The Atlantic.

In 1914 Bates was appointed curator of African Ethnography at the Peabody Museum of Archaeology and Ethnography, where he also taught courses. Bates also served in the United States Armed Forces as part of the 12th Observation Battery, Section 6. His papers are held at Harvard Library.

== Death ==
Bates died from pneumonia on October 8, 1918, at Camp Zachary Taylor in Louisville, Kentucky.

== Bibliography ==
- A Madcap Cruise (1905)
- Siwan Superstitions (1911)
- History of the Eastern Libyans (1912)
- The Eastern Libyans (1914)
- Ethnographic Notes from Marsa Matruh (1915)
- Ancient Egyptian Fishing (1917)
- Sîwan Pottery (1918)

- ""Sculptures from the Excavations at Giza, 1905–1906"". Bulletin of the Museum of Fine Arts, Boston. 5 (26): 20–21. June 1907.
