= United States Military Railroad =

Union military unit during the American Civil War

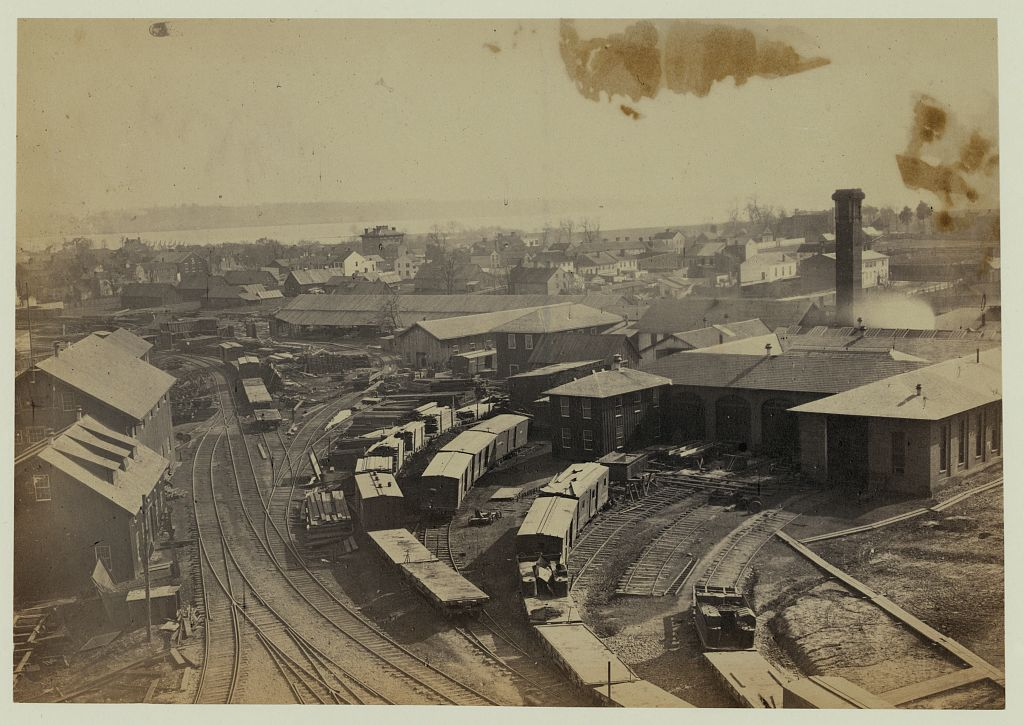
- Orange & Alexandria Railroad rail yard in Alexandria, Virginia
- Active: February 1862 – 1865
- Country: United States of America
- Branch: United States Army
- Type: Transportation
- Role: Strategic movement, operational resupply
- Nickname: "USMRR"

Commanders
- Notable commanders: Daniel McCallum; Herman Haupt

The U.S. Military Railroad (USMRR) was established by the United States War Department as a separate agency to operate any rail lines seized by the government during the American Civil War. An Act of Congress of 31 January 1862 authorized President Abraham Lincoln to seize control of the railroads and telegraph for military use in January 1862. In practice, however, the USMRR restricted its authority to Southern rail lines captured in the course of the war. As a separate organization for rail transportation, the USMRR is one of the predecessors of the modern United States Army Transportation Corps.

== History ==
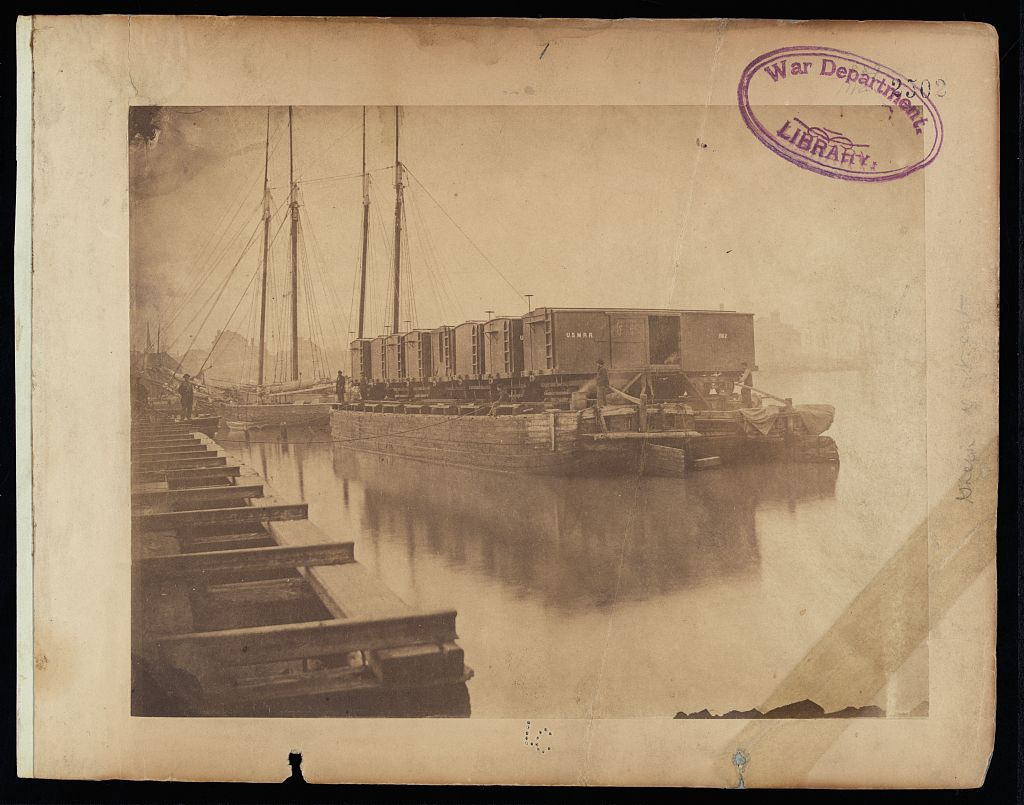
Transportation on the Potomac. Cars loaded at Alexandria can be carried on barges or arks to Aquia Creek, and sent to stations where the Army of the Potomac is supplied, without break of bulk.

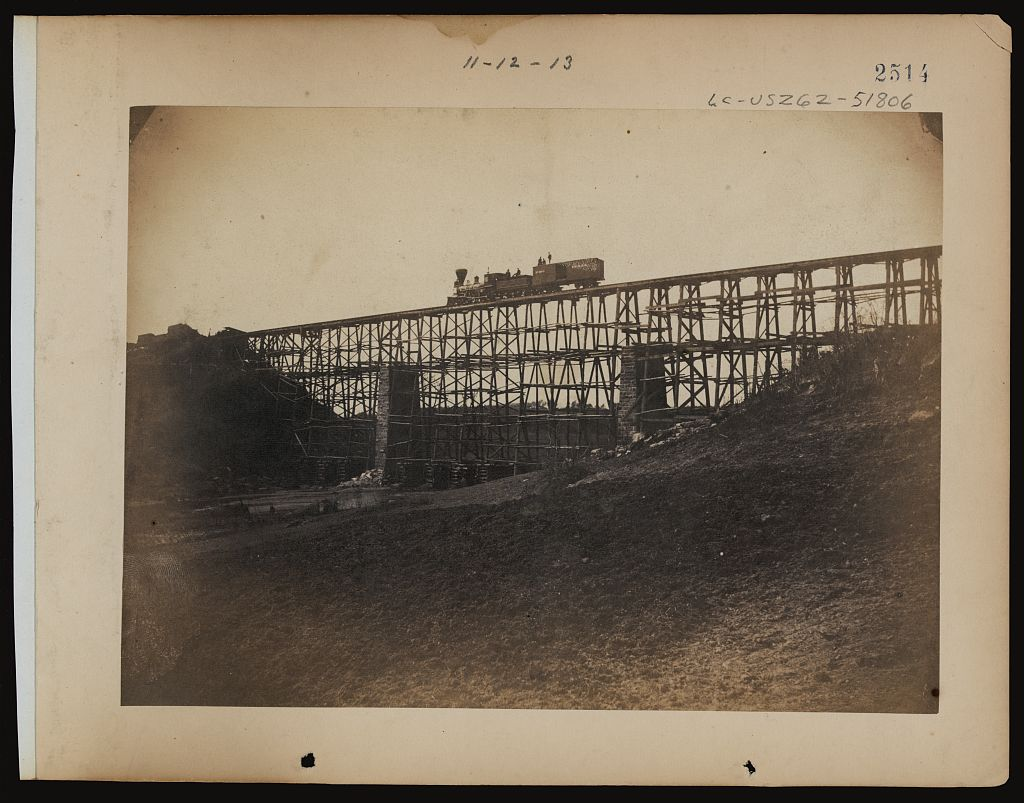
Military railroad bridge across Potomac Creek, on the Fredericksburg Railroad

The American Civil War was the first war where railroads were a significant factor in moving troops and supplying forces in the field. The United States Military Railroad organization was established to coordinate this new capability for the Union Army. The USMRR organization benefited from the appointment of experienced railroad men from the private sector. Thomas A. Scott, vice-president of the Pennsylvania Railroad (PRR), served as an Assistant Secretary of War during the period 1861–1862. In January 1862 Scott prepared a report on military transportation that anticipated the creation of the USMRR. Daniel C. McCallum, former general superintendent of the New York and Erie Railroad, was appointed as Military Director and Superintendent of U.S. Railroads. Herman Haupt, former chief engineer of the PRR, was appointed as Chief of Construction and Transportation in the Virginia theater. The departments in the USMRR tended to operate autonomously, although micromanagement from the Secretary of War and overlapping authority between departments did affect their operations. Over time the USMRR would buy, build or capture 419 locomotives and 6,330 cars beyond the rolling stock that was requisitioned from the various Northern railroads. When Col. McCallum was first appointed the USMRR system consisted only of 7 miles of the Washington and Alexandria Railroad; however, by war's end the USMRR exercised control over a network of more than 2,000 miles of military railroads and captured Southern rail lines.

=== Northern Virginia: 1862 ===
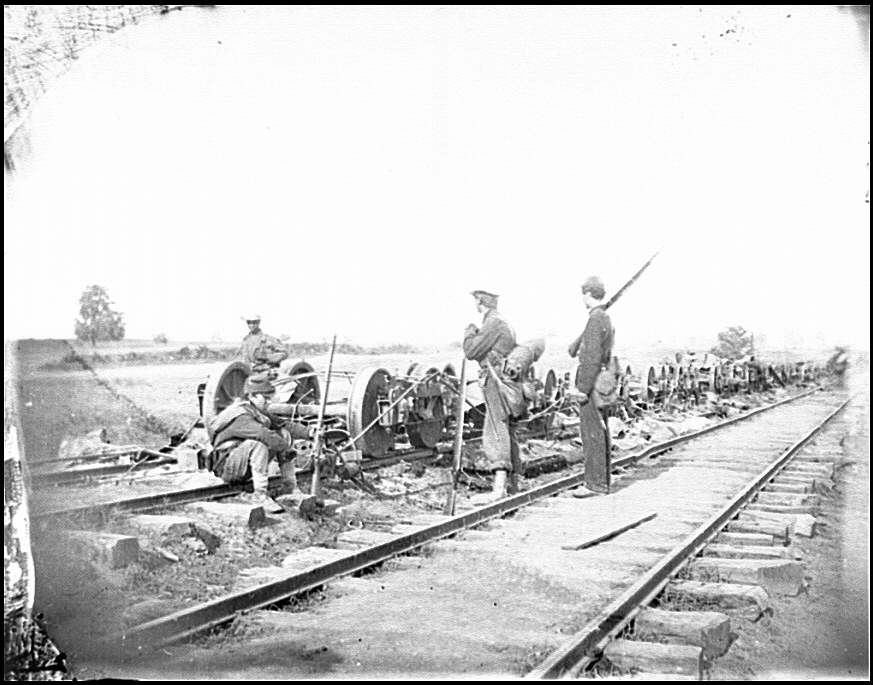
Union soldiers survey wreckage on the Orange & Alexandria Railroad.

The Virginia Central Railroad and Orange and Alexandria Railroad were the principal supply lines for the Confederate and Union forces, respectively.

=== Chattanooga Campaign ===
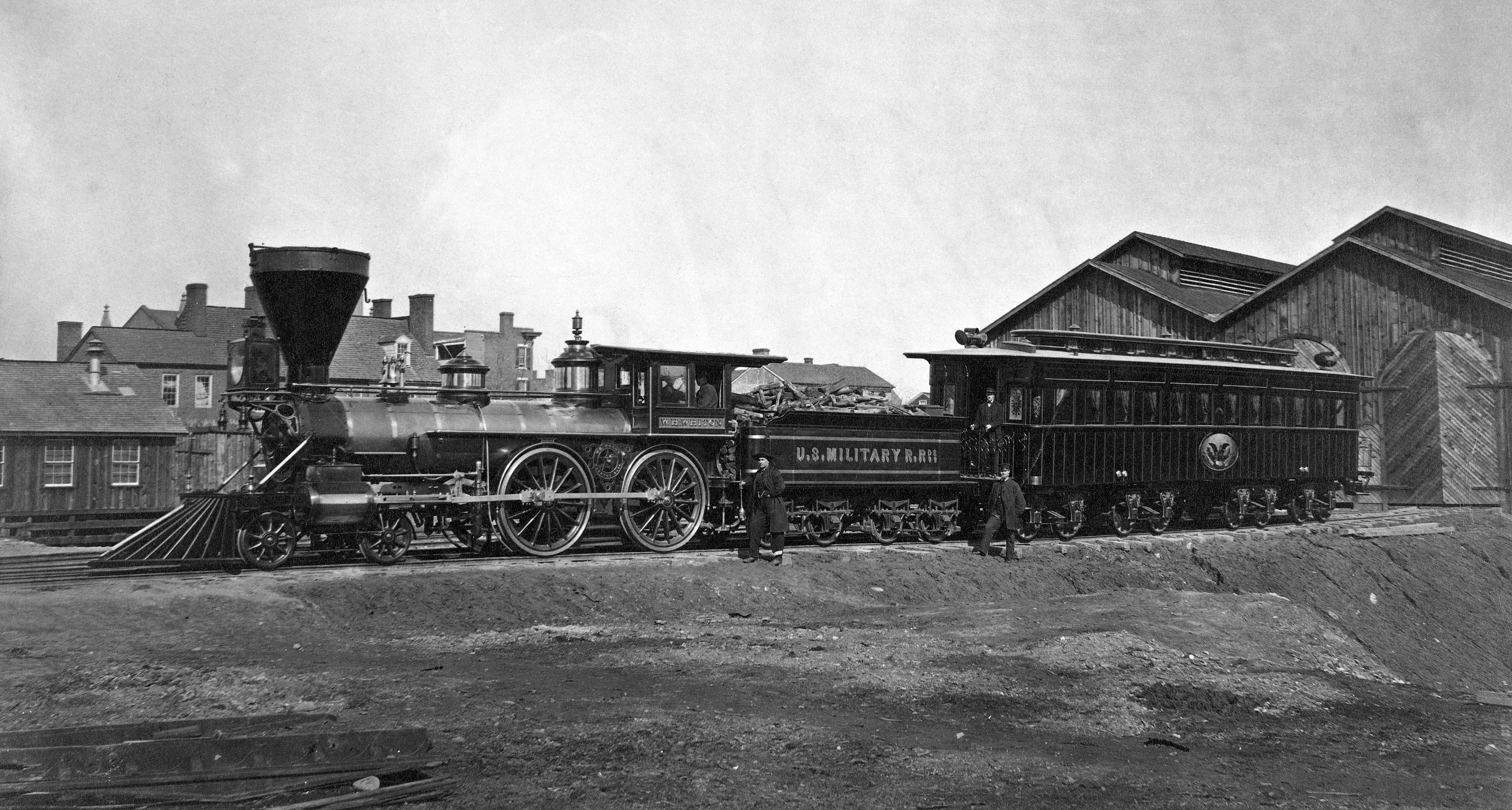
United States Military Railroad 4-4-0 locomotive W.H. Whiton (built by William Mason in 1862) in January 1865 with Abraham Lincoln's presidential car, which later was used as his funeral car.

In the fall of 1863 the Confederate railroads, acting as interior lines of communication, transferred two divisions and an artillery battalion of Lieutenant General James Longstreet’s I Corps, Army of Northern Virginia, by railroad from Virginia to Georgia to reinforce General Braxton Bragg’s Army of Tennessee. The troops began arriving at the Catoosa Platform, Georgia on September 19, having begun their journey from Virginia on September 9. Ultimately, only five of Longstreet’s ten infantry brigades arrived in time to participate in the Confederate victory at Chickamauga. Following their defeat, the troops of MG William Rosecrans’ Army of the Cumberland fell back to Chattanooga, Tennessee where they were surrounded by the Confederates who occupied the heights surrounding the town.

On the evening of September 23, 1863, Secretary of War Edwin Stanton convened a meeting with President Lincoln, Major General Henry Halleck, Secretary of State William Seward and Treasury Secretary Salmon Chase to review plans to reinforce and relieve the Army of the Cumberland with troops from other Union departments. Major General William T. Sherman, with 4 divisions of the Army of the Tennessee, was already moving east from the vicinity of Vicksburg, Mississippi and expected to arrive in about 10 days. Stanton proposed that reinforcements be sent from the then idle Army of the Potomac, his initial recommendation was to move 30,000 troops in just five days to the vicinity of Bridgeport, Alabama. Much debate surrounded the proposal. Halleck opined that such a movement would require at least 40 days and even the President doubted that the troops could reach Washington in five days. Daniel McCallum of the USMRR was summoned to the meeting and given a basic outline of the plan. After making some quick calculations McCallum declared that the proposed operation could be completed within seven days. The President ultimately gave the order to begin the transfer of troops from the Army of the Potomac to the west, starting the largest troop rail movement of the war. In 12 days the USMRR moved approximately 25,000 men over 1,200 miles overshadowing the Confederacy's earlier movement of 12,000 men over 800 miles in 12 days.

On September 24 the men summoned to plan the rail movement arrived in Washington to work out the details. Secretary Stanton telegraphed them asking for their assistance even before the President approved the plan: John W. Garrett, President of the Baltimore and Ohio Railroad (B&O); Thomas Scott of the PRR; S. M. Felton, President of the Philadelphia, Wilmington and Baltimore Railroad; William P. Smith, Master of Transportation for the B&O; and McCallum. The men at the conference worked out the detailed route planning, a task complicated by the different gauges of railroad track in use at the time. The initial movement of troops from Virginia was allocated to the USMRR under McCallum's direction. Garrett and Smith would supervise the movement from Washington, D.C. to Jeffersonville, Indiana, and Scott would travel west to supervise the move from Louisville, Kentucky, to Bridgeport, Alabama. As finally settled, the movement involved 9 different railroads in order get the troops from Virginia to Bridgeport. The USMRR, operating on the Orange and Alexandria Railroad from Bealeton, Virginia to Washington, passed the movement off to the B&O from Washington to Benwood, West Virginia. At Benwood, the troops crossed the Ohio River via a pontoon bridge and boarded Central Ohio Railroad trains to move from Bellaire, Ohio to Columbus. From Columbus, troops moved via the Columbus and Xenia Railroad, Little Miami Railroad, and the Indiana Central Railroad to reach Indianapolis, Indiana. From Indianapolis the route used the Jeffersonville Railroad to return to the Ohio River. The troops crossed the Ohio River to Louisville and boarded trains using the tracks of the Louisville and Nashville Railroad to reach Nashville, Tennessee. From Nashville the final leg of the trip used the Nashville and Chattanooga Railroad to deliver the troops to Bridgeport.

While the railroad men planned the movement of reinforcements to the west, Halleck began issuing the orders that assigned actual units to the move. Major General Joseph Hooker, former commander of the Army of the Potomac, was assigned to command the eastern reinforcements. Major General George Meade, the commander of the Army of the Potomac, was directed to prepare the XI and XII Corps for movement beginning September 25. At the time the XII Corps’ two divisions were on picket duty along the Rappahannock River and had to be relieved by the I Corps before it could move to the railroad. The XI Corps’ remaining two divisions were deployed to the army's rear guarding the Orange and Alexandria railroad which simplified their preparations to move. Meade initially ordered the XII Corps to march to Brandy Station, but the corps was directed to march 10 miles further up the railroad to Bealeton where there were better arrangements for loading the trains. McCallum directed the XI Corps infantry to move to Manassas Junction, Virginia, to board trains, but had the corps’ artillery march to Alexandria, where the best facilities to load the guns were located.

By the end of operations on September 25, 1863, 5,800 of the 7,500 soldiers in the XI Corps were on trains headed for Bridgeport. By the morning of September 27, 12,600 men, 33 cars of artillery and 21 cars of baggage and horses were in motion. By 10:30 PM September 30, the first four trains of troops reached Bridgeport. By October 3 Major General Hooker was able to report that all of the XI Corps’ troops were at Bridgeport and the XII Corps was passing through Nashville to begin the final leg of the trip. Moving the troops and artillery did not complete the job. On September 27 the railroads began loading the camp baggage, wagons, ambulances, horses and mule teams that were part of the corps. The XI Corps had 261 six-mule teams, 75 two-horse ambulances and 3 spring wagons, and the XII Corps needed 150 four-horse teams and 156 six-mule teams moved. The last regiment of troops passed through Indianapolis on October 6 and reached its destination October 8, 1863, ending the 1,233-mile troop movement. By October 12, the USMRR and civilian railroads completed the movement of both corps and all of their artillery, transportation, and baggage. From Bridgeport, Hooker marched his force towards Chattanooga to participate in the fighting to relieve the Army of the Cumberland.

=== Atlanta Campaign ===
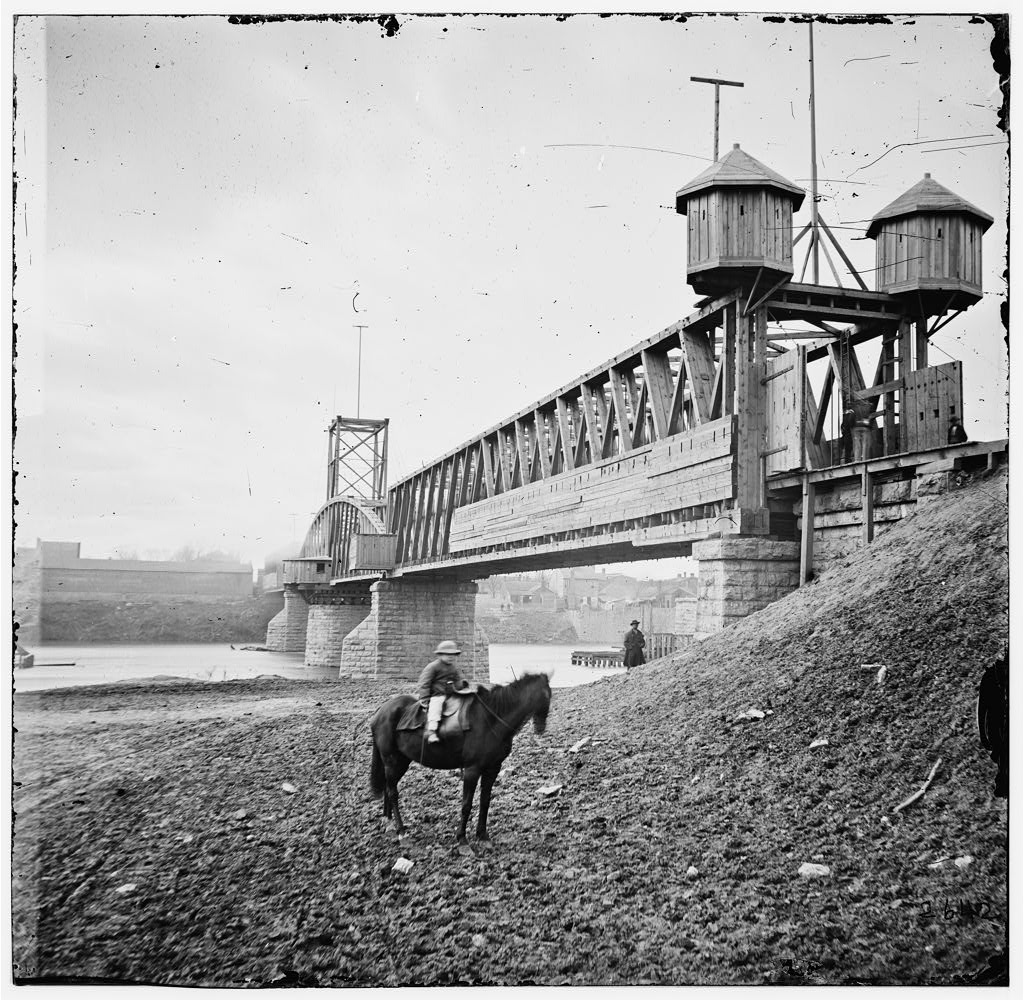
Nashville, Tenn. Fortified railroad bridge across Cumberland River

=== Petersburg Campaign ===
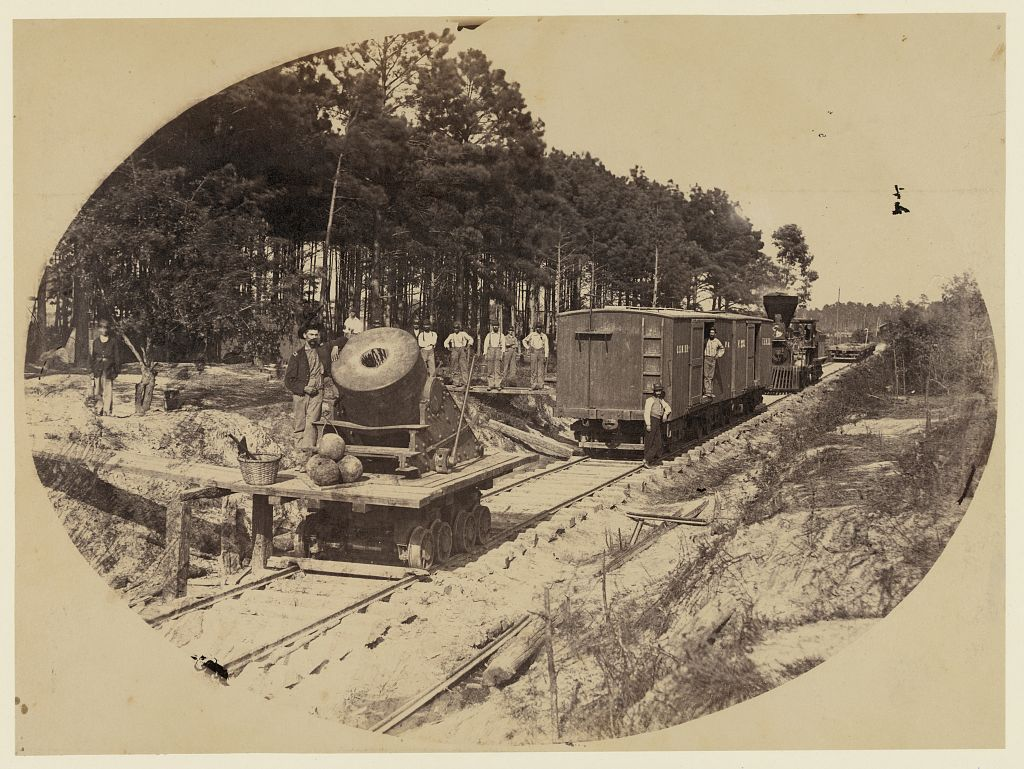
Railroad mortar at Petersburg, Va., July 25, 1864

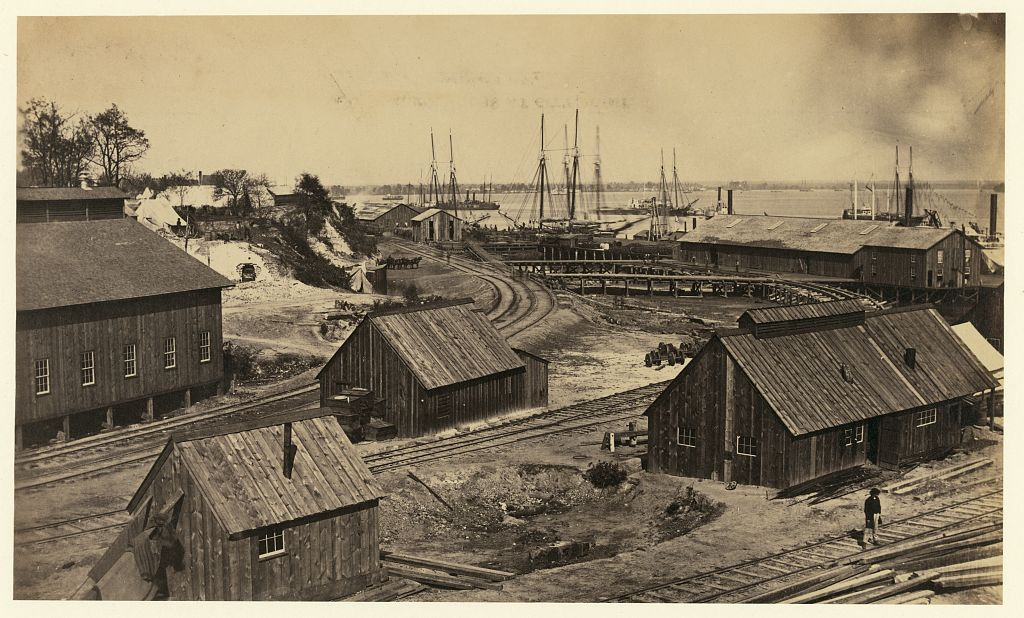
City Point US Military Railroad Depot, looking towards the James River.

At the conclusion of the Overland Campaign in 1864, Lt. General Grant directed Major General Meade to transfer his Army of the Potomac to the south side of the James River in effort to capture the Confederate rail center of Petersburg and sever Richmond’s supply lines. The Union did not capture Petersburg before the city's defenders were reinforced by troops from General Lee's Army of Northern Virginia. The continual Union movement towards the Confederate flanks gave way to digging as siege operations to isolate the Confederate capital began in earnest.

Grant established his headquarters on the grounds of Appomattox Manor overlooking the confluence of the Appomattox and James rivers. City Point, Virginia, modern day Hopewell, became the principal logistical base for the Virginia theater supplying the troops of both Meade's Army of the Potomac and Major General Benjamin Butler’s Army of the James. In all the United States Military Railroad supplied more than 100,000 troops and more than 65,000 horses and mules with food, equipment and supplies from the waterfront docks on the navigable portion of the James River at City Point.

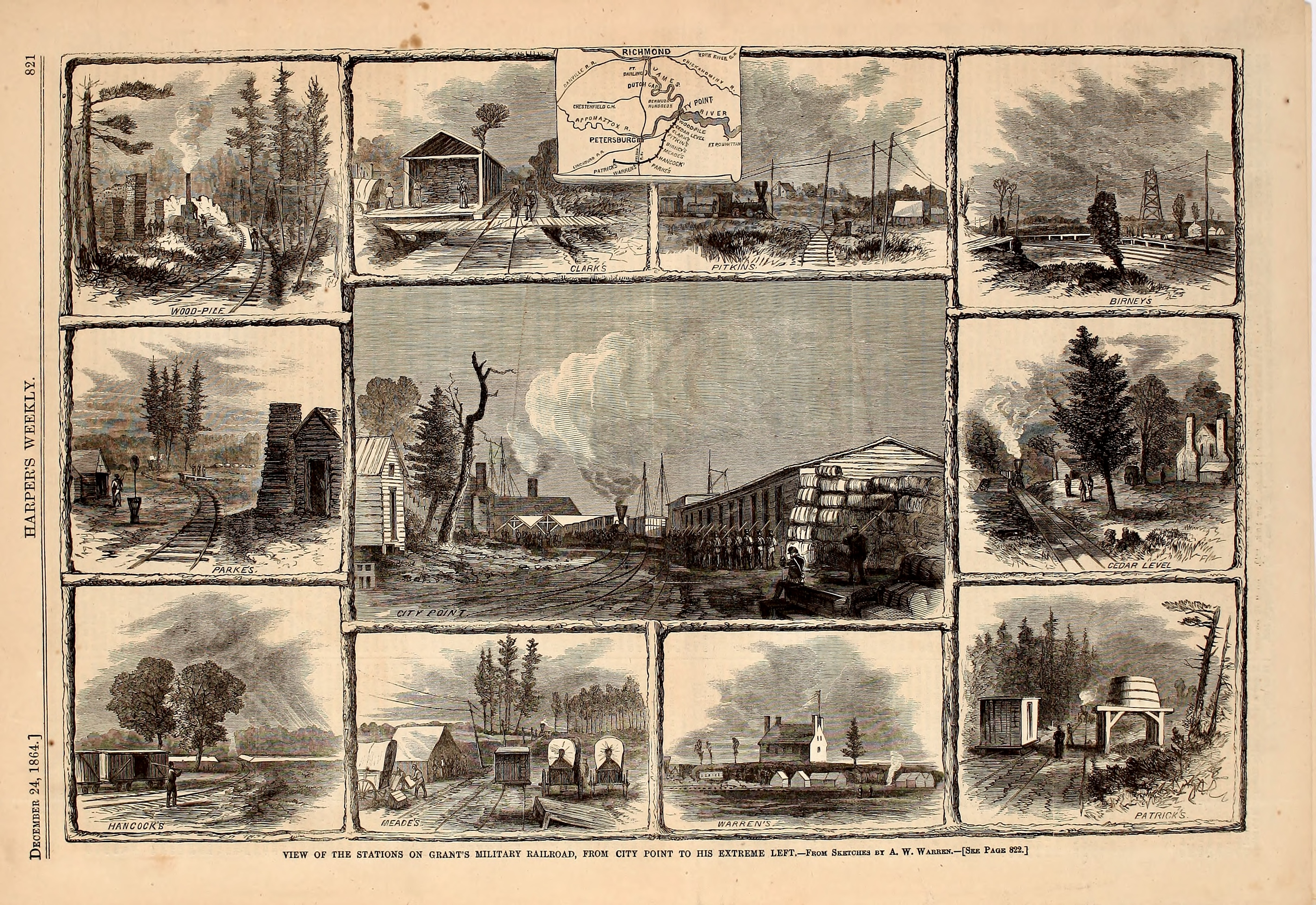
"Views of the stations of Grant's military railroad from city point to his extreme left—from sketches by A. W. Warren" (Harper's Weekly, December 24, 1864)

Initial railroad operations began when the USMRR rebuilt and restored service along 9 miles of the Petersburg and City Point Railroad’s line. As the Union Army steadily extended its siege lines to the south and west, the USMRR construction corps followed in the Army's wake extending rail service from City Point to positions behind the new Union left flank. Eventually the USMRR added 21 additional miles of track which partially encircled Petersburg from the east to the southwest. Parts of the USMRR extension are preserved today within the borders of Fort Gregg-Adams, Virginia, where a series of four historic markers show the route that the railroad followed behind the Union lines. When Petersburg was eventually abandoned in 1865 the 25 engines and 275 pieces of other rolling stock had logged a grand total of 2,300,000 operating miles.

== Commanders ==
- Brevet Major General Daniel McCallum
- Herman Haupt (construction)

== See also ==
- United States Railroad Administration
