= George L. Vose =

American railroad engineer 1831–1910

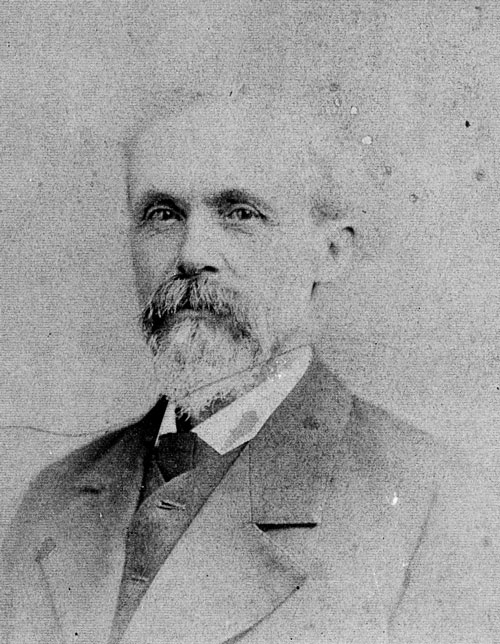
- Born: George Leonard Vose; April 19, 1831; Augusta, Maine, US
- Died: March 30, 1910 (aged 78); Brunswick, Maine, US
- Education: Harvard John A. Paulson School of Engineering and Applied Sciences
- Spouses: Abba Valentine Thompson Vose (m. 1854; died 1870) Charlotte Buxton Andrews (m. 1872; died 1889)
- Children: Mabel Vose; Elizabeth Chandler Vose Torrey; Richard Hampton Vose; Harriet Bates
- Parent: Richard H. Vose
- Engineering career
- Institutions: Bowdoin College; Massachusetts Institute of Technology

George Leonard Vose (19 April 1831 – 30 March 1910) was an American civil engineer and Professor of Civil Engineering at Bowdoin College and Massachusetts Institute of Technology, known as educator in the field of railroads, and from his "Manual for railroad engineers and engineering students" (1873).

== Early life and career ==
George Leonard Vose was born in Augusta, Maine, on April 13, 1831, to Richard Hampton Vose, a politician and Governor of the State of Maine and Harriet Greene Chandler Vose. Vose was educated at home in Salem, Massachusetts. From 1849 to 1850 he studied at the Lawrence Scientific School of Harvard College.

After Harvard, Vose started his career as an assistant engineer on the Kennebec and Portland Railroad, and until 1859 was engaged on various railroads. From 1859 to 1863, he was associate editor of The American Railway Times in Boston, and then for three years, he resided in Salem, Massachusetts. In 1866, he moved to Paris, Maine, and was occupied with railroad projects in Maine and New Hampshire. Vose was a professor of civil engineering in Bowdoin College from 1872 until 1881 and Hayward Professor of Civil and Topographical Engineering as well as department head for civil engineering at the Massachusetts Institute of Technology from 1881 until 1887.

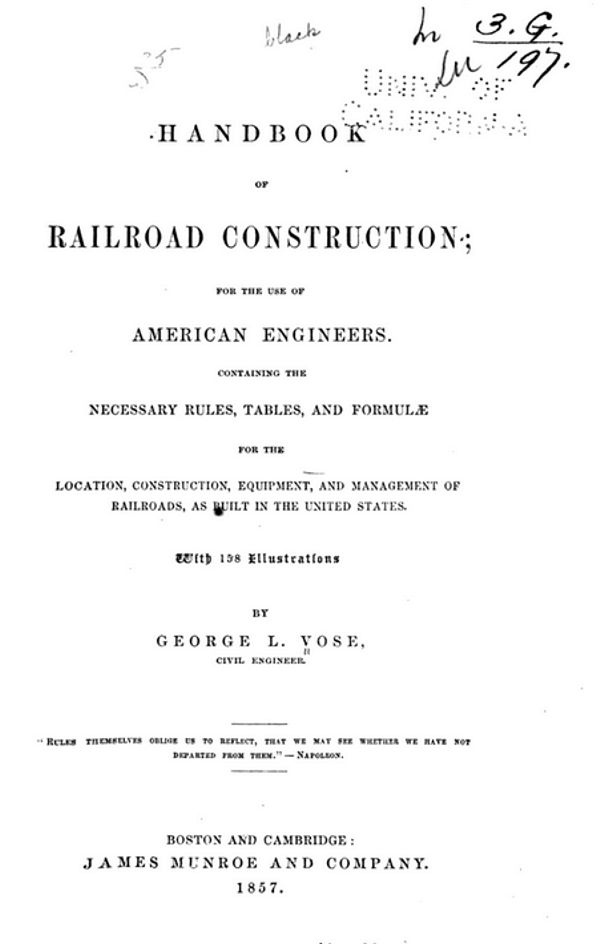
Handbook of Railroad Construction, 1857

In 1854, Vose married Abba Valentine Thompson Vose (1843–1870) and they had four children, Harriet Lenora Vose (1856–1886), Mabel Vose (1859–1888), Elizabeth Chandler Vose Torrey (1863–1901) and Richard Hampton Vose (1866–1957). In 1872, Vose married Charlotte Buxton Andrews (1843–1889). Vose's daughter Harriet married Arlo Bates.

He was elected as a member to the American Philosophical Society in 1870.

== Death and legacy ==
Vose died on March 30, 1910, in Brunswick, Maine. Vose Spur, a subpeak of Mount Carrigain, is named for him.

== Published works ==
=== Handbook of Railroad Construction, 1857 ===
The subtitle of the "Handbook of railroad construction: for the use of American engineers. Containing the necessary rules, tables, and formulæ for the location, construction, equipment, and management of railroads, as built in the United States." already explains the purpose and content of this work. It wants to offer rules, tables, and formulæ for the location, construction, equipment, and management of railroads. In the Preface Vose further explains that:

... the object of this work was to give in the plainest possible manner all instructions, rules, and tables necessary for the location, construction, equipment, and management of railroads.
As a general thing, American engineers are not educated for their business; and when they do possess a knowledge of pure science, they are at a loss how to apply it.
The reader is presumed acquainted with the elements of arithmetic, geometry, algebra, and mechanics; being thus provided, he will, by a perusal of what follows, be enabled to correctly proportion bridges, of wood, stone, and iron; abutments, piers, retaining walls, superstructure, and locomotive engines; and to plan and lay out, execute, and estimate any description of work occurring upon railroads.
As the object has been more to be useful than original, the best engineering writers and experimenters have been consulted; among whom are, — Gauthey, Navier, Vicat, Tredgold, Barlow, Totten, Fairbairn, Hodgkinson, Clark, and Lardner. Also a great number of reports by American civil engineers upon railroad matters.

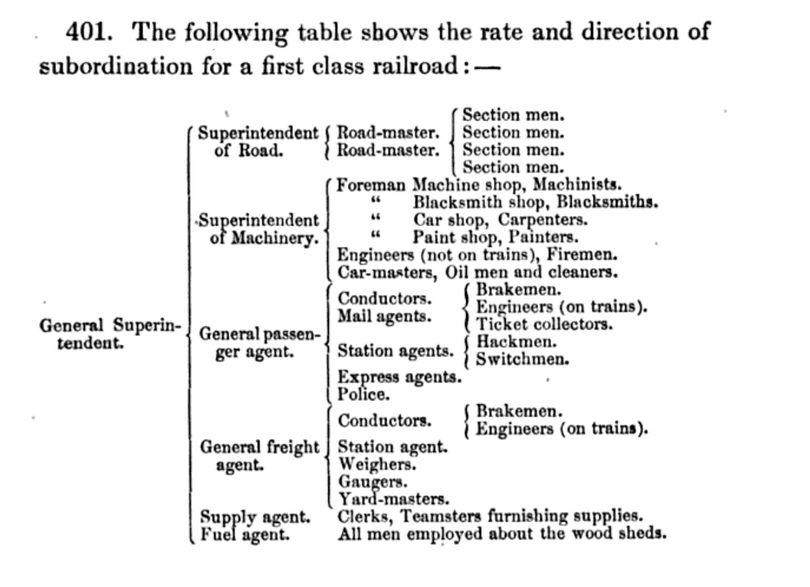
Organization scheme of a railroad, 1857.

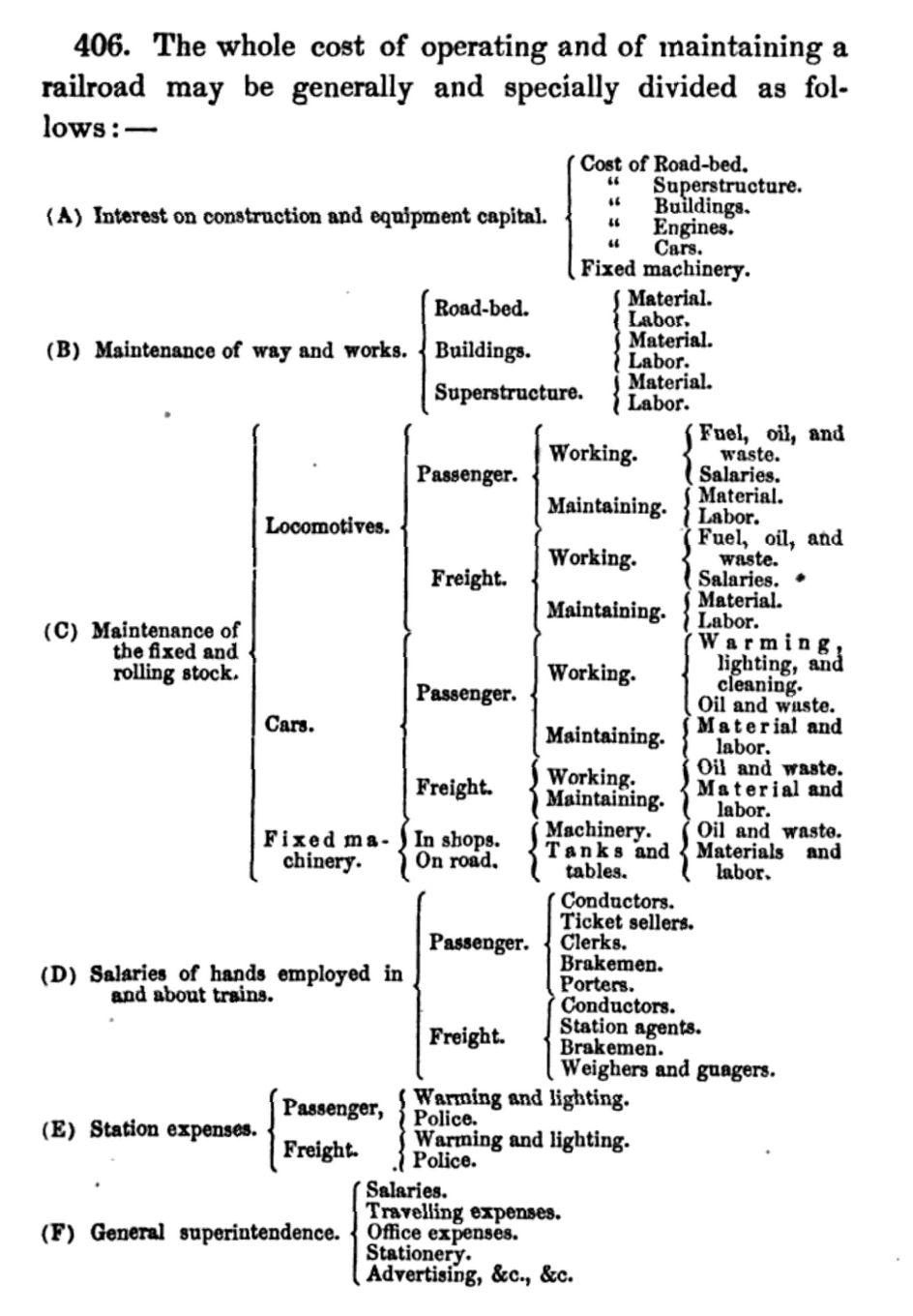
Costs of Operating and Maintaining a Railroad, 1857

Vose further explains that the work is written as "handbook" and not a "treatise", more meant as office companion than as a text-book for students. Fifteen years later he renewed this work, entitled "Manual for railroad engineers and engineering students: containing the rules and tables needed for the location, construction, and equipment of railroads as built in the United States". This work had the similar table of content but was prepared for both railroad engineers and engineering students.

==== Management ====
The last chapter of the 1857 handbook was devoted to management. In there Vose started explaining that railroad management can be divided into two major sections:

- Financial management
- Operating management

The financial management embraces the entire systems of accounts, and relates to everything to:

- Adjusting the tariffs
- The transport of passengers and freight
- Ticket and receiving offices, steamboat, stage, and railroad connections.

The operating or operations management relates to:

- Maintaining the road-bed, superstructure, bridging, masonry, buildings, and fixed stock in working order
- Making all repairs, renewals, enlargements, and alterations
- Purchase, inspection, maintaining, and operating of the rolling stock.

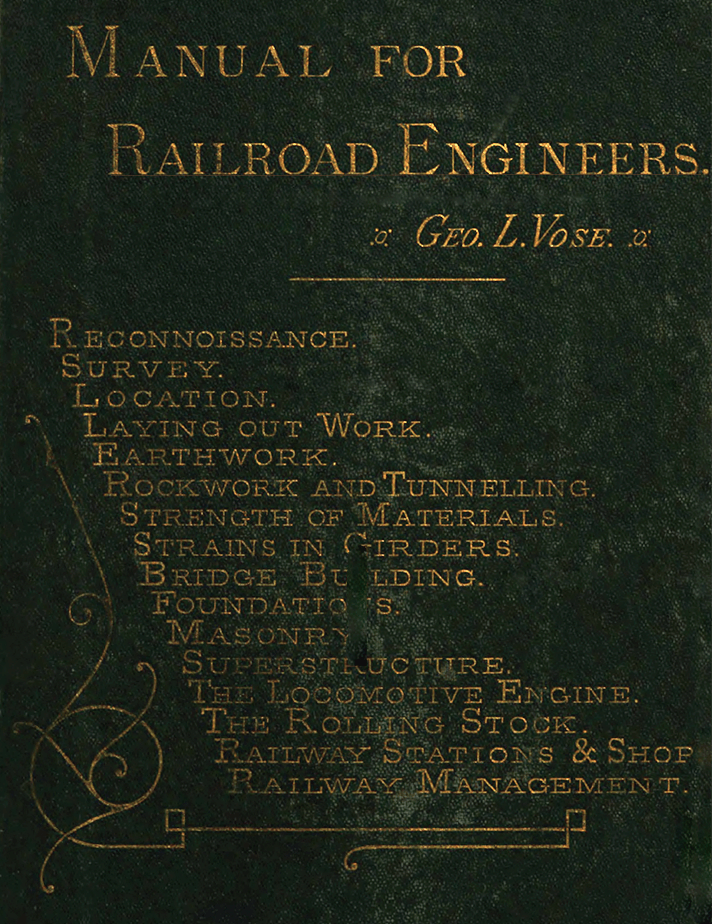
1873 Vose Manual for Railroad Engineers book cover

Vose further goes into the general principles for efficient operation; a part extracted from McCallum (1856). The rate and direction of subordination are presented with a functional organization structure (see image), in which the General Superintendent is in charge. Vose had notified earlier, that financial management does not properly come in his days. And indeed, the financial management function is not incorporated into the organisational structure pictured.

A special feature of the 1857 Handbook, were two classification charts of the organization and the costs of a railroad (see images) given in its last chapter on management. After explaining the duties of employees, the number of trains to be used, and the amount of service of engines, Vose goes into expenses, receipts, and profits. He presents another classification chart of the whole cost of operating and of maintaining a railroad (see image).

== Selected works ==
- Handbook of Railroad Construction (Boston, 1857)
- Orographic Geology, or the Origin and Structure of Mountains (1866)
- Manual for Railroad Engineers and Engineering Students (1873)
- A Graphic Method for solving Algebraic Problems (New York, 1875)
- Elementary Course of Geometric Drawing (Boston, 1878)
- Memoir of George W. Whistler (1887)
- Bridge Disasters in America: the Cause and the Remedy (1887)
