= Harriet Bates =

American poet

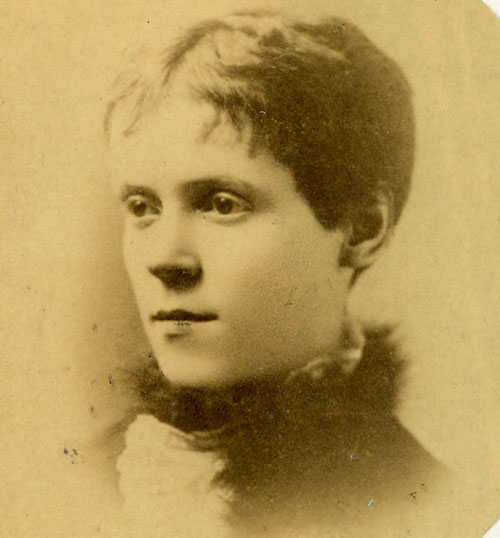
- Born: Harriet Leonora Vose; July 30, 1856; Quincy, Illinois, U.S.
- Died: March 1886 (aged 29); Boston, Massachusetts, U.S.
- Resting place: Harmony Grove Cemetery, Salem, Massachusetts
- Occupation: Author
- Spouse: Arlo Bates (m. 1882)
- Writing career
- Pen name: Eleanor Putnam
- Language: English
- Genres: novels, poetry

Harriet Bates (July 30, 1856 – March 1886) was a 19th-century American novelist and poet. Her pen name, Eleanor Putnam, had been the maiden name of her great-grandmother.

== Early years and education ==
Harriet Leonora Vose was born at Quincy, Illinois, July 30, 1856. She was the eldest daughter of Professor George L. Vose, writer of a number of works on civil and railroad engineering. She went to live in Salem, Massachusetts in 1865, remaining for six years. The family then moved temporarily to the West, in search of health for the mother. In that time, she attended a dame school.

Her literary pseudonym, "Eleanor Putnam," had been the maiden name of her great-grandmother. She began to write in her early youth, and previous to her marriage, had contributed numerous stories to American periodicals.

== Career ==
On September 5, 1882, she married Arlo Bates With him, she wrote Prince Vance (published 1888). In 1885, she began to contribute to the Atlantic Monthly a series of sketches of life in Salem, Massachusetts where much of her childhood had been passed and many of her ancestors had lived. After her death, these were collected and published in a volume edited by her husband. As pictures of life in an ancient New England town, they are unsurpassed for humor, clever character drawing, and delicacy of touch.

She died at her home in Boston, Massachusetts, in March, 1886. After her death, Arlo prepared for the press her sketches, "Old Salem" (1886), and a novel, A Woodland Wooing (1889). In her memory, he wrote "Sonnets in Shadow", which was dedicated to her. Her son was the archaeologist, Oric Bates (1883–1918).

== Selected works ==
- Bob's Breaking in, 1880
- Prince Vance: The Story of a Prince with a Court in His Box, 1888 (with A. Bates)
- A Woodland Wooing, 1889
- Old Salem, 1893
