= John Edgar Thomson =

American civil engineer and industrialist

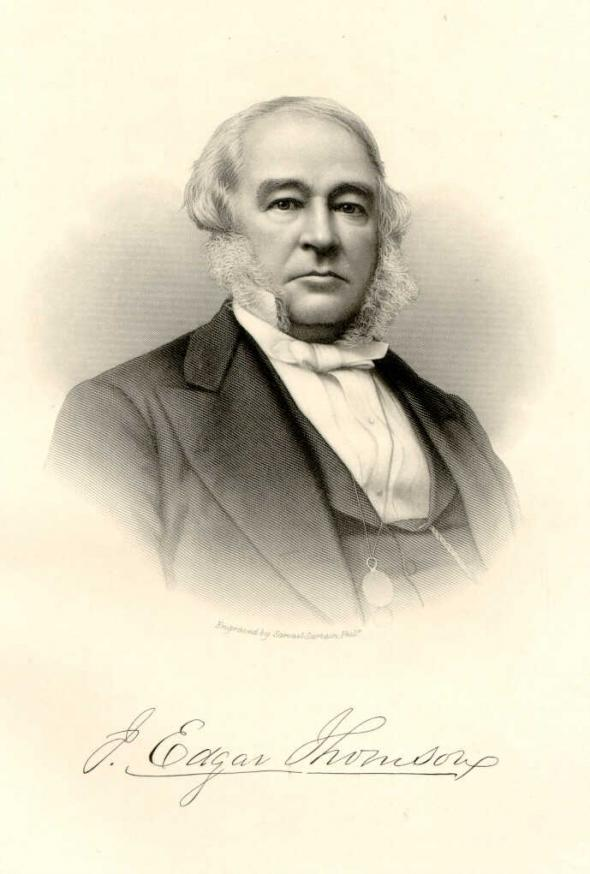
- Born: February 10, 1808; Springfield Township, Pennsylvania, U.S.
- Died: May 27, 1874 (aged 66); Philadelphia, Pennsylvania, U.S.
- Occupations: Civil engineer, financier, philanthropist
- Known for: Chief engineer and third president of the Pennsylvania Railroad
- Spouse: Lavinia Frances Smith (m. 1854)

John Edgar Thomson (February 10, 1808 – May 27, 1874) was an American civil engineer and industrialist. An entrepreneur best known for his leadership of the Pennsylvania Railroad (PRR) from 1852 until his death in 1874, Thomson made it the largest business enterprise in the world and a world-class model for technological and managerial innovation. Previously the railroad's first chief engineer, he became its third president.

His sober, technical, methodical, and non-ideological personality had an important influence on the Pennsylvania Railroad, which in the mid-19th century was on the technical cutting edge of rail development. The railroad was known for its conservatism and steady growth while avoiding financial risks. His Pennsylvania Railroad became the largest railroad in the world, with 6000 miles of track, and was notable for generating steady financial dividends, for high-quality construction, constantly improving equipment, technological advances (such as replacing wood with coal as locomotive fuel), and innovation in management techniques for a large complex organization.

== Childhood and early career ==
John Edgar Thomson was born in 1808 in Springfield Township, Delaware County, Pennsylvania, near Philadelphia, to a family with Quaker roots whose immigrant ancestors had arrived in the colonial era. His father John Thomson was a leading civil engineer, who helped build the Chesapeake and Delaware Canal and the first experimental railroad in the United States. The son had little formal schooling, as was typical of the time. He worked closely with his father from an early age, acquiring a sound foundation of engineering practice which he augmented by reading, observation, and experience.

Thomson began his railroad career at age 19 as a rodman working in a survey crew locating the Philadelphia and Columbia Railroad; later he worked for Camden and Amboy Railroad. In 1832 he sailed to Great Britain, making an inspection tour of the new railways constructed in the country. Through his father's influence, he became a member of Pennsylvania state's engineer corps, surveying routes for a rail line west from Philadelphia. He was soon promoted to assistant engineer, and in 1830, when the line of the Camden & Amboy Railroad was located across the state of New Jersey, Thomson was placed in charge of an engineering division.

== Career ==
At the age of 26 in 1834, Thomson was hired as the chief engineer of the newly chartered Georgia Railroad. He located the road, negotiated and oversaw construction contracts, operated portions as they opened, and promoted possible connections to the north and west. Thomson became nationally known for his expertise; his salary was $4000 in 1837.

By 1845, he had completed the railroad from Augusta to Marthasville (present-day Atlanta). At 173 miles (278.4 km), it was the longest railroad in the world at the time. Thomson later bought control of the Montgomery and West Point Railroad and helped finance and locate the Nashville and Chattanooga Railroad. Also in 1845, he surveyed and designed the Augusta Canal for lawyer Henry Cumming; it was completed two years later.

=== Pennsylvania Railroad ===
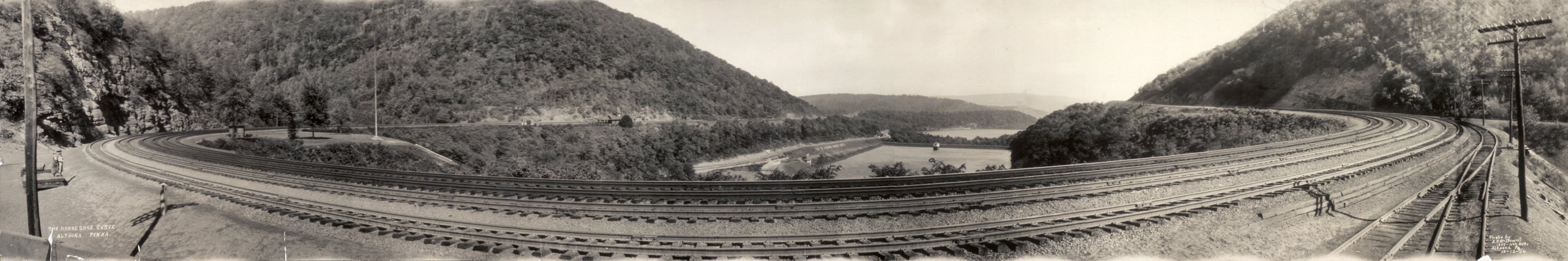
Thomson and Herman Haupt designed the Horseshoe Curve in the Allegheny Mountains of Western Pennsylvania, which opened in 1854.

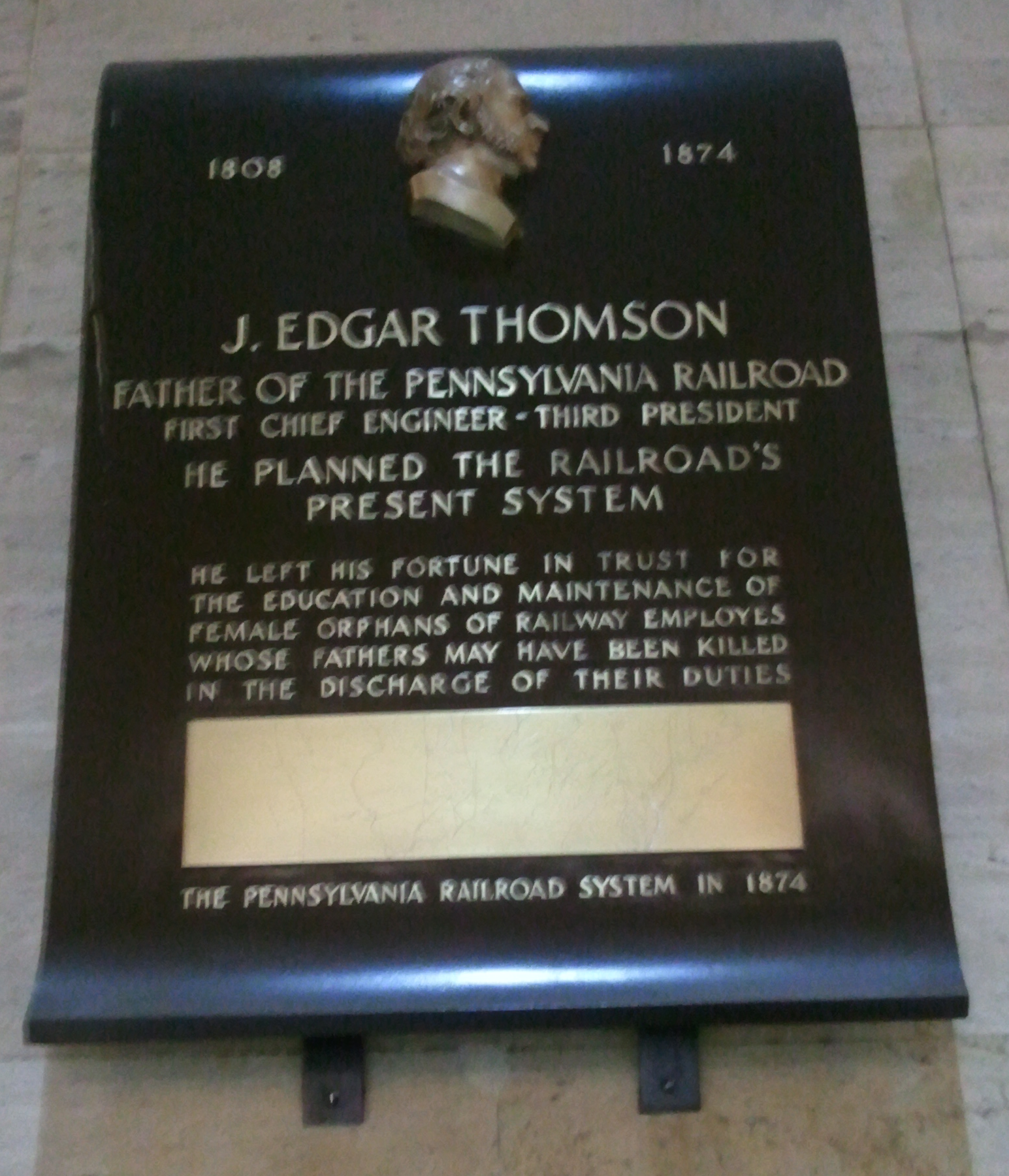
A plaque commemorating Thomson in 30th Street Station, a former Pennsylvania Railroad station in Philadelphia

The state of Pennsylvania invested extensively in state-owned canals and short-line railroads, but they were neither profitable nor efficient, and the state was falling behind its rivals in infrastructure development, which it believed was critical for economic growth. Pennsylvania Railroad, also known by the acronym PRR, incorporated in 1847, built a line across the Allegheny Mountains from the state capital in Harrisburg, Pennsylvania west to Pittsburgh, to eliminate the inefficient Allegheny Portage Railroad and the slow-paced canals. The line would give Philadelphia a link to the fast-growing west, allowing it to compete with Baltimore, which was served by the Baltimore and Ohio Railroad, and New York City.

The company appointed Thomson as chief engineer at a salary of $5000 a year. He sought out the best routes, making allowances for grades and river crossings. With Herman Haupt, he co-designed what became famous as "Horseshoe Curve" and built a railroad with practicable grades. He switched the fuel from wood to coal for the locomotives; other lines followed suit, thus opening up a new demand for coal, which the PRR shipped to all railroads. The through line between Philadelphia and Pittsburgh opened for traffic in February 1854, and made Philadelphia a major outlet for long-haul traffic from the west. This connection also strengthened its port, which had access to the Atlantic Ocean.

Thomson led a faction that ousted the incumbent board of the Pennsylvania Railroad in 1852; Thomson became president and turned his attention more toward finance than engineering. He repeatedly reorganized the company into more efficient subdivisions, and to better cost accounting, paying careful attention to the selection of vice presidents. His organizational model was widely imitated by other railroads, and set the standard for large American businesses. In 1857 he financed the railroad's purchase of the entire system of state transportation works, consisting of 278 miles of canals and 117 miles of railroad, together with real estate and rail equipment. At a cost of $7.5 million the Pennsylvania now dominated the state and took control of most short-haul traffic from the many towns along its heavily populated route.

Thomson expanded the railroad to the west, into Ohio and beyond. In 1856, Thomson arranged for the consolidation of several western lines into the Pittsburgh, Fort Wayne & Chicago Railway. It was formally leased to the Pennsylvania in 1869 and, in 1870-71, the Pennsylvania Company, one of the first of the holding companies, was created to take over the properties west of Pittsburgh, which were developing into large northwest and southwest systems.

In 1860, the Pennsylvania represented only the main line from Philadelphia to Pittsburgh, with a few short branches. By 1869 it had expanded within Pennsylvania alone to nearly one thousand miles and also controlled lines northward to the shores of Lake Erie, through New York State. In 1869 it purchased the Pittsburgh, Fort Wayne and Chicago line, giving it a connection with Chicago through Ohio and Indiana. In 1870 the Pennsylvania began to expand on the east coast also, obtaining an entry into New York City by acquiring the United Railroad and Canal Company, which owned leased 456 miles of railroad and 65 miles of canals in New Jersey.

In 1871–1872, the Pennsylvania expanded into the Midwest by astute purchases. It bought the Cleveland and Pittsburgh Railroad in 1871 as well as smaller lines in Ohio, merging them into the system. The most important acquisition during this period was the purchase of the Pittsburgh, Cincinnati, Chicago and St. Louis, with lines extending westward from Pittsburgh to St. Louis, and branches reaching southward to Cincinnati, and northward to Chicago. This system included over 1400 miles of road, giving the Pennsylvania Railroad a second line to Chicago, a direct line to St. Louis, a second line to Cincinnati, and access to territory not previously tapped.

By 1873, Thomson also had links to the South. Thomson then built up Philadelphia as a transatlantic port, creating the American Steamship Company in 1870 under the control of the Pennsylvania Railroad. Steel was becoming available at moderate cost, and Thomson contracted with industrialist Andrew Carnegie for steel to replace all the wooden railway bridges, and to replace iron tracks with stronger steel tracks. With such infrastructure in place, trains could be designed to be heavier, faster, and more efficient.

==== Technology ====
Besides expanding the system and putting it on a solid financial basis, Thomson made the Pennsylvania the technological leader of the industry. It took the lead in changing its engines to run on coal rather than wood burning, and from iron to steel (in constructing rails, bridges and cars). With Philadelphia emerging as the center of the locomotive industry, new innovations were offered first to the Pennsylvania Railroad, which embraced them.

==== Management ====
Thomson developed a new kind of management suitable for a large dispersed corporation with many functions, partly based on the work of Daniel McCallum. Specifically, he devised a decentralized system based on geographical districts, as well as the staff and line system that became synonymous with American management. Line executives handled people and hourly operational decisions on traffic, while staff executives handled finance and paperwork.

== Business ==
As a conservative, risk-averse financier, Thomson avoided disaster during the panics of 1837, 1857, and 1873, while rival lines often went bankrupt. His Pennsylvania Railroad was worth about $400 million in the early 1870s (before the Panic of 1873 depressed values), with $25 million in traffic revenue and a profit of $8.6 million. It paid steady dividends year in and year out and was a favorite for cautious investors. The speculators who were so numerous in the post-Civil War era looked elsewhere. Thomson had a vision of a transcontinental line, invested his own money in several ventures, and briefly in 1871 the Pennsylvania controlled the Union Pacific.

Alfred D. Chandler Jr., a Harvard Business School professor, stated in 1965 that the large-scale problems of management became obvious in the middle of the 19th century with the rise of the great railroad systems, such as the Pennsylvania and the Baltimore and Ohio. New methods had to be invented for mobilizing, controlling, and apportioning capital, for operating a widely dispersed system, and for supervising thousands of specialized workmen spread over hundreds of miles. The railroads solved all these problems and became the model for all large businesses.

The main innovators were three engineers, Benjamin H. Latrobe of the Baltimore and Ohio Railroad, Daniel C. McCallum of the Erie Railroad, and Thomson of the Pennsylvania Railroad. They devised the functional departments and first defined the lines of authority, responsibility, and communication, together with the concomitant separation of line and staff duties which have remained the principles of the modern American corporation.

== Personal life ==
Thomson married Lavinia Frances Smith in 1854. They had no children together, but adopted a daughter. By the time of his death in 1874, after the national financial Panic of 1873, Thomson's fortune had declined by three-fourths, to $1.3 million. He bequeathed most of it to charity, including a fund to help orphans whose fathers may have been killed in the course of their railroad duties.

== Death ==
Thomson died in Philadelphia on May 27, 1874.

== Legacy ==
A historic marker commemorates the location of his birth in his hometown of Springfield Township, Pennsylvania, and a street in the community is named for him. The city of Thomson in McDuffie County, Georgia, was named for him.

Andrew Carnegie was a great admirer and named his main company the J. Edgar Thomson Steel Company in his honor; Carnegie also named the Edgar Thomson Steel Works in Braddock, Pennsylvania, after him.

In 1975, Thomson was inducted posthumously into the Junior Achievement U.S. Business Hall of Fame.

== Notes ==
Preceded by William C. Patterson	President of the Pennsylvania Railroad; 1852–1874	Succeeded by Thomas A. Scott
