= Thomas A. Scott Fellowship in Hygiene =

The Thomas A. Scott Fellowship in Hygiene was a competitive academic grant made at the University of Pennsylvania for the study of scientific hygiene and sanitary science, the precursors of the modern science of pathology. It was established in 1892 in the name of late railroad executive and financier Thomas Alexander Scott by his widow.

== Recipients ==
- Mazÿck Porcher Ravenel, 1893
- Fellowship vacant 1899
- John Jeremiah Wenner, 1915

== See also ==
- Thomas A. Scott Professorship of Mathematics
