= Thomas A. Scott Professorship of Mathematics =

The Thomas A. Scott Professorship of Mathematics is an academic grant made to the University of Pennsylvania. It was established in 1881 by the railroad executive and financier Thomas Alexander Scott.

== Recipients ==
- Ezra Otis Kendall, 1881–1899
- Edwin Schofield Crawley, 1899–1933
- George Hervey Hallett, 1933–1941
- John Robert Kline, 1941–1955
- Hans A. Rademacher, 1956–1962
- Eugenio Calabi, 1967–1993
- Shmuel Weinberger, 1994–1996
- Herbert S. Wilf, 1998–2006
- Charles Epstein, 2008–2021
- Ron Donagi, 2021–Present

== See also ==
- Thomas A. Scott Fellowship in Hygiene
