= St. Joseph's Church and Rectory (Rochester, New York) =

Historic church in New York, United States

- St. Joseph Roman Catholic Church and Rectory
- U.S. National Register of Historic Places
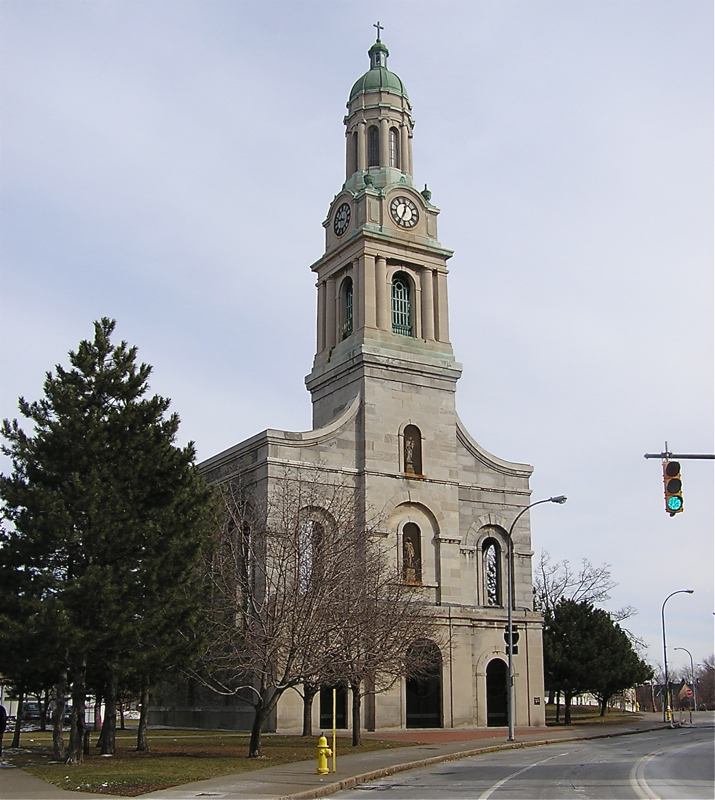
- The preserved facade of St. Joseph's Church

- Location within New York Location within the United States
- Location: 108 Franklin St., Rochester, New York
- Coordinates: 43°9′34″N 77°36′24″W
- Area: less than one acre
- Built: 1843-1846
- Architect: Jones & Nevins
- Architectural style: Greek Revival, Italianate
- MPS: Inner Loop MRA
- NRHP reference No.: 75001197
- Added to NRHP: May 29, 1975

St. Joseph Roman Catholic Church and Rectory was a historic Roman Catholic church and rectory located at 108 Franklin Street, Rochester in Monroe County, New York. The complex was listed on the National Register of Historic Places in 1975. The structure's shell has been preserved as monument after a disastrous fire.

== Architecture ==
The church was originally built 1843-1846 in the simple monumental tradition of the Greek Revival style, with a gray stone facade of a series of arched bays on the exterior facade. The simple church was enlarged in 1849 into a cruciform plan that could seat a thousand parishioners. The interior was remodeled in 1895. The first steeple was added in 1859 and replaced with a tower in 1909, designed by Joseph Oberlies.

The rectory, or community house, was constructed in 1870 in the Italianate style.

== History ==
St. Joseph's served as the mother church for the German Catholic churches in the region. Many of these satellite churches and schools lured away parishioners and students, causing building replacements to the complex and finally closure and sale in the 1970s.

The church suffered a serious fire in October 1974. The fire destroyed the church, except for the tower and walls, forcing the parish to abandon the ruin. The Landmark Society of Western New York, the State University College at Brockport, city officials, members of the Downtown Development Corporation, and the original Roman Catholic religious order all supported preserving the bell tower and three extant bays (front façade) as a monument encased in a park, named St. Joseph's Park. The conversion was carried out by Landmark Society of Western New York in 1980.
