= Charles Epstein (mathematician) =

American mathematician

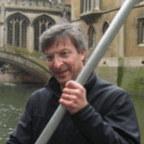
- Born: Pennsylvania, U.S.A.
- Citizenship: U.S.A.
- Education: Massachusetts Institute of Technology; Courant Institute
- Awards: Sloan Fellowship
- Scientific career
- Fields: Mathematics; Applied Mathematics
- Workplaces: Princeton University; University of Pennsylvania
- Doctoral advisor: Peter Lax
- Other academic advisors: William Thurston

Charles L. Epstein is a Senior Research Scientist in the Center for Computational Mathematics at the Flatiron Institute. He was the Thomas A. Scott Professor of Mathematics Emeritus at the University of Pennsylvania, Philadelphia.

== Research areas ==
Charles Epstein is an analyst and applied mathematician. His research interests include partial differential equations, mathematical physics, boundary value problems, mathematical biology, population genetics, nuclear magnetic resonance and medical imaging, and numerical analysis; he has also worked in hyperbolic geometry, univalent function theory, several complex variables, microlocal analysis and index theory.

== Education and career ==
He was an undergraduate in mathematics at the Massachusetts Institute of Technology and graduate student at the Courant Institute, New York University, where he received his Ph.D. in 1983 under the direction of Peter Lax.

He was a postdoc with William Thurston before moving to the University of Pennsylvania, where he has been since. Epstein won a Sloan Research Fellowship in 1988.

He is currently a Senior Research Scientist in the Center for Computational Mathematics at the Flatiron Institute, New York City, and was the Thomas A. Scott Professor of Mathematics Emeritus at the University of Pennsylvania, Philadelphia.

== Awards and honors ==
In 2014, Charles Epstein became a Fellow of the American Mathematical Society "for contributions to analysis, geometry, and applied mathematics including medical imaging, as well as for service to the profession". He was a co-recipient of the Stefan Bergman Prize in 2016.

== Books ==
- C L Epstein, Introduction to the mathematics of medical imaging. Second edition. Society for Industrial and Applied Mathematics (SIAM), Philadelphia, PA, 2008. xxxiv+761 pp. ISBN 978-0-89871-642-9
- C L Epstein, The spectral theory of geometrically periodic hyperbolic 3-manifolds. Mem. Amer. Math. Soc. 58 (1985), No. 335, ix+161 pp.

== Selected publications ==
- C L Epstein, R B Melrose, G A Mendoza, Resolvent of the Laplacian on strictly pseudoconvex domains. Acta Mathematica 167 (1991), no. 1–2, 1–106.
- C L Epstein, R Melrose, Contact degree and the index of Fourier integral operators. Math. Res. Lett. 5 (1998), no. 3, 363–381.
- C L Epstein, CR-structures on three-dimensional circle bundles. Invent. Math. 109 (1992), no. 2, 351–403.
- C L Epstein A relative index on the space of embeddable CR-structures. I. Annals of Mathematics (2) 147 (1998), no. 1, 1–59.
- C L Epstein; G M Henkin, Stability of embeddings for pseudoconcave surfaces and their boundaries. Acta Mathematica 185 (2000), no. 2, 161–237.
- D Burns, C L Epstein, Characteristic numbers of bounded domains. Acta Mathematica 164 (1990), no. 1–2, 29–71.
- D M Burns, Jr, C L Epstein, A global invariant for three-dimensional CR-manifolds. Invent. Math. 92 (1988), no. 2, 333–348.
- C L Epstein, B Kleiner, Spherical means in annular regions. Comm. Pure Appl. Math. 46 (1993), no. 3, 441–451.
- C L Epstein, Subelliptic Spin_{C} Dirac operators. I. Annals of Mathematics (2) 166 (2007), no. 1, 183–214.
