= Arlo Bates =

American author

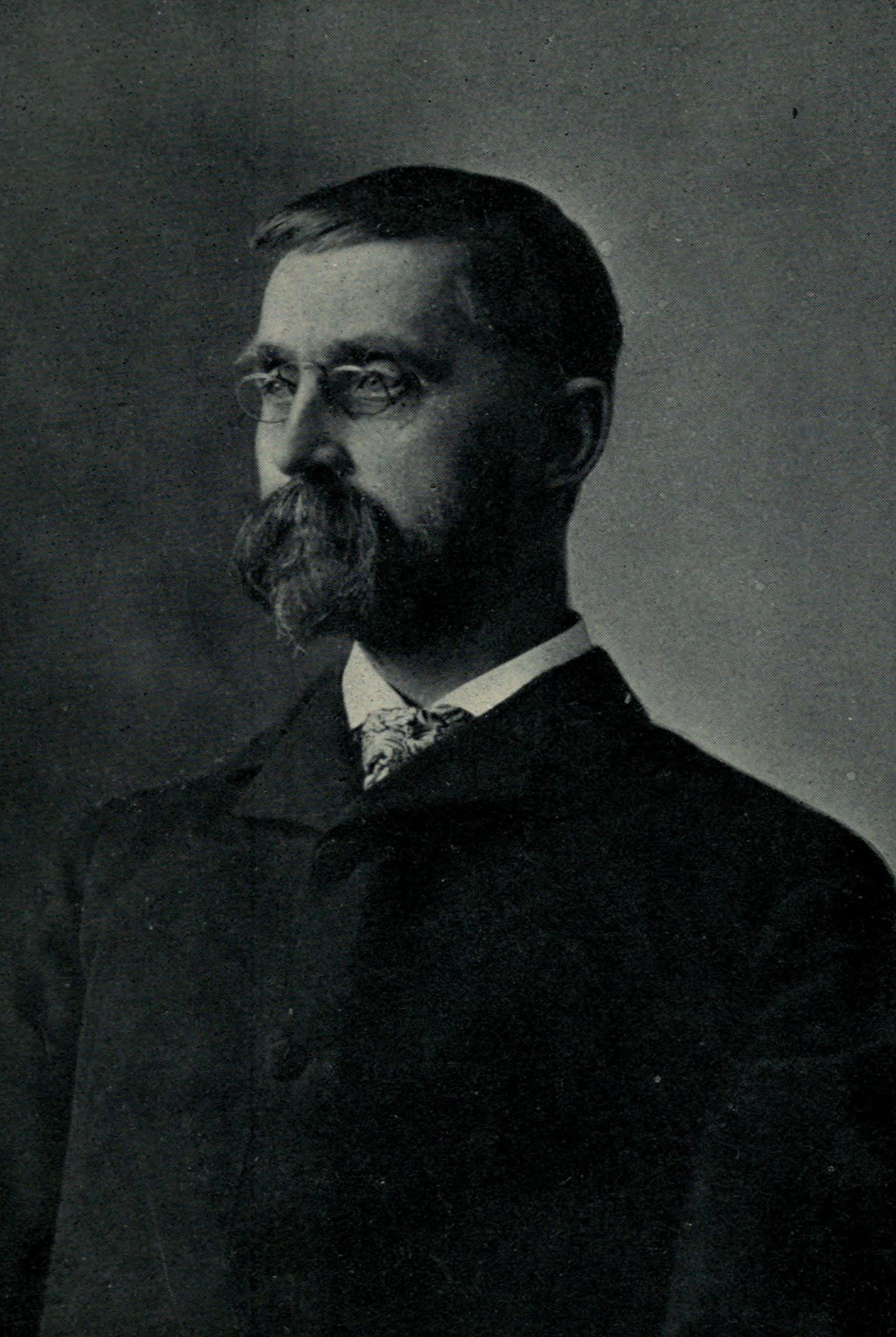
- Born: December 16, 1850; East Machias, Maine
- Died: August 25, 1918 (aged 67); Boston, Massachusetts
- Education: Bowdoin College
- Spouse: Harriet Leonora Vose (d. 1886)

Arlo Bates (December 16, 1850 – August 25, 1918) was an American author, educator and newspaperman.

== Biography ==
Arlo Bates was born at East Machias, Maine, on December 16, 1850. He graduated from Bowdoin College in 1876. In 1880 Bates became the editor of the Boston Sunday Courier (1880–1893) and afterward became professor of English at the Massachusetts Institute of Technology. He was elected a Fellow of the American Academy of Arts and Sciences in 1900.

He died on August 25, 1918.

== List of works ==
Novels:

- The Pagans (1884)
- The Wheel of Fire (1885)
- The Philistines (1888)
- Albrecht (1890)
- The Puritans (1899)
- Love in a Cloud (1900)

Collected Poems:

- Berries of the Brier (1886)
- Sonnets in Shadow, (1887)
- a Poet and his Self (1891)
- Told in the Gate (1892)
- The Torchbearers (1894)
- Under the Beech Tree (1899)

Collected Criticisms:

- Talks on Writing English (1897)
- Talks on the Study of Literature (1898)
- The Diary of a Saint (1902)
- Talks on Teaching Literature (1906)

Collected Stories:

- The Intoxicated Ghost (1908)

In 1912 he wrote an introduction to E. P. Whipple's Charles Dickens.
