= Thomas A. Scott =

American railroad executive and businessperson

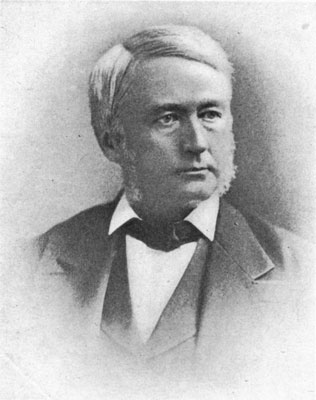
- Born: December 28, 1823; Peters Township, Franklin County, Pennsylvania, U.S.
- Died: May 21, 1881 (aged 57); Darby, Pennsylvania, U.S.
- Resting place: The Woodlands Cemetery, Philadelphia, Pennsylvania, U.S.
- Occupations: Railroad executive, politician
- Years active: 1850s–1880s
- Known for: 4th president of the Pennsylvania Railroad; United States Assistant Secretary of War; Compromise of 1877
- Spouse: Ann Dike Riddle (m.1861)
- Children: 3

Thomas Alexander Scott (December 28, 1823 – May 21, 1881) was an American businessman, railroad executive, and industrialist. In 1861, President Abraham Lincoln appointed him to serve as U.S. Assistant Secretary of War, and during the American Civil War railroads under his leadership played a major role in the war effort. He became the fourth president of the Pennsylvania Railroad (1874–1880), which became the largest publicly traded corporation in the world and received much criticism for his conduct in the Great Railroad Strike of 1877 and as a "robber baron." Scott helped negotiate the Republican Party's Compromise of 1877 with the Democratic Party; it settled the disputed presidential election of 1876 in favor of Rutherford B. Hayes in exchange for the federal government pulling out its military forces from the South and ending the Reconstruction era. In his final years, Scott made large donations to the University of Pennsylvania.

== Early life ==
Scott was born on December 28, 1823, in Peters Township near Fort Loudoun, in Franklin County, Pennsylvania. His father was a tavern-keeper. He was the 7th of eleven children. At the age of 10, he left school to work as a handyman in a general supply store, continuing this employment until he was 17. He then established several small business ventures before joining the railroad industry when he was 27. Ten years later, he became the first Vice President Philadelphia Railroad.

== Career ==
=== Railroads ===
Scott joined the Pennsylvania Railroad in 1850 as a station agent, and by 1858 was general superintendent. Scott had been recommended for promotion by Herman Haupt and later took a special interest in mentoring aspiring railroad employees, such as Andrew Carnegie (who joined the Pittsburgh telegraph office at age 16 and became Scott's private secretary and telegrapher).

The 1846 state charter to the Pennsylvania Railroad diffused power within the company, by giving executive authority to a committee responsible to stockholders, and not to individuals. By the 1870s, however, officers directed by J. Edgar Thomson (the Pennsylvania Railroad's President from 1852 until his death in 1874) and Scott had centralized power.

Historians have explained the successful partnership of Thomas Scott and J. Edgar Thomson by the melding of their opposing personality traits: Thomson was the engineer, cool, deliberate, and introverted; Scott was the financier, daring, versatile, and a publicity-seeker. In addition, they had common experiences and values, agreement on the importance of financial success, the financial stability of the Pennsylvania Railroad throughout their partnership, and J. Edgar Thomson's paternalism. Scott, for his part, was also described as ruthless and manipulative and was willing to operate in ethical gray areas in search of greater profit. This was demonstrated in his involvement in the price-fixing cartel with executives from the Baltimore and Ohio Railroad as well as the Ohio and Mississippi Railroad, among others.

By 1860, when Scott became the first Vice President of the Pennsylvania Railroad, it had expanded from a company of railway lines within Pennsylvania through the 1840s and 1850s, to a transportation empire (which it would continue to expand under his guidance from the 1860s onward).

=== Civil War ===
After the election of Abraham Lincoln, Scott was one of number of railroad men who coordinated a special train for him through the Northern states prior to his inauguration. Scott advised President Lincoln to travel covertly by rail to avoid Confederate spies and assassins.

At the outburst of the American Civil War, Pennsylvania Governor Andrew Curtin called on Scott for his extensive knowledge of the rail and transportation systems of the state. In May 1861, Scott received a commission as Colonel of Volunteers and placed in command of railroad and telegraph lines used by the Union armies. His friend, Secretary of War Simon Cameron in August 1861 appointed him Assistant Secretary of War, and gave him responsibility for building a railroad through Washington D.C. to connect the Orange and Alexandria Railroad with northern railroads. Scott also advised creating transportation and telegraph bureaus and arranging draft exemptions for experienced civilian mechanics and locomotive engineers, for needed military railroad operations were compromised by the loss of experienced railroad men. The next year, despite Cameron's replacement by Edwin M. Stanton, Scott helped organize the Loyal War Governors' Conference in Altoona, Pennsylvania.

Later on, Scott took on the task of equipping a substantial military force for the Union war effort. He assumed supervision of government railroads and other transportation lines. He made the movement of supplies and troops more efficient and effective for the war effort on behalf of the Union. In one instance, he engineered the movement of 25,000 troops in 24 hours from Nashville, Tennessee, to Chattanooga, turning the tide of battle to a Union victory.

=== Reconstruction era ===
Scott invested in oil exploration around the Ojai, California, area, sending his nephew Thomas Bard to drill oil seeps noted by Benjamin Silliman. Bard produced California's first oil gusher in 1867.

During the American Reconstruction in the aftermath of the Civil War, the Southern states needed their economy and infrastructure restored, and more investment in railroads. They had lagged behind the North in railroad miles. The Northern-based railroads competed to acquire routes and construct rail lines in the South. Federal assistance was sought by both special interest groups, but the Crédit Mobilier of America scandal made this difficult in 1872. Congress became unwilling to grant railroad companies land grants in the Southwestern United States. Mindful of the corruption allegations which had dogged his friend Cameron, Scott was notoriously secretive about his business dealings, conducting most of his business in private letters, and instructing his business partners to destroy these letters after they were read. After the Civil War, Scott was heavily involved in investments in the fast-growing trans-Mississippi River route into Texas, with long-term plans for a southern transcontinental railway line connecting the Southern states and California. He was involved in large scale acquisition of land through a method of legal intimidation. From 1871 to 1872, Scott was briefly the president of the Union Pacific Railroad, then the first transcontinental railroad owner. He was the president of the Pennsylvania Railroad from 1874, upon the death of his partner Thomson, until 1880. The financial Panic of 1873 and subsequent economic depression made it impossible to finance Scott's southern transcontinental railroad plans.

In his "Scott Plan" of the later 1870s, Scott proposed that the largely Democratic Southern politicians would give their votes in Congress and state legislatures for federal government subsidies to various infrastructure improvements, including in particular the Texas and Pacific Railway, which Scott headed. Scott employed the expertise of Grenville Dodge in buying the support of newspaper editors as well as various politicians to build public support for the subsidies. The Scott Plan became part of the Compromise of 1877, an informal and unwritten deal which settled the disputed Presidential election of 1876. However, it was never implemented. Railroad construction in the South remained at a low level after 1873 and its financial panic.

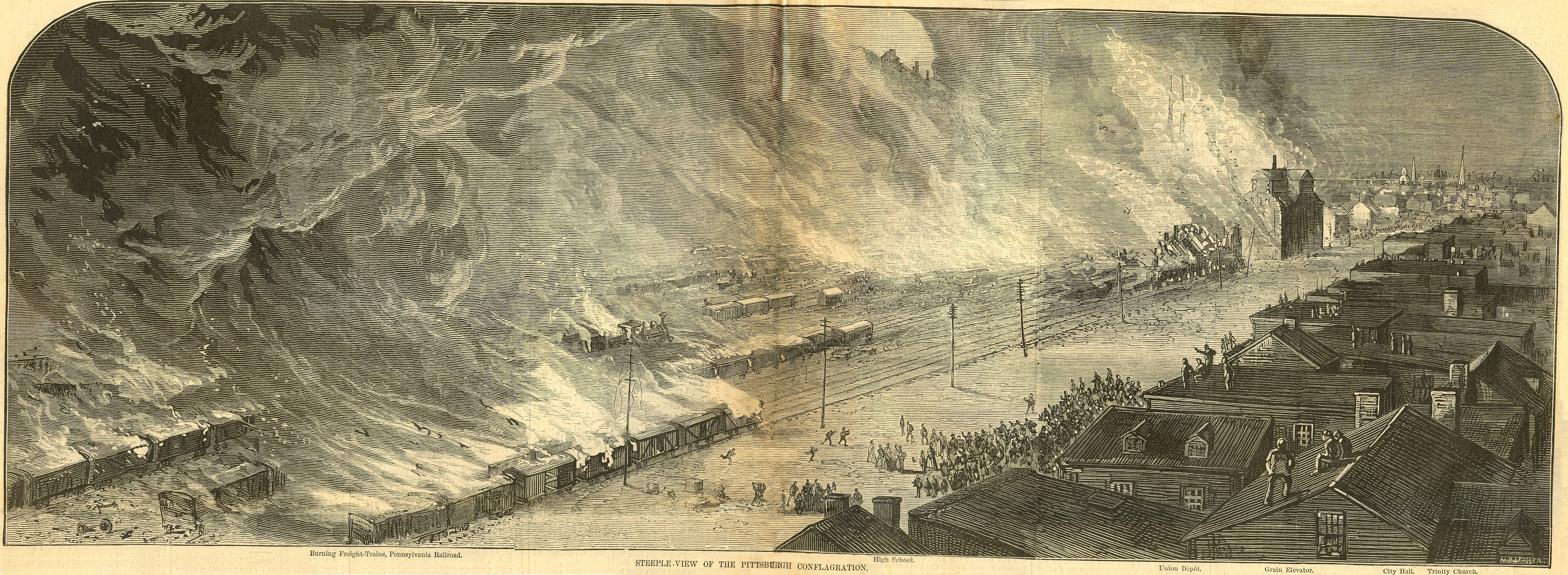
Burning of Pennsylvania Railroad and Union Depot, in the 1877 Pittsburgh railroad strike

=== Great Railroad Strike of 1877 ===
Despite Scott's best efforts, the Pennsylvania Railroad continued to lose money through the 1870s. Oil magnate John D. Rockefeller had shifted much of his transportation of product for Standard Oil to his pipelines, causing severe problems for the rail industry. Scott still controlled the railway to Pittsburgh, where the pipelines of Rockefeller did not extend, but the two men were unable to come to terms on transportation costs. In response, Rockefeller closed his plants in Pittsburgh, forcing Scott to enact aggressive pay deductions of workers.

In reaction, railroad workers went off the job and rioted in Pittsburgh; the city was the epicenter of the worst violence in the nation during the Great Railroad Strike of 1877. Scott, often referred to as one of the first robber barons of the Gilded Age, was quoted as saying that the strikers should be given "a rifle diet for a few days and see how they like that kind of bread."

== Death and legacy ==
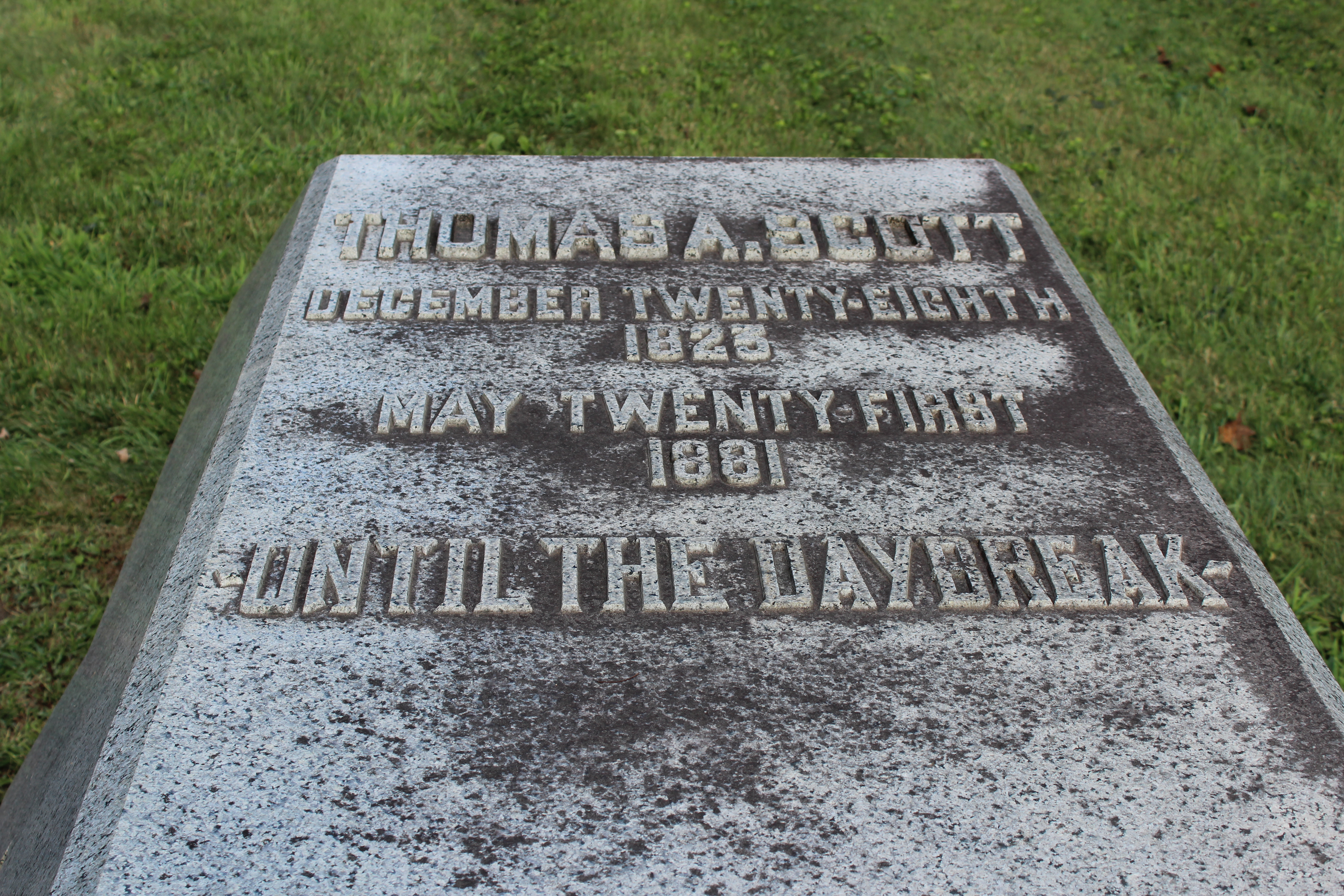
Thomas A. Scott Grave at the Woodlands Cemetery

Like his counterpart John Work Garrett of the Baltimore and Ohio Railroad, Scott never recovered from the 1877 strike. Scott's crucial business partner, John Edgar Thomson, had died in 1874. Scott suffered a stroke in 1878, limiting his ability to work. He died on May 21, 1881, and was buried at Woodlands Cemetery in Philadelphia.

The railroad-based economy of the United States was overtaken by the oil boom. Scott's protege Andrew Carnegie later challenged the Rockefeller monopoly in petroleum from his dominance of the steel industry. Just as the economy of railroads gave way to that of oil, oil in turn would face the emerging dominance of steel. During the American Civil War, the Union named a steam transport Thomas A. Scott to honor Scott. Ironically, Dr. Samuel Mudd, who had assisted President Lincoln's assassins, used it during his attempted escape from Fort Jefferson, Florida. Interested in education and health, Scott endowed certain positions at the University of Pennsylvania. His widow also made a variety of endowments in his name at the University of Pennsylvania, including:

- Thomas A. Scott Fellowship in Hygiene
- Thomas A. Scott Professorship of Mathematics
- University Hospital: endowed beds for patients with chronic diseases.

== See also ==
- South Improvement Company
- "A New War Begins", episode of The Men Who Built America

Business positions
Preceded by Oliver Ames Jr.	President of Union Pacific Railroad; 1871–1872	Succeeded by Horace F. Clark
Preceded by J. Edgar Thomson	President of Pennsylvania Railroad; 1874–1880	Succeeded by George Brooke Roberts
