= List of American isthmian canal engineers =

This is a partial list of the civil engineers who helped plan, design, or build canals in Central America from 1848 to 1984. (Note: The textual source for these predecessor agencies came, in part, from the United States National Archives, Record Group 185)

== Atlantic and Pacific Ship Canal Company survey of 1850 ==
The Nicaraguan government chartered the company in 1846 to construct a canal in that country. It was chartered in the State of New York in the United States in 1854.

- Lane, James Crandall (1823–1888) surveyed the Atrato, Pato, and Baudo rivers in 1854, which was then called New Granada, now Colombia.

In 1850, Cornelius Vanderbilt sponsored a survey of possible Nicaragua routes.

- Childs, Orville Whitmore, Colonel (1803–1870), the builder of the Champlain and Oswego canals in New York State, was chief engineer for the 1850 survey. Childs found the lowest point in "the Continental Divide between Alaska and Cape Horn.." at the isthmus of Rivas, Nicaragua, 153 feet (47 m) above sea level.

== Panama Railroad Company of 1848 – 1958 ==
The Panama Railroad was a railway line linking the Atlantic Ocean to the Pacific Ocean in Central America.

- Hughes, George W. Bvt. Lt. Col. (1820-1897) In 1849, Hughes surveyed the route location for the Panama railroad to Panama City.
- Totten, George Muirson (1808-1884) Totten was chief engineer for the railroad (1856-1875).

== Kelley surveys of 1855 – 1866 ==
Frederick M. Kelley (1822 – 1905) was a Wall Street banker who sponsored seven expeditions to discover the purported "Sea Level Interoceanic Canal" of the Isthmus of Darien.

- Kennesh, Wiliam (1799 – 1862) In late 1854, Kennish led an expedition across the Isthmus of Panama. He proposed a canal route via the Atrato-Truando rivers, suggesting the construction of tunnels to cross the Baudó Range.
- Lane, James Crandall (1823 – 1888) was a distinguished American civil engineer and military officer notable for his contributions to engineering projects and service during the American Civil War. Lane led expeditions for the Atlantic and Pacific Canal company in 1853 and 1854, focusing on the same region. His surveys provided further insights into the feasibility of constructing a canal through the Atrato River basin.
  - William C. Fox, Henry P. Adams, and S. Lee Perkins (1827 – ) accompanied Lane.
- Porter, Mark B., led an expedition in 1853.
- Trautwine, John Cresson (1810 – 1883) In 1852, Trautwine led an expedition to survey the Atrato and San Juan rivers in present-day Colombia.

== Isthmus of Darien survey of 1857 ==
- Michler, Nathaniel (1827 – 1881) Michler was an officer in the United States Army Corps of Topographical Engineers.

== Nicaragua expedition of 1872 ==
In 1872, the U.S. Navy Department initiated an expedition to survey a potential interoceanic canal route through Nicaragua.

- Crowell, J. Foster, (1848 – 1915), surveyed the Rio Sapoa and Rio Ochomogo valleys.
- Hatfield, Chester, (1837 – 1879), USN.
- Keller, John D., USN surveys of Lake Nicaragua.
- Leutze, Eugene Henry Cozzens,(1847 – 1931) USN, ran surveying operations, valleys of the Ochomogo Costa Rica, Tipitapa and San Juan, Nicaragua routes.
- Lull, Edward Phelps (1836-1887), USN. Lull led the Nicaragua Exploring Expedition from 1872 to 1873, conducting comprehensive surveys for a potential interoceanic canal through Nicaragua.
- Menocal, Aniceto García (1836 – 1908) Chief civil engineer, a Cuban-American civil engineer and naval officer.
- Miller, James Madison.,(1852 – 1908), USN. USN, surveyed Greytown harbor.
- Rhoades, William W. (1837 – 1893) USN surveyed the Rio Las Lajas route.

== The Interoceanic Canal Commission of 1872 ==
During the same period as the US Navy surveys, the United States Congress appointed another commission to recommend a route for an isthmian canal.

- Humphreys, Andrew Atkinson (1810 – 1883), Brig. Gen, US Army Corps of Engineers.
- Patterson, Carlile Pollock (1816 – 1881) United States Coast Survey
- McFarland, Walter (1847– 1888) Maj., US Corps of Engineers surveyed the Nicaragua, Darien, and Atrato River routes.

== International Canal Congress of 1879 ==
This congress, held in Paris, France, was designed to determine the best location for a canal across the Isthmus.

== Nicaragua Canal Association (1887) ==
The Association was chartered in 1887 with concessions from Nicaragua and Costa Rica. In 1889 the Association was granted an American concession in the name of the Maritime canal company of Nicaragua to build a canal across Nicaragua. The Atlantic and Pacific Ship Canal Company protested this concession.

The Maritime Canal Company formed a subsidiary, the Nicaragua Canal Construction Company, to build the canal.

- Le Baron, J. Francis (1847 – 1935)

== Nicaragua Canal Commission of 1895 – 1897 ==
- Haines, Peter Conover, (1840 – 1921)

== The Isthmian Canal Commission of 1899 – 1901 ==
This Isthmian Canal Commission was created to recommend the best location in Central America to build a canal.

- Burr, William Hubert (1851 – 1934). As a consulting engineer, Burr was also involved with the design of several bridges, tunnels, and infrastructure projects.
- Ernst, Oswald Herbert USACE, (1842 – 1926) Ernst had been Superintendent of the U.S. Military Academy (1893 – 1898).
- Haines, Peter Conover, USACE, previously a member of the previous Nicaragua Canal Commission.
- Haupt, Lewis Muhlenberg (1844 – 1937), formerly USACE and a member of the previous Nicaragua Canal Commission.
- Morison, George Shattuck (1842 – 1903) A classics major at Harvard who trained to be a lawyer, he instead became a civil engineer and leading bridge designer in North America during the late 19th century.
- Noble, Alfred (1844 – 1914), who was best known for his work on canals and also served on the Nicaragua Canal Commission in 1895.

== Isthmian Canal Commission of 1904 – 1914 ==
This Isthmian Canal Commission managed the construction of the Panama Canal in the early years of American involvement and control of the Panama Canal Zone.

=== Wallace administration (1904 – 1905) ===
The following men were engineering members of the Commission during this period.

- Wallace, John Findley (1852 – 1921) He was the first chairman of the Isthmian Canal Commission and chief engineer.
- Endicott, Mordecai T. Endicott (1844 – 1926), First civil engineer to head the Bureau of Yards and Docks.
- Ernst, Oswald Herbert USACE, (1842 – 1926) Ernst had been Superintendent of the U.S. Military Academy (1893 – 1898) and also served on the 1899-1901 Isthmian Canal Commission.
- Haines, Peter Conover, USACE (1840 – 1921). Haines had served on the previous Nicaragua Commission in 1895 and the first Canal Commission in 1899.

==== Other engineers were ====
- Baucus, William (1866 – 1936). As a civilian, Baucus served as a consulting engineer for waterworks and sewerage systems with the Municipal Engineering Department in Panama. He contributed to the construction of the pipelines for the Pedro Miguel locks.
- Dauchy, Walter Edward (1855 – 1941). Dauchy, as a civilian, was the division engineer for the Culebra Cut section of the Panama Canal. During Chief Engineer John F. Wallace's absences, he served as Acting Chief Engineer.
- Goldmark, Henry C. (1857 – 1941) Goldmark managed the design and construction of the steel gates for the Canal locks from 1906 to 1914.
- Jované, Ricardo Abel Arango (1881 – 1942). Jovane, a Panamanian civilian, was a civil engineer under the Colombia and Panama governments. In 1904, he was a division engineer in Ancon, Panama, and after the canal was completed, he became the chief engineer of the Republic of Panama.

=== Stevens administration (1905 – 1907) ===
The following men were engineering members of the Commission during this period.

- Stevens, John Frank (1853 – 1943). He was the second Chairman of the Isthmian Canal Commission and chief engineer.

=== Goethals administration (1907 – 1914) ===
The following men were engineering members of the Commission during this period.

- Goethals, George W. USACE (1858 – 1928), managed the administration and supervision of the construction and the opening of the Panama Canal (1907-1914). He was the third Chairman of the Isthmian Canal Commission, as well as Chief Engineer.
- Gaillard, David du Bose USACE (1859 – 1913), USACE. Gaillard was in charge of crossing the continental divide, or the notorious Culebra Cut, through the backbone of the isthmus.
- Harding, Chester USACE (1866 – 1936). Harding was the Division Engineer of the Gatun Locks Division from 1907 to 1914, then the Panama Canal maintenance engineer in January 1915, and the Panama Canal Zone governor from January 1917 to March 1921.
- Hodges, Harry Foote, USACE (1860 – 1929). Hodges served as General Purchasing Officer, assistant chief engineer, and member of the Isthmian Canal Commission from 1907 to 1914.
- Rousseau, Harry Harwood, USN (1870 – 1930), Chief of the Bureau of Yards and Docks and the Commission (1907-1914).

==== Other engineers were ====
- Abbot, Henry Larcom (1831 – 1927) Abbott was appointed to the Board of Consulting Engineers by Theodore Roosevelt and served between 1905 and 1906 after the Americans took control of building the canal.
- Cole, Harry Outen, (1874 - 1950) As a civilian engineer, Cole worked in various positions and eventually became the resident engineer in charge of lock and dam construction for the Pacific Division (1909-1914).
- Comber, William George (1855 - 1923). Comber, a civilian engineer, was Resident Engineer of the Cristobal Division (1905-1907). Division Engineer La Boca Dam and Dredging Division. Resident Engineer in charge of all marine work in the Pacific Division
- Cornish, Lorenzo Dana (1877 – 1934). Lorenzo, a civilian engineer, worked as a design engineer in the Chief Engineer's office (1907 – 1914).
- Hoffman, George Mathias, USACE (1860 – 1923), Hoffman was the resident engineer on the Gatun dam and spillway project (1908 – 1913).
- Jadwin, Edgar, USACE (1865 – 1931) Jadwin was Resident Engineer of the Atlantic Division (1907 – 1914).
- Hagan, James Monroe (1881 – 1955) Hagan, a civilian engineer, was the Superintendent for the Construction of the Empire District, which extended from the Empire Bridge to the Gamboa Bridge.
- Jervey, James Postell, USACE (1869 – 1947). Jervey was a resident engineer in the Atlantic Division overseeing the masonry construction of the Gatun Locks (1908 – 1913).
- Jewel, Lindsey Louin (1877– 1915). Jewel worked with the McClintic-Marshall Construction Company of Pittsburgh, Pa., and managed the construction of the lock gates (1910 - 1912). In 1912, Jewel organized the Central American Construction Company as its President and chief engineer.
- Johnson, Ben USACE (1866 – 1940) Johnson supervised excavation of the Metachin Cut and of the Mindi Approach to the Panama Canal (1907) and superintendent of excavation and concrete construction of the Gatun Locks (1909).
- Johnson, Natt M. (1877 – 1960) As a civilian engineer, Johnson worked on survey parties and in various positions associated with the production of concrete for locks and, finally, as supervisor of concrete construction.
- Mears, Fredrick USACE (1878 – 1939). Mears worked on locating the new Panama Railroad (1906-1907), then as Constructing Engineer of the relocated line from 1907 to 1909, and finally as Chief Engineer of the Panama Railroad Company.
- Monniche, Tollef Bache (1874 – 1958) As a civilian engineer, Monniche was a design engineer working on the mitered lock and emergency spillway gates.
- Reynolds, William T. (1873 – 1913). Reynolds was Superintendent of Construction for the Culebra and Central divisions (1907 - 1913).
- Rourke, Louis K. (1873 – 1933) Rourke was a civil engineer working first as Superintendent of Construction in the Culebra Division, then as Superintendent of Tracks and Dumps, and finally as Division Engineer of the Culebra Division. Rourke was a pivotal figure in managing the Culebra cut excavation.
- George Homer Ruggles (1870 – ): As a civilian engineer, Ruggles located the David extension of the Panama Railroad and then served as assistant engineer of the Culebra and Central divisions.
- Saville, Caleb Mills (1865 – 1960) As a civilian engineer, Saville worked on geotechnical investigations conducted for the Gatun dam and spillways and then construction (1907-1912).
- Sherman, Edward Clayton (1877 – 1961). As a civilian engineer, Sherman was a Division Engineer in charge of all designs relating to the dam, lock and embankments, and other work.
- Sibert, William Luther, USACE (1860 – 1935) . Silbert was responsible for the Gatun Locks and Dam, the West Breakwater in Colon, and the channel from Gatun Lake to the Pacific Ocean.
- Stickle, Horton Whitfield, USACE (1875 – 1959). Stickle worked in the Atlantic division, securing sand, stone, and cement for the Gatun locks and spillway.
- Tucker, Herman Franklin (1878 – 1955).
- Wells, George M. (1880 – 1957). As a civilian engineer, Wells worked as an office engineer in charge of the Atlantic Division designing office

== Nicaragua Canal Survey of 1929 – 1931 ==
By 1928, growing interest in expanding canal capacity led Congress to pass a resolution calling for updated surveys in Nicaragua to reassess data from 1901. The initiative also explored the viability of adding a third set of locks to the Panama Canal and potentially transforming it into a sea-level waterway.

- Groves, Leslie Richard (1896 – 1970) USACE. Groves assisted Sultan in compiling the final report.
- Sultan, Daniel I. (1885 – 1947) USACE. Sultan was commander of the United States Army Engineer Battalion in Nicaragua. The battalion numbered 25 officers and 295 enlisted men.
