= Frederick Kelley =

Frederick M. Kelley (1822–1905) was a Wall Street banker, who sponsored 7 expeditions to discover the purported "Sea Level Interoceanic Canal" of the Isthmus of Darien.

== Life ==
Frederick Mandred Kelley was born in Carmel, Putnam County, New York on July 26, 1822. His parents were Ebenezer Kelley and Huldah Foster. His father was the owner of the Bank of Carmel, Putnam County, New York. Frederick M. Kelley contracted his first marriage with Emma Josephine Gardner (1832-1879) and had no offspring. Remarried Laura Ann, on October 15, 1849, and his domicile was 153 W. 45th Street, New York. They were the parents of Francis Eugene Kelley and Robertino Kelley (1858-1949).

In 1842-43 Frederick studied at Amenia Seminary in New York. His first job was as an employee of the Bank of Drew, Robinson and Co. His boss, Mr. Daniel Drew (1797-1879) was also born in Carmel, New York. Later he devoted himself to the stock market on Wall Street and made a great fortune. In the 1855 Census, Frederick M. Kelly was 33 years old, lived in the house of his father in law William Gardner RJ at Ward 3, New York, NY with his wife Emma J. Kelley who was 23 years and Francis Eugene Kelley who was 5 years old.

Frederick M. Kelley was very interested in the publications by Alexander von Humboldt in the early nineteenth century on the communication of the Atlantic and Pacific oceans and the Atrato River. He devoted his life and fortune to pursue the dream of connecting the two oceans. He was one of the pioneers of exploration and research to find the most suitable route to unite the Atlantic and Pacific oceans through the Darien Isthmus.

== Canal ==
On June 1, 1852, the Congress of the Republic of New Granada (Colombia) passed a law "Conceding exclusive privileges to open a canal across the Isthmus of Darien." This was an honor to request to the Executive Branch by Mr. Patrick Wilson, Mr. Edward Cullen, as representatives of Mr. Charles Fox, John Henderson, and Thomas Brassey of London. The document was signed by the President of the Republic of Nueva Granada José Hilario Lopez and Secretary of Foreign Affairs José María Plata.

Upon returning to England, “The Atlantic and Pacific Junction Company” was incorporated on February 23, 1853. At that time, there was already the Agreement between His Majesty and the United States, in relation to establishing a communication between the Atlantic and the Pacific Oceans, signed in Washington April 19, 1850 (Cullen 1852; p. 141). No relationship could be established between Mr. Kelley and the British Company interested in joining the Atlantic and Pacific Oceans, but the period coincides with the date of the first expedition sponsored by Kelley and commanded by the Engineer John C. Trautwine in 1852.

The best source to learn about the work of Frederick M. Kelley is the speech delivered by himself on March 1, 1880 at the New York Merchants Gala banquet held at the Delmonico Hotel in honor of Ferdinand de Lesseps, who would initiate the construction of the Panamá Canal in 1904. Two hundred fifty people attended, and Mr. Frederick M. Kelly one of the distinguished speakers, informed the audience about the seven sponsored expeditions to explore the sea level inter-oceanic canal route.

The routes described by Frederick M. Kelley included the following:

- The Atrato-San Juan River route, which was surveyed in 1852 by Engineer John C. Trautwine of Philadelphia and subsequently made a public map of the region.
- Expedition led by Mr. Mark B. Porter in 1853.
- Expedition led by Colonel James Lane in 1853.
- Expedition led by Colonel James Lane in 1854.
- The Atrato-Truando route was discovered in 1855 by Captain William Kennish a distance of 130 miles for a canal 200 feet wide and 30 deep. He drafted two tunnels, three miles long to cross the Baudó Range. In 1858 US President James Buchanan sent Lieutenant N. Michler and 22 scientists who confirmed the findings of Capitan Kennish and informed the US Congress in 1861.
- Gulf of San Blas (Panama) was explored in 1863 by an expedition co-sponsored by Messrs Cyrus Buttler and Like T. Merritt, led by Mr. Norman Rude.
- The Bayamo river was found by Mr. McDougall who found a 30-mile inter-oceanic route through the Bayamo river and a tunnel of 7–10 miles long in 1864.

During the first expedition by engineer John C. Trautwine in 1852, he traveled the Atrato and San Juan rivers in Chocó, Colombia and drew up a map of the region. He did not find the "Canal del Cura" (Channel of the Priest) excavated by Father Gabriel Arrrachategui, pastor of Novita, with his parishioners in 1877.

Colombian Engineer Tomas Catrillón-Muñoz wrote in 1964 that the reason for having built the “Canal del Cura” was related to a boundary dispute between two families, owners of the terrain, the Mosquera and Salinas families. The Canal del Cura connects the Atrato and San Juan rivers through the Raspadura creek. It has two meters wide and allows the passage of canoes. It was the first canal built in the Americas. Engineers James Lane and Mark B. Porter who led the second, third and fourth expeditions to the area during the years 1853 and 1854, included in their study a map of the province of Chocó dated 1856. The study is titled: “Company Atlantic-Pacific Canal; Report on the Mapping of the Atrato, Pató and Baudó Rivers” (New York, 1856).

In late 1854 Frederick M. Kelley sponsored the fifth expedition under the command of Captain William Kennish. This expedition crossed the Isthmus of Panama. They arrived in Panama City where they bought a ship and sailed on the Pacific coast towards Humboldt Bay 7° north latitude, they found the estuary of the Curiche river that Kennish named the "Kelley inlet". In early 1855 he climbed the Baudó Range separating the Pacific Ocean from the Truando river valley. The Truando river is a tributary of the Atrato river which flows into the Atlantic Ocean.

On March 3, 1857 the United States Congress passed a law that authorized the Secretaries of War and Navy under the direction of the President to employ officers of the Army and Navy to explore and verify the work already done to connect the waters of the Pacific and the Atlantic by the Atrato and Truando rivers in Colombia, provided that the costs did not exceed $25,000 US Dollars. The document was signed by U.S. President James Buchanan. This route was confirmed by the expedition commanded by Lieutenant Nathaniel Michler and integrated by 22 scientists who began the journey entering the mouth of the Atrato River in the Atlantic Ocean in 1858. The report was submitted to the U.S. Congress and published in 1861. That year, the War of Secession began, and the project was filed and forgotten.

In 1856, Kelley visited Europe with Alexander Humboldt. He went to England to present the project to Queen Victoria. He spoke at the Royal Geographical Society chaired by Robert Stephenson and was awarded the Telford Gold Medal. This is the highest award given by the British Institution of Civil Engineers for publications on the engineering field; Kelley was not an engineer. He wrote several pamphlets and articles in English and French. In 2014 the Digital Library of the National University of Colombia published the Spanish translation of his book printed in New York in 1855 by Gomez, J. and Baldwin, C. Later on, Kelley went to France to obtain the cooperation of this country. Emperor Napoleon III offered to finance a third of the cost of the construction of the canal. Kelley declined, and went back to New York.

For many years Frederick M. Kelley devoted his time and fortune to the promotion of the company. In the early 1860s he sent two expeditions to the Province of Panama:

- The first one, found the path of the Gulf of San Blas, led by Norman Rude in 1863.
- The second expedition, returned to San Blas Gulf, and the Bayano River and was led by A. McDougal in 1864. They found that the distance between the Gulf and the river (or pipe) was 30 miles, and a tunnel of 7–10 miles long was needed.

In 1866 Mr. Kelley was in Washington conferring with Admiral Davis on the Interoceanic Canal. It is said of Frederick M. Kelley that he "produced more intelligible information towards solving this problem, such great importance to the world trade and political interests, which had been given so far." His research and experience with recognized authority on this subject have a more comprehensive and accurate knowledge of all matters relating to inter-oceanic canals ".

"For several years Mr. Frederick M. Kelley, a young Wall Street banker held the concession now owned by the French company, and spent his private fortune of one hundred twenty thousand dollars in the promotion of the company, which still can contribute energy and expertise the French company having shown some willingness to recognize their services. "

Ernesto Guhl (1915-2000) in the biography of Codazzi wrote: "Frederick M. Kelley engaged for almost ten years to the question of the canal, with immense energy but also with many mistakes, later he confesses." “When, in 1851, I started studying scientific history and geographic contours of Central America, ignoring much of what had been written in the past and, of course, nothing could learn valuable data that has been accumulated since. "

=== Book ===
The book written by Frederick M. Kelley, was titled “The Union of the Oceans by Ship-Canal Without Locks Via the Atrato Valley [The union of the oceans through a canal without locks, for the transit of vessels, via the valley of the Atrato] (New York, 1859), p. 5.

According to the 1900 census, Mr. Kelley was 70 years old and had lost his entire fortune and lived in a nursing home for widowers in New York. He died in 1905 and is buried in the Cemetery Kelley Carmel, NY. (Ancestry Library Edition).

=== Death ===
His obituary says: "The death of Mr. Kelley, Frederick M. Daily Putnam County Courier, December 8, 1905 date. "Frederick M. Kelley, one of the leading men of Carmel sent throughout the world, died in New York on Sunday evening at age 83, leaving two sons, Francis Eugene Kelley who lives in Saratoga, and Robertino Kelley who lives in Toledo, Ohio. He was buried in the Kelley cemetery on Wednesday at the family plot. His death followed close behind his sister Mrs. Milan J. Cole. Leaves a brother Thomas F.R. Kelley and two sisters Hopkins and Ms. Kelly in the old house out east of Carmel Village.” (Courtesy of the Library published in Mahopac, New York.)

== See also ==
- History of the Panama Canal
