= John C. Trautwine =

American civil engineer (1810–1883)

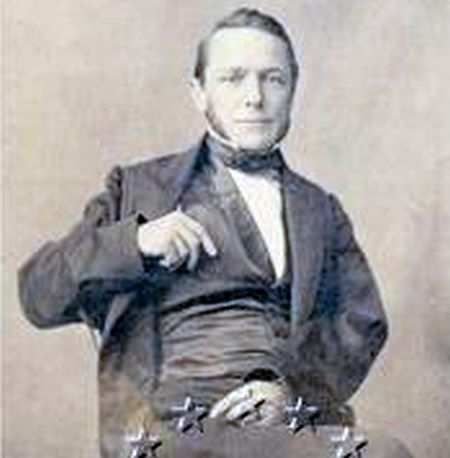
John Cresson Trautwine

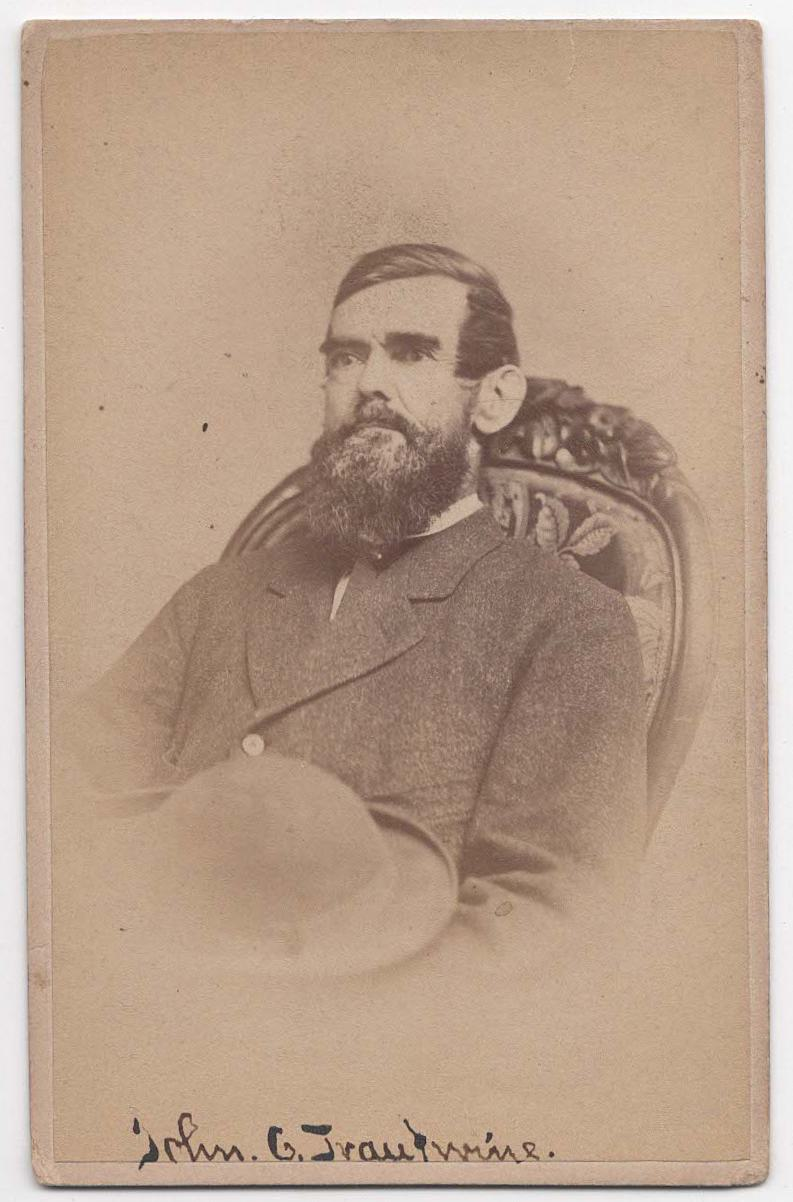
John Trautwine CDV

John Cresson Trautwine (March 30, 1810, Philadelphia, Pennsylvania – September 14, 1883, Philadelphia) was an American civil engineer, architect, and engineering writer. He was a consultant and surveyor for numerous canal and railroad projects in North and South America.

== Career ==
Trautwine began studying civil engineering in the office of William Strickland, an architect and early railroad civil engineer, and helped erect the second building of the United States Mint in Philadelphia.

In 1831, he became a civil engineer with the Columbia Railway. In 1835, under Strickland's direction, he drew one of the earliest maps of Maryland: a proposed route for the Wilmington and Susquehanna Railroad from Wilmington, Delaware, to North East, Maryland.

In 1835, Trautwine designed Pennsylvania Hall, the first building erected for Gettysburg College. A "temple-style edifice with four columns in the portico", it was, as of 1958, the only building he was known to have designed.

In 1836, he became an engineer with the Philadelphia and Trenton Railroad. From 1836 to 1842, he was an engineer with the Hiawassee Railway, which connected Georgia and Tennessee.

In 1838, Trautwine once again worked under Strickland, as assistant engineer for the W&S, which had merged with three other railroads to create the first rail link from Philadelphia to Baltimore. (This main line survives today as part of Amtrak's Northeast Corridor.) His service is noted on the 1839 Newkirk Viaduct Monument in Philadelphia.

In 1844, Trautwine was elected as a member to the American Philosophical Society.

From 1843 to 1848, with fellow engineer George M. Totten, he built the Canal del Dique between the Bay of Cartagena and the Magdalena River in Colombia. He also planned a system of docks for the city of Montreal.

In 1850, he executed surveys for the Panama Railway, and along with George M. Totten, was one of the chief engineers for its construction. In 1852, he again surveyed Panama, this time for a ship canal, and concluded that such a thing would never be practical.

He also executed surveys for the Lackawanna and Lanesborough Railway in Susquehanna County, Pa., in 1856, and for a railway route across Honduras in 1857.

== Writings ==
Trautwine wrote several engineering texts that became standards in the field. His Civil Engineer's Pocket Book (1871) was long known as the "engineer's bible"; it passed through many editions under the later editorship of John Cresson Trautwine Jr. and J.C. Trautwine 3rd.

Three of Trautwine's books were among the 16 recommended for students in George Vose's 1872 classic Manual for Railroad Engineers and Engineering Students:

- Method of Calculating the Cubic Contents of Excavations and Embankments (1851)
- Field Practice for Laying out Circular Curves for Railroads (1851)
- Civil Engineer's Pocket-book, 1871 (1904 edition prepared by J. C. Trautwine III)
