= George M. Totten =

American civil engineer (1808–1884)

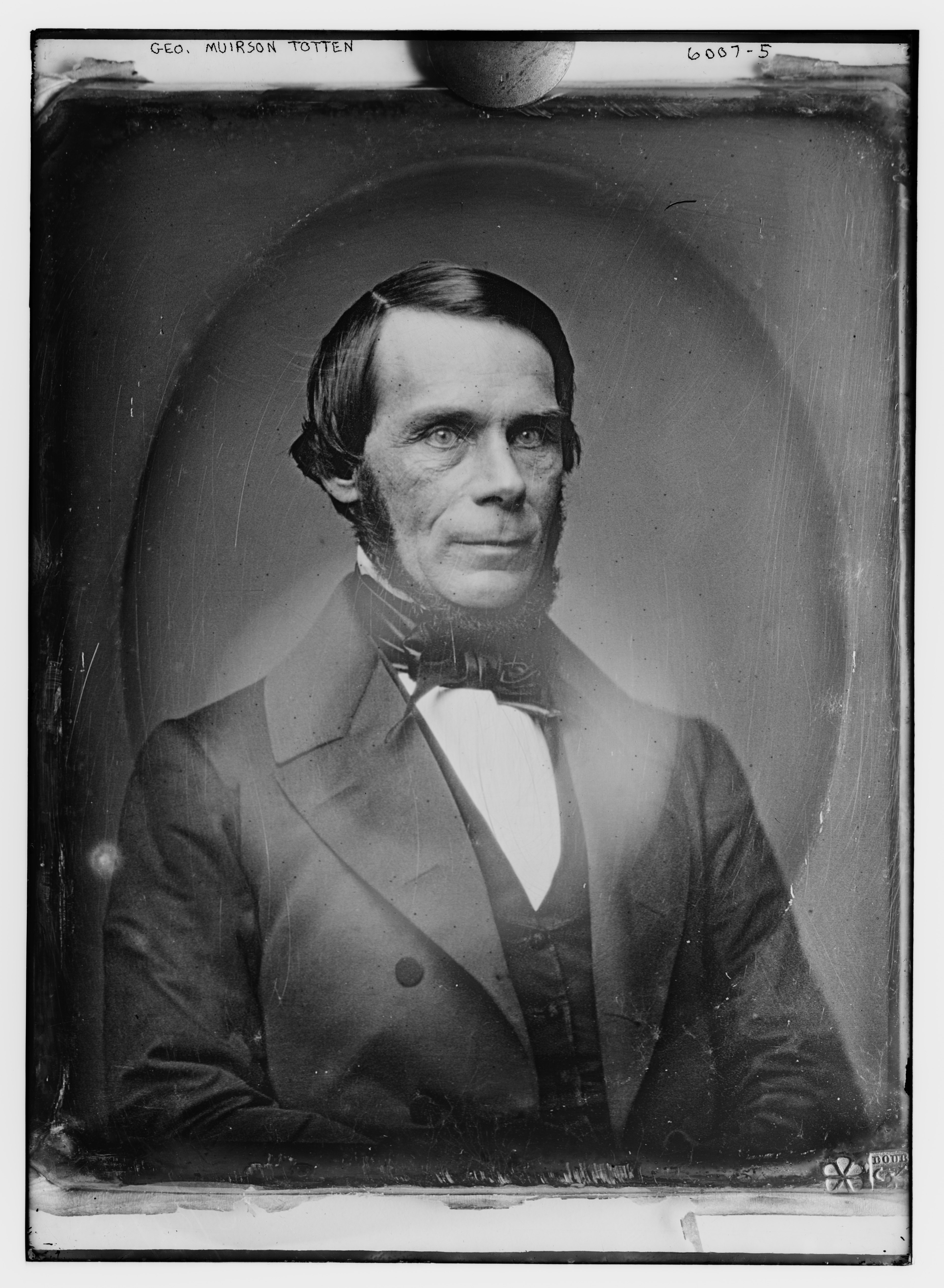
George Totten

George Muirson Totten (1808-1884) was a civil engineer who built several important canals and railroads in the mid 1800s. He was the chief engineer for the Panama Canal Railway, which preceded the Panama Canal by almost 60 years.

Originally from Connecticut, at age 20 he began working as an engineer, and was involved with the construction of several canals: the Juniata, the Farmington, and the Delaware and Raritan Canals. After steam locomotives became commercially viable, he entered railroad construction in 1835, and worked on building railroads in Pennsylvania. Between 1840 and 1843 he was head construction engineer on the road connecting Gastonia and Raleigh, North Carolina.

From 1843 to 1848, along with his engineering partner, John Cresson Trautwine, he worked for the government of New Granada (present day Colombia/Panama), on the Canal del Dique, which connected the Magdalena River with Cartagena harbor.

In 1850 Totten and Trautwine became the chief engineers for the Panama Railroad, the first railway line to connect the Atlantic and Pacific oceans. Construction of the 47.6 mile (76.6 km) long railroad lasted five years under difficult circumstances, and was completed in 1855. It is estimated that perhaps 6,000 workers died in the construction of the railroad, primarily from disease. In the summer of 1852 alone, 51 engineers, surveyors, and draftsmen - nearly all of Totten's staff - died of cholera. Totten himself had an attack of yellow fever so severe that his companions built a coffin for him at one point. After its completion, he remained in Panama until 1875 as the railroad's head engineer.

In 1851, Totten was elected as a member of the American Philosophical Society.

After the Panama Railroad was complete, in 1857 he conducted a survey for a canal which could cross Panama from the Atlantic Ocean at Limon Bay to the Pacific Ocean at Panama City. In 1879, founder of the French Panama Canal Company Ferdinand de Lesseps appointed Totten as the head of the company's engineers, however by 1880 Totten had retired.

Totten also built the first railroad in Venezuela, from Caracas to La Guayra. For his work, General Guzman Blanco, ruler of Venezuela, gave him a gold medal. French Emperor Napoleon III awarded him a gold ring in recognition for his work.

Totten died on May 17, 1884, in New York City.
