= Sapoá River =

River in Costa Rica and Nicaragua

Sapoá River (Spanish: Rio Sapoá) is a river of Costa Rica. With headwaters in the Guanacaste National Park, it flows north and crosses into Nicaragua. It empties into Lake Nicaragua.
