= Canal del Dique =

Canal in Colombia

Coordinates: 10°09′N 75°30′W

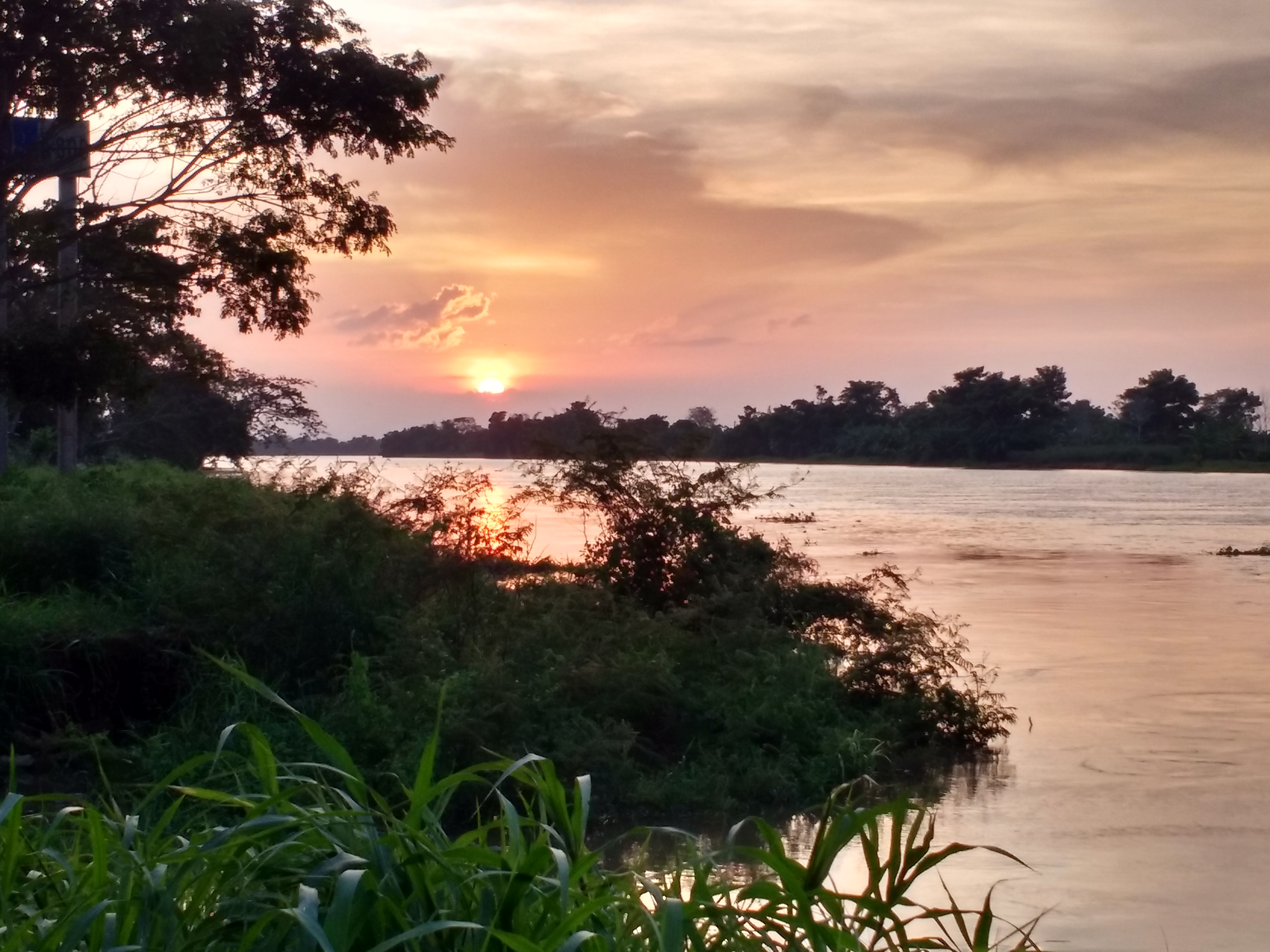
Sunset in the Levee Channel in Mahates town

The Canal del Dique (English: Levee Channel) is a 118 km canal that connects Cartagena Bay (at the corregimiento of Pasacaballos) to the Magdalena River in the Bolívar Department in northern Colombia. The canal is a bifurcation or artificial arm of the Magdalena River, and its eastern portion forms most of the border between the departments of Bolívar and Atlántico. Its port on the Magdalena River is Calamar.

== History ==
The canal was built by the Spanish Empire in 1582 to bypass the shoals and sandbars of the Magdalena River delta and thereby connect the region's main colonial ports (Cartagena and Santa Marta) to the interior of what is today Colombia. It quickly fell into disrepair, and was rebuilt in 1650.

However, by the end of the 18th century, it had become impassable except during times of high runoff, and by 1821 it was completely blocked. Trade moved increasingly away from Cartagena to Santa Marta and Sabanilla, a port near the mouth of the Magdalena, later eclipsed by Puerto Colombia and Barranquilla. By 1831, traders in the city began to lobby for the canal's reopening, but repeated efforts to redredge the channel failed. In the mid-19th century, U.S. engineer George M. Totten helped rebuild part of the canal. By the end of the 19th century, a railroad had largely replaced it.

In 1923 and 1952, the canal was improved, but use then began to decline due to increased sedimentation of the Magdalena River. In 1972 an extensive study was made of the morphology of the Rio Magdalena and the Canal del Dique.

As of 2009, a modernization of the channel was being considered to boost trade in the port of Cartagena.

Since 2013, river diversions have been planned with Dutch company Royal Haskoning DHV to control sediment and water flow along the canal. This has led to creation of a new mangrove wetland area, land building and ecological restoration in the region.

=== In the literature ===
The canal figures prominently in Gabriel García Márquez's novel Love in the Time of Cholera.
