= Haupt =

Haupt is a German and Czech surname. Czech-language feminine form is Hauptová. Notable bearers include:

- Benjamin Haupt, German politician
- Christopher Lehmann-Haupt (1934–2018), American journalist, editor, critic and novelist
- Enid A. Haupt (1906–2005), American publisher and philanthropist
- Georg Haupt (1741–1784), Swedish cabinet maker
- Georges Haupt (1928–1978), Romanian and French historian of socialism
- Greg Haupt (1981–2022), American guitarist, Story of the Year
- Herbert Haupt (born 1947), Austrian politician
- Herman Haupt (1817–1905), American railway engineer
- Hermann Haupt (1873–1959), German entomologist
- Lewis M. Haupt (1844–1937), American civil engineer
- Moritz Haupt (1808–1874), German philologist
- Paul Haupt (1858–1926), German Assyriologist
- Zygmunt Haupt (1907–1975), Polish writer and painter
- Ullrich Haupt, Sr. (1887–1931), German film actor
- Ullrich Haupt, Jr. (1915–1991), German actor
- Zoe Hauptová (1929–2012), Czech Slavicist and chief editor of the Old Church Slavonic Dictionary

== See also ==
- Haupt (mountain), Obwalden, Germany
- Hauptman
- Hauptmann (disambiguation)
- ru:Хаупт, alternative Russian transliteration
