= List of U.S. military railroad civil engineers in the American Civil War =

Civil engineers who helped build military railroads during the American Civil War

The U.S. Military Railroad (USMRR) was established by the United States War Department as a separate agency to operate any rail lines seized by the government during the American Civil War. An Act of Congress of 31 January 1862 authorized President Abraham Lincoln to seize control of the railroads and telegraph for military use in January 1862. In practice, however, the USMRR restricted its authority to Southern rail lines captured in the course of the war. As a separate organization for rail transportation, the USMRR is one of the predecessors of the modern United States Army Transportation Corps.

This is a partial list of the civil engineers who worked on the USMRR during the American Civil War (1862–1867) as reported by General Daniel McCallum in 1866.

== Military railroad civil engineers ==
=== Virginia (1862–1866) ===
- Anderson, Adna (1827–1889), engineer of repairs for railroads running from Alexandria.
- Beggs, John S., (1821–1889) superintendent of railroads running from Harper's Ferry, West Virginia (Winchester and Potomac Railroad). (1864)

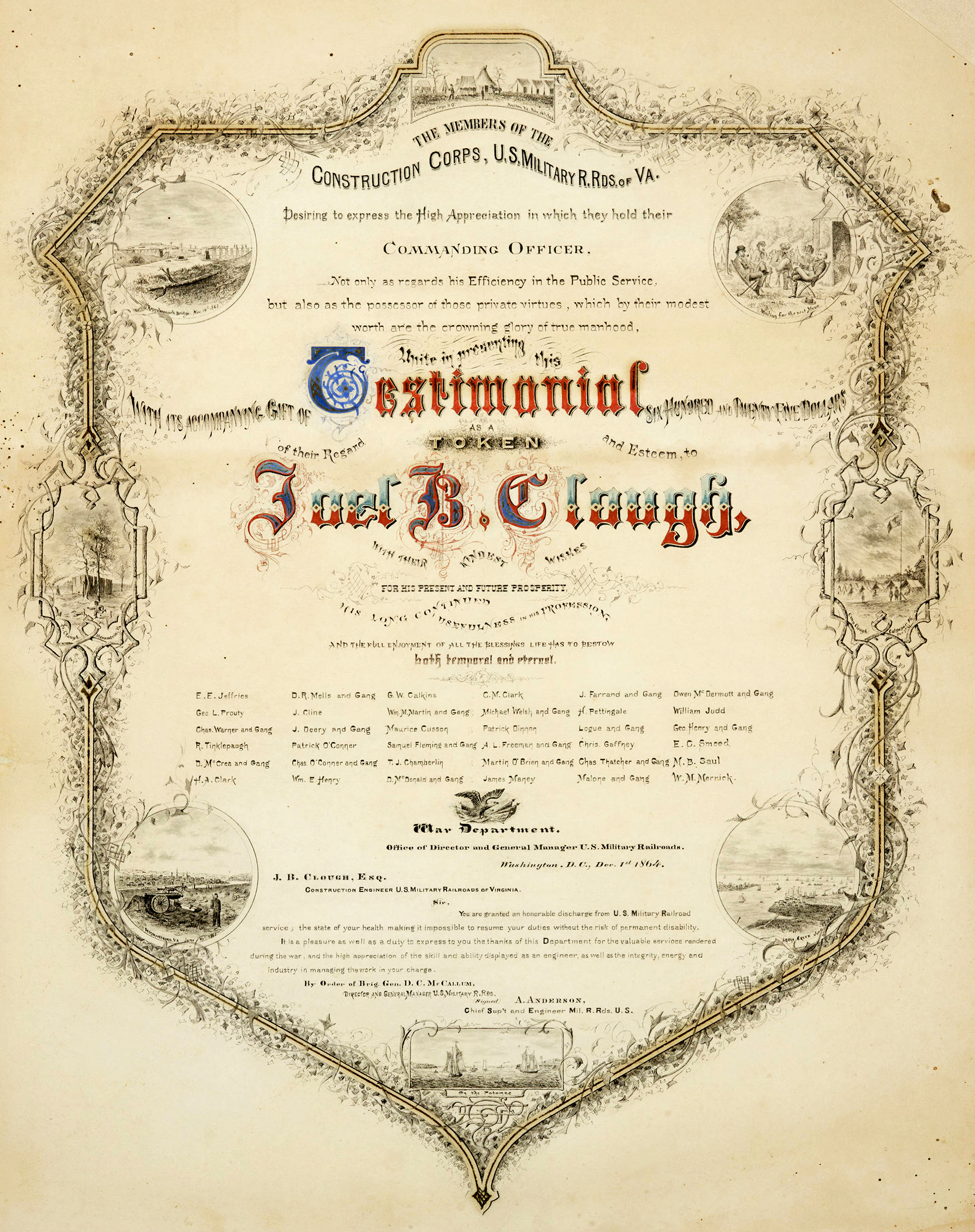
1866 USMRR Joel B.Clough discharge certificate

- Clough, Joel Barber (1823–1887), Construction engineer (1863)
- Devereux, John Henry, (1832–1886), superintendent of railroads running from Alexandria, Virginia. (1862)
- Hays, T. D., engineer of repairs for railroads running from City Point Railroad. (1866)
- Henry, William E.(1820–1900) supervisor, Const. Corp., Alexandria.
- Huntington, G. M., superintendent of railroads running from City Point Railroad. (1864–1865)
- McAlpine, C. L, engineer of repairs for railroads running from City Point Railroad. (1864–1865)
- McCallum, P., superintendent of railroads running from Alexandria, Virginia. (1865)
- McCrikett, M. J., superintendent of railroads running from Alexandria, Virginia. (1864)
- Moore, James J. (1821–1899) engineer of repairs for railroads running from Alexandria. (1863–1865)
- Wentz, Erasmus Livingston, (1818–1900), engineer and superintendent, Richmond and York River Railroad and Norfolk railroads.
- Wright, William Wierman (1824–1882) engineer and superintendent, Aquia Creek Railroad;
- Woodward, H. F., superintendent, Norfolk railroads. (1864–1865)

=== Department of the Mississippi (1864–1865) ===
- Anderson, Adna (1827–1889), general superintendent of railroads in 1864.
- Burgin, John F. division engineer of Fourth Division of Construction Corps in 1864.
- Cheney, A. J., superintendent Knoxville and Bristol Railroad and Chattanooga, and Atlanta Railroad in 1865.
- Clark, Col. John (1822–1872), in charge of construction on the Nashville and Northwestern railroad in 1864.
  - William McDonald, assistant engineer.
  - Charles Latimer, assistant engineer.
- Dickinson, A. W., superintendent for Nashville railroads in 1865.
- Eicholtz, L. H. (1827–1911) division engineer of First Division in 1864 and acting chief engineer of Construction Corps as necessary in 1865.
- Gifford, W. R., superintendent for Nashville, Decatur, and Stevenson Railroad in 1865.
- Goodhue, A. F., (d.1912) engineer and superintendent railroads at Memphis, Tenn., and Columbus, Ky in 1864 and then West Tennessee, Kentucky, and Arkansas in 1865.
- Hebard, Alfred,(1811–1896) engineer of repairs for Nashville railroads in 1865.
- Hudson, George W., superintendent for Nashville railroads in 1865.
- Kingsley, W. R., division engineer of Fifth Division of Construction Corps in 1864 and division engineer on the Nashville and Northwestern Railroad in 1865.
- Smeed, Eben C., division engineer of Second Division of Construction Corps in 1864 and engineer of repairs in North Carolina in 1865.
- Stevens, W. J., superintendent railroads running from Nashville in 1864 and general superintendent in 1865.
- McPherson, R. B. assistant general superintendent in 1865.
- Talmadge, A. A., superintendent Chattanooga railroads in 1865.
- Van Dyne, J. B., chief master of transportation in 1865.
- Wentz, Erasmus Livingston, (1818–1900), general superintendent of railroads in 1865.
- Wright, Col. L. P., superintendent railroads running from Chattanooga in 1864 and Memphis railroads in 1865.
- Wright, William Wierman (1824–1882) chief engineer of Construction Corps (1864–1865) and general superintendent of military railroads in North Carolina in 1865.
