= Smeed =

Smeed may refer to:

== People ==
- Smeed, Eben C. (1830–1892) an American civil engineer who was best known for his civil war work supporting Sherman's Atlanta and Savannah campaigns.
- Smeed, George (1812–1881) Sittingbourne entrepreneur supplying bricks to Victorian London.
- Smeed Cross, Katherine (1858–1943) was an American social leader in Kansas.
- Smeed, Norah Lillian Emily (1900–1968) was a British actress of stage and screen.
- Smeed, Reuben CBE (1909–1976) was a British statistician and transport researcher.

== Other ==
- Eliza Smeed (1867) the biggest barge ever launched in Kent, U.K. and rigged as a barquentine fitted with leeboards.
- George Smeed a Thames barge built in 1882 by Smeed Dean & Co. Ltd. in Murston, U.K.
- Smeed's Law, empirical rule relating traffic fatalities to traffic congestion.
- Smeed Report, (1962–1964) a study into alternative methods of charging for road use, commissioned by the UK government.
