= William Wierman Wright =

American civil engineer (1824–1882)

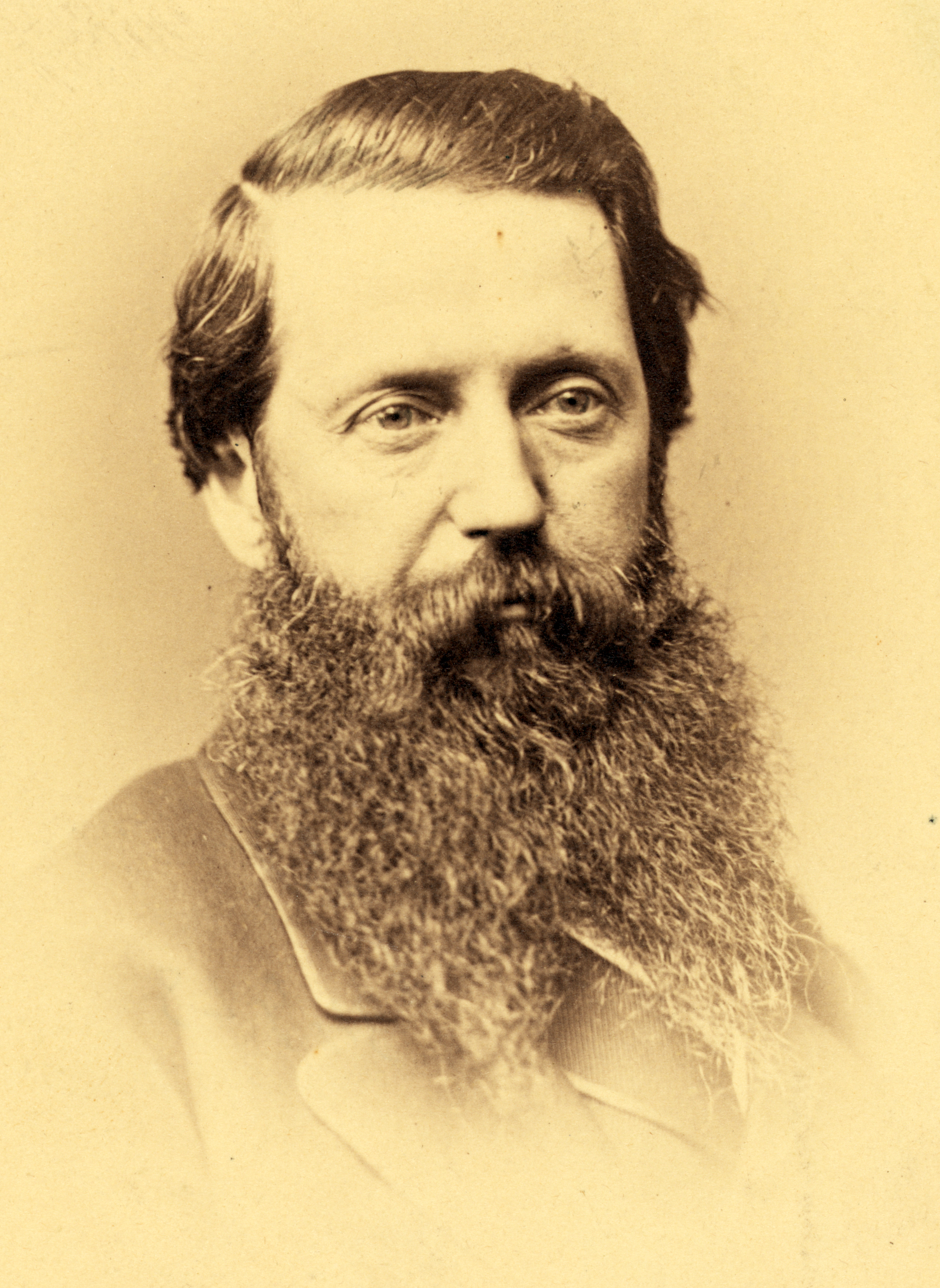
- Born: July 27, 1824; York Springs, Pennsylvania, US
- Died: March 9, 1882 (aged 57); Philadelphia, Pennsylvania, US
- Resting place: Huntington Quaker Meeting House Cemetery, Latimore Township, Adams County, Pennsylvania
- Education: Civil engineering
- Parent(s): William Wright (1788-) and Phoebe Wierman (1790-)
- Engineering career
- Discipline: Civil
- Employers: Pennsylvania railroad, US military railroad
- Military career
- Allegiance: United States; Union
- Branch: United States Army; Union Army
- Service years: 1862–1867
- Rank: Brigadier General
- Commands: U.S. Military Railroads
- Conflicts: American Civil War

William Wierman Wright (July 27, 1824 – March 9, 1882) was a well known nineteenth century American railroad engineer and civil engineer. He was born in York Springs, Pennsylvania.

== Early life and career ==
Wright was born in York Springs, Pennsylvania on July 27, 1824, being the son of William Wright (1788–1865) and Phoebe Wierman (1790–1873), one of six children. Wright's family were well-known Quakers in Adams county and he finished his education at the academy at Gettysburg, under the charge of Herman Haupt.

=== Pennsylvania railroad ===
In 1847, Wright joined the corps of engineers working on the Pennsylvania railroad and remained until 1854. He started under chief engineer Samuel W. Mifflin (1805–1885) who was in charge of the mountain division, extending from Jack's narrows to the Allegheny summit. Mifflin at that time was one of five principal assistants to William B.Foster, Associate Engineer in charge of the Eastern Division. The names of the other assistants were Edward Tilghman, A. Worral, Strickland Kneass, and Thomas T. Wierman (1813–1887), another Adams County resident. During this period, Wright also worked for Herman Haupt as his assistant engineer.

By 1854, Wright was the principal assistant engineer in charge of the Western Division of the railroad's mainline. In 1855 he became the Chief Engineer of the Memphis & Charleston Railroad, replaced by Thomas W. Seabrook. The road was the first railroad in the United States to link the Atlantic Ocean with the Mississippi River. Wright returned to the Pennsylvania railroad in 1859 and remained there until the beginning of the Civil War.

=== Interoceanic Railway Company ===
In 1857, he went to Honduras, Central America to work with John C. Trautwine of Philadelphia who was chief engineer of a party surveying a line from the Atlantic to the Pacific Ocean for the Honduras Interoceanic Railway.

== Civil War ==
In May 1862, Wright along with Eben C. Smeed, I.B. Nevins, G. F. spear, W.R Fulton, and Samuel Longmand was recruited by Herman Haupt as a civilian foreman to help rebuild the Fredericksburg railroad from Aquia Creek.

In September of that year, Wright was ordered by Haupt to take charge of Cumberland Valley Railroad operations along with another Western Division civil engineer for the Pennsylvania Railroad, Joseph D. Potts (1829–1893).

=== Richmond, Fredericksburg, and Potomac Railroad ===
May 1863-Photograph by Captain Andrew J. Russell at the site of Sedgewick's charge at Marye's heights in Virginia with Herman Haupt and William W. Wright

In November 1862, Wright was assigned by Haupt as Chief Engineer and Superintendent of Richmond, Fredericksburg, and Potomac Railroad to rebuild the wharves at Acquia creek as well as fifteen miles of the railroad to Fredericksburg, Virginia controlled by the Union army with Adna Anderson acted as chief engineer of construction. After rebuilding the bridges and wharves for the road, Wright was forced to abandon Acquia creek on September 6, 1862, due to Lee's victory at the Second Battle of Bull Run. Wright returned to Acquia creek in November 1862 while Lee had destroyed the railroad line from its terminus at Acquia creek all the way to Fredericksburg. Wright rebuilt the road again but was forced to again abandon the railroad in June 1863 when Lee's advance to Gettysburg forced Union forces to retreat from their Fredericksburg positions. Wright left the military railroad and returned home to Pennsylvania.

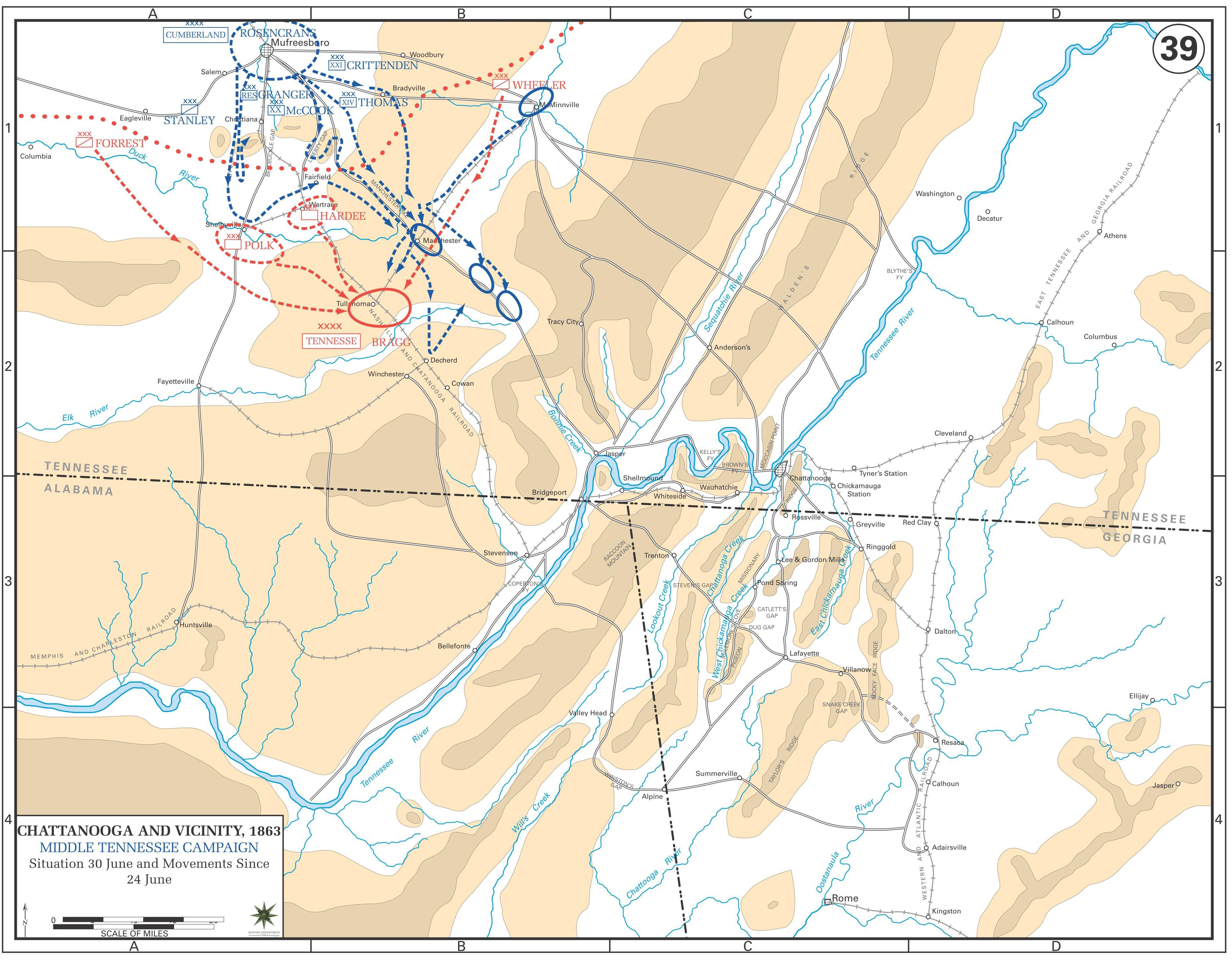
Railroad lines into Chattanooga, TN in 1863/1864

=== Military Division of the Mississippi ===
This Department was the largest and included the Departments of Cumberland, Ohio, and Tennessee. The department separated its construction and transportation divisions...

"(T)he transportation division had charge of transportation, maintenance, and repair of the road, and was operated under a general superintendent. He was instructed to employ the best practical talent of the country to act as superintendents of the various lines. The construction corps' duties comprised the construction of new lines and the opening of them for the use of the transportation department. This corps was under a chief engineer, who was directed to organize and equip a corps large enough for the purpose." (Swanter, 1929) In December 1863, General Daniel McCallum, Military Director and Superintendent of the United States Military Railroad was ordered to assess and evaluate the conditions of the railroad lines supplying the Union army located at that time in the vicinity of Chattanooga, Tennessee. The mission of the USMRR was to rebuild the railroad supply lines into Chattanooga from Nashville and Knoxville.McCallum's strategy was to rebuild the rail lines into Nashville and then rebuild the lines into Chattanooga.

This meant rebuilding the Nashville and Chattanooga Railroad from Nashville to Stevenson, Alabama, the Central Alabama railroad to Decatur, Alabama Memphis and Charleston Railroad, and the East Tennessee and Georgia Railroad that ran between Chattanooga and Knoxville. The segment of the M&C railroad between Bridgeport, Alabama and Chattanooga had suffered much damage at the hands of the retreating Confederates, two major bridges had been destroyed, the first over 1,500 foot in length at the Tennessee River and the second at 800 feet and 95 feet high at Running Water, Tennessee.

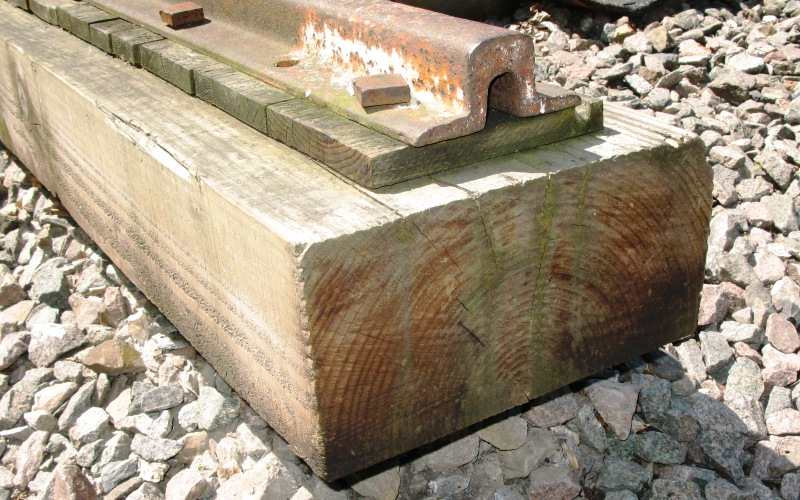
Example of "U" rail section on longitudinal sleepers as used on Nashville and Chattanooga Railroad in 1863

In December 1863, Wright rejoined the U.S. Military Railroad construction corps. Over the next four months, Wright mobilized a workforce of two thousand men and numerous military engineer units such as the Virginia Construction Corps of three hundred men, 1st Regiment Missouri Volunteer Engineers under Colonel Henry Flad, 1st Regiment Michigan Volunteer Engineers and Mechanics under Colonel William Power Innes, and the 12th and 13th regiments of the United States Colored Troops.

==== Reconstruction of railroads into Chattanooga ====
In general, these railways were torn up by the retreating Confederates, and bridges and stations were burned. As fast as the Union army occupied new territory, the railroads had to be reconstructed and opened for use, and they were always subject to constant guerrilla raids. Frequently the army was driven back and the line was lost, which made necessary a second rebuilding after the next advance. An example of this was the Buell campaign of 1863 the road was opened as far as Stevenson, Alabama but it was lost when Buell retreated in the late fall. It was recaptured by Rosecrans late in 1863 and was rebuilt to Chattanooga. These railroads furnished all the supplies to the Union armies in the field. The problem was that the railroad lines were one of the few in the Confederacy with U rail laid on longitudinal stingers with no ballast on the roadbed. Wright reopened the line into Chattanooga in January 1864 and the Union army was able to issue full rations to the soldiers for the first time since they took Chattanooga in early December 1863.

Trestle bridge at Whiteside, Tenn. gallery

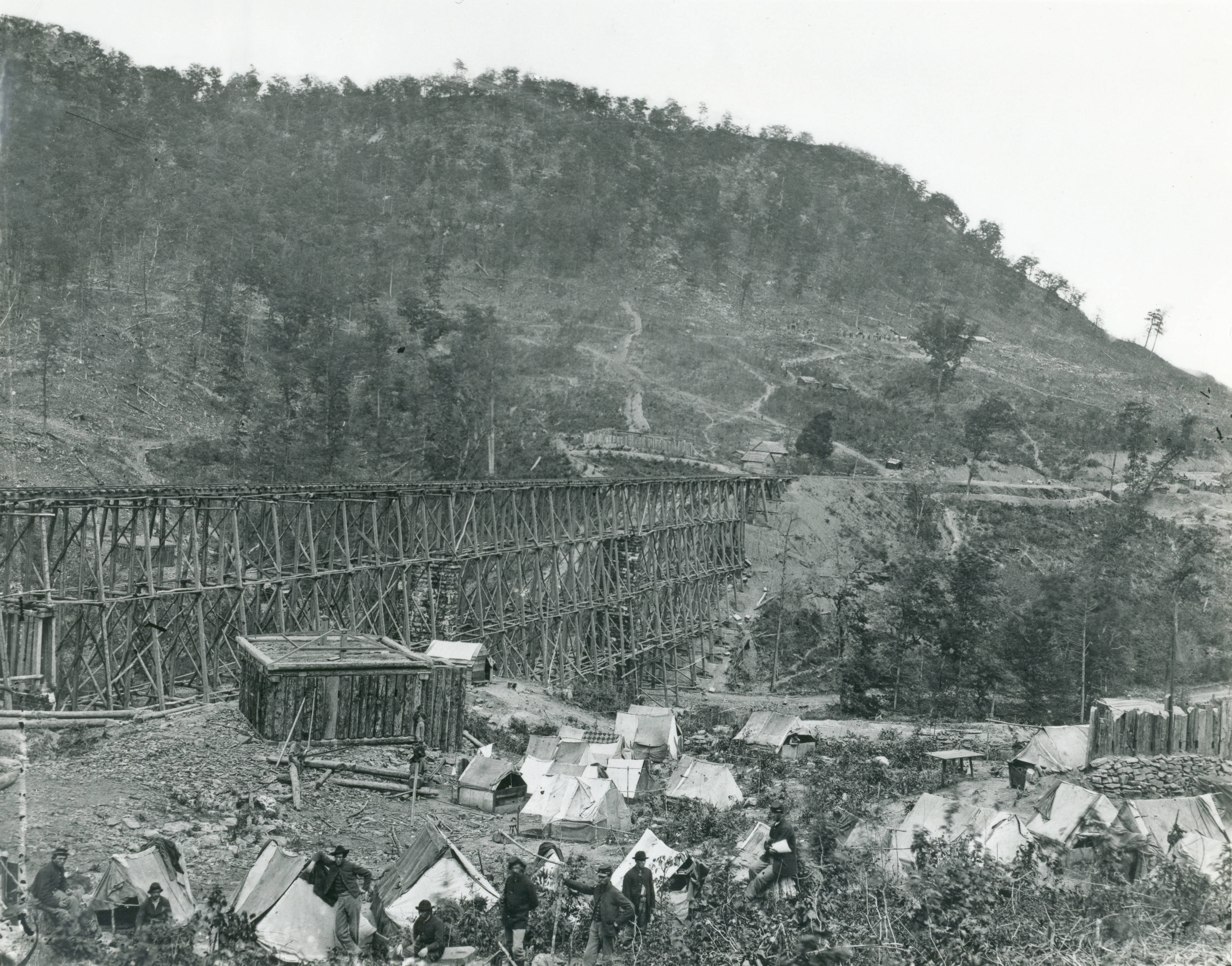
1 1864 US Military Railroads bridge across Running Water creek near Whiteside, Tenn. Four-tiered, 780-foot-long railroad trestle bridge built by the 1st Michigan Engineers with guard camp also shown.

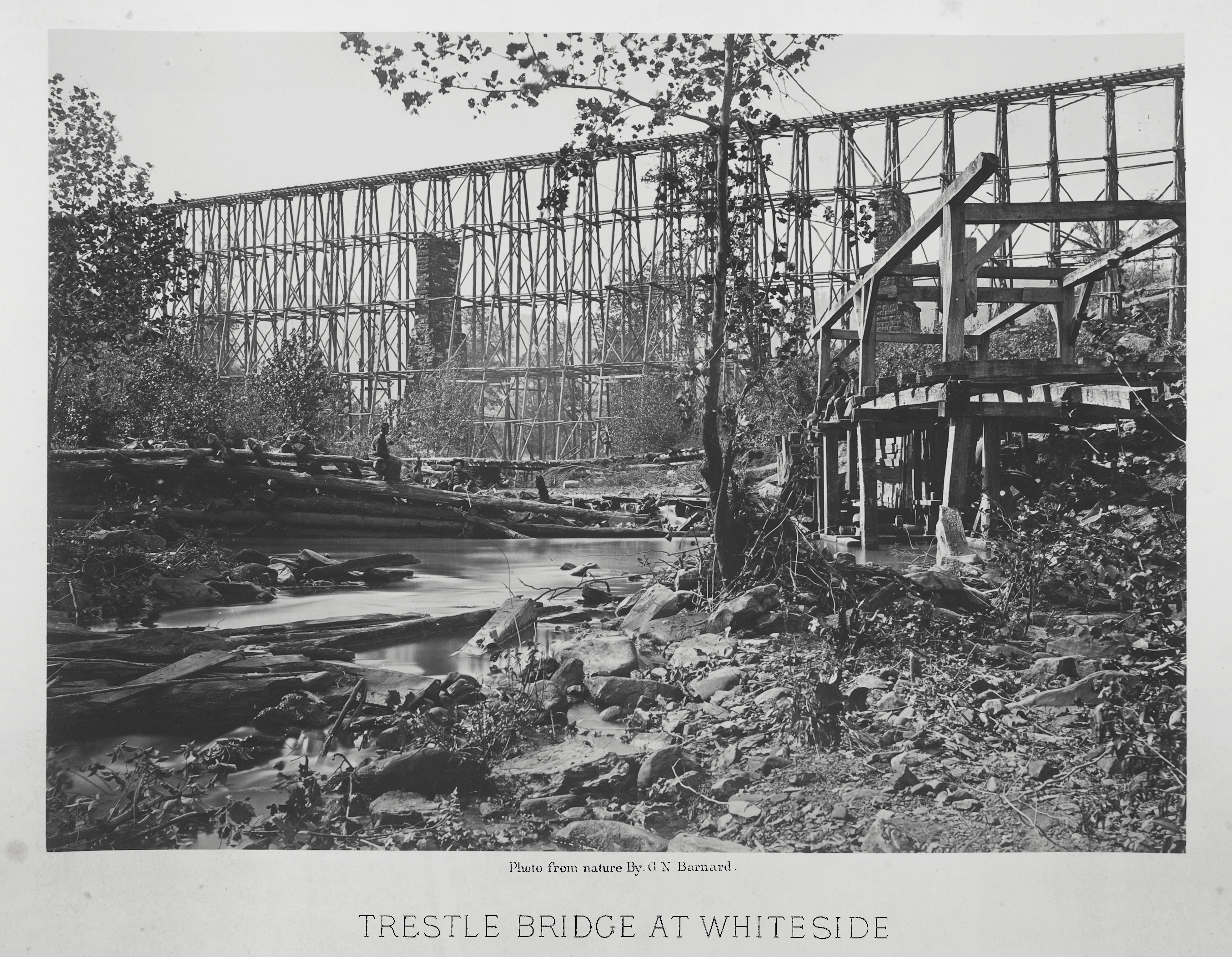
2 USMRR Whiteside trestle bridge picture by Barnard

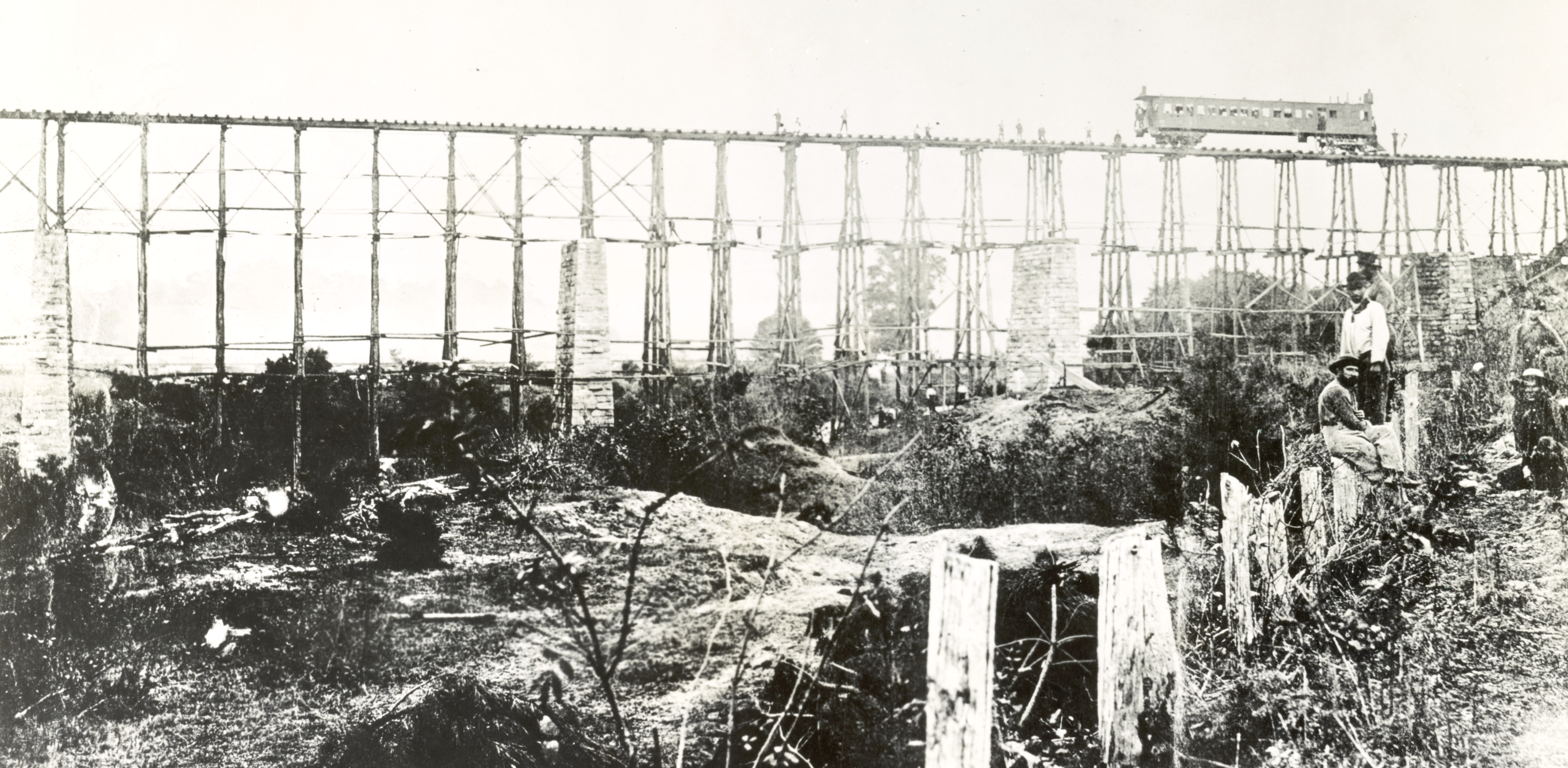
3 Railcar on civil war era railroad bridge rebuilt by Wright at Running Water, TN

==== Nashville and Northwestern Railroad ====
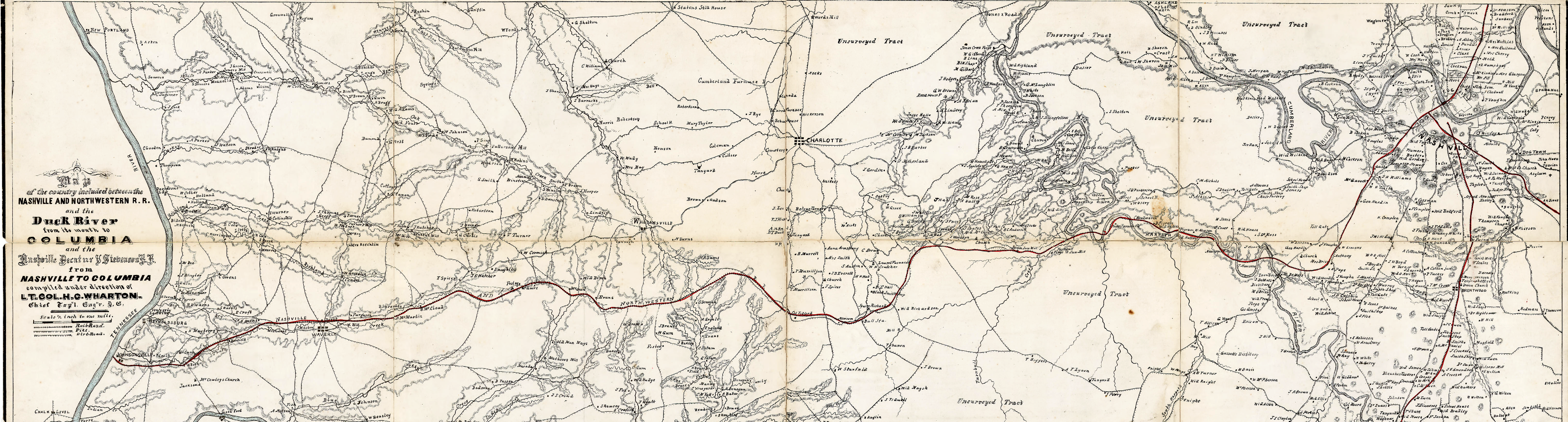
1864 USMRR Nashville and Northwestern railroad map by Lt. Harry C. Wharton, Veteran Volunteer Engineers (West Point class of 1862)

In November 1863, Union troops occupied Kingston Springs, Tennessee to serve a base for constructing the Nashville and Northwestern Railroad which would connect Nashville with the major supply depot at Johnsonville on the Tennessee River.

===== Impressed labor and the colored troops =====
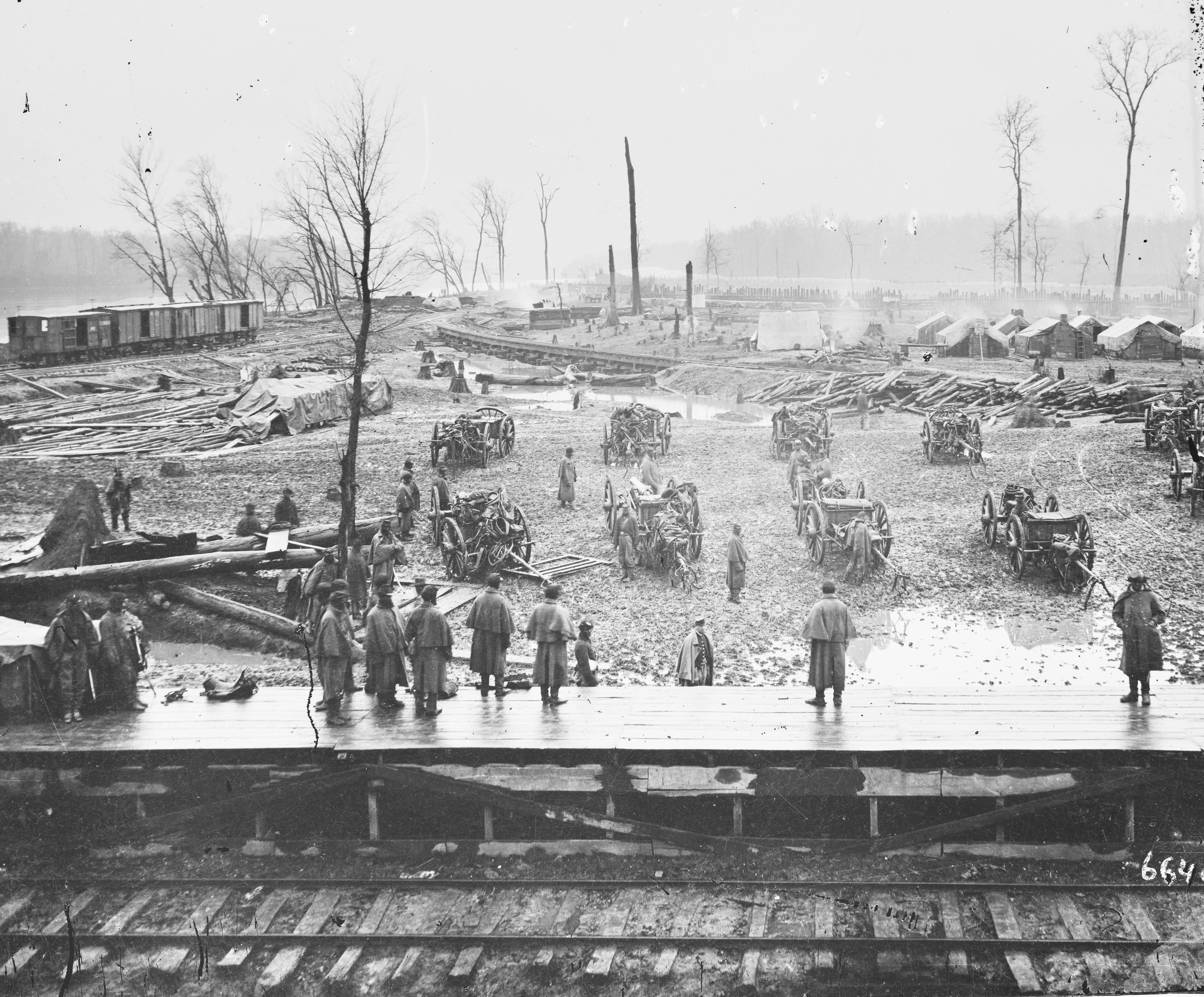
U.S. Military Railroad construction corps base for Nashville and Northwestern Railroad with the 12th and 13th United States Colored Infantry Regiments in Johnsonville, TN

Colonel Reuben D. Mussey Jr. recruited African-American soldiers for the Union Army, being detailed to act as a commissioner for organizing black troops with headquarters at Nashville. On June 14, 1864, Mussey was appointed colonel of the 100th U.S. Colored Infantry.

==== Atlanta Campaign ====
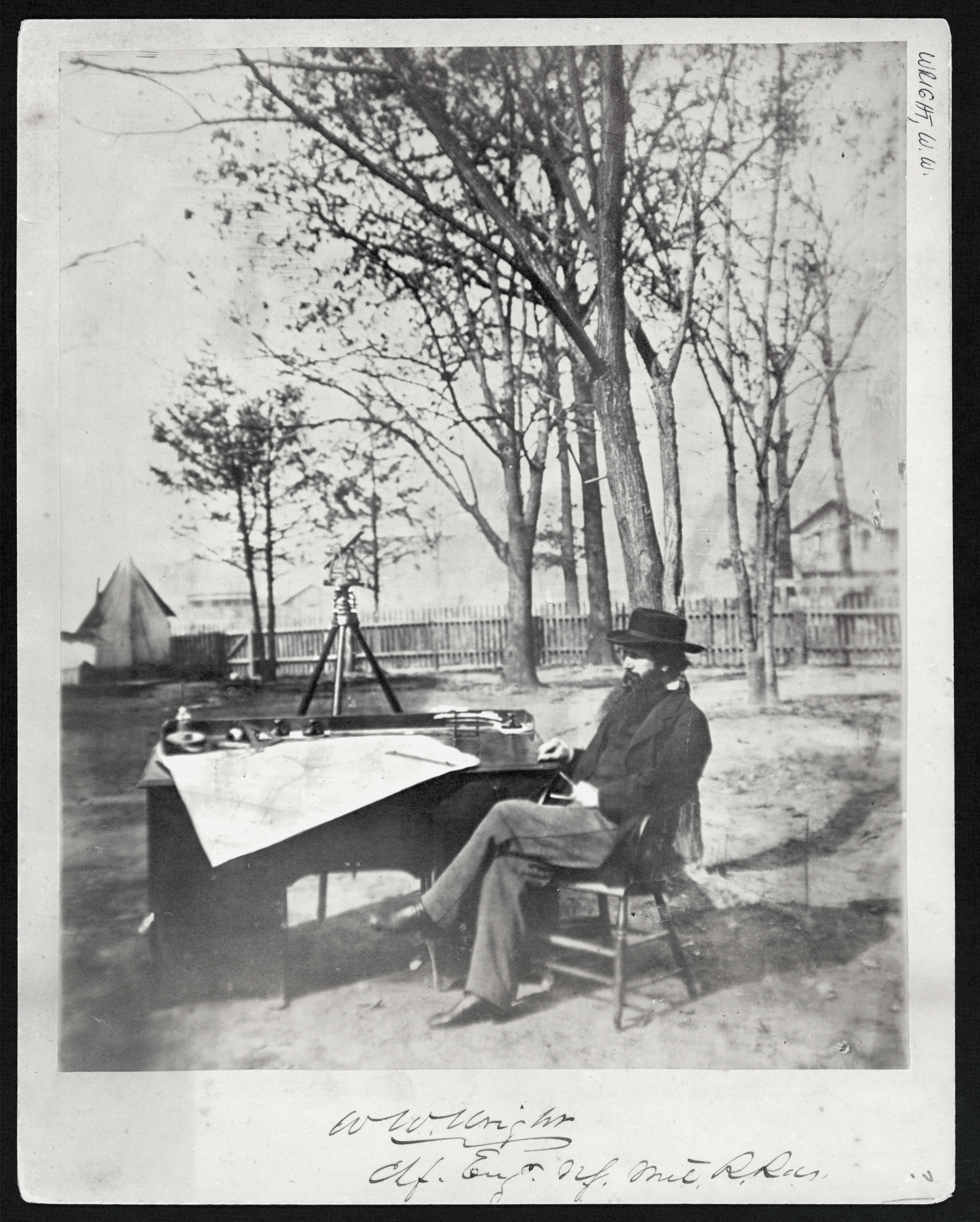
Chief Engineer Wright seated at an engineering table with map and theodolite

In February 1864, Grant appointed McCallum as general manager of all military railways in the West and he immediately appointed Wright chief engineer of the construction corps. Wright organized the construction corps into six divisions one of which he commanded in Virginia at Acquia creek. Three new divisions were to be mobilized to support the railroad rebuilding work assigned to Wright who now commanded almost six thousand men. The Corps headquarters was the residence of the division engineer and his assistants. Each division had subdivisions for bridges and track. McCallum's objective was to mobilize a military railroad to supply Sherman's Atlanta campaign in 1864 using 200 locomotives and 3,000 pieces of rolling stock.

The Nashville and Chattanooga Railroad was the primary supply line for the Atlanta campaign. Wright replaced the old "U" rail with new "T" rail. Often raids forced Wright to rebuild bridges several times, one had to be rebuilt five times. Just prior to Sherman starting his campaign, 130 freight cars a day arrived in Chattanooga carrying food, ammunition, and supplies only; troops and livestock were marched in. The Atlanta campaign saw the railroad being used for hospital trains, eight cars in each, carrying as many as three hundred passengers.

Sherman's campaign depended on bringing supplies over railroad lines maintained by Wright's construction corps. This four hundred and seventy-mile rail link was composed of three railroads, the Nashville and Chattanooga Railroad, the Louisville and Nashville Railroad, and the Western and Atlantic Railroad. Sherman noted this contribution when he said that this single rail line "supplied an army of 100,000 men and 35,000 horses for a period of 196 days" in the 1864 campaign.

Wright's task in rebuilding the Western and Atlantic Railroad was the most difficult, constructing eleven bridges on the line including the eight hundred foot Chattahoochee River bridge in just six days. Wright rebuilt the Oostenaula River bridge in seventy-two hours and started the rebuild while the bridge was still burning. He rebuilt the 600-foot bridge over the Etowah River in five days. Much of this work was supervised by Eben C. Smeed, one of Herman Haupt's assistants from Virginia.

==== Savannah Campaign ====
At the close of 1864, Wright was ordered by General Sherman to Savannah, where he arrived with his construction corps of 1,200 men on January 13, 1865, and was put in charge of the military railroad work in that vicinity. He was present with General Sherman at the time of the negotiations with General Johnston, which closed the war. Wright was replaced by Col Joseph Fulton Boyd (1832–1907) on July 1, 1865. Eben C. Smeed remained engineer of repairs.

Wright left the Army in 1866 as chief engineer of military railroads of the Division of the Mississippi.

== Postbellum career ==
After the war, Wright resumed his involvement in the railroad industry.

=== Kansas Pacific Railway ===
In 1866, Wright left the Military Railroad Construction Corps and became general superintendent and chief engineer of the Kansas Pacific Railway Company then known as the Union Pacific railway-Eastern Division, with headquarters at Wyandotte, Kansas part of present-day Kansas City, Kansas. He was to survey routes for a proposed extension to the Pacific coast. The US Congress had approved legislation in 1866, authorizing the railway to extend the railroad westward along the Smoky Hill River to Denver, Colorado. It also required the railroad to join the Union Pacific railroad no more than fifty miles west of Denver, a distance of 394 miles. The railroad was completed by the end of 1867.

=== Mays Landing & Egg Harbor City Railroad ===
Wright was appointed chief engineer by the Pennsylvania railroad to locate the line in May 1871.

== Later life ==
When Wright returned to the U.S., his bright career seemed to take a downward turn. In his years abroad, he had become an alcoholic. He took lodgings in a room on Walnut Street in Philadelphia and subsisted by cleaning offices. The night before he died, Wright had been arrested for drunken behavior in public. He was sent to Moyamensing Prison in Philadelphia and was found dead the next morning, March 9, 1882. He was buried beside his parents in Adams County. Wright never married.
