= Hauptman =

Hauptman is a surname. (Note: Not to be confused with the similarly-spelled Hauptmann (surname).)

Notable people with this surname include:

- Andrej Hauptman (born 1975), Slovenian cyclist
- Andrew Hauptman (born 1969), American business executive, philanthropist, and civic leader
- Bruno Hauptman (1899–1936), German-born carpenter, executed for the kidnapping and murder of Charles Lindbergh's baby
- Dušan Hauptman (born 1960), Slovenian basketball player
- Herbert A. Hauptman (1917–2011), American mathematician and Nobel laureate
- Jodi Hauptman (born 1964), American art historian and curator
- Judith Hauptman (born 1943), American feminist Talmudic scholar
- Katherine Hauptman (born 1970), Swedish archaeologist and museum researcher
- Kyle S. Hauptman (born 1973), American civil servant
- Laurence M. Hauptman, American historian
- Micah Hauptman (born 1973), American actor
- Susan Hauptman (1947–2015), American artist
- William Hauptman (born 1942), American writer

== Other uses ==
- Hauptman-Woodward Medical Research Institute, a biomedical research facility in Buffalo, New York, U.S.

== See also ==
- Hauptmann, an officer rank in the armies of Germany, Austria, and Switzerland
- Hauptmann (disambiguation)
