= Hauptmann (surname) =

Hauptmann is a German surname. Notable people with this surname include:

== Sports ==
- Caylin Hauptmann (born 1991), American football player
- Marius Hauptmann (born 1999), German footballer
- Niklas Hauptmann (born 1996), German footballer
- Ralf Hauptmann (born 1968), German footballer

== Writing ==
- Elisabeth Hauptmann (1897–1973), German writer
- Gaby Hauptmann (born 1957), German journalist and writer
- Gerhart Hauptmann (1862–1946), German dramatist and novelist
- Helmut Hauptmann (born 1928), German writer

== Other ==
Listed alphabetically by given name

- Alex Hauptmann, American academic
- Alfred Hauptmann (1881–1948), German-Jewish psychiatrist and neurologist
- Anna Milder-Hauptmann (1785–1838), Constantinople-born operatic soprano
- Harald Hauptmann (1936–2018), German archaeologist
- Mark Hauptmann (born 1984), German politician
- Moritz Hauptmann (1792–1868), German music theorist, teacher and composer
- Richard Hauptmann (1899–1936), German-born carpenter, executed for the kidnapping and murder of Charles Lindbergh's baby

== See also ==
- Hauptmann (disambiguation)
- Hauptman
