= Potomac Creek Bridge =

Bridge built in 1842

Coordinates: 38°21.401′N 77°24.533′W

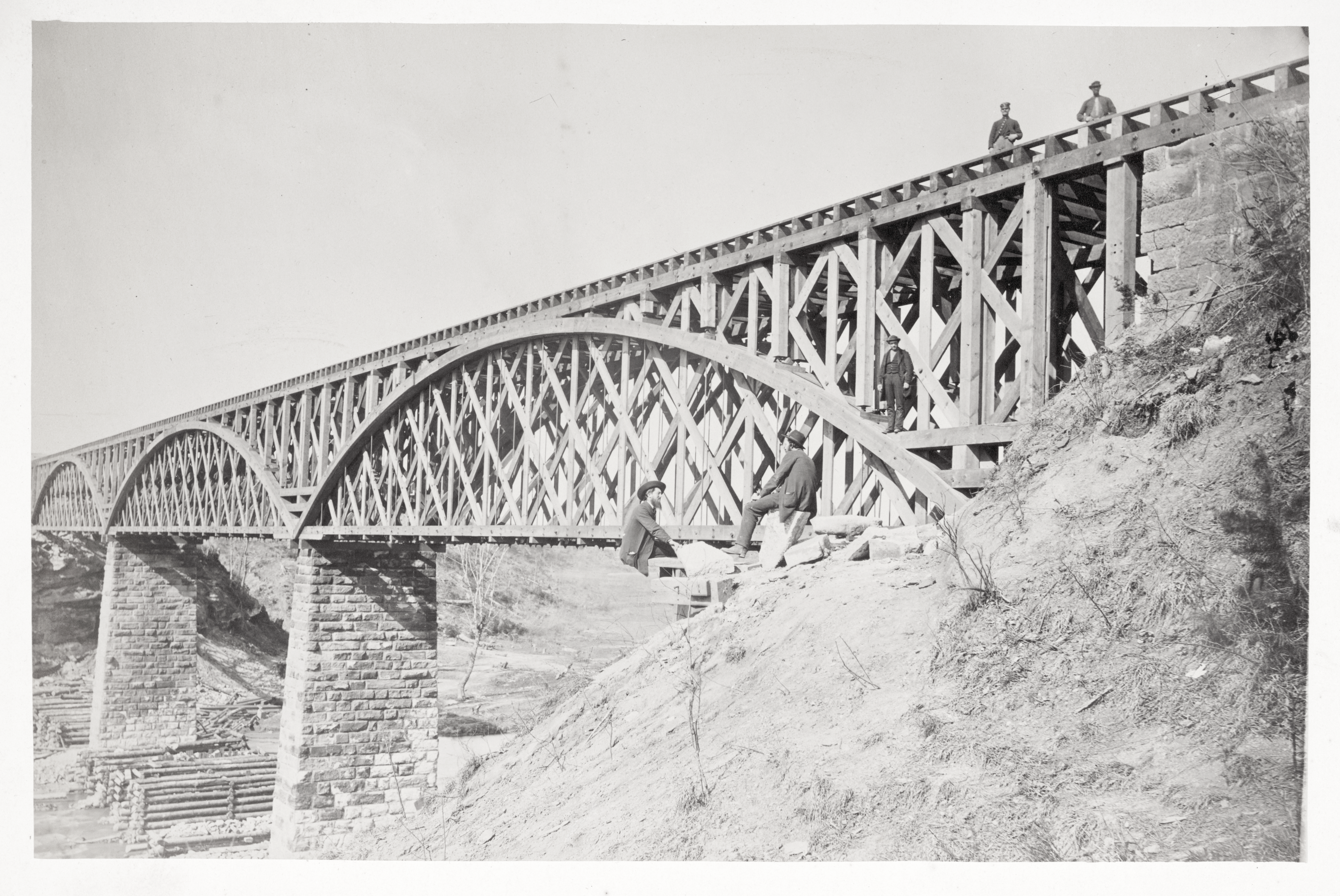
1862 US Military Railroad Rebuilding the high bridge across Potomac Creek, Adna Anderson seated center-left and Eben C. Smeed seated center-right.

The Potomac Creek Bridge (Potomac Creek Viaduct or Potomac Run Bridge) was first built in 1842 by the Richmond, Fredericksburg and Potomac Railroad across the Potomac Creek in Stafford County, Virginia, United States.

During the American Civil War, the bridge offered the only rail access between the Potomac River and the cities of Fredericksburg and Richmond, making it a vital supply line to both the Confederate and Union armies. In the spring of 1862 as Confederate forces retreated to Fredericksburg the bridge was destroyed.

In 1862, the United States Military Railroad was formed under the command of General Herman Haupt. One of the first tasks was to restore the 13-mile stretch of railroad from Aquia Creek to Falmouth that was destroyed by the retreating Confederate Army. In May 1862, Herman Haupt supervised common Union infantrymen from the Army of the Rappahannock in harvesting two million feet of local lumber to construct the Potomac Creek Bridge, accomplishing this task in just nine working days. President Abraham Lincoln, on a visit on May 28, 1862, observed "That man Haupt has built a bridge four hundred feet long and one hundred feet high, across Potomac Creek, on which loaded trains are passing every hour, and upon my word, gentlemen, there is nothing in it but cornstalks and beanpoles." The Haupt bridge stood until June 1863. The Union Army built as many as four railroad bridges atop the same abutment over the remaining years of the war. Around 1899, the bridge was replaced and the south abutment and its approaching right-of-way were abandoned.

== Images ==
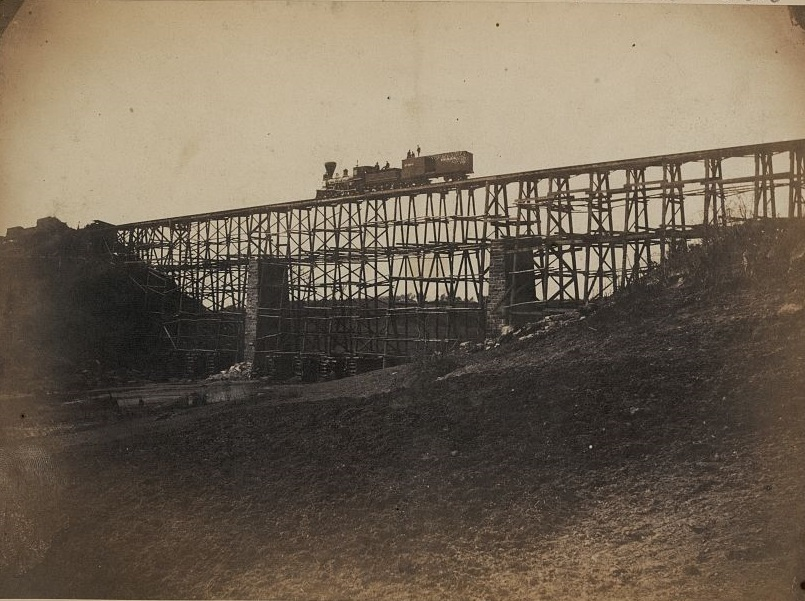
The bridge of 'cornstalks and beanpoles', a temporary trestle over the abutments.

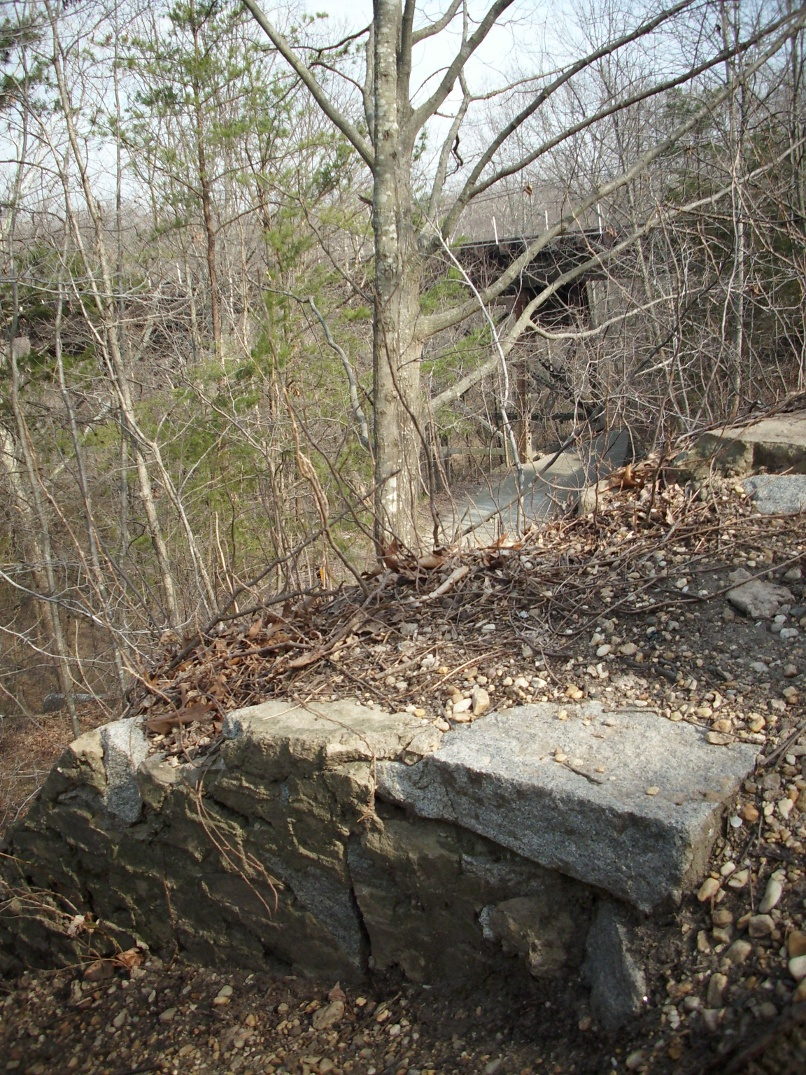
Top of the abandoned south abutment with the replacement steel bridge now owned about CSX
