= Kate Smeed Cross =

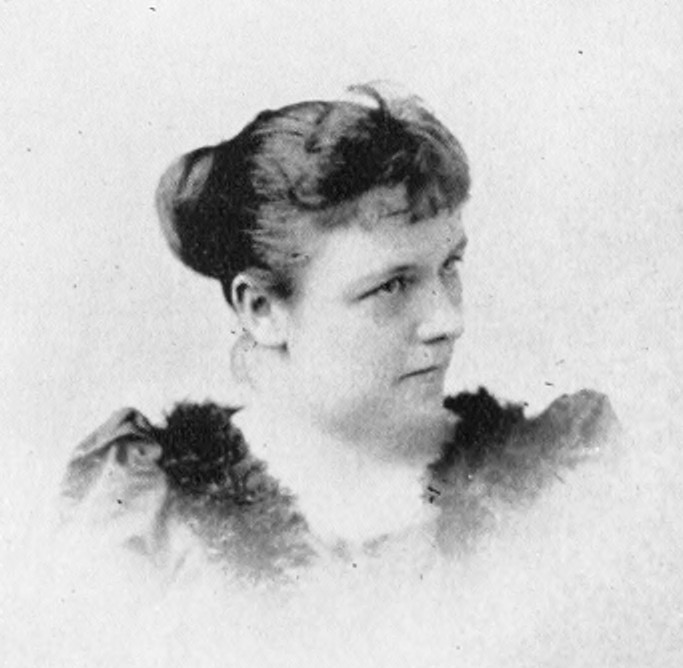
Kate Smeed Cross, "A Woman of the Century"

Katherine Smeed Cross (November 18, 1859 - September 11, 1943) was an American social leader.

== Early life ==
Katherine (nickname, "Kate") Smeed was born near Philadelphia, Pennsylvania, on November 18, 1859, the daughter of Colonel Eben C. Smeed (1830-1892), a civil engineer with the Union Pacific Railroad, and Mary A. Smeed (1833-1876). In 1869, she moved with her parents to Lawrence, Kansas, where the next seven years were spent in school and studying in the University of Kansas.

In 1876, she returned to Philadelphia and devoted herself industriously to the study of music, art and the great exhibition.

== Career ==
She held leadership positions in most art, musical, and literary organizations in Emporia. She was a member of the Episcopal Church.

Some of the finest classic musical entertainments given in Emporia were given under her direction, she herself taking leading parts in such operas as the Bohemian Girl and showing herself possessed of histrionic ability.

== Personal life ==
In 1880, she returned to her Kansas home and in that year, she married Charles Sumner Cross (1858-1898), a banker and business man of Emporia, Kansas, where in their home, "Elmwood," the Crosses, with their daughter, Mary Kathryn Cross Gourlay (1885-1980), lived and dispensed hospitality. They divorced in 1895 and Smeed moved to California.

She died on September 11, 1943, Orange County, California, and is buried at Fairhaven Memorial Park, Santa Ana, California.
