= Hauptmann (disambiguation) =

Hauptmann is the German word for captain.

Hauptmann may also refer to:

== Entertainment ==
- Hauptmann Deutschland, a fictional character appearing in Marvel Comics
- Hauptmann Florian von der Mühle, a 1968 East German film
- Der Hauptmann, a 2017 German film (English title, The Captain)
- Der Hauptmann von Köpenick, various films, plays, and television shows about Wilhelm Voigt

== People ==
- Hauptmann (surname), includes a list of notable people with this surname
- der Hauptmann von Köpenick, nickname of Wilhelm Voigt (1849–1922), German con man and impostor

== Science ==
- 8381 Hauptmann, a minor planet discovered in 1992
- Hauptmann (crater), a crater on Mercury

== See also ==
- Hauptman
