= Benjamin Haupt =

German politician

Member of the Landtag of Rhineland-Palatinate
- Incumbent
- Assumed office 18 May 2026

Personal details
- Party: Alternative for Germany

Benjamin Haupt is a German politician who was elected member of the Landtag of Rhineland-Palatinate in 2026. He has served as group leader of the Alternative for Germany in the city council of Speyer since 2019.
