= Haupt (mountain) =

Mountain in switzerland

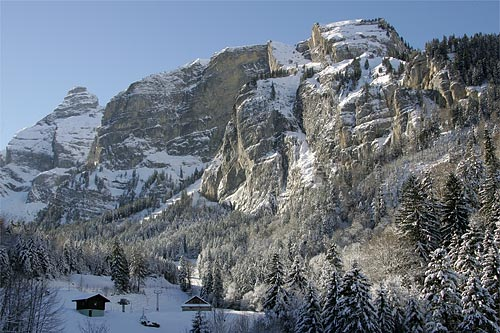
- The Haupt (summit on the left) seen from Stöckalp

Highest point
- Elevation: 2,313 m (7,589 ft)
- Prominence: 145 m (476 ft)
- Parent peak: Glogghüs
- Coordinates: 46°47′13″N 8°15′10″E

Geography
- Location within Switzerland
- Location: Obwalden, Switzerland
- Parent range: Urner Alps

The Haupt is a mountain of the Urner Alps, located between the Klein Melchtal and the Melchtal in the canton of Obwalden. Its east side consists of steep limestone cliffs overlooking Stöckalp and Melchsee-Frutt. On its west side it overlooks the Älggi-Alp.
