= Herman Haupt =

American railway engineer (1817–1905)

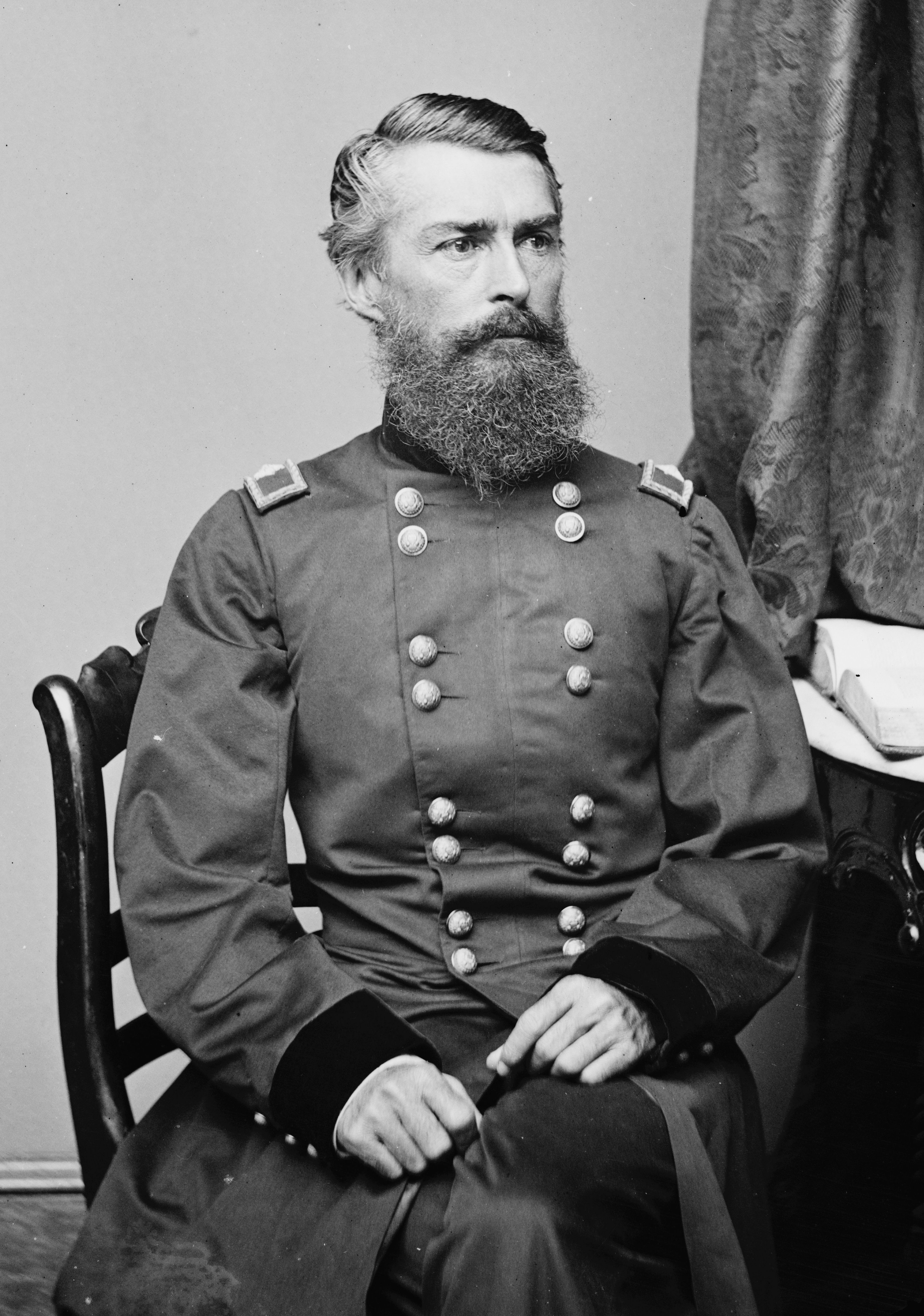
- Colonel Herman Haupt
- Born: March 26, 1817; Philadelphia, Pennsylvania, U.S.
- Died: December 14, 1905 (aged 88); Jersey City, New Jersey, U.S.
- Burial place: West Laurel Hill Cemetery; Bala Cynwyd, Pennsylvania, U.S.
- Military career
- Allegiance: United States
- Branch: Union army
- Service years: 1835; 1862–1863
- Rank: Colonel
- Commands: United States Military Railroad
- Conflicts: American Civil War

Herman Haupt (March 26, 1817 – December 14, 1905) was an American civil engineer, railway engineer, and railroad executive. He worked for several railroad companies including as general superintendent of the Pennsylvania Railroad from 1849 to 1851 and superintendent of the New York and Erie Railroad in 1854. He was a professor of mathematics and engineering at Pennsylvania College and patented the Haupt Truss used in bridge construction. He worked with John Edgar Thomson on the Horseshoe Curve and Gallitzin Tunnels in the Allegheny Mountains and as chief engineer during construction of the Hoosac Tunnel in Western Massachusetts.

He served as a colonel in the Union army during the American Civil War in charge of the United States Military Railroad from 1862 to 1863. He quickly constructed and repaired bridges and railroad lines to efficiently transport Union troops, wounded soldiers, and supplies especially in support of the Second Battle of Bull Run and the Battle of Gettysburg.

He was promoted to Brigadier general for his service during the Northern Virginia campaign. However, he bristled at interference from other Union army leaders into railroad operations and demanded flexibility to return to his personal railroad investments. He refused to formally accept the commission to Brigadier general and was relieved of his role and replaced with Daniel McCallum.

He continued to work for several railroad companies including as general manager for the Richmond and Danville Railroad and the Northern Pacific Railroad.

== Early life and education ==
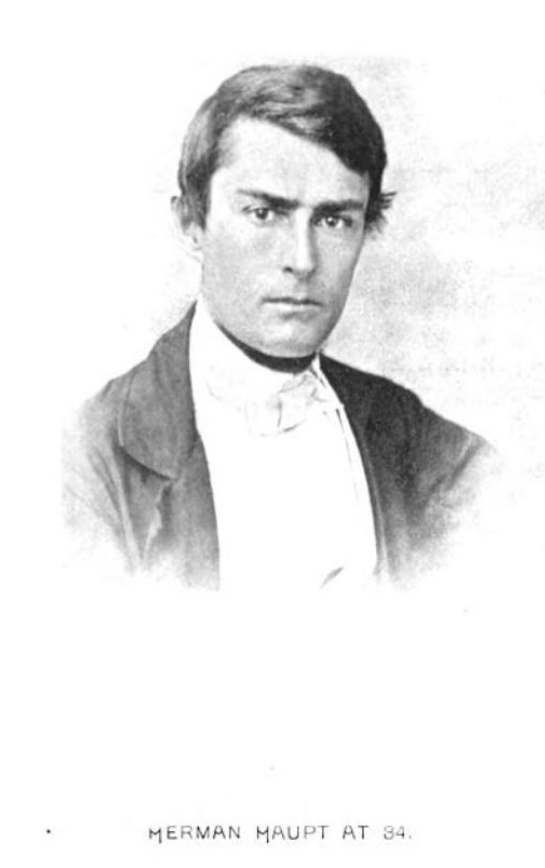
Herman Haupt at age 34

Haupt was born in Philadelphia, Pennsylvania, on March 26, 1817, to Jacob and Anna Margaretta Wiall Haupt. His father died when Herman was 11 years old, leaving the family in financial difficulty. Herman worked part-time to pay his school tuition and was appointed to the United States Military Academy by President Andrew Jackson in 1831. He graduated in 1835, was commissioned a second lieutenant, and entered the 2nd infantry.

He obtained a master's degree from Pennsylvania College.

== Career ==
Haupt disliked the discipline of the military and resigned his Army commission on September 30, 1835, to accept a job under Henry Roe Campbell as Assistant Engineer in the surveys of the Norristown and Allentown Railroad and of the Norristown & Valley Railroad. In June 1836, he was appointed Assistant Engineer in the state service and surveyed the line from Gettysburg to the Potomac across the South Mountain, a right-of-way that became part of the Western Maryland Railroad. In 1839, he worked as Principal Assistant Engineer on the York & Wrightsville Railroad.

In 1839, Haupt patented a bridge construction technique called the Haupt Truss. The Bunker Hill Covered Bridge in North Carolina was designed by Haupt in 1840. The Thetford Center Covered Bridge in Vermont is another example of the Haupt Truss used in bridge construction.

From 1840 to 1841, Haupt worked as a professor of mathematics and engineering at Pennsylvania College and as principal of Oak Ridge Select Academy. He served as a trustee of Pennsylvania College from 1859 to 1873.

He drew the attention of John Edgar Thomson who became chief engineer of the Pennsylvania Railroad. Haupt returned to the railroad business in 1847, accepted a position as construction engineer on the Pennsylvania Railroad, and as general superintendent from 1849 to 1851. Haupt worked with Thomson on the Horseshoe Curve and the Gallitzin Tunnels.

From 1851 to 1853, Haupt was the chief engineer of the Southern Railroad of Mississippi. He worked as the superintendent of the New York and Erie Railroad beginning in 1854. In 1856, the city councils of Philadelphia appointed him director of the Pennsylvania Railroad.

He invested in coal, real estate, and timber, and became moderately wealthy selling these commodities to his employer. He was brought into an investment for the Troy & Greenfield Railroad by Edward W. Serrell. However, the investors failed to inform Haupt about the full financials of the project and he did not do full diligence before taking on the project. Haupt invested $20,000 in the project and the firm of Serrell, Haupt & Company was formed in 1856. He soon discovered that Serrell and the other investors could not raise their portion of the promised capital and he became the only one fully invested in the project. He was able to bring in new investors from his connections in the Pennsylvania Railroad and other Philadelphia-based investors. He was the chief engineer on the five-mile (8 km) Hoosac Tunnel through the Berkshires in Western Massachusetts from 1856 to 1861.

=== Civil War ===
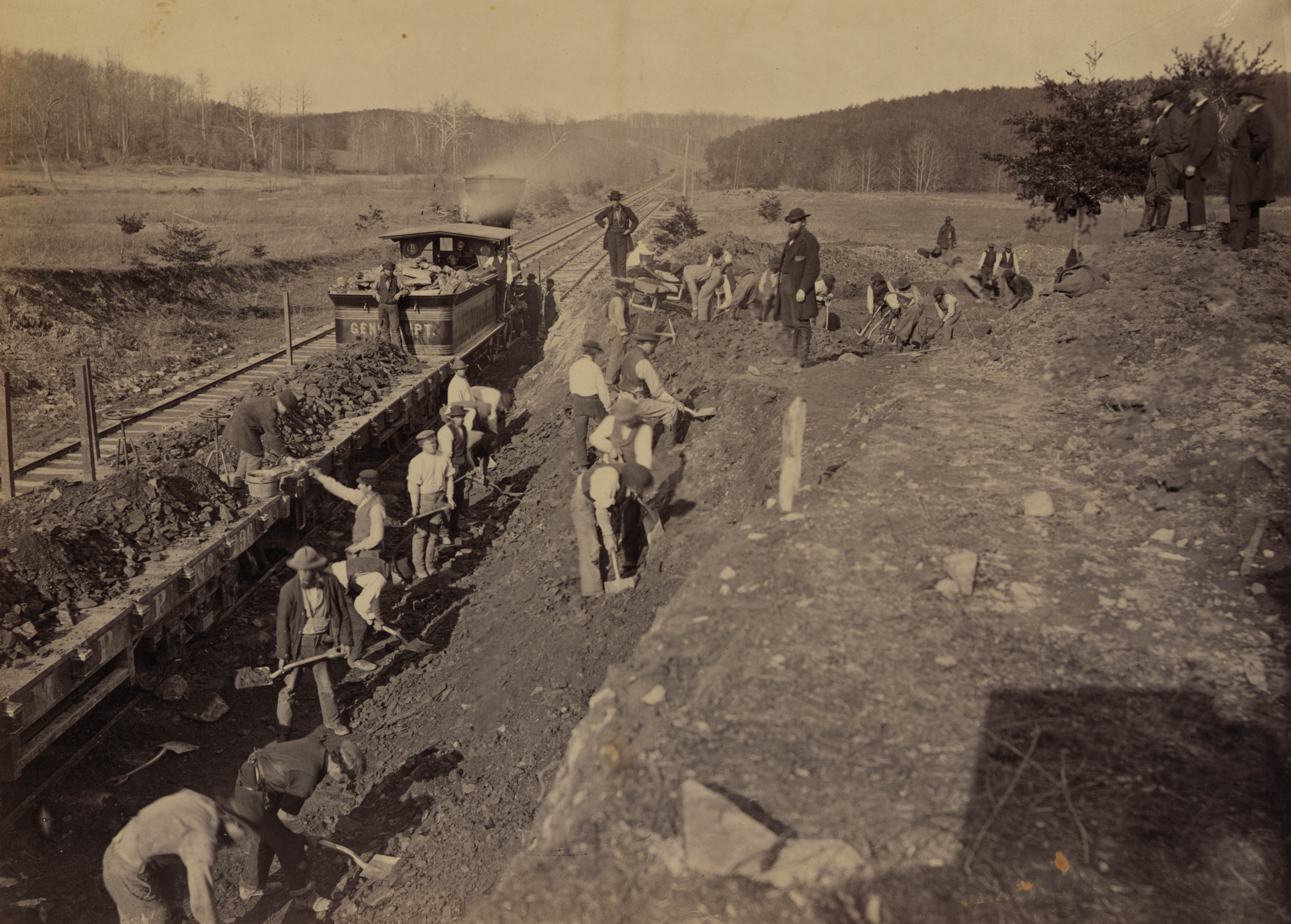
The locomotive "General Haupt" being used for work detail while its namesake, Herman Haupt, stands on the hill to the right inspecting railway work near Bull Run in 1863

In the spring of 1862, the U.S. War Department organized a new bureau responsible for constructing and operating military railroads in the United States. On April 27, Haupt was appointed chief of the bureau by Secretary of War Edwin M. Stanton, as a colonel and aide-de-camp to major general Irvin McDowell.

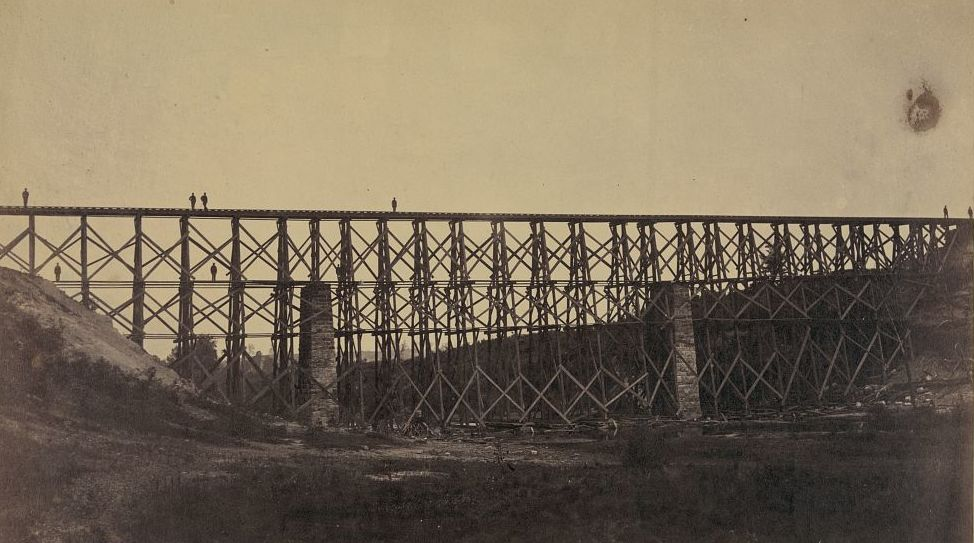
The Potomac Creek Bridge was restored by Haupt in under two weeks after damage by Confederate forces

Haupt repaired and fortified war-damaged railroad lines in the vicinity of Washington. He built blockhouses to guard strategically important bridges from Confederate attacks. He armed and trained workers to protect trains and tracks. Among his most challenging assignments was restoring the strategic Richmond, Fredericksburg and Potomac Railroad line, including the Potomac Creek Bridge, after its partial destruction by Confederate forces. Despite an inexperienced workforce and other serious impediments, Haupt had the line back in use in under two weeks. President Abraham Lincoln was impressed with Haupt's work there. In a visit on May 28, 1862, he observed: "That man Haupt has built a bridge four hundred feet long and one hundred feet high, across Potomac Creek, on which loaded trains are passing every hour, and upon my word, gentlemen, there is nothing in it but cornstalks and beanpoles."

During the Second Battle of Bull Run, Haupt cleared the inefficiencies on the Orange and Alexandria Railroad and was able to supply 20,000 of the 90,000 Union troops involved in the battle. Although he did not personally support the Maryland Campaign, his agents provided support and the trains worked successfully.

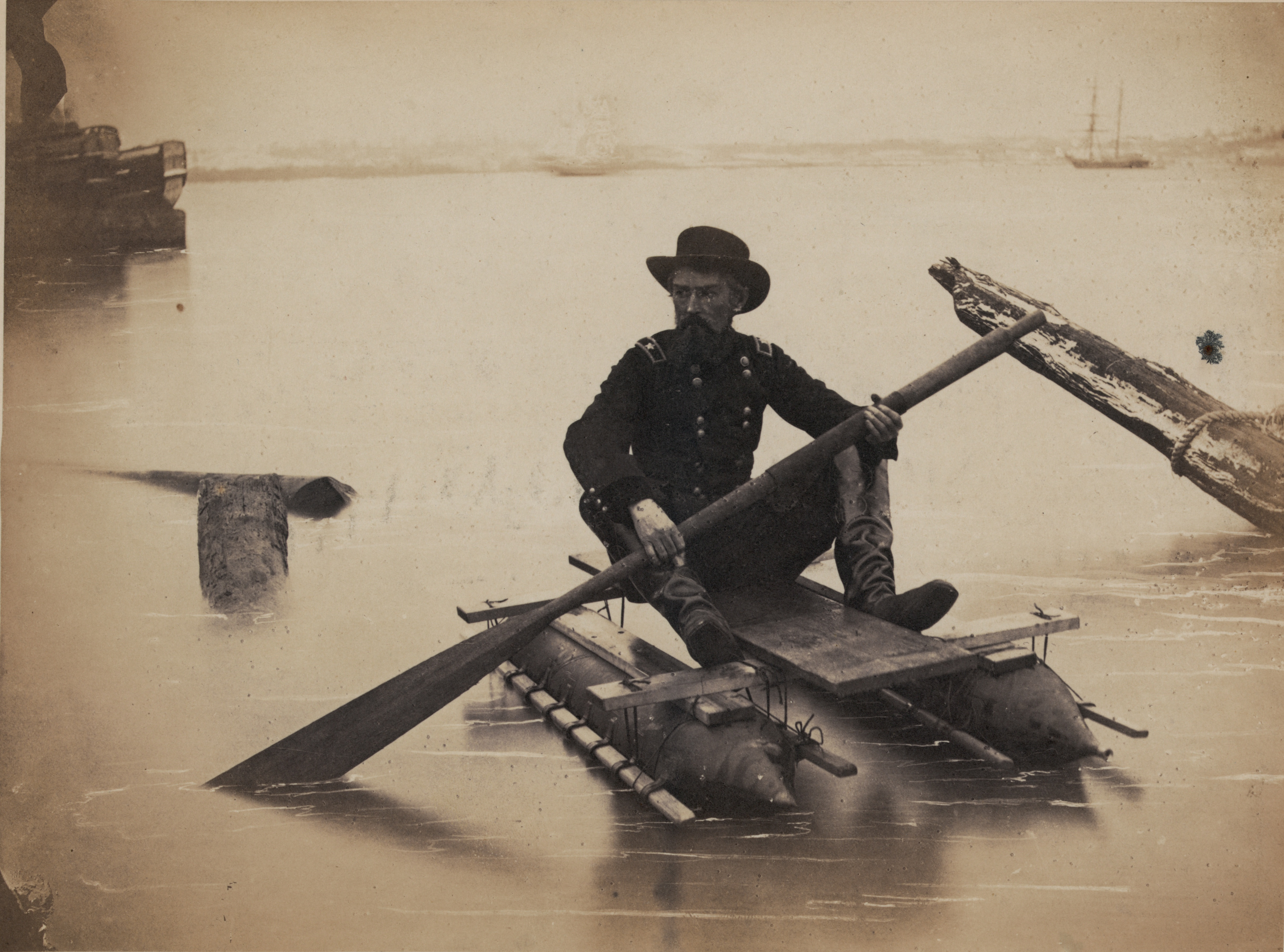
Haupt on a raft made of pontoons and wooden planks

Haupt was promoted to brigadier general on September 5, 1862, for meritorious service during Army campaigns in Virginia. He worked with Gen. Daniel McCallum, a fellow railroad man and later became good friends with John Henry Devereux, the Superintendent of the United States Military Railroad at Alexandria, Virginia and later General Superintendent of the Cleveland & Pittsburgh Railroad.

He was particularly effective in supporting the Gettysburg campaign, conducted in an area he knew well from his youth. His hastily organized trains kept the Union Army well supplied, and he organized the returning trains to carry thousands of Union wounded to hospitals. The Hanover Branch Railroad and the Gettysburg Railroad were under military control from July 9 to August 1, 1863, and transported 15,580 wounded men in that time. After the Battle of Gettysburg, Haupt boarded one of his trains and arrived at the White House on July 6, 1863, becoming the first to inform President Lincoln that General Robert E. Lee's defeated Confederate army was not being pursued vigorously by Union Major General George G. Meade.

Haupt developed two main principles for operations; the military should never interfere with the efficient running of the railroad and that rolling stock should be emptied and returned promptly to enable their re-use as transport. He chafed at dealing with other Union army commanders. He did not like John Pope who knew nothing of railroads. He confronted Ambrose Burnside who bristled at taking orders from someone of lower rank. He was impatient with George B. McClellan whom he believed did nothing. He constantly bothered Secretary of War Stanton to issue an order forbidding interference with the military railroads. When he finally received that order, he flaunted it in the face of those that would interfere with railroad operations.

He refused any compensation from the War Department except for reimbursement of expenses. He did not wear a uniform and resisted working on the Sabbath.

He preferred civilian crews over soldiers, including those consisting of former slaves known as contraband. His Construction Corps had 300 men divided into 10-man squads by June 1862, and was later enlarged to include bridge-builders, then construction of freight cars, barracks, wharves, warehouses, etcetera. Its range of operation was extended to Tennessee and it accompanied Sherman's thrust through Georgia under the direction of Colonel William Wierman Wright and division engineer Eben C. Smeed.

Haupt experimented with bridge demolition using "torpedoes", as mines were called at the time, inserted in holes drilled in trusses. He also discussed in a November 1862 report various methods of destroying locomotives, determining that firing a cannonball through the boiler rendered it irreparable, while locomotives with fireboxes drained then fired could be repaired. He also tested a lightweight 2-clamp "rail-twister" invented by his subordinate Eben C. Smeed, for use in raids behind enemy lines.

Haupt chafed under the inability to conduct his private civil engineering projects while serving in the military and resented the interference of other Union generals with military railroad operations. On September 1, 1863, Secretary of War Stanton issued an order that all commissions must be accepted within 5 days or be vacated. Haupt refused to accept his commission unconditionally as he feared that he could be sent anywhere in the United States and unable to return to Massachusetts and address his financial investments in the Hoosac Tunnel. Haupt was relieved by Stanton on September 14, 1863, and the role was transitioned to Daniel McCallum.

=== Post war career ===
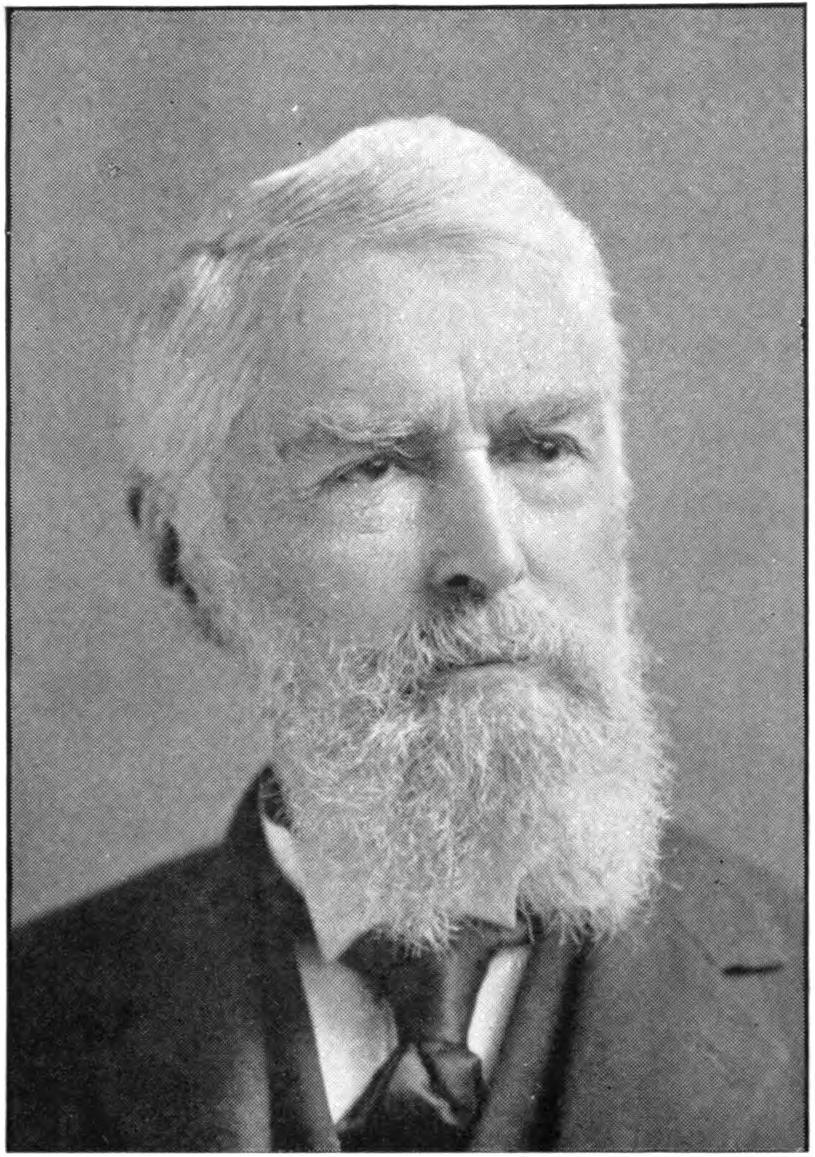
Haupt in 1904

After his war service, Haupt returned to railroad, bridge, pipeline, and tunnel construction. In 1867, he was invited to present his use of power machinery in mining and tunneling to the Royal Cornwall Polytechnic Society in England. He worked as General Manager and director of the Richmond and Danville Railroad then was the general manager of Piedmont Air-Line Railway (from Richmond, Virginia, to Atlanta, Georgia), 1872 to 1876. In 1878, he was hired by the Pennsylvania Transportation Company to study the possibility of developing a crude petroleum pipeline from the Allegheny Valley to tidewater. He was general manager of the transcontinental Northern Pacific Railroad, 1881 to 1884; president of the Dakota and Great Southern Railroad, 1885 to 1886. He served as president of the General Compressed Air Company.

Haupt became wealthy from investments in railroads, mining, and Pennsylvania real estate, but eventually lost most of his fortune, in part due to political complications involving the completion of the Hoosac Tunnel. Haupt authored several papers and books: Hints on Bridge Building (1840), The General Theory of Bridge Construction (1851), Plan for the Improvement of the Ohio River (1855), Military Bridges (1864) and Reminiscences (1901).

He was elected as a member to the American Philosophical Society in 1871. He was a member of the Pennsylvania Historical Society and the Franklin Institute.

== Personal life ==
In 1838, he married Ann Cecelia Keller, and together they had 11 children including the civil engineer Lewis M. Haupt.

Haupt died of a heart attack on December 14, 1905, in Jersey City, New Jersey, while traveling on the Pennsylvania Railroad to Washington D.C. He was interred at West Laurel Hill Cemetery in Bala Cynwyd, Pennsylvania.

== Publications ==
- Hints on Bridge Construction, 1842
- General Theory of Bridge Construction, New York: D. Appleton & Company, 1851
- A consideration of the plans proposed for the improvement of the Ohio River, Philadelphia: T.K. and P.G. Collins, Printers, 1855
- Report of H. Haupt, Chief Engineer of the Pennsylvania Rail Road Company, Philadelphia: Crissy & Markley, Printers, 1857
- The Coal Business on the Pennsylvania Railroad, Philadelphia: T.K. and P.G. Collins, Printers, 1857
- Tunneling by Machinery, Philadelphia: H.G. Leisenring's Steam Printing House, 1867
- Military Bridges, New York: D. Van Nostrand, 1864
- Report Upon the System of the Holly Steam Combination Company Limited, of Lockport, N.Y., Union Printing and Publishing Company, 1879
- Street Railway Motors, Philadelphia: Henry Carey Baird & Co., 1893
- Reminiscences of General Herman Haupt Wright & Joys, 1901 - United States - 331 pages

== In popular culture ==
Haupt was portrayed by Walter Brooke in the TV miniseries The Blue and the Gray. He was a character in the alternate history novels Gettysburg: A Novel of the Civil War and Grant Comes East by Newt Gingrich and William R. Forstchen.
