= Katherine Hauptman =

Swedish archaeologist and museum director

Katherine Hauptman (born 1970) is a Swedish archaeologist and museum researcher. In April 2018, she was appointed director of the Swedish History Museum in Stockholm, one of Sweden's largest museums. She has a doctorate in archaeology and has previously worked as a researcher at the History Museum. In 2022 she was appointed director of the planned Swedish museum about the Holocaust.

== Biography ==
With a Ph.D. in archaeology, Hauptman has worked as a university lecturer, a project manager for research and communication at the Swedish History Museum, and project leader of JÄMUS, Sweden's governmental authority for equal representation in the museum sector. She also managed the History Museum's successful Viking exhibition "We Call Them Vikings" which has toured Europe and North America since 2012. In 2015, together with her colleague Kerstin Näversköld, she published Genusförbart: inspiration, erfarenheter och metoder för mångfald i museiarbete on the need for more attention to gender equality in museum work.

Hauptman has also headed the Swedish branch of ICOM, the International Council of Museums.
