= Lewis M. Haupt =

American civil engineer (1844–1937)

- Born: Lewis Muhlenberg Haupt; March 21, 1844; Gettysburg, Pennsylvania, U.S.
- Died: March 10, 1937 (aged 92); Bala Cynwyd, Pennsylvania, U.S.
- Resting place: West Laurel Hill Cemetery, Bala Cynwyd, Pennsylvania, U.S.
- Education: University of Pennsylvania; Lawrence Scientific School; United States Military Academy
- Occupation: Civil engineer
- Spouse: Isabella Christiana Cromwell (m. 1873)
- Children: 5
- Parents: Herman Haupt (father); Ann Cecilia Keller (mother)

Lewis Muhlenberg Haupt (March 21, 1844 – March 10, 1937) was an American civil engineer. He was a professor of civil engineering at the University of Pennsylvania from 1872 to 1892. He won the Magellanic Premium award in 1887 for his work on physical hydrography and the Elliott Cresson Medal in 1901 for his work on a reaction breakwater used to maintain channels through ocean shoals.

He served as a commissioner of the Lake Erie and Ohio River ship canal in 1892, and as a member of the Nicaragua Canal Commission in 1897, and the Isthmian Canal Commission of 1899.

== Early life and education ==
Haupt was born March 21, 1844, in Gettysburg, Pennsylvania, to railroad engineer Herman Haupt and Ann Cecilia Keller. He attended the public schools in Philadelphia and Germantown Academy. In 1858, he accompanied his father to Massachusetts during his work on the Hoosac Tunnel. Lewis attended high schools in Greenfield, Massachusetts, and Cambridge, Massachusetts, and the Lawrence Scientific School. He attended the University of Pennsylvania as a freshman for the 1861/1862 academic year. He was appointed to the United States Military Academy at West Point, New York, by President Abraham Lincoln in 1863, and graduated in 1867.

== Career ==
In 1868, he served as a lieutenant of engineers for the United States Lake Survey of Lake Superior. In 1869, he moved to Texas and served as engineer officer for the Fifth Military District working on surveys of government buildings and military roads. He also designed plans to protect Fort Brown from flooding of the Rio Grande. He resigned his commission in 1869 and accepted a role as assistant engineer and topographer for Fairmount Park in Philadelphia, Pennsylvania. In April 1872, he worked as an assistant examiner in the United States Patent Office in engineering and architecture. He joined the faculty of the University of Pennsylvania as professor of civil engineering in 1872 and worked in that role for twenty years. In 1875, he was appointed in charge of the United States Geodetic Survey for Pennsylvania.

In April 1886, Haupt patented a reaction breakwater, an adjustable deflecting shield attached to barges, buoys, or floats to maintain channels through ocean shoals. He received the Magellanic Premium award in 1887 for his work on physical hydrography and the changes in channels and shoals.

In 1892, he was appointed a commissioner of the Lake Erie and Ohio River ship canal.

In 1897, President William McKinley appointed him to the Nicaraguan Canal Commission, which studied the possibility of a canal connecting the Atlantic and Pacific Oceans. A route through Panama was finally selected, and Haupt served on the Isthmian Canal Commission of 1899 from 1899 to 1902. He was president of the Colombia-Canea Arbitration (1897), and was chief engineer of the survey for ship canals across New Jersey.

In 1901, he was awarded the Cresson gold medal from the Franklin Institute for his work on the reaction breakwater.

He was editor of the Engineering Register in 1886. He was a member of the American Association for the Advancement of Science, the American Philosophical Society, the American Society of Civil Engineers, the Geographical Society of Philadelphia, and the National Geographic Society.

He died in Bala Cynwyd, Pennsylvania, on March 10, 1937, and was interred at West Laurel Hill Cemetery.

== Personal life ==
He married Isabella Cromwell on June 26, 1873, and together they had five children.

== Publications ==
- Working Drawings and How to Make and Use Them, Philadelphia: Jos. M. Stoddard & Co., 1881
- The Topographer, His Methods and Instruments, New York: J.M. Stoddart, 1883
- The Physical Phenomena of Harbor Entrances, 1887
- Canals and Their Economic Relation to Transportation, 1890
- A Move for Better Roads, Philadelphia: University of Pennsylvania Press, 1891
- The Proposed Ship Canal Between Philadelphia and New York, New York Board of Trade and Transportation, 1892
- A Manual of Engineering Specifications and Contracts, Philadelphia: Henry Carey Baird & Co., 1900
- Pamphlets on Rivers and Harbors, 1903
- The Transportation Crisis, 1907
- The Mississippi River Problem, 1904
