= Eben C. Smeed =

American civil engineer

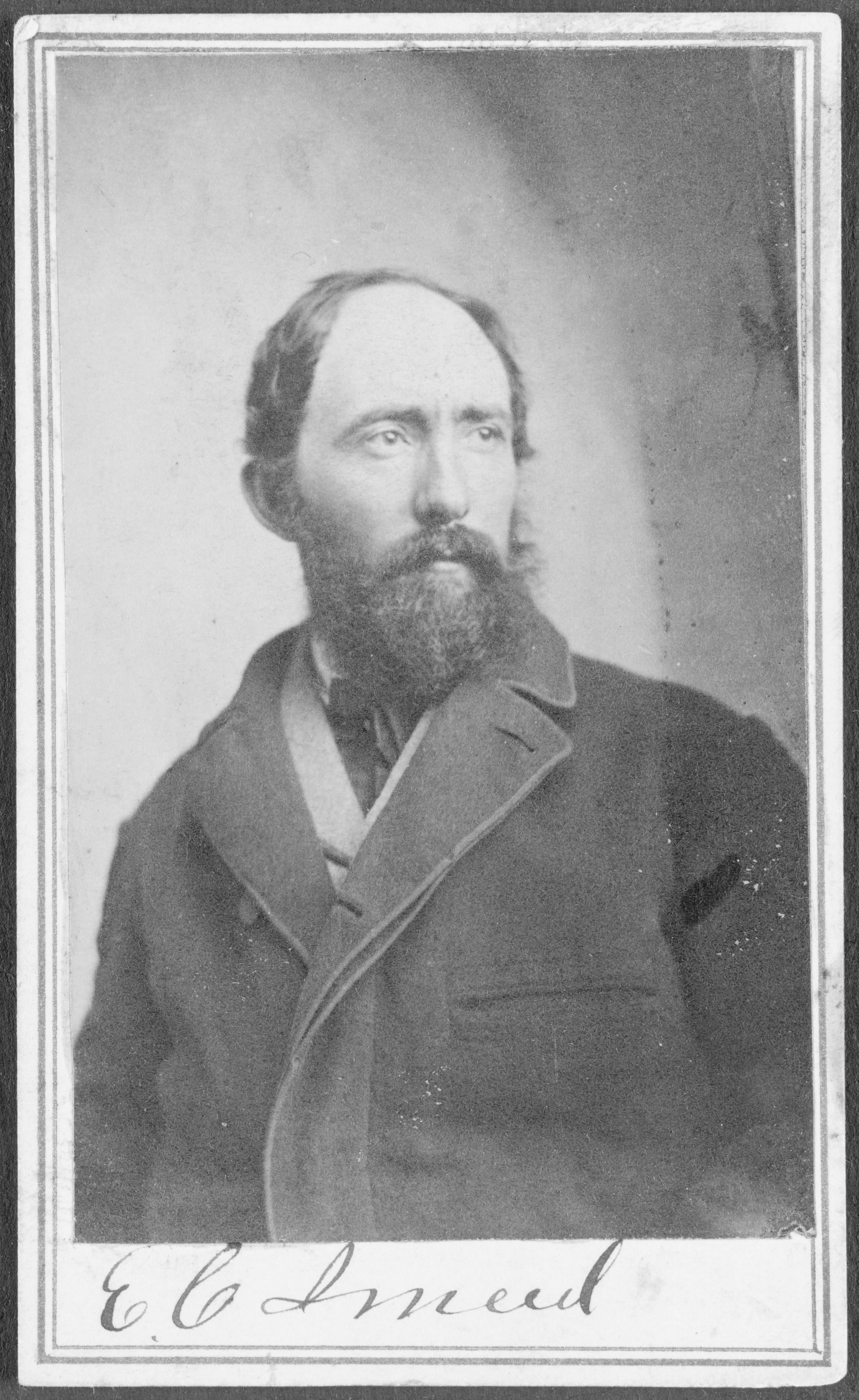
Eben Cedron Smeed

Eben Cedron Smeed (December 8, 1830 – August 24, 1892) was an American civil engineer who was best known for his work on railroads, particularly the United States Military Railroad (USMRR) in supporting Sherman's Atlanta and Savannah campaigns working first under General Herman Haupt and then Colonel William Wierman Wright. Smeed typified the successful, self-made civil engineer in the 19th century.

Haupt praised Smeed as a "man without education... [and nevertheless] a close student [and] expert mathematician" as well as the best organizer of worksites Haupt had ever seen. Smeed's work on building the Chattahoochee bridge was in Haupt's opinion, unmatched anywhere in the world or military history.

== Early life and career ==
Smeed was born into a pioneer family of six in Nicholson Township, Wyoming County, Pennsylvania on December 8, 1830. Smeed married Mary Smeed and had a daughter, Kate Smeed Cross. With his brother Mathias, Smeed started as a rodman in 1851 on the Catawissa Railroad in Columbia County, Pennsylvania. Smeed became Road Supervisor, in charge of bridges and trestles.

In 1852, Smeed was one of three engineers who designed the old Portage bridge on the Erie Railroad. He also worked on building several large stone arches still standing on the Delaware, Lackawanna and Western Railroad near Scranton, Pennsylvania. In 1853, he worked on the Lackawanna and Bloomsburg Railroad becoming its superintendent.

== Civil war ==
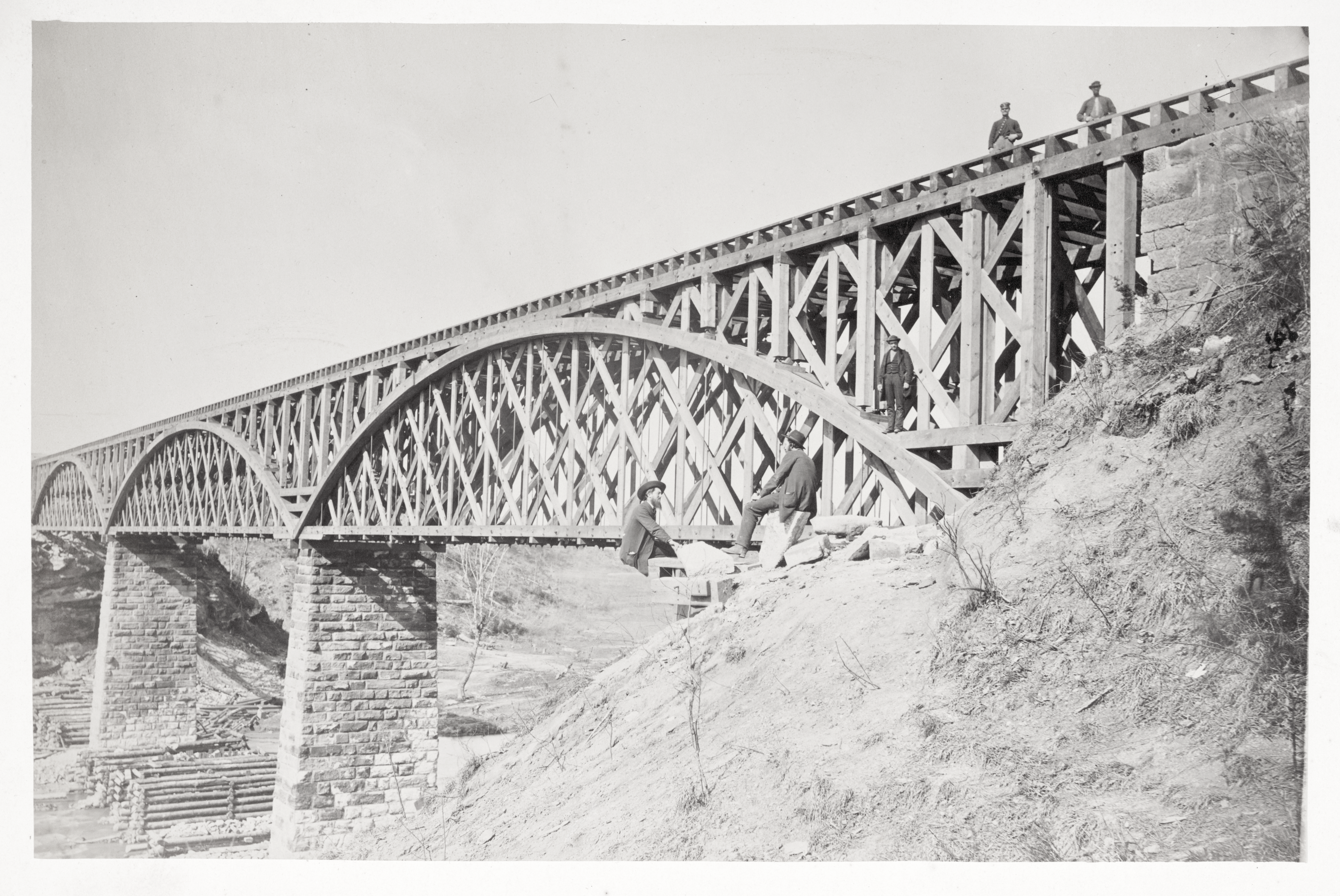
1862 US Military Railroads rebuilding the high bridge across Potomac Creek using Haupt's new design, Adna Anderson seated center-left and Eben C. Smeed seated right.

In 1862, Smeed came to Virginia in the employ of Daniel Stone as a foreman of carpenters. Smeed was superintendent for the pontoon bridge crossing of the Rappahannock on the occasion of General Burnside's ill-fated attack on Fredericksburg.

In November 1862, Smeed was with Colonel William Wright who was assigned by Haupt as Chief Engineer and Superintendent of Richmond, Fredericksburg, and Potomac Railroad to rebuild the wharves at Acquia creek as well as fifteen miles of the railroad to Fredericksburg, Virginia controlled by the Union army with Adna Anderson acted as chief engineer of construction. After rebuilding the bridges and wharves for the road, Wright was forced to abandon Acquia creek on September 6, 1862, due to Lee's victory at the Second Battle of Bull Run. Wright returned to Acquia creek in November 1862 while Lee had destroyed the railroad line from its terminus at Acquia creek all the way to Fredericksburg. Working under Wright, Smeed rebuilt the road including the Potomac creek high bridge but was forced to again abandon the railroad in June 1863 when Lee's advance to Gettysburg forced Union forces to retreat from their Fredericksburg positions.

As Haupt noted in his memoirs, in this 1863 retreat, Smeed remained at his station long after they had been evacuated by the military in retreat. In this case, Smeed led a small force of carpenters, worked for nearly half a day under fire, until their ropes were cut, the pulleys smashed, and the timbers knocked about with shells. A military force of 200 men, which had been detailed to assist, straggled off soon after the action commenced, not leaving a single man to protect Smeed's crew.

For a detailed discussion on Smeed's role in Sherman's Atlanta campaign, see this article.

=== Destruction of Confederate railroads ===
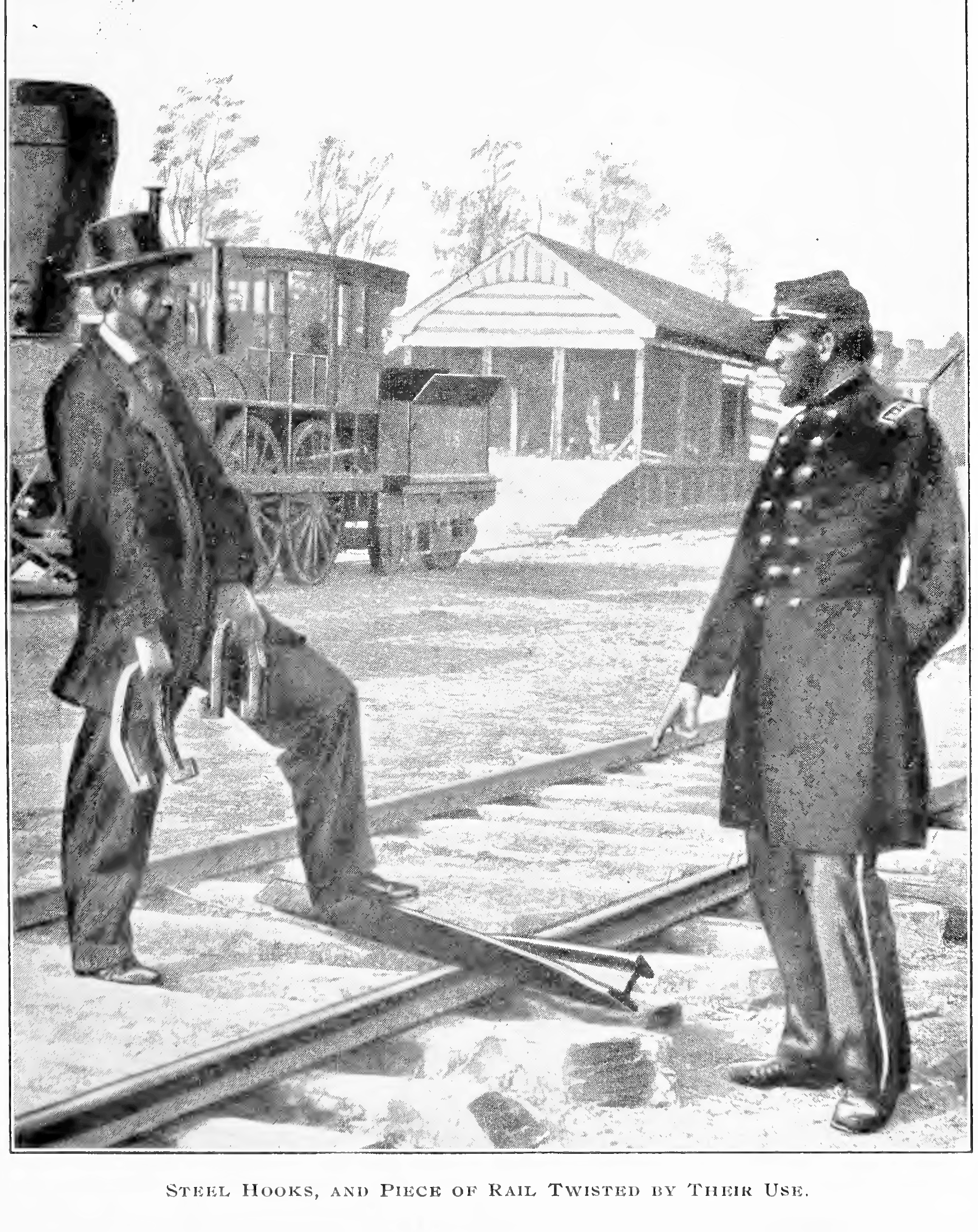
Rail hooks developed by Smeed for destroying iron rails

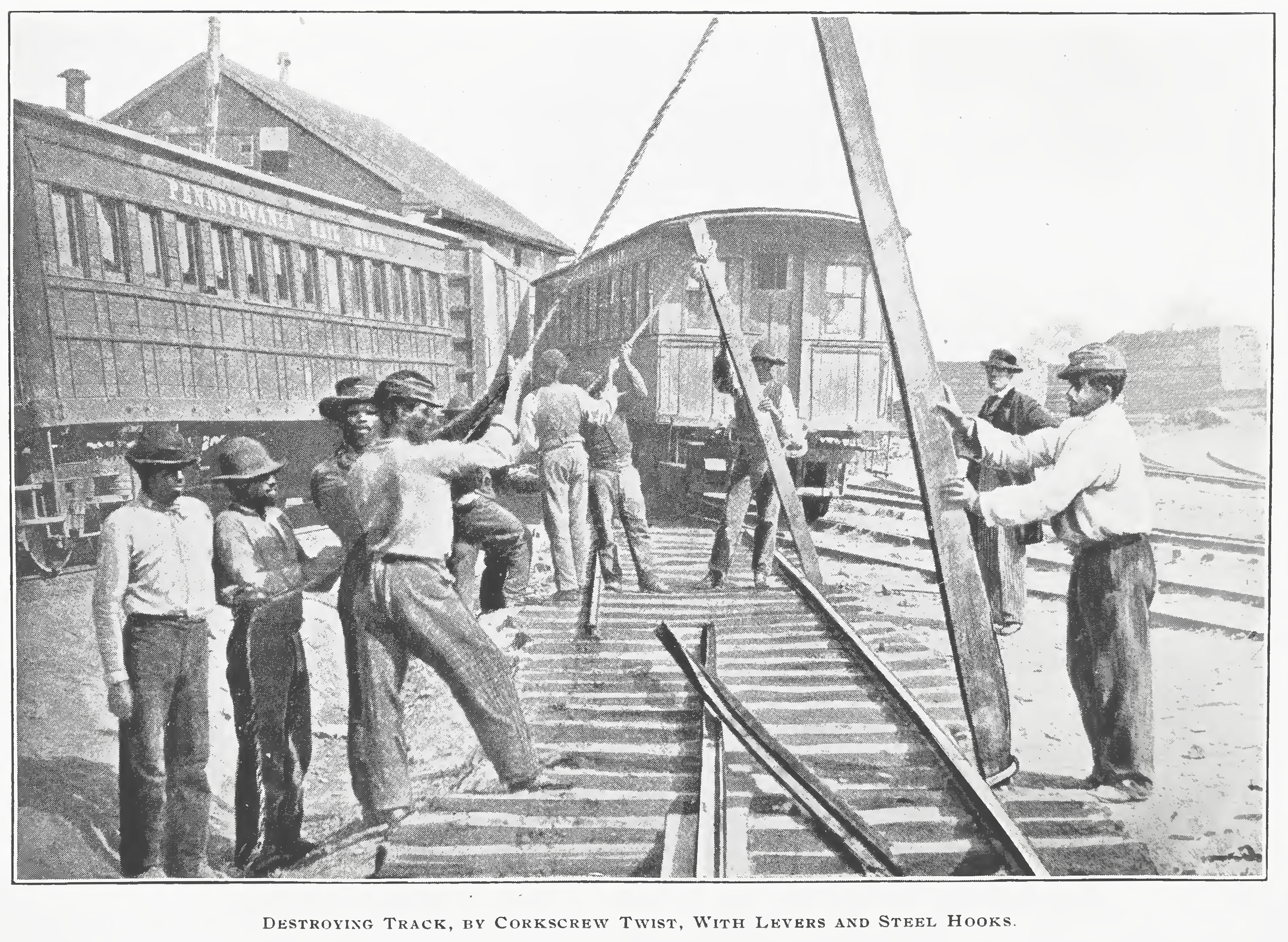
Rails being ripped up using one of two hook types in use during Sherman's Atlanta and Savannah campaigns.

Haupt considered it to be part of the Construction corps mission to "break the communications of the enemy...". Sherman in his Atlanta and Savannah campaigns had always been "obsessed with the efficient wrecking of railroads, and never ceased to emphasize to his subordinates the importance of twisting the rails so that they would have to be re-rolled." Ordinary methods such as those used in constructing the track in the first instant were not portable or were too heavy to carry on raiding parties. The problem Haupt confronted was that "(e)ven when track is torn up, if the cross-ties are not burned and the rails destroyed, the time required to repair is less than is necessary to inflict the damage." It required rendering the rails unusable. Rails that are simply bent can easily be reworked in usable shape with relatively little effort. Haupt discovered that the answer was to twist the rail in a corkscrew fashion. Any rail worked in such a manner could not be fixed in the field but required shipment back to a rolling mill to be reheated and reshaped. Smeed invented a simple contrivance called a "cant hook". With a pair, rails could easily be twisted as well as breaking the track fasteners, or "chairs". Smeed's cant hooks were used in the

destruction of the railroads at Atlanta and were carried on the subsequent campaigns; but (Smeed's) cant hooks appear to have been most prevalent, because they were easier to transport, and two hooks at each end of a rail could twist it the same as a wrench. The hooks were made and carried by the Michigan and Missouri engineers and by the cavalry.

== Post bellum career ==
Smeed became chief engineer of the Union Pacific Railroad in 1890.

== Death and interment ==
On August 24, 1892, Smeed died in Philadelphia, Pennsylvania from kidney disease and was interred on August 28 at Emporia, Kansas.

== Legacy and impact ==
Haupt praised Smeed as the driving force behind McCallum and Wright's success with the Construction corps in both Virginia and Atlanta campaigns. For Smeed. as Haupt observed, "the trumpet of fame" never published his exploits of that period. Smeed's work on building the Chattahoochee bridge was in Haupt's opinion, unmatched anywhere in the world or military history.

Without Smeed, Sherman's military railroads could not have been reconstructed with the celerity with which the work was accomplished. Without the roads, there could have been no transportation of supplies; without supplies, the army could not have moved in the enemy's country and the campaign would have been a failure. Let Smeed have the credit that is due to him.
