= Adna Anderson =

American railroad engineer

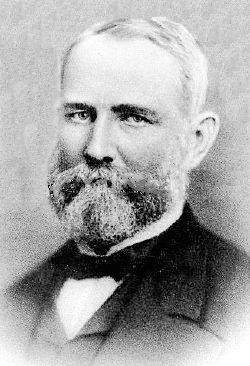
Adna Anderson (1827-1889)

General Adna Anderson (July 25, 1827 – May 15, 1889) was chief engineer of the Northern Pacific Railroad from 1880 to 1888. He first worked in railways in 1847, and worked his way up through various railways, leading to being an assistant engineer for the Army of the Potomac during the Civil War. Near the end of the war, he was placed in charge of all government railways. He returned to private industry in 1867, eventually leading to employment with Northern Pacific Railroad in 1881. There, he led construction of railways connecting St. Paul with both Portland and Seattle. He was vice president of the company from 1886 until leaving in 1888. After leaving Northern Pacific, he worked in an office in New York City for another year, where he shot himself on May 14, 1889. He died the next day.

== Early career ==
Anderson was born in Ridgeway, New York on July 25, 1827. Anderson began his railway career in 1847, as chainman on the New York and New Haven Railroad. From October 1847 to November 1848, he was assistant engineer of the Connecticut River Railroad; from November 1848 to September 1848 assistant engineer on the Mobile and Ohio; from that date to March 1850 assistant engineer on the Ashuelot Railroad in New Hampshire. Afterward he was successively resident engineer of the Michigan Southern and Northern Indiana; locating engineer of the Mobile and Ohio; chief engineer on the Tennessee and Alabama; chief engineer and superintendent of the Edgefield and Kentucky; and for a short time chief engineer of the Henderson and Nashville. When the Edgefield and Kentucky failed, General Anderson was appointed receiver.

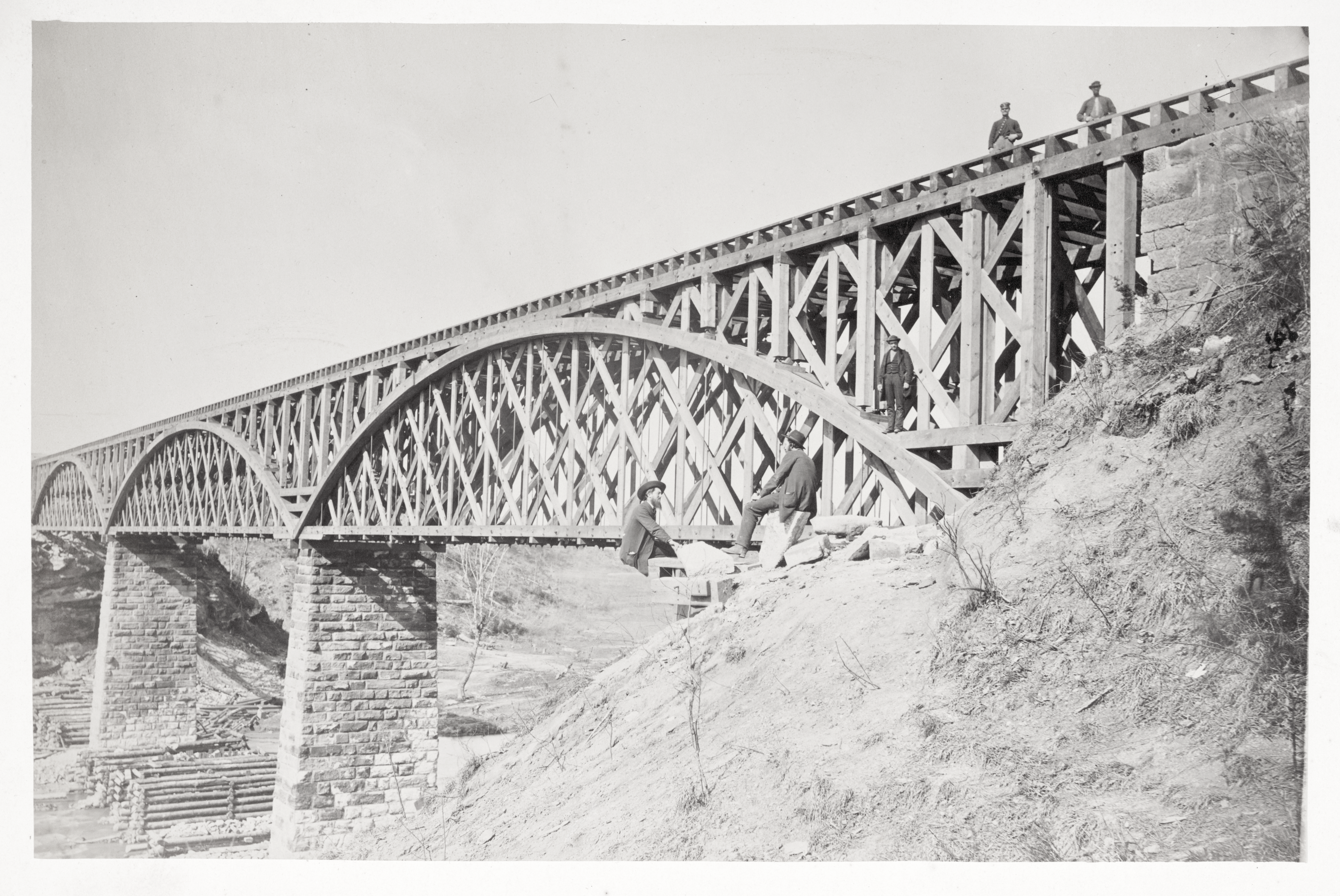
1862 US Military Railroads rebuilding the high bridge across Potomac Creek using Haupt's new design, Adna Anderson seated center-left and Eben C. Smeed seated right.

When the American Civil War broke out General Anderson offered his services to the United States government, and was made assistant engineer and chief of the Construction Corps of the Army of the Potomac in Virginia. In the following year he was made general superintendent of Government Railroads of the Military Division of the Mississippi. From November 1864 to July 1866 he was chief superintendent and engineer of all the military railroads.

From February to May 1867, he was chief engineer of the Illinois and St. Louis Bridge; afterwards general superintendent of the Kansas Pacific Railway; then vice-president and general manager of the Toledo, Wabash and Western. General Anderson was made president of the LaFayette, Muncie and Bloomington Railroad in 1873; he was appointed receiver of the Chicago, Danville and Vincennes in May 1875; in February 1880 he was made chief engineer of the Northern Pacific Railroad.

== Northern Pacific career ==
In the latter part of 1881 General Anderson took a long and fatiguing journey over the proposed line of the Northern Pacific, making a personal inspection of the proposed route across the backbone of the continent and through what was then the western wilds.

From the observations made on this long journey from Bismarck, North Dakota to Portland, Oregon, General Anderson became satisfied that the general route laid down by the late William Milnor Roberts (a former president of the American Society of Civil Engineers), as the line of the Northern Pacific, was in the main correct, at least so far as the line between the Missouri River and Columbia River was concerned, and on this line, substantially, he went on and completed the road, witnessing the driving of the last spike September 8, 1883.

The main line having been completed from St. Paul to Wallula where junction was formed with the Oregon Railway and Navigation Company’s line, thus making a through line to Portland, the company turned its attention to its Cascade Division, intended to connect its line at some point near the mouth of the Snake River, with Tacoma on Puget Sound. Surveys for this division had been in progress much of the time since March, 1880, and much had been done even previous to that date, at intervals, in the way of reconnaissance and preliminary work. The company desired to build on the best attainable line, but to find this line, with conditions then existing, was a work of great difficulty, requiring time, labor and expense. General Anderson took great interest in all this work, but did not express any final judgment until the autumn of 1883, after all the information was available, when he reported that the line ought to be built through Stampede Pass, believing it to be the route that could be operated at least expense and that it would best protect the company from the encroachments of rival enterprises, which judgment has been fully confirmed by the events of the past two years.

In October, 1886, General Anderson was elected second vice-president of the Northern Pacific, which position, together with that of chief engineer of this road, he held up to January, 1888.

== Personal life and death ==
General Anderson married, in 1856, Juliet C. Van Wyck, with whom he had six children. The eldest daughter, Sallie, married United States Navy Lieutenant John C. Fremont, Jr., a son of General John C. Fremont; the oldest son, Philip Van Wyck Anderson, was a civil engineer on the Northern Pacific Railroad.

In May 1889 General Anderson opened an office in New York, at 155 Broadway, where he was engaged in organizing the Gordon Fire Alarm Company and the Steel Car Company. About a year before his death he contracted what is known as mountain fever while on one of his western trips, from which he never entirely recovered.

On the night of May 14, 1889, Anderson shot himself with a revolver in his room at the Lafayette Hotel in Philadelphia, Pennsylvania. Anderson had checked into the hotel two days earlier, his only baggage being a gripsack, or small suitcase.

According to Virgil Gay Bogue, in his 2009 book, Proceedings of the American Society of Civil Engineers, General Anderson was a quiet and somewhat taciturn man, of great integrity and clear, impartial judgment.
