= National Register of Historic Places listings in Albany County, Wyoming =

Location of Albany County in Wyoming

This is a list of the National Register of Historic Places listings in Albany County, Wyoming. It is intended to be a complete list of the properties and districts on the National Register of Historic Places in Albany County, Wyoming, United States. The locations of National Register properties and districts for which the latitude and longitude coordinates are included below, may be seen in a map.

There are 43 properties and districts listed on the National Register in the county, of which one is also a National Historic Landmark.

This National Park Service list is complete through NPS recent listings posted August 21, 2026.

Contents: Counties in Wyoming
Albany - Big Horn - Campbell - Carbon - Converse - Crook - Fremont - Goshen - Hot Springs - Johnson - Laramie - Lincoln - Natrona - Niobrara - Park - Platte - Sheridan - Sublette - Sweetwater - Teton - Uinta - Washakie - Weston

== Current listings ==
	Name on the Register	Image	Date listed	Location	City or town	Description
1	Ames Monument	Ames Monument	July 24, 1972 (#72001296)	3 miles northwest of Sherman; 41°07′53″N 105°23′51″W	Sherman	Designated a National Historic Landmark in 2016.
2	Barn at Oxford Horse Ranch	Barn at Oxford Horse Ranch	June 25, 1986 (#86001398)	868 U.S. Route 287; 41°11′18″N 105°35′32″W	Laramie	
3	Bath Ranch	Bath Ranch	December 13, 1985 (#85003211)	Herrick Lane Rd. 41°24′16″N 105°49′33″W	Laramie	
4	Bath Row	Bath Row	May 8, 1986 (#86001015)	155, 157, and 159 N. 6th St. and 611 University Ave. 41°18′46″N 105°35′19″W	Laramie	
5	Charles E. Blair House	Charles E. Blair House	October 31, 1980 (#80004298)	170 N. 5th St. 41°18′49″N 105°35′26″W	Laramie	
6	N.K. Boswell Ranch	N.K. Boswell Ranch	July 21, 1977 (#77001381)	South of Woods Landing off Wyoming Highway 230; 41°00′08″N 106°00′52″W	Woods Landing	
7	Brooklyn Lodge	Brooklyn Lodge	October 24, 1989 (#89001068)	Wyoming Highway 130, 7.5 miles west of Centennial; 41°21′21″N 106°13′57″W	Centennial	
8	Centennial Depot	Centennial Depot	November 8, 1982 (#82001828)	Wyoming Highway 130; 41°17′49″N 106°08′13″W	Centennial	Now the Nici Self Historical Museum.
9	Centennial Work Center	Centennial Work Center	April 11, 1994 (#94000273)	Off Wyoming Highway 130 northwest of Centennial, Medicine Bow National Forest; 41°18′28″N 106°09′25″W	Centennial	
10	Como Bluff	Como Bluff	January 18, 1973 (#73001925)	On U.S. Route 30, along Como Ridge; 41°53′13″N 106°03′24″W	Rock River	Extends into Carbon County
11	John D. Conley House	John D. Conley House	May 15, 1980 (#80004299)	718 Ivinson St. 41°18′41″N 105°35′14″W	Laramie	
12	Cooper Mansion	Cooper Mansion	August 8, 1983 (#83003359)	1411 Grand Ave. 41°18′38″N 105°34′38″W	Laramie	Referred to as Cooper House by its owner, the University of Wyoming, it houses the University's American Studies Program.
13	Dale Creek Crossing (48AB145)	Dale Creek Crossing (48AB145)	May 9, 1986 (#86001027)	4 miles west of Sherman; 41°06′15″N 105°27′17″W	Ames Monument	
14	DOE Bridge over Laramie River	DOE Bridge over Laramie River	February 22, 1985 (#85000411)	County Road CNA-740; 41°35′32″N 105°39′23″W	Bosler	Replaced in 1993
15	Durlacher House	Durlacher House	March 21, 2011 (#11000097)	501 S. 5th St. 41°18′32″N 105°35′28″W	Laramie	
16	East Side School	East Side School	March 17, 1981 (#81000610)	Off U.S. Route 30; 41°18′33″N 105°35′14″W	Laramie	Located at 710 East Garfield Street.
17	First National Bank of Rock River	First National Bank of Rock River	November 21, 1988 (#88002532)	131 Ave. C 41°44′37″N 105°58′43″W	Rock River	
18	Flying Horseshoe Ranch		October 12, 2000 (#00001226)	156 Dinwiddie Rd. 41°16′13″N 106°06′53″W	Centennial	
19	Fort Sanders Guardhouse	Fort Sanders Guardhouse	May 1, 1980 (#80004300)	Kiowa St. 41°16′27″N 105°35′56″W	Laramie	
20	William Goodale House	William Goodale House	August 5, 1991 (#91000996)	214 S. 14th St. 41°18′37″N 105°34′48″W	Laramie	
21	Hart Ranch		August 24, 2026 (#100012914)	166 Hart Road; 41°14′20″N 105°41′48″W	Laramie	
22	Ivinson Mansion and Grounds	Ivinson Mansion and Grounds	February 23, 1972 (#72001295)	603 Ivinson Ave. 41°18′44″N 105°35′18″W	Laramie	
23	Jelm-Frank Smith Ranch Historic District		August 31, 1978 (#78002816)	South of Woods Landing; 41°03′33″N 106°00′41″W	Woods Landing	
24	Keystone Work Center		April 11, 1994 (#94000275)	West of Albany, Medicine Bow National Forest; 41°10′09″N 106°14′55″W	Albany	
25	F.S. King Brothers Ranch Historic District	F.S. King Brothers Ranch Historic District	September 21, 2006 (#06000874)	Address restricted	Laramie	
26	Laramie Downtown Historic District	Laramie Downtown Historic District	November 10, 1988 (#88002541)	Roughly bounded by University Ave., 6th St., Grand Ave., 3rd St., Garfield Ave., and 1st Ave. 41°18′35″N 105°35′38″W	Laramie	
27	Laramie West Side Historic District	Laramie West Side Historic District	August 4, 2025 (#100012058)	West of downtown Laramie and the Union Pacific Railroad tracks and east of the Laramie River; 41°18′35″N 105°36′04″W	Laramie	
28	Lehman-Tunnell Mansion	Lehman-Tunnell Mansion	November 8, 1982 (#82001829)	618 Grand Ave. 41°18′38″N 105°35′18″W	Laramie	
29	Libby Lodge	Libby Lodge	September 30, 1976 (#76001947)	Northwest of Centennial on Wyoming Highway 130; 41°19′20″N 106°10′19″W	Centennial	
30	Lincoln School	Lincoln School	December 5, 2003 (#03001252)	209 S. Cedar St. 41°18′43″N 105°35′58″W	Laramie	
31	Abraham Lincoln Monument	Abraham Lincoln Monument	July 16, 2026 (#100013241)	Sherman Summit Rest Area (Interstate 80), 143 Forest Road 705; 41°14′13″N 105°26′11″W	Laramie vicinity	
32	Mountain View Hotel	Mountain View Hotel	June 7, 2007 (#07000541)	2747 Wyoming Highway 130; 41°17′52″N 106°08′24″W	Centennial	
33	North Albany Clubhouse	North Albany Clubhouse	July 23, 1998 (#98000908)	Address restricted 41°57′40″N 105°33′59″W	Garrett	Provided coordinates show a small building at the intersection of Garrett and Tunnel Roads
34	Old Main	Old Main	July 11, 1986 (#86001536)	University of Wyoming campus, 9th St. and Ivinson Ave. 41°18′43″N 105°35′02″W	Laramie	
35	Parker Ranch House	Parker Ranch House	December 13, 1985 (#85003209)	Address restricted	Laramie Peak	
36	Richardson's Overland Trail Ranch	Richardson's Overland Trail Ranch	March 5, 1992 (#92000122)	111 Hart Rd. 41°14′29″N 105°42′06″W	Laramie	
37	St. Matthew's Cathedral Close	St. Matthew's Cathedral Close	April 12, 1984 (#84003622)	104 S. 4th St. 41°18′45″N 105°35′33″W	Laramie	
38	St. Paulus Kirche	St. Paulus Kirche	November 25, 1983 (#83004266)	602 Garfield; 41°18′35″N 105°35′20″W	Laramie	Now known as St. Paul's United Church of Christ of Laramie
39	Snow Train Rolling Stock	Snow Train Rolling Stock	May 8, 2013 (#13000265)	S. 1st & E. Sheridan Sts. 41°18′27″N 105°35′47″W	Laramie	
40	Union Pacific Athletic Club	Union Pacific Athletic Club	September 13, 1978 (#78002814)	Off U.S. Route 30; 41°19′16″N 105°32′49″W	Laramie	Now the Quadra Dangle Square Dance Club. The address is 3905 East Grays Gable Road
41	University Neighborhood Historic District	University Neighborhood Historic District	December 18, 2009 (#09001109)	Roughly bounded by 6th St., 15th St., University Ave., and Custer St. 41°18′37″N 105°34′59″W	Laramie	
42	Vee Bar Ranch Lodge	Vee Bar Ranch Lodge	June 30, 1986 (#86001468)	2087 Wyoming Highway 130; 41°17′49″N 106°00′42″W	Laramie	
43	Woods Landing Dance Hall	Woods Landing Dance Hall	December 13, 1985 (#85003210)	2731 Wyoming Highway 230; 41°06′37″N 106°00′44″W	Woods Landing	
44	Wyoming Territorial Penitentiary	Wyoming Territorial Penitentiary	March 29, 1978 (#78002815)	Off Wyoming Highway 130; 41°18′45″N 105°36′32″W	Laramie	

== See also ==
- List of National Historic Landmarks in Wyoming
- National Register of Historic Places listings in Wyoming
