= Wyoming Marathon =

- Date: late May
- Location: Medicine Bow National Forest, Wyoming, United States
- Event type: dirt and gravel roads
- Distance: Ultramarathon, marathon, and half marathon
- Established: 1978
- Website: Wyoming Marathon Races

The Wyoming Marathon Races are a series of running races held annually in Medicine Bow National Forest between Laramie and Cheyenne, Wyoming.

== Events ==
- Vedauwoo 5K
- Medicine Bow Half Marathon
- Wyoming Marathon
- Rock Mountain 50k
- Rocky Mountain Double Marathon

The course for the half marathon, marathon, and 50k all start at the Lincoln Monument Rest Area off I-80. The course is an out-and-back through the roads of Medicine Bow National Forest, starting at an elevation of 8,700 ft. and dropping to 8,000 ft. at the lowest point of the marathon and 50k course.

The Wyoming Marathon is the oldest marathon in the state and the Rocky Mountain Double Marathon was the oldest ultramarathon in the Rocky Mountain region. It is one of only three marathons in the state of Wyoming, in addition to the Casper Marathon and the Run with the Horses Marathon in Green River.

== Rocky Mountain Double Marathon Winners ==
Year	Athlete	Country/State	Time	Notes	Athlete	Country/State	Time	Notes
2019	Sam Pfanstiel	Wyoming	6:21:14		Leah Ritz	Wyoming	6:20:18	
2008	Bryan Goding	Colorado	7:42:49		Jamie Donaldson	Colorado	8:17:24	

== Rocky Mountain 50k Winners ==
Year	Athlete	Country/State	Time	Notes	Athlete	Country/State	Time	Notes
2025	Cory Logsdon		4:04:00		Silvia Sanches-Martinez		6:17:54	
2024	Mark Gaudet		4:27:54		Anita Marie Fromm		8:19:37	
2023	Chris Hall		4:54:26		Liz Sethner		5:53:49	
2021	Sean Meissner	Colorado	4:30:54		Karla Wagner		6:09:59	
2018	Shane Vetter		4:30:15		Carrie Taylor		5:49:32	
2017	Andy Ommen		4:27:24		Leah White		6:19:09	
2016	Stephen Castle	Colorado	4:33:39		Kelly Wiederholt	Colorado	6:23:22	
2015	Nick Scalfone	California	3:47:24		Karen Kantor	Colorado	4:46:51	

== Wyoming Marathon Winners ==
Year	Athlete	Country/State	Time	Notes	Athlete	Country/State	Time	Notes
2025	Stefan Joseph Dekleva		4:26:14		Avery Fischer		4:41:05	
2024	Christopher Brayton		3:57:56		Megan Gibney		5:02:37	
2023	Kevin Sweeney		4:09:25		Patricia Shaffer		4:19:03	
2022	Alonso Martinez		3:28:00		Michelle Ladonne		4:57:40	
2021	Alonso Martinez		3:33:06		Samantha Brant		5:05:53	
2019	Andrew Hackman	District of Columbia	3:40:55		Anna Weisbrodt	Colorado	3:57:45	
2018	Nicholas Good		4:04:16		Elena Polush		5:41:46	
2017	Matt Van Derra		4:04:20		Haley Adroski		3:56:50	
2016	Dave Yanchek	Wyoming	3:43:15		Cady Favazzo	Wyoming	4:53:07	
2015	Adam Utroske	Colorado	3:43:51		Jennifer Malmberg	Colorado	4:21:36	
2014	James Sullivan	Massachusetts	3:17:24		Belinda Young	Georgia	4:56:38	
2013	Brad Berger	Colorado	3:24:32		Shannon Lindgren	Minnesota	4:22:39	
2012	Nicholas Davis	Colorado	3:06:46		Jennifer Malmberg	Colorado	3:59:05	
2011	Robert Preston	Tennessee	3:05:55		Jenn Malmberg	Colorado	3:52:08	
2010	Sam Malmberg	Colorado	3:26:05		Gayle Zorrilla	Colorado	3:43:52	
2009	Nick Clark	Colorado	3:12:33		Amy Kubal	South Dakota	3:58:44	
2008	Dan Goding	Colorado	3:17:15		Stacey McAnelly	Minnesota	4:08:10	
2007	Corey Hanson	Colorado	3:18:26		Tania Pacev	Colorado	3:55:02	
2006	Justin Walker	Colorado	3:26:23		Tania Pacev	Colorado	3:47:23	
2005	Michael Robbert	Colorado	3:30:02		Tania Pacev	Colorado	3:37:02	
2004	Eric Bender	Colorado	3:36:58		Nadia White	Wyoming	4:12:00	
2003	Thomas Popp		3:38:44		Judy Santagata		4:28:27	
2002	Matt Bauer		3:26:14		Tonia Ellsworth		4:25:59	
2001	Dave Mackey	Colorado	3:02:18		Laila Hughes	Utah	3:51:32	
2000	Wes Broeder	Colorado	3:28:25		Megan Klish	Colorado	4:03:57	
