= St. Paulus Kirche =

St. Paulus Kirche may refer to:

- St. Paulus Kirche, Cincinnati, a German Evangelical Protestant church in Ohio
- St. Paulus Kirche, built as a German Evangelical Lutheran church and now St. Paul's United Church of Christ of Laramie, Wyoming
