= Lincoln School (Laramie, Wyoming) =

- U.S. National Register of Historic Places
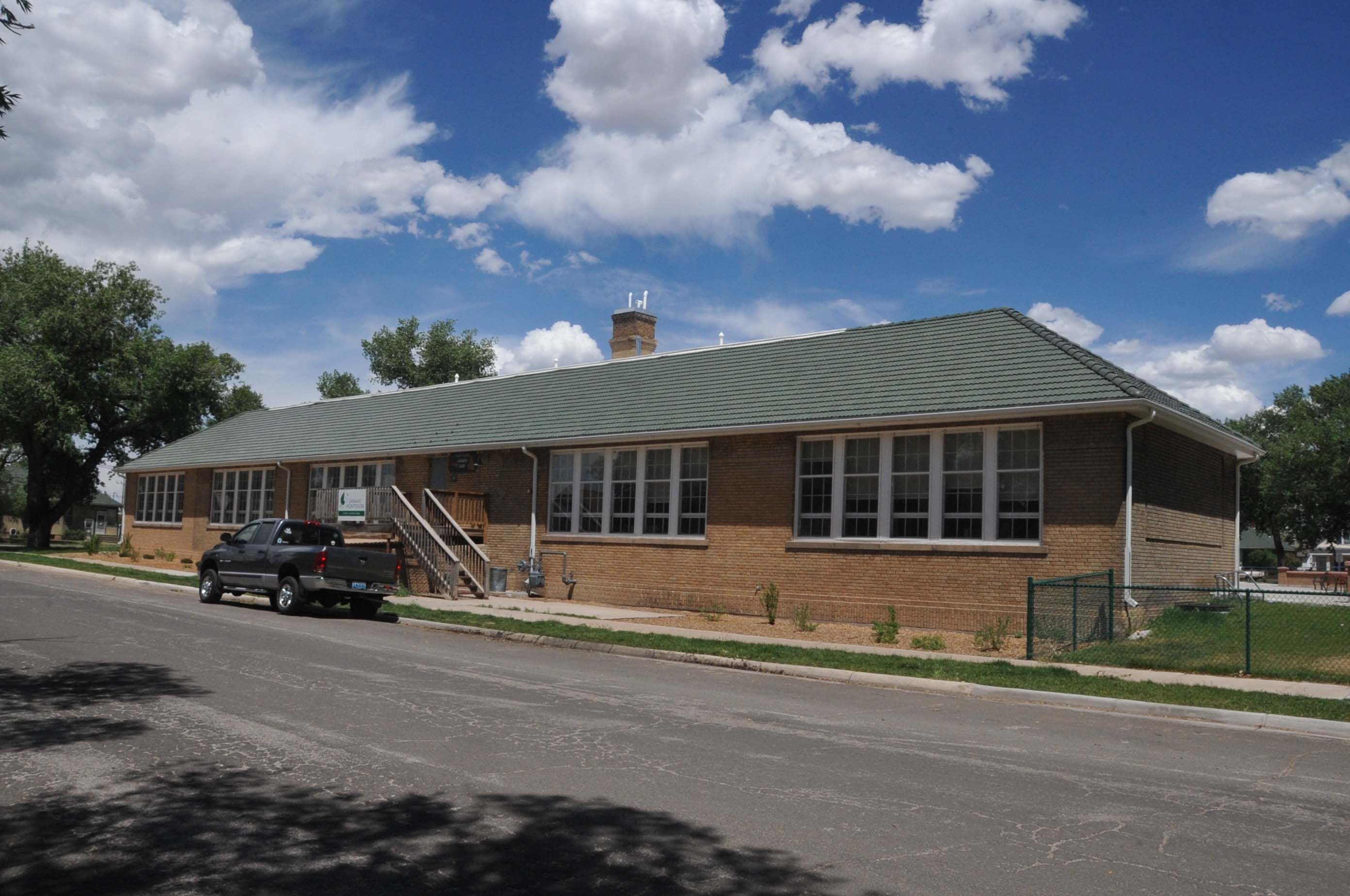
- Lincoln Community Center in 2013

- Location within Wyoming Location within the United States
- Location: 209 S. Cedar St., Laramie, Wyoming
- Coordinates: 41°18′43″N 105°35′58″W
- Area: 1.6 acres (0.65 ha)
- Built: 1924, expanded 1936 & 1958
- Architect: Wilbur A. Hitchcock (1924); William R. Dubois, F.W. "Fred" Ambrose (1936)
- NRHP reference No.: 03001252
- Added to NRHP: December 5, 2003

The Lincoln School in Laramie, Wyoming was built in 1924 and expanded in 1939 and 1958. Originally called the West Side School, served the less prosperous, largely Hispanic neighborhoods on the west side of Laramie. It was closed in 1978 and became the Lincoln Community Center. It was renovated and expanded in 2012.

Property was obtained to build a school in 1884 from the Union Pacific Railroad on what was then considered "the wrong side of the tracks." Compared with the earlier East Side School on the good side of town, the West Side School was smaller and plainer. It was a one-story structure with wood siding. In 1924 shortages of classroom space required a new building, designed by architect Wilbur A. Hitchcock. Replacing the 1884 building, it was a one-story brick structure with a green clay tile hipped roof. At its dedication it was renamed the Lincoln School.

In 1936 Public Works Administration (PWA) funding became available for school expansion. William Dubois of Cheyenne was hired as architect for the addition, assisted by F.W. "Fred" Ambrose, who had worked for Hitchcock. Work was completed in 1939, with two new classrooms, a gymnasium, cafeteria and a small performance area. The addition's style followed the original. A further addition, designed by the sons of Wilbur Hitchcock, W. Eliot and Clinton, added more classrooms.

The Lincoln School was placed on the National Register of Historic Places on December 5, 2003. Following its 2012 renovation it continues to operate as a community center.
