= Bath Row =

- U.S. National Register of Historic Places
- U.S. Historic district
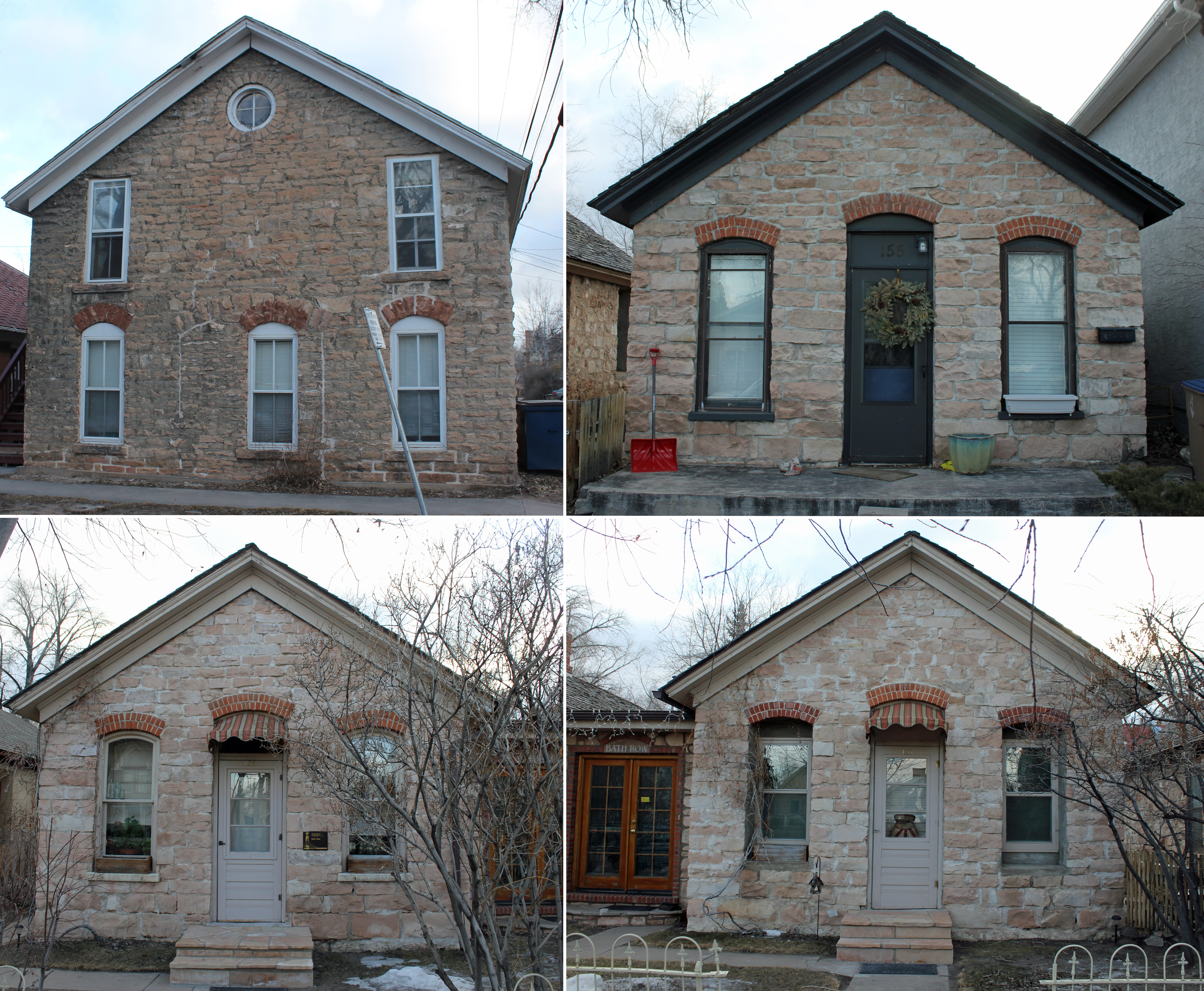
- Bath Row houses in 2014

- Location within Wyoming
- Location: 155, 157, and 159 N. Sixth St. and 611 University Ave., Laramie, Wyoming
- Coordinates: 41°18′47″N 105°35′21.1″W
- Area: less than one acre
- Built: 1883
- Built by: Theodore Bath
- NRHP reference No.: 86001015
- Added to NRHP: May 8, 1986

Bath Row, also known as the Theodore Bath Historic District, are four buildings in Laramie, Wyoming, built in 1883 by Theodore Bath and his brothers. The houses were built to be rented to employees of the Union Pacific Railroad. As brother Henry had previously done at the Bath Ranch, Bath Row was built of local limestone with red brick window arches. Three of the houses are single-story shotgun-style houses with a central doorway flanked by narrow windows, extending back from the street. The fourth building is a two-story structure with three windows on the ground floor facing the street, two above, and a round window into the attic. The side windows in all of the buildings align from one building to the next.

Bath Row was placed on the National Register of Historic Places on May 8, 1986.
