= University Neighborhood Historic District (Laramie, Wyoming) =

- U.S. National Register of Historic Places
- U.S. Historic district
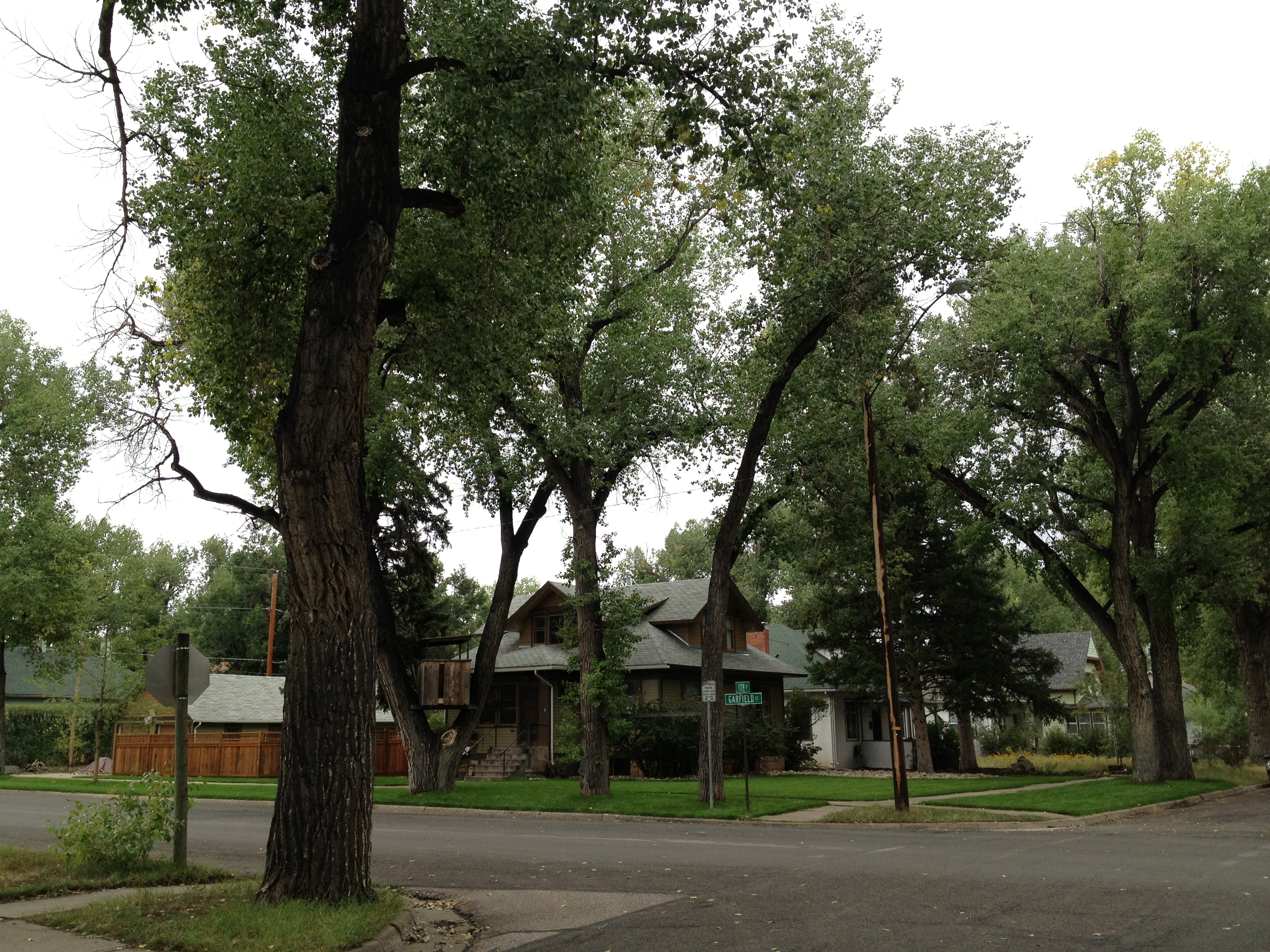
- 11th and Garfield in 2013

- Location within Wyoming Location within the United States
- Location: Roughly bounded by 6th St., 15th St., University Ave. and Custer St., Laramie, Wyoming
- Coordinates: 41°18′32″N 105°34′53″W
- Area: less than one acre
- Built: 1886
- Built by: Gagnon & Co.
- Architect: Wilbur A. Hitchcock
- Architectural style: Bungalow/American Craftsman, Tudor Revival, Colonial Revival
- NRHP reference No.: 09001109
- Added to NRHP: December 18, 2009

The University Neighborhood Historic District comprises the residential area south of the University of Wyoming in Laramie, Wyoming. The 24-block historic district is bounded on the north by University Avenue, the east by 15th Street, the south by Custer Street, and the west by 6th Street. The neighborhood's period of significance is from 1872 to 1958, a time when the area around the university was developed. Architectural styles in the district are diverse and the neighborhood is almost entirely composed of single-family residences.

At least 25 houses were designed by Laramie architect Wilbur A. Hitchcock in diverse styles. Hitchcock was a major contributor to the campus itself. Many of the houses have matching detached garages. Special emphasis was placed on landscaping and the planting of trees, giving the neighborhood the local title of the "Tree Area." During the early 20th century the neighborhood provided accommodation in apartments for university students until dormitories were built. By the mid-20th century house styles moved away from Craftsman, Tudor Revival and Queen Anne style houses and examples of streamline moderne, mission revival and international style houses appeared. In 1950 the United Presbyterian Church built a Usonian style church, influenced by the designs of Frank Lloyd Wright.

The neighborhood was placed on the National Register of Historic Places in, 2009.
