= Snow Train Rolling Stock =

- U.S. National Register of Historic Places
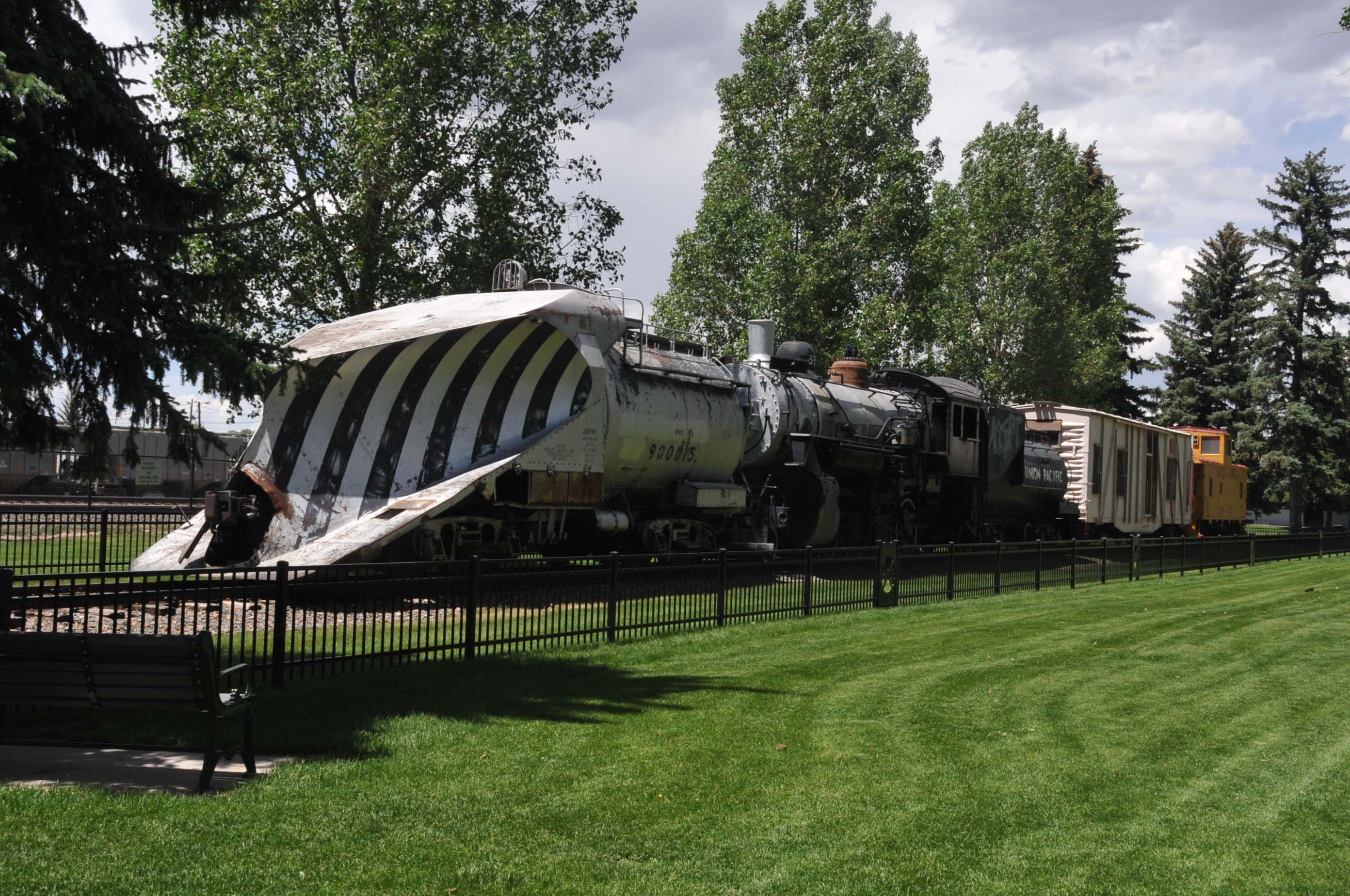

- Location within Wyoming Location within the United States
- Location: S. 1st St. and E. Sheridan St., Laramie, Wyoming
- Coordinates: 41°18′27″N 105°35′47″W
- Area: less than one acre
- Built: 1922
- NRHP reference No.: 13000265
- Added to NRHP: May 8, 2013

The Snow Train Rolling Stock, located in Railroad Heritage Park in Laramie, Wyoming, consists of five pieces of Union Pacific Railroad rolling stock. The five vehicles, which are a snow plow, locomotive, tender, bunk car, and caboose, form a snow train, a type of train used to clear snow from rail lines. The snow plow was built as a tender and converted to a wedge-shaped plow in 1953. The locomotive was built in 1903 and served in Wyoming from 1947 to 1957; it served as part of snow trains in 1949 during a blizzard. The bunk car was originally built as an automobile car in 1929 and became a bunk car in 1955; after its retirement, it served as a ticket office for the Wyoming Colorado Railroad. The tender was built between 1907 and 1920, and the caboose was built in 1955.

Wyoming snow trains did not function as pre-assembled units and were generally put together when they were needed to clear snow. While these five pieces of rolling stock probably never operated together as a snow train, they are nonetheless representative of Wyoming snow trains. The pieces were moved to the park in 2011 from various locations around Laramie.

The Snow Train Rolling Stock was added to the National Register of Historic Places on May 8, 2013.
