= Lehman-Tunnell Mansion =

- U.S. National Register of Historic Places
- Lehman-Tunnell Mansion from E. Grand Ave

- Location within Wyoming
- Location: 618 Grand Ave., Laramie, Wyoming
- Coordinates: 41°18′38″N 105°35′18″W
- Area: 0.3 acres (0.12 ha)
- Built: 1891
- Built by: Frank Cook, Frank Spiegelberg
- Architectural style: Queen Anne
- NRHP reference No.: 82001829
- Added to NRHP: November 8, 1982

The Lehman-Tunnell Mansion, also known as the Tunnell House, is a Queen Anne style residence located in Laramie, Wyoming. Constructed in 1891, this house reflects the popularity of Queen Anne architecture during the late 19th century and is characterized by its asymmetrical design, conical roof, bowed windows, and corbeled chimney.

The house was built by Frank Cook who was a local builder and architect in the Laramie area. The house was originally built for merchant Edward Lehman and his wife Pauline who eventually sold the house in 1919 to Edward's business partner Frank J. Terry. After the house was sold, Frank eventually defaulted on his loan. During a period of bank ownership, the house served for a time as the Kappa Delta sorority house for the University of Wyoming. In 1940 the house was sold to Dr. H.E. Tunnell, a chiropractor, and his wife Ida. Dr. Tunnell died in 1966 and his widow sold the house in 1970.

The rectangular brick house is 2-1/2 stories high with a prominent chimney. The stair landing features a stained glass window with Interior wood work built by Frank Spiegelberg. The house also features a foundation made of rock-faced stone laid in courses, curved arches emphasizing the front windows, a projecting front porch, and a side bay that follows a similar curving line.

The Lehman-Tunnell Mansion was placed on the National Register of Historic Places on November 8, 1982, for its architectural significance and its representation of Queen Anne architecture in Laramie, Wyoming.
