= Vee Bar Ranch Lodge =

Historic house in Wyoming, United States

- U.S. National Register of Historic Places
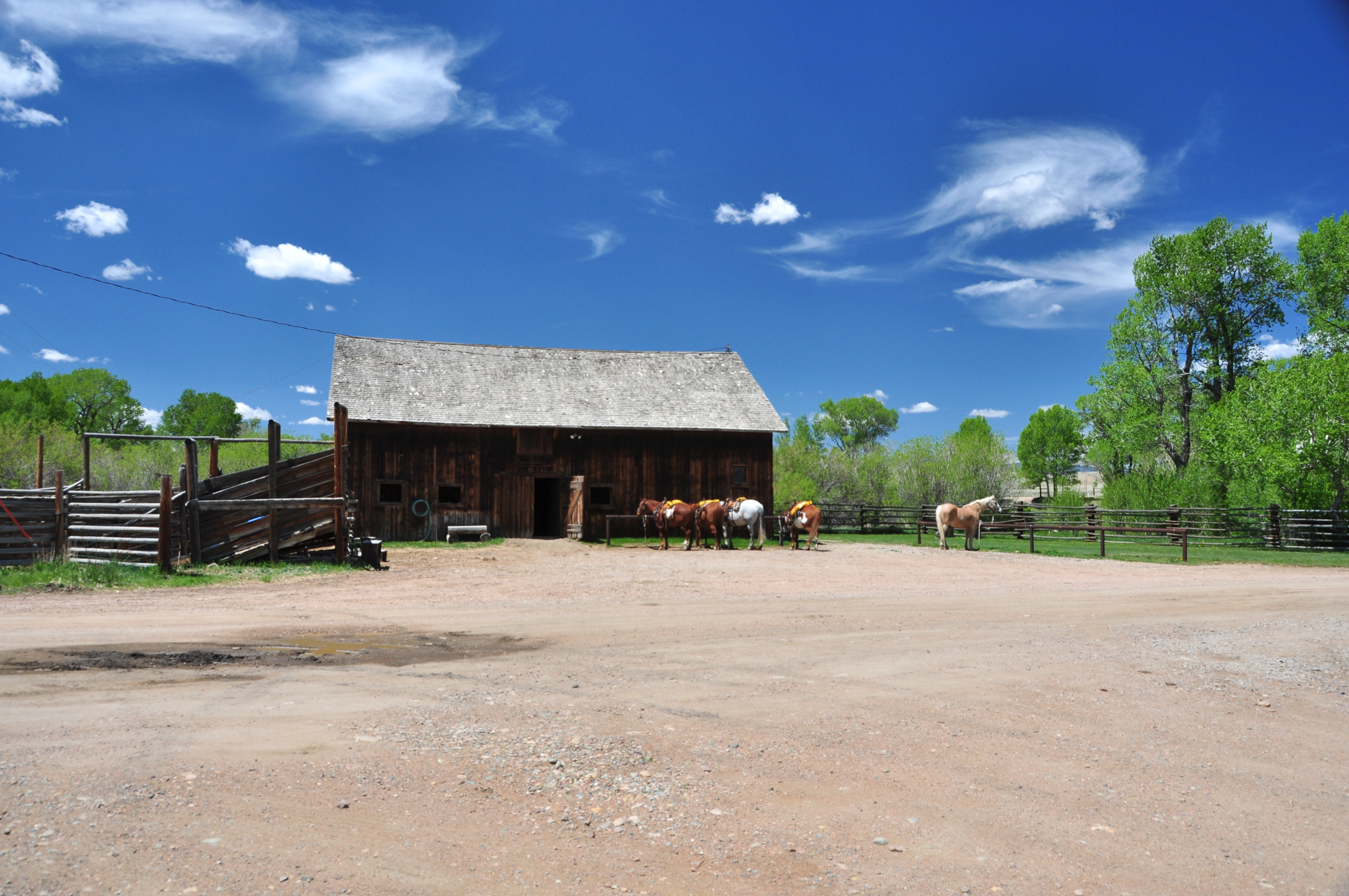

- Location within Wyoming Location within the United States
- Location: Albany County, at 2087 WY 130, Laramie, Wyoming
- Coordinates: 41°17′49″N 106°0′42″W
- Built: 1891
- Architectural style: Late Victorian
- NRHP reference No.: 86001468
- Added to NRHP: June 30, 1986

The Vee Bar Ranch Lodge was built in 1891 as the home of Lionel C.G. Sartoris, a prominent Wyoming rancher. The ranch was later owned by Luther Filmore, a Union Pacific Railroad official, and the Wright family, who operated the ranch as a dude ranch. The property comprises five historic buildings including the lodge, original corral and a stock chute.

Sartoris bought the Vee Bar lands from homesteader Theodore Brubaker in 1890. Sartoris was English in origin, and a partner in the Douglas William Sartoris Cattle Company, which in 1885 was worth an estimated $2 million. By 1892 the company had failed. Sartoris departed for South America and the ranch was taken over by Susan J. Fillmore, who from 1903 leased it to Gordon and Myra Wright. In 1911 the Wrights bought the ranch, adding a second floor to the lodge. Dude ranching began in 1912 to supplement income.

The ranch is situated in a bend of the Little Laramie River with five contributing buildings and supporting ranch structures. The original log lodge was built by the Fillmores in 1901 and expanded in 1911. A modern addition dates to 1975.

The Vee Bar was listed on the National Register of Historic Places in 1986. It continues in operation as a guest ranch.
