= Flying Horseshoe Ranch =

- U.S. National Register of Historic Places
- U.S. Historic district
- Location within Wyoming Location within the United States
- Location: 156 Dinwiddie Road, Centennial, Wyoming
- Nearest city: Centennial, Wyoming
- Coordinates: 41°16′19″N 106°4′54″W
- Area: 20.3 acres (8.2 ha)
- Built: 1883
- Built by: Mads Wobol
- Architectural style: Log
- NRHP reference No.: 00001226
- Added to NRHP: October 12, 2000

The Flying Horseshoe Ranch was established in the Centennial Valley of southeastern Wyoming by Danish immigrant Mads Wolbol in the late 1870s. The complex of mostly log structures, about 15 of which are considered contributing structures.

The main ranch house was built in 1890 and added to several times. It is a 1 1/2-story log structure, now covered by vinyl siding. The original homestead cabin was built in the late 1870s or early 1880s, and is used for storage. Other buildings in the complex include a root cellar, a chicken house, a hog barn, a blacksmith shop and a number of sheds, almost all of which are of log construction. The most significant utility building is a large log barn, built about 1890.

The property remains a working ranch with 2,400 acres (970 ha) of deeded land and rights to 1,600 acres (650 ha) of Forest Service grazing. It was placed on the National Register of Historic Places on October 12, 2000.
