= Snowy Range Lodge =

Historic house in Wyoming, United States

- Libby Lodge
- U.S. National Register of Historic Places
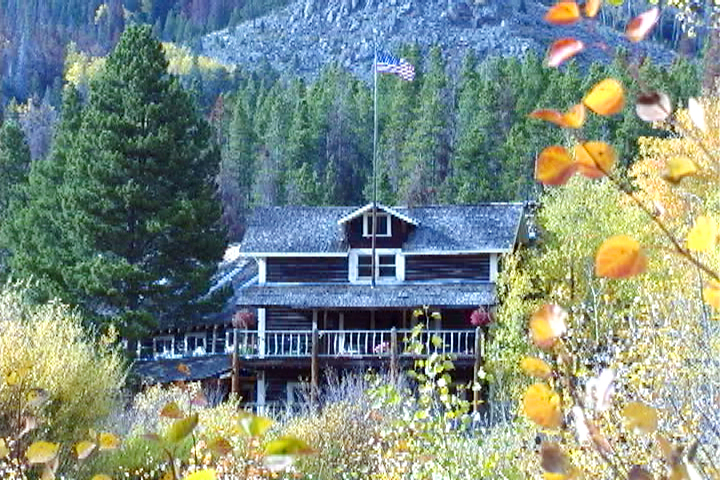

- Location within Wyoming Location within the United States
- Nearest city: Centennial, Wyoming
- Coordinates: 41°19′20″N 106°10′19″W
- Built: 1925
- NRHP reference No.: 76001947
- Added to NRHP: September 30, 1976

The Snowy Range Lodge, formerly known as the Libby Lodge, is located in the Snowy Range of Medicine Bow National Forest in Wyoming. The three-story log lodge was built in 1925 as the Libby Lodge. From 1925 to the mid-1970s, the Lodge served as a classic mountain lodge, sleeping up to 75 people in the main lodge and in ten cabins on 40 acres leased from the US Forest Service. In the mid-1970s, it fell into a state of abandonment, neglect, and disrepair such that the Forest Service planned to burn and bulldoze it as it presented a liability risk to National Forest users who might venture inside.

The Lodge was purchased and rehabilitated by a local family and currently serves as a private residence, and private hire for events (not accommodation).
