= Barn at Oxford Horse Ranch =

- U.S. National Register of Historic Places
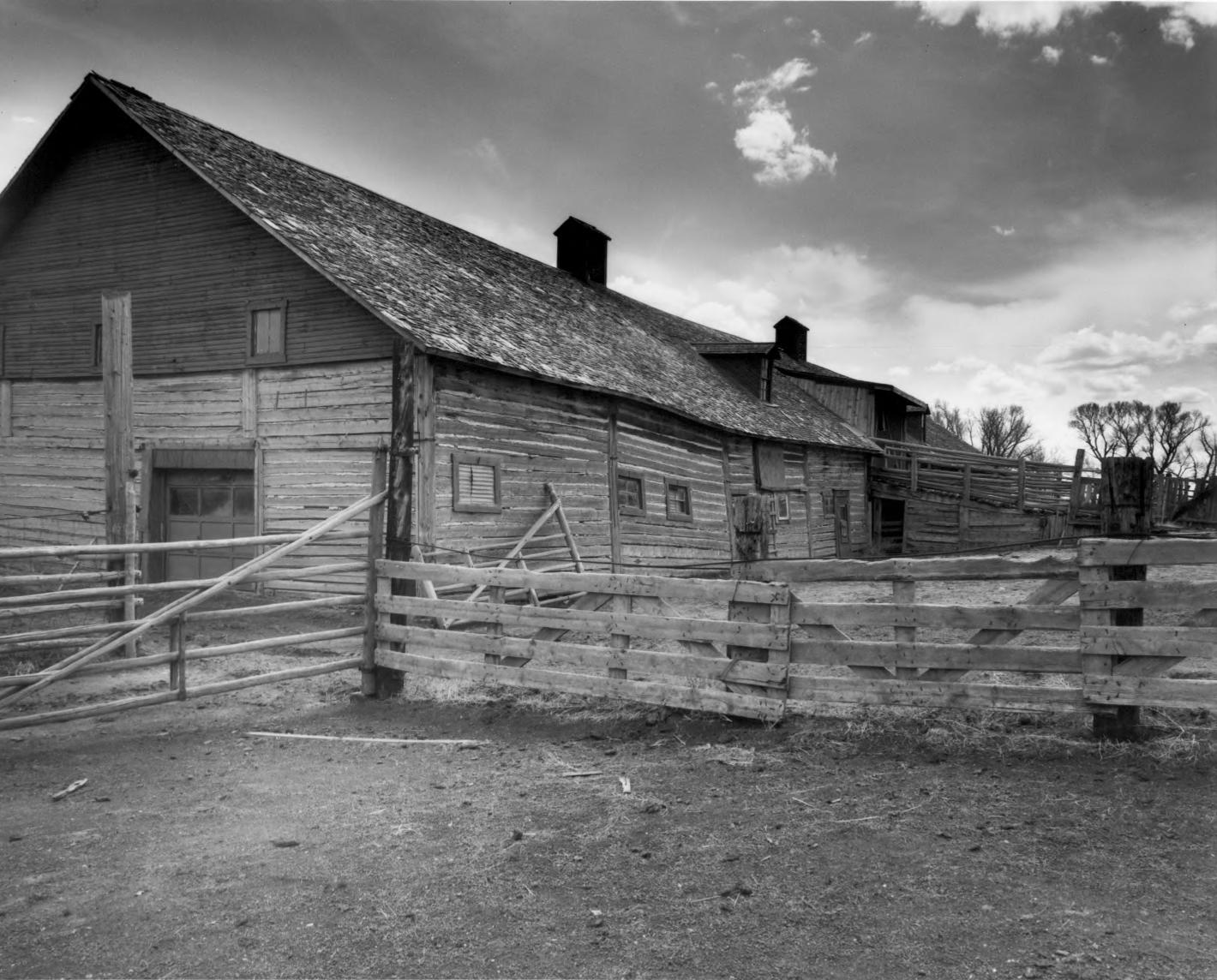
- Oxford Horse Barn in 1986

- Location within Wyoming Location within the United States
- Nearest city: Laramie, Wyoming
- Coordinates: 41°11′18″N 105°35′32″W
- Area: Less than 1 acre (0.40 ha)
- Built: 1887
- NRHP reference No.: 86001398

The Oxford Horse Barn, built in 1887, is located near Laramie, Wyoming in Albany County, Wyoming. It is one of the oldest and largest existing barns in Albany County. The barn in an excellent example of vernacular architecture as influenced by the English cattle and horse ranchers which immigrated to the American West. It is listed on the National Register of Historic Places.

== History ==
The Oxford horse ranch was one of the earliest in the area, being established in the 1870s by Pete Johnson. The ranch was later sold to two Scottish gentlemen named Whitehouse and Stokes. It was under these owners that the ranch gained international recognitions as breeders of pedigreed horses, at times running up to 3,000 head. The Oxford Horse Barn provides important evidence the transplantation of the English upper class thoroughbred horse culture to the Rocky Mountain west and more specifically, Wyoming. The horse barn also played an important role in local history. Most notably it is associated with the name of Axel Palmer, who managed and later became part owner of the ranch on which the barn is located. Palmer trained horses and used the barn loft as a kind of obstacle course for breaking teams.

== Architecture and construction ==
The Oxford House Barn is a massive log barn measuring 158 feet 8 inches long and fifty feet wide. The structure has a distinctive wooden ramp on the back, used for providing wagon access to the loft, and a strict bilateral symmetry of plan and facade. Resting on a sandstone foundation, the barn is constructed of horizontal squared logs mortised into vertical posts at exact 17 foot intervals, which divides the long facade visually into nine equal sections. This construction technique in North America has many names but most common is piece sur piece. Massive ground level sliding doors with original hardware are located in the gable ends and also in the middle and end sections of the long facades.

The rigid, tripartite, bilateral symmetry of the barn justifies considering it an agricultural manifestation of the "Georgian vernacular" tradition of England and the eastern U.S.
