= Laramie Downtown Historic District =

Historic district in Wyoming, United States

- U.S. National Register of Historic Places
- U.S. Historic district
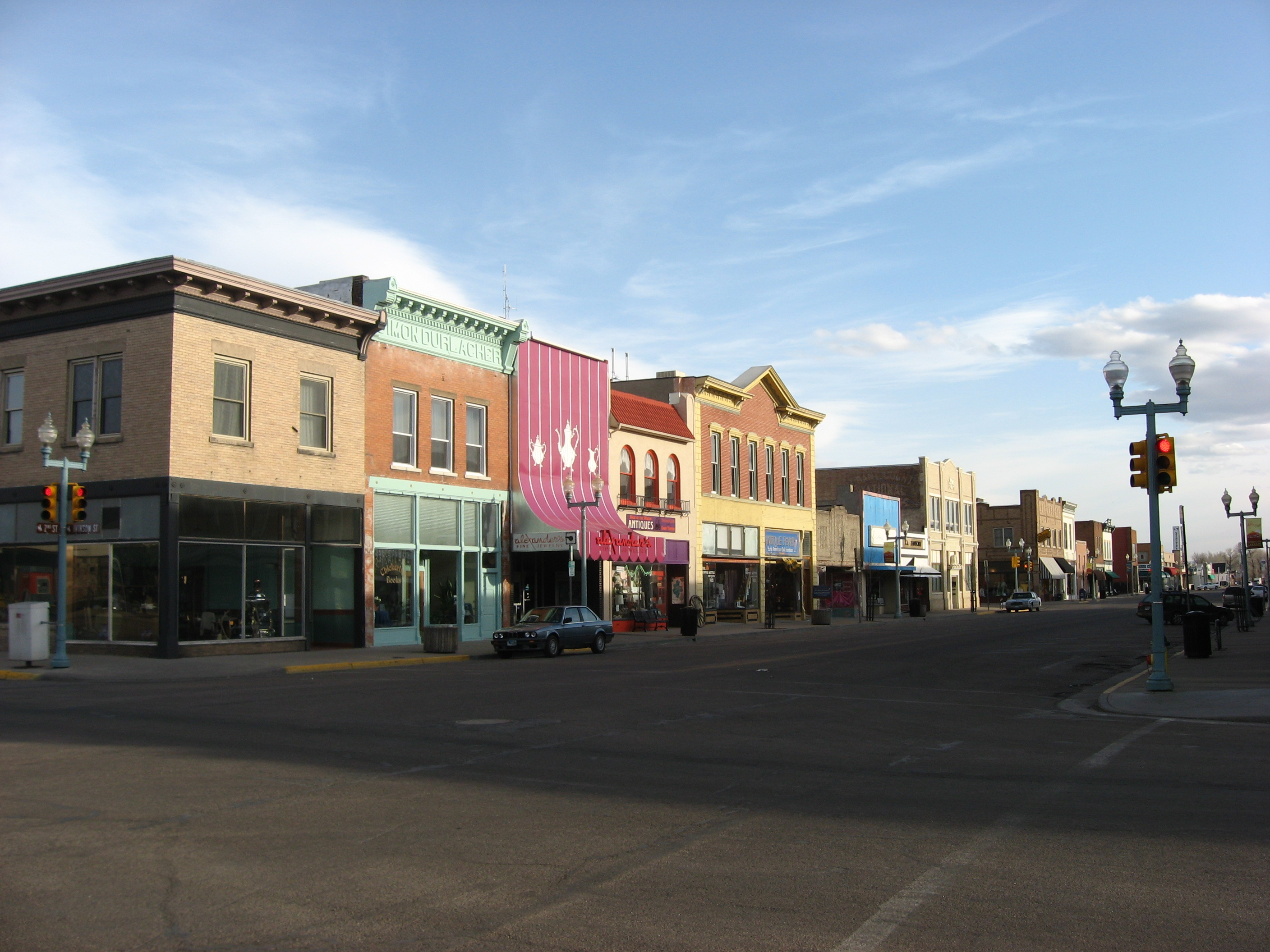
- Downtown Laramie in 2009
- Location: Roughly bounded by University Ave., 6th St., Grand Ave., 3rd St., Garfield Ave., and 1st Ave., Laramie, Wyoming
- Coordinates: 41°18′35″N 105°35′38″W
- Area: 32 acres (13 ha)
- Architectural style: Late 19th And Early 20th Century American Movements, Late Victorian, Victorian Commercial
- NRHP reference No.: 88002541
- Added to NRHP: November 10, 1988

The Laramie Downtown Historic District comprises the historic core of Laramie, Wyoming. Established in 1868, Laramie owes its existence to the Union Pacific Railway, which chose the site and began selling property. By 1871 Laramie was the county seat of Albany County. The historic district includes many buildings dating to the earliest days of Laramie as well as railroad-related structures built between 1870 and 1938. 59 buildings are considered to be contributing structures in the 10-1/2 square block area.

Downtown Laramie was placed on the National Register of Historic Places on November 10, 1988.
