= Vedauwoo =

Climbing area in Wyoming, United States

Coordinates: 41°09′18″N 105°22′54″W

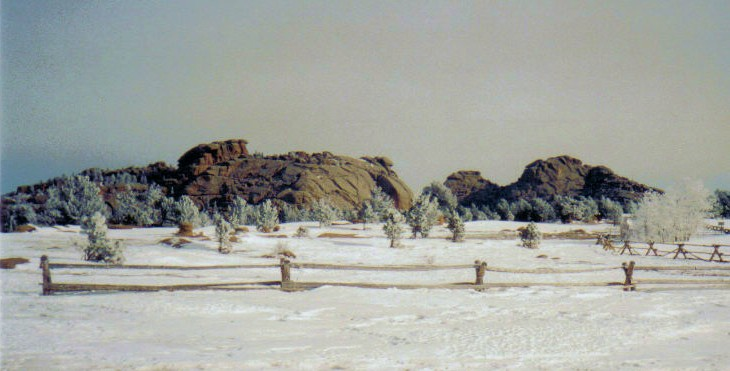
Vedauwoo Rocks in winter

Vedauwoo (/ˈviːdəvuː/) is an area of rocky outcrops (Sherman Granite) located in southeastern Wyoming, United States, north of Interstate 80, between Laramie and Cheyenne. Its name, according to some, is a romanized version of the Arapaho word "bito'o'wu" meaning "earth-born".

Vedauwoo is located in the Medicine Bow - Routt National Forest in the Pole Mountain Recreation Area. It has day-use picnic areas, an overnight campground, dispersed campsites, and trails. It is also a popular climbing area.

Interstate 80 passes just south of the main rock outcroppings and well-marked highway signs indicate the exit to use in order to reach Vedauwoo. An alternative is to drive in from the Happy Jack road that runs between Laramie and Cheyenne.

== Overview ==
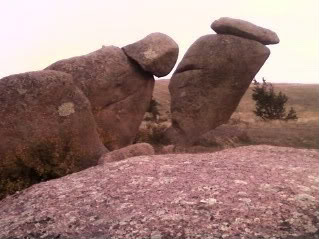
Granite rock formations at Vedauwoo

The 1.4 billion year old Sherman Granite is the rock formation that makes up Vedauwoo's characteristic hoodoos and outcrops. The formation represent one of the oldest that outcrops in Wyoming (but it still more than a billion years younger than the rocks of the Tetons). It is exposed at the surface around Vedauwoo due to the uplift of the Laramie Mountains that began around 70 million years ago. Younger layers of rock and sediment have been progressively eroded in process that continues to this day. The hard granite of Vedauwoo is made of large crystals of quartz, orthoclase, plagioclase, and some mica and is more erosion-resistant, resulting in wind and water-sculpted forms. Just east of Vedauwoo, along I-80, sandstone cliffs are formed by the Permian-age Fountain Formation, which is about 300 million years old. The ancient sand dunes of a broad desert met with the salty waters of a shallow, epicontinental sea, producing examples of cross-stratification. Fossils of sea urchins, snails, and sea lilies can be found in some of these rocks.

Wildlife abounds in and around Vedauwoo with Wyoming ground squirrels, mule deer, elk, moose, yellow-bellied marmots, least chipmunks, pronghorn, wild turkeys, badger, prairie dog, coyote, and mountain lions all calling the area home. Beaver are found in some of the creeks, where their dams and lodges form cover for a variety of aquatic insects, frogs, and fish. Golden and bald eagles can be seen soaring on the thermals alongside hawks, crow, ravens, turkey vulture, and numerous songbirds. Anglers find brook trout in the streams and ponds but over the past decade or so the populations of these fish have dropped noticeably.

== Climbing ==
TJ Burr, Author and Mountaineer, tells about his experiences at Vedauwoo in his adventure book, Rocky Mountain Adventure Collection. The following is an excerpt from the chapter, Bouldering at Vedauwoo: ″The Vedauwoo rocks are large blocks of weathered Sherman granite primarily composed of crystalline fragments of quartz and feldspar. The higher concentration of feldspar gives the rocks a pinkish tint. They are grouped together in large granite towers formed by stacks of huge rectangular blocks that have been rounded by windblown sand. They provide some of North America's best technical climbs. Although they lack cracks and holds, they provide excellent friction and chimney climbs. Living only fifteen miles from Vedauwoo while attending the University of Wyoming, I had the privilege of spending many weekends climbing, rappelling, and hiking around the rocky wonderland. Vedauwoo provides a welcome outlet for many stressed college students. It is also frequented by technical climbers, family picnickers, and campers. On any given day with nice Wyoming weather, there will be numerous climbers testing their skills on the vertical rock faces of the Vedauwoo Recreation Area.″

Vedauwoo is particularly known for its offwidth crack climbing.

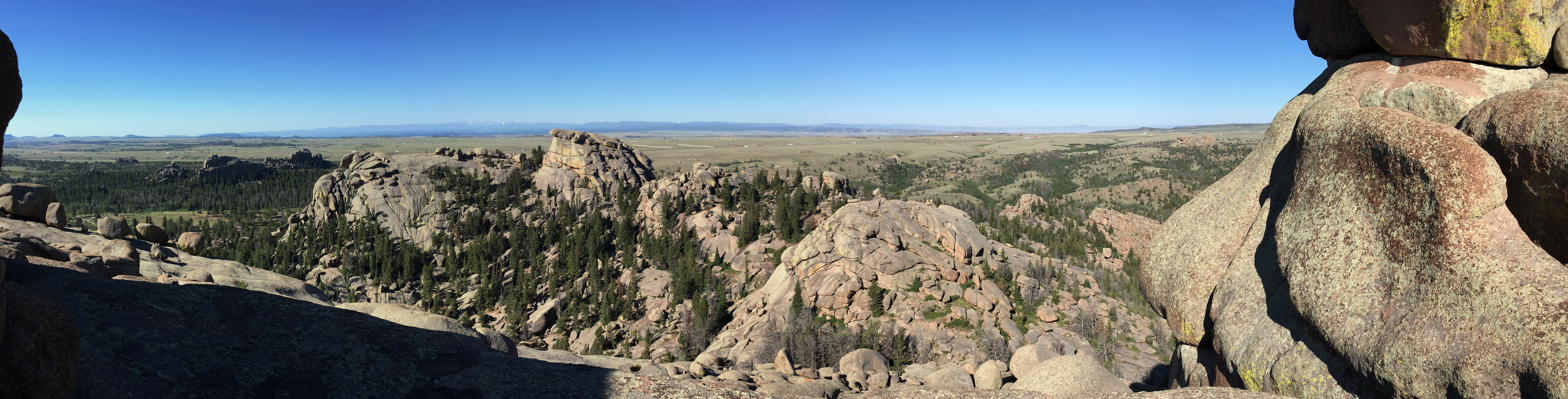
Panorama of Vedauwoo from on a granite outcrop
