= Cooper Mansion (Laramie, Wyoming) =

Historic house in Wyoming, United States

- U.S. National Register of Historic Places
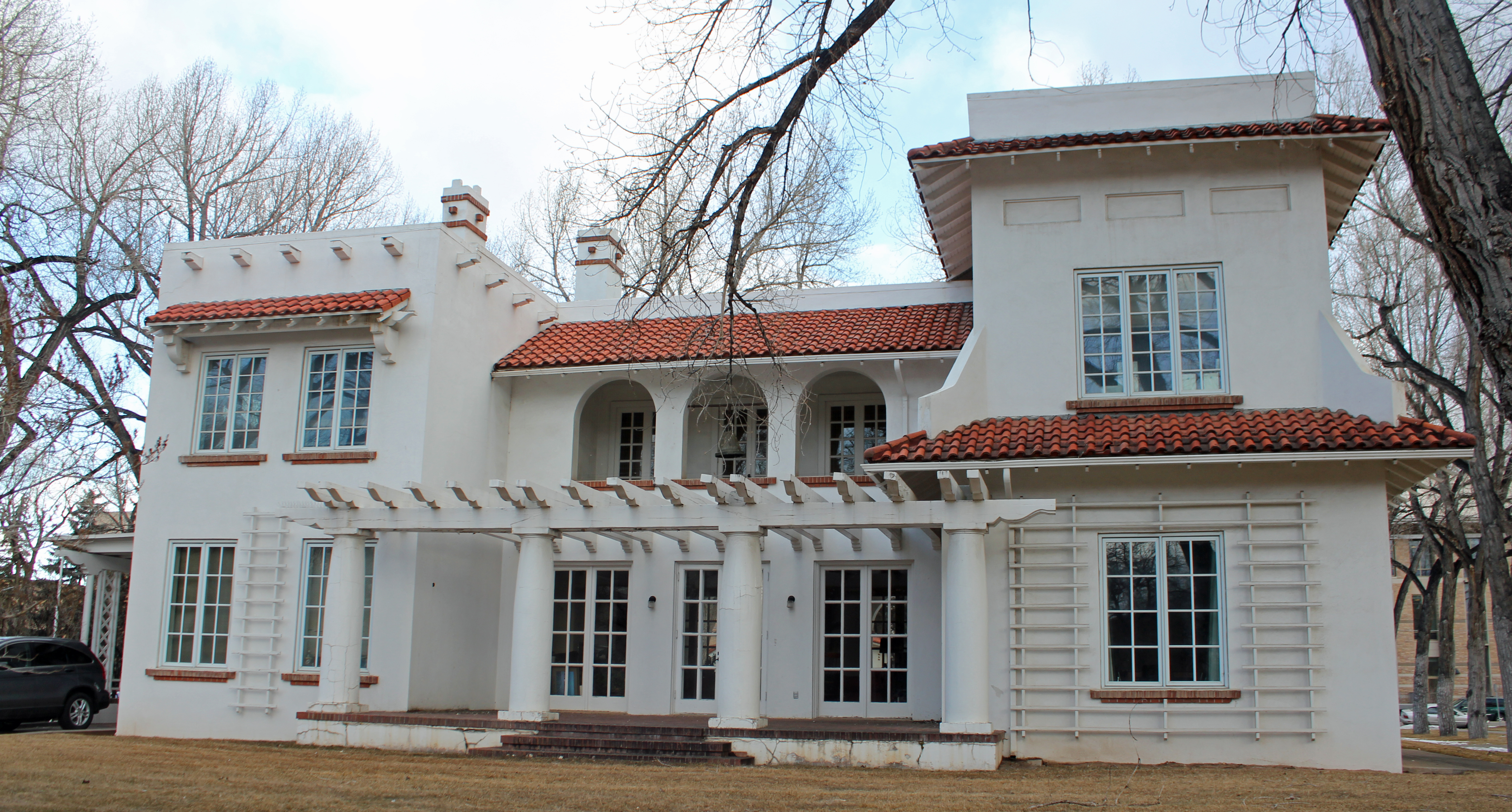

- Location within Wyoming Location within the United States
- Location: 1411 Grand Ave., Laramie, Wyoming
- Coordinates: 41°18′38″N 105°34′42″W
- Area: 1.5 acres (0.61 ha)
- Built: 1921
- NRHP reference No.: 83003359
- Added to NRHP: August 8, 1983

The Cooper Mansion is a property in Laramie, Wyoming, that is on the National Register of Historic Places. It was built in 1921, when Richard, Barbara, and John Cooper, who inherited from their father, Frank Cooper's, vast estate of mineral rights, which people had to be a resident of the United States to access. The house was designed by Wilbur Hitchcock. Barbara Cooper died in 1979, and the University of Wyoming bought it in 1980. It currently houses the American Studies program at the university.
