= Union Pacific Athletic Club =

- U.S. National Register of Historic Places
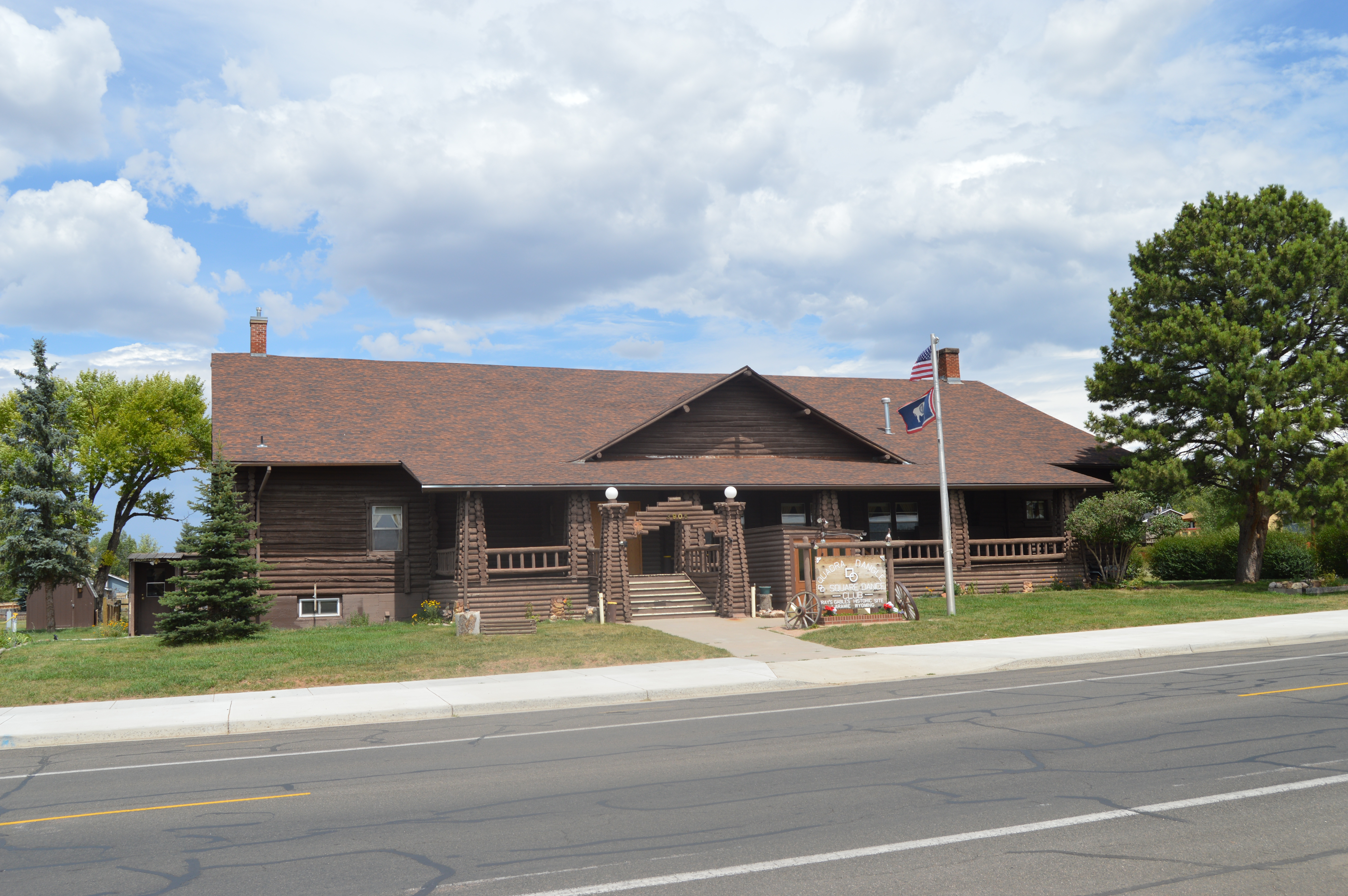

- Location within Wyoming Location within the United States
- Location: Off U.S. 30, Laramie, Wyoming
- Coordinates: 41°19′16″N 105°32′49″W
- Area: 4 acres (1.6 ha)
- Built: 1928
- Architect: Mads Justesen, Jack Haugum
- Architectural style: Log Cabin style
- NRHP reference No.: 78002814
- Added to NRHP: September 13, 1978

The Union Pacific Athletic Club in Laramie, Wyoming, was built in 1928. Also known as Gray's Gables and as the Quadra Dangle Square Dance Clubhouse, it was built in log cabin style by Mads Justesen and Jack Haugum. It was listed on the National Register of Historic Places in 1978.
