= Laramie, Wyoming =

- City
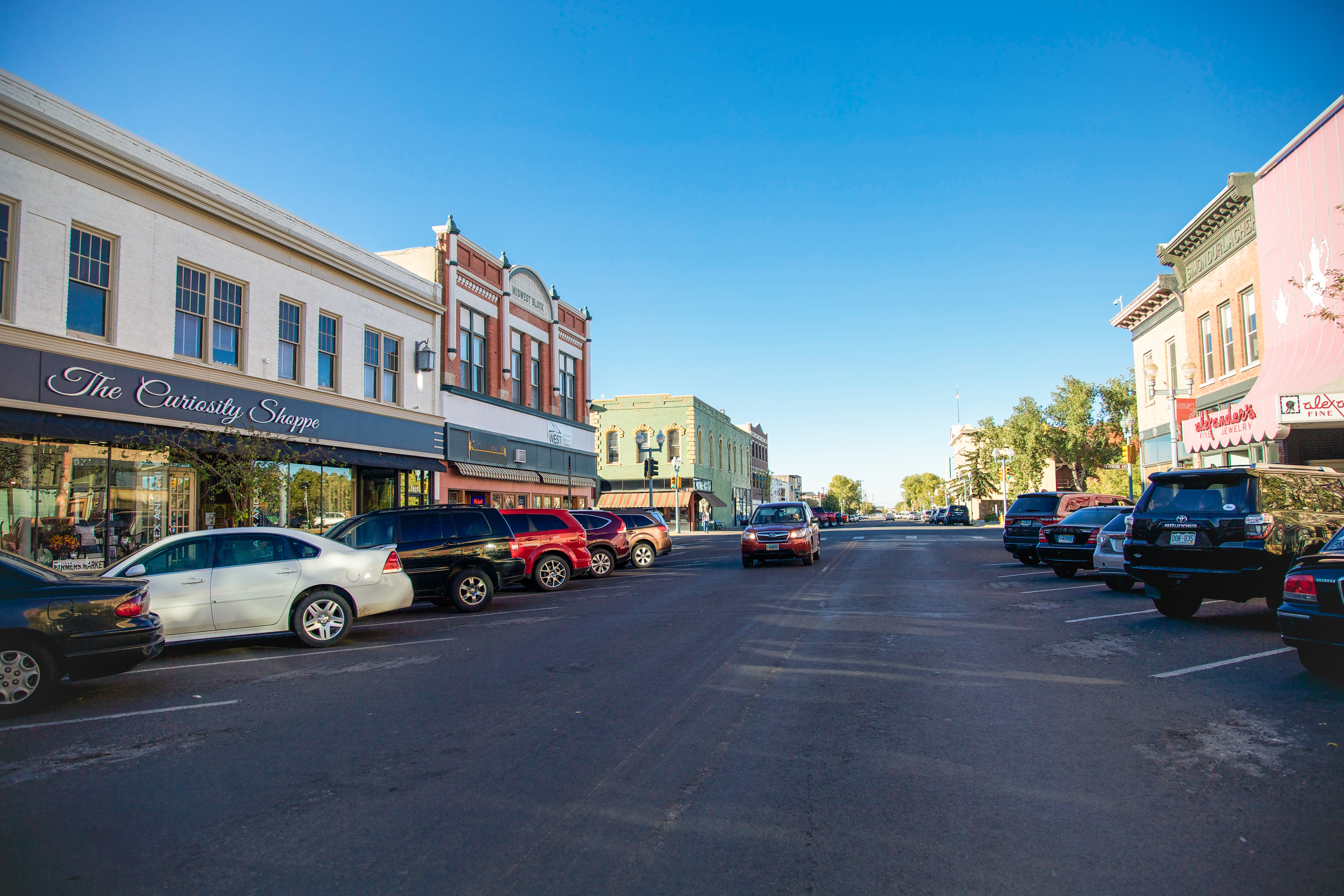
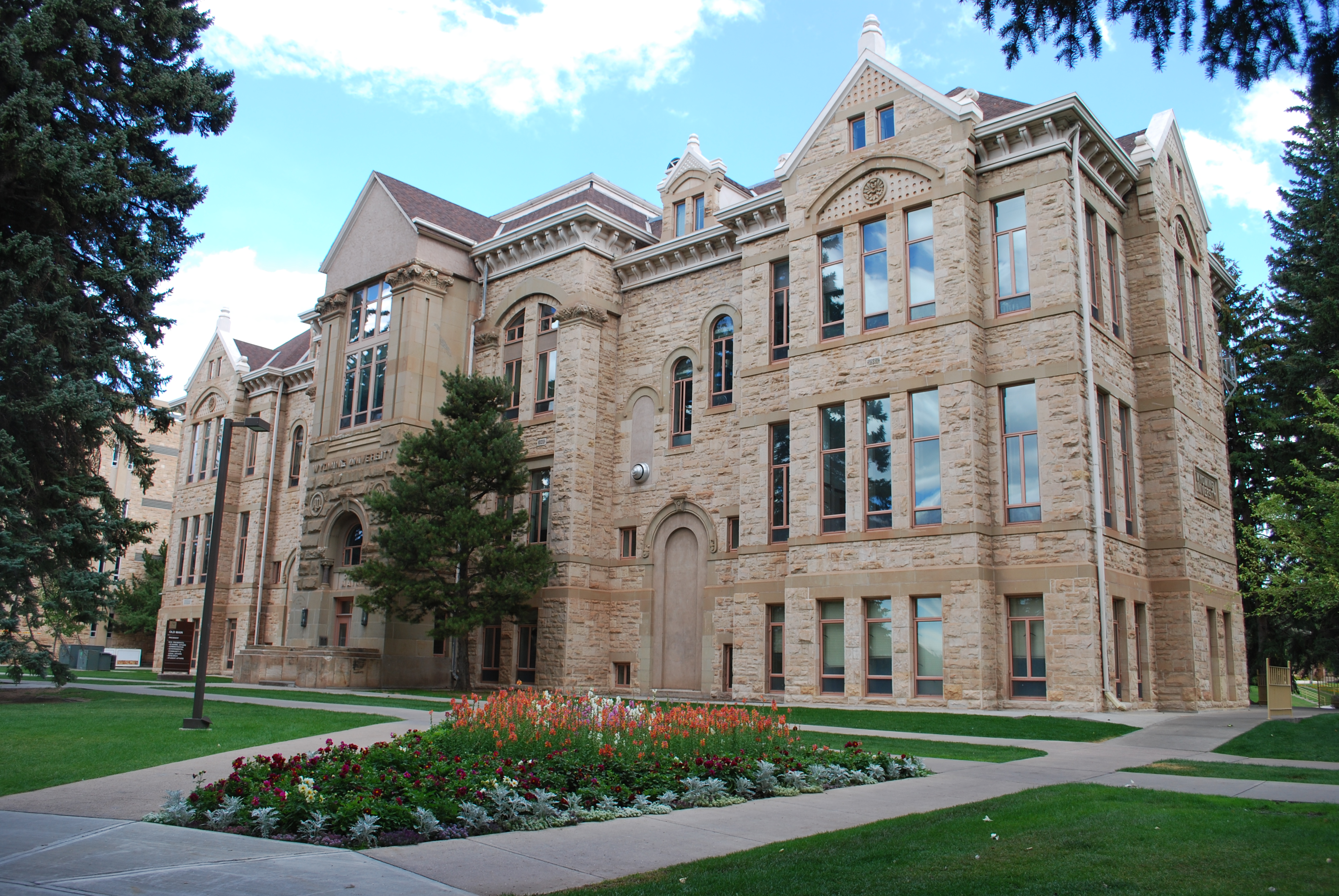
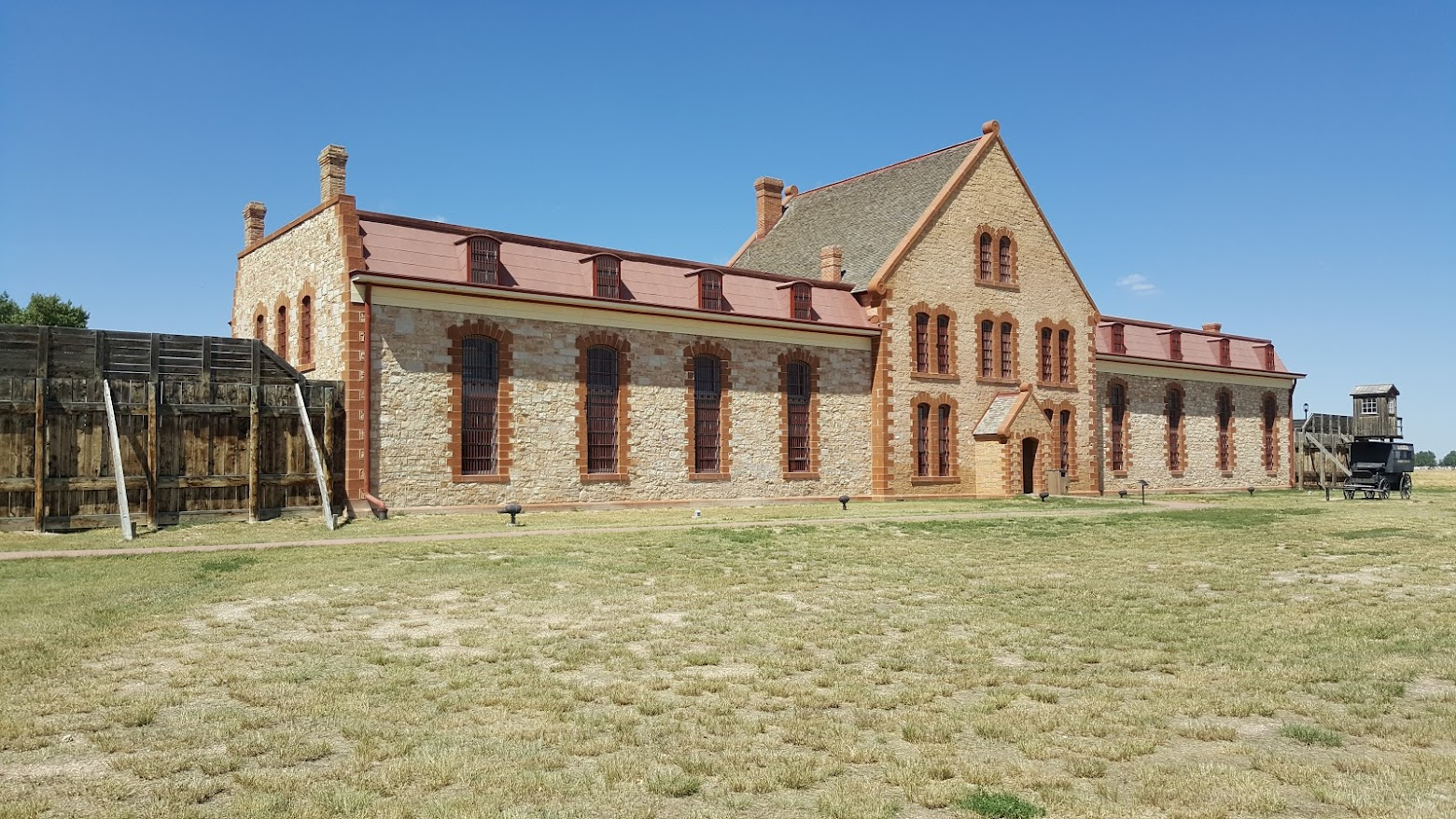
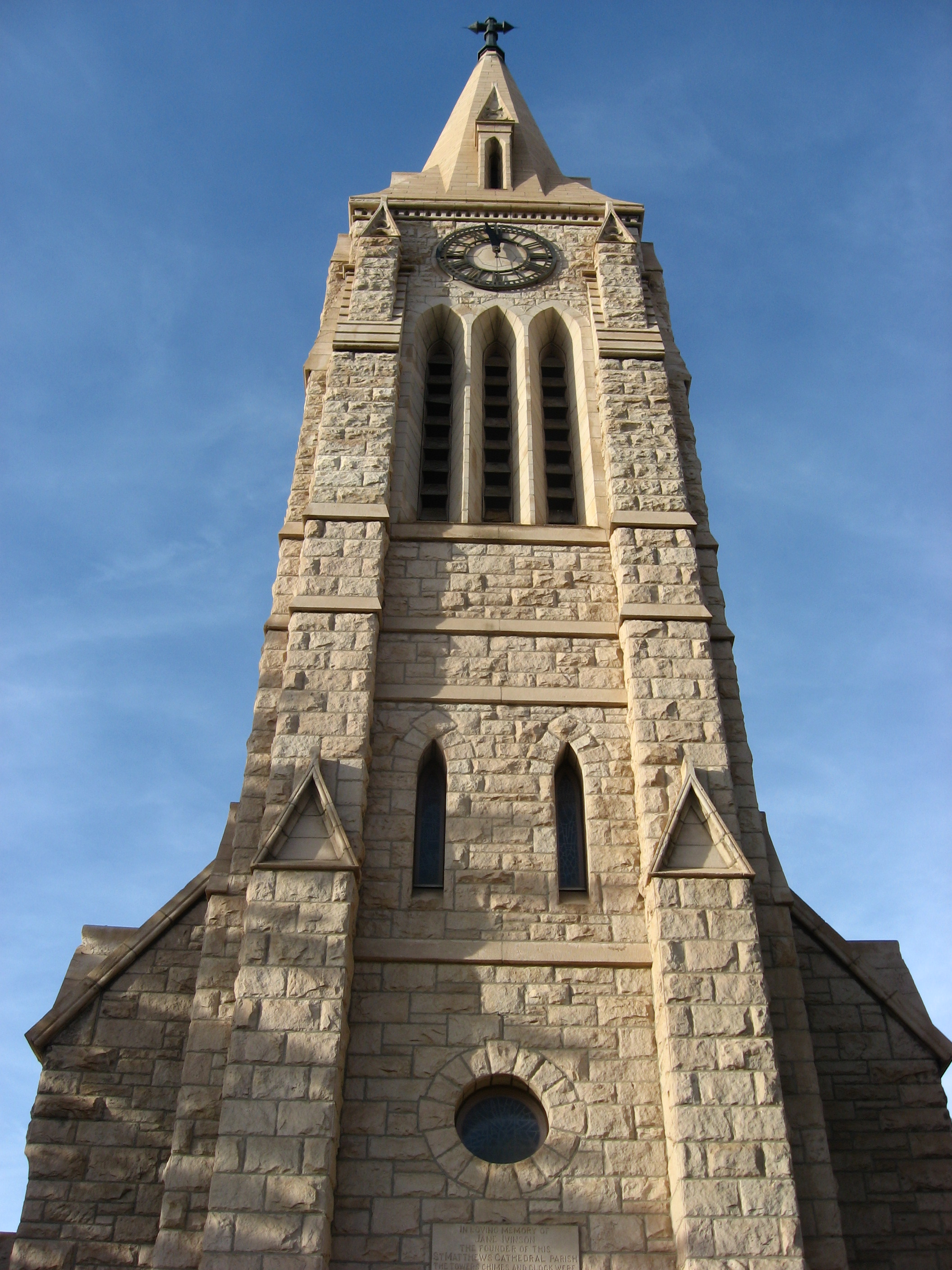
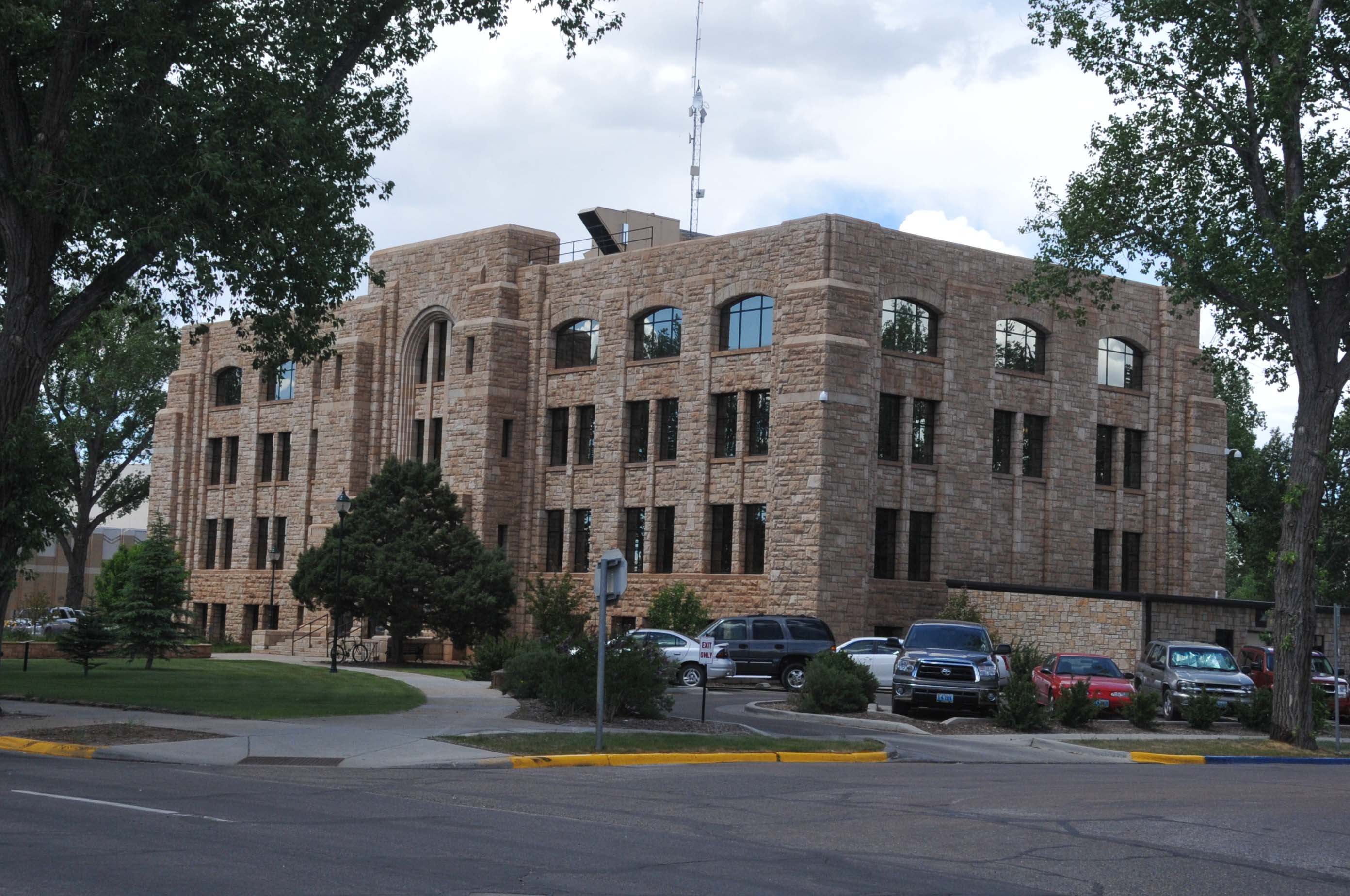
- Downtown Laramie University of Wyoming Wyoming Territorial Prison St. Matthew's Cathedral Albany County Courthouse

- Seal Logo
- Motto: Gem City of the Plains
- Location in Albany County and the state of Wyoming.
- Coordinates: 41°18′40″N 105°35′37″W
- Country: United States
- State: Wyoming
- County: Albany
- Founded: mid-1860s
- Incorporated: January 13, 1874

Government
  - Type: Council–manager
  - Mayor: Sharon Cumbie

Area
  - City: 18.38 sq mi (47.61 km^{2})
  - Land: 18.36 sq mi (47.55 km^{2})
  - Water: 0.023 sq mi (0.06 km^{2})
- Elevation: 7,165 ft (2,184 m)

Population (2020)
  - City: 31,407
  - Density: 1,816.0/sq mi (701.16/km^{2})
  - Metro: 38,943
- Time zone: UTC−7 (MST)
  - Summer (DST): UTC−6 (MDT)
- ZIP Codes: 82070, 82072
- Area code: 307
- FIPS code: 56-45050
- GNIS feature ID: 1590526
- Website: www.cityoflaramie.org

Laramie (/ˈlærəmi/) is a city in and the county seat of Albany County, Wyoming, United States, known for its high elevation at 7,220 feet (2,200 m), for its railroad history, and as the home of the University of Wyoming. The population was 31,407 at the 2020 census, making it the fourth-most populous city in Wyoming. Located on the Laramie River, the city is west of Cheyenne and 25 miles (40 km) north of the Colorado state line, at the junction of Interstate 80 and U.S. Route 287.

After 12,000 years or more of Indigenous populations living in the area, Laramie was settled by European Americans in 1868 with the completion of the Union Pacific Railroad line to the area, which crosses the Laramie River at Laramie. The river and several creeks fed by freshwater springs made the area an attractive place for settlement. It is home to the University of Wyoming, WyoTech, and a branch of Laramie County Community College. Laramie Regional Airport serves Laramie. The ruins of Fort Sanders, an army fort predating Laramie, lie just south of the city along Route 287. Located in the Laramie Valley between the Snowy Range and the Laramie Range, the city draws outdoor enthusiasts with its abundance of outdoor activities.

== Etymology ==
Laramie is named for Jacques La Ramée, a French or French-Canadian trapper who disappeared in the Laramie Mountains in the early 1820s. He was one of the first Europeans to visit the area. European-American settlers named a river, mountain range, peak, US Army fort, county, and city for him. More Wyoming landmarks are named for him than for any other trapper but Jim Bridger.

== Founding ==
Before European colonization, the Laramie area was home to Native American tribes, specifically the Arapaho and Cheyenne people.

The city was founded in the mid-1860s as a tent city near the Overland Stage Line route, the Union Pacific portion of the first transcontinental railroad, and just north of Fort Sanders army post. The rails reached Laramie on May 4, 1868, when construction crews worked through town. A few passengers arrived on that same day. The first regular passenger service began on May 10, 1868, by which time entrepreneurs were building more permanent structures. Laramie City (as it was known in early years) soon had stores, houses, a school, and churches. Laramie's fame as the western terminal of the Union Pacific Railroad, acquired when the 268-mile (431 km) section from North Platte, Nebraska, was opened in May, ended in early August 1868 when a 93-mile (150 km) section of track was opened to Benton, 6 miles (9.7 km) east of present-day Sinclair, Wyoming.

The frontier town initially suffered from lawlessness. Its first mayor, M. C. Brown, resigned his office on June 12, 1868, after six turbulent weeks, saying that the other officials elected alongside him on May 2 were guilty of "incapacity and laxity" in dealing with the city's problems. This was due to the threat to the community from three half-brothers, early Old West gunman "Big" Steve Long, Con Moyer and Ace Moyer. Long was Laramie's first marshal, and with his brothers owned the saloon Bucket of Blood. The three began harassing settlers, forcing them to sign over the deeds to their property to them. Any who refused were killed, usually goaded into a gunfight by Long. By October 1868, Long had killed 13 men.

The first Albany County sheriff, rancher N. K. Boswell, organized a "Vigilance Committee" in response. On October 28, 1868, Boswell led the committee into the Bucket of Blood, overwhelmed the three brothers, and lynched them at an unfinished cabin down the street. Through a series of other lynchings and other forms of intimidation, the vigilantes reduced the "unruly element" and established a semblance of law and order.

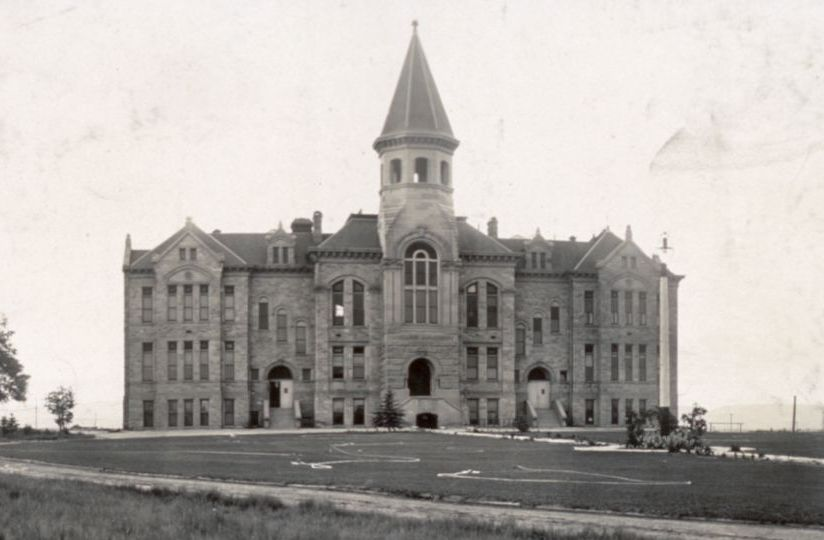
"Old Main" building at the University of Wyoming in Laramie, 1908

By the end of the decade, Laramie became the cultural and economic center of the newly organized Wyoming Territory. In 1869, Wyoming's first legislature passed a bill granting equal political rights to women in the territory. In March 1870, five Laramie residents became the first women in the world to serve on a jury. As Laramie was the first town in Wyoming to hold a municipal election, on September 6, 1870, Laramie resident Louisa Swain was the first woman in the United States to cast a legal vote in a general election, seven months after the territorial suffrage act took effect.

Laramie was officially incorporated on January 13, 1874.

Early businesses included rolling mills, a railroad-tie treatment plant, a brick yard, a slaughterhouse, a brewery, a glass manufacturing plant, and a plaster mill, as well as the railroad yards. In 1886, a plant to produce electricity was built. Several regional railroads were based in Laramie, including the Laramie, North Park and Pacific Railroad and Telegraph Company founded in 1880 and the Laramie, North Park and Western Railroad established in 1901.

Governor Francis E. Warren signed a bill that established the University of Wyoming (UW) in 1886, the only public university in the state. Laramie was chosen as its site, and UW opened there in 1887. Under the terms of the Morrill Act, also known as the Land Grant College Act, in 1891 UW added an agricultural college and experiment station to gain benefits as a land grant college.

=== Late 20th century to present ===
The city was covered by international media in 1998 after the murder of Matthew Shepard, a gay student at the University of Wyoming. His murder generated an international outcry. It became the symbolic focus for a nationwide campaign against gay hate crimes. Federal hate crimes legislation was signed into law in 2009. As of May 2023, Wyoming does not have a hate crimes law, having failed to pass its most recent attempt at a hate crimes law in March 2021. Shepard's murder was the subject of the award-winning play, later adapted as a movie, The Laramie Project.

In 2004, Laramie became the first city in Wyoming to pass a law to prohibit smoking in enclosed workplaces, including bars, restaurants and private clubs. Opponents of the clean indoor air ordinance, funded in part by the R. J. Reynolds Tobacco Company, immediately petitioned to have the ordinance repealed. However, the voters upheld the ordinance in a citywide referendum which was conducted concurrently with the 2004 general election. The opponents challenged the validity of the election in court, claiming various irregularities. The judge ruled that the opponents had failed to meet their burden of showing significant problems with the election, and the ordinance, which had become effective in April 2005, remained in effect. In August 2005, Laramie's City Council defeated an attempt to amend the ordinance to allow smoking in bars and private clubs.

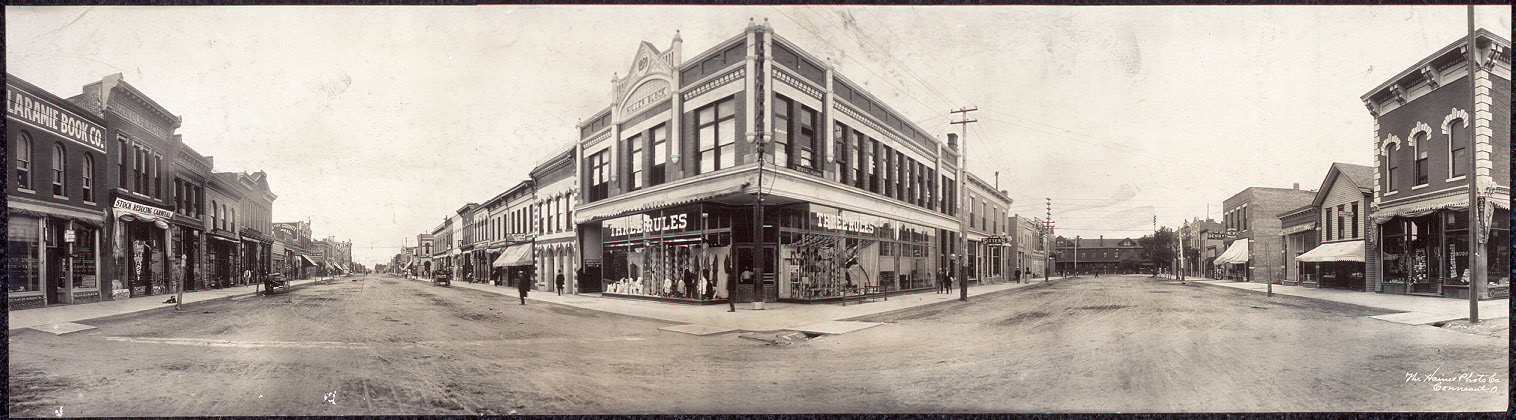
Laramie, 1908

== Geography ==
According to the United States Census Bureau, the city has a total area of 17.76 square miles (46.00 km^{2}), of which 17.74 square miles (45.95 km^{2}) is land and 0.02 square miles (0.05 km^{2}) is water.

Laramie is on a high plain between two mountain ranges, the Snowy Range, about 30 miles (48 km) to the west, and the Laramie Range, 7 miles (11 km) to the east. The city's elevation above sea level is approximately 7,165 feet (2,184 m). The Laramie River runs through Laramie toward its confluence with the North Platte River east of the Laramie Range.

The city is about 50 miles (80 km) west of Cheyenne, and 130 miles (209 km) north of Denver, Colorado. Laramie lies along U.S. Route 30, Interstate 80, and U.S. Route 287, and it remains an important junction on the Union Pacific Railroad line.

=== Climate ===
Laramie has a cold semi-arid climate (Köppen BSk) with long, cold, dry winters and short, warm, somewhat wetter summers.

Laramie's total precipitation averages about 11 inches (280 mm) a year, and the average number of rainy days per year is about 86. The city experiences an afternoon that is 90 °F (32.2 °C) or hotter 2.2 times a year, and a morning that is 0 °F (−17.8 °C) or colder 23 times in an average year. The average temperature in December is 21.1 °F (−6.1 °C), and in July it is 64.0 °F (17.8 °C). Annual snowfall averages 48 inches or 1.2 meters, although there is no record of more than 20 inches or 0.51 meters on the ground. Because of the high elevation, winters are long, and summers short and relatively cool. The growing season is short, as the average window for freezing temperatures is September 14 through June 6, while for accumulating (≥0.1 inches or 0.0025 meters) snow it is October 5 through May 12.

Climate data for Laramie, Wyoming (Laramie Regional Airport), 1991–2020 normals, extremes 1892–present
Month	Jan	Feb	Mar	Apr	May	Jun	Jul	Aug	Sep	Oct	Nov	Dec	Year
Record high °F (°C)	60 (16)	63 (17)	71 (22)	77 (25)	87 (31)	94 (34)	96 (36)	94 (34)	91 (33)	87 (31)	70 (21)	62 (17)	94 (34)
Mean maximum °F (°C)	49.6 (9.8)	52.1 (11.2)	62.1 (16.7)	69.7 (20.9)	78.2 (25.7)	86.5 (30.3)	89.7 (32.1)	87.2 (30.7)	83.4 (28.6)	73.6 (23.1)	61.1 (16.2)	51.1 (10.6)	90.1 (32.3)
Mean daily maximum °F (°C)	33.4 (0.8)	35.6 (2.0)	44.5 (6.9)	51.2 (10.7)	61.5 (16.4)	73.9 (23.3)	81.1 (27.3)	79.0 (26.1)	70.2 (21.2)	56.0 (13.3)	42.5 (5.8)	32.7 (0.4)	55.1 (12.8)
Daily mean °F (°C)	21.9 (−5.6)	23.8 (−4.6)	31.8 (−0.1)	37.9 (3.3)	47.5 (8.6)	58.0 (14.4)	64.8 (18.2)	62.8 (17.1)	54.3 (12.4)	41.9 (5.5)	30.2 (−1.0)	21.5 (−5.8)	41.4 (5.2)
Mean daily minimum °F (°C)	10.3 (−12.1)	12.1 (−11.1)	19.2 (−7.1)	24.5 (−4.2)	33.4 (0.8)	42.0 (5.6)	48.5 (9.2)	46.5 (8.1)	38.5 (3.6)	27.8 (−2.3)	18.0 (−7.8)	10.2 (−12.1)	27.6 (−2.4)
Mean minimum °F (°C)	−15.0 (−26.1)	−12.2 (−24.6)	−2.3 (−19.1)	7.5 (−13.6)	18.8 (−7.3)	31.9 (−0.1)	39.5 (4.2)	37.8 (3.2)	25.1 (−3.8)	5.3 (−14.8)	−7.4 (−21.9)	−17.0 (−27.2)	−24.4 (−31.3)
Record low °F (°C)	−50 (−46)	−42 (−41)	−35 (−37)	−14 (−26)	5 (−15)	22 (−6)	30 (−1)	27 (−3)	−2 (−19)	−26 (−32)	−26 (−32)	−34 (−37)	−50 (−46)
Average precipitation inches (mm)	0.28 (7.1)	0.32 (8.1)	0.48 (12)	1.04 (26)	1.75 (44)	1.49 (38)	1.34 (34)	1.14 (29)	1.11 (28)	0.83 (21)	0.42 (11)	0.32 (8.1)	10.52 (267)
Average snowfall inches (cm)	4.6 (12)	5.9 (15)	8.4 (21)	8.3 (21)	3.5 (8.9)	0.2 (0.51)	0.0 (0.0)	0.0 (0.0)	0.8 (2.0)	3.3 (8.4)	7.7 (20)	7.0 (18)	49.7 (126)
Average extreme snow depth inches (cm)	4 (10)	3 (7.6)	4 (10)	2 (5.1)	2 (5.1)	0 (0)	0 (0)	0 (0)	0 (0)	2 (5.1)	3 (7.6)	4 (10)	6 (15)
Average precipitation days (≥ 0.01 in)	4.4	5.1	5.9	8.6	11.3	8.4	9.3	9.4	7.3	6.3	5.1	4.9	86.0
Average snowy days (≥ 0.1 in)	5.2	5.5	6.1	5.6	2.3	0.2	0.0	0.0	0.6	2.6	6.0	5.5	39.6
Source: NOAA (snow 1981–2010)

Climate data for Laramie 2 NW, Wyoming, 1991–2020 normals, extremes 1966–present
Month	Jan	Feb	Mar	Apr	May	Jun	Jul	Aug	Sep	Oct	Nov	Dec	Year
Record high °F (°C)	62 (17)	68 (20)	72 (22)	78 (26)	88 (31)	94 (34)	97 (36)	97 (36)	92 (33)	85 (29)	72 (22)	63 (17)	97 (36)
Mean maximum °F (°C)	50.5 (10.3)	52.9 (11.6)	62.5 (16.9)	70.4 (21.3)	78.5 (25.8)	86.0 (30.0)	90.8 (32.7)	88.9 (31.6)	84.4 (29.1)	75.2 (24.0)	62.1 (16.7)	51.8 (11.0)	91.3 (32.9)
Mean daily maximum °F (°C)	33.6 (0.9)	36.1 (2.3)	45.0 (7.2)	51.2 (10.7)	61.6 (16.4)	73.0 (22.8)	80.7 (27.1)	78.8 (26.0)	70.5 (21.4)	56.5 (13.6)	43.0 (6.1)	33.0 (0.6)	55.3 (12.9)
Daily mean °F (°C)	20.9 (−6.2)	23.4 (−4.8)	31.6 (−0.2)	37.7 (3.2)	47.4 (8.6)	57.3 (14.1)	63.7 (17.6)	61.3 (16.3)	52.8 (11.6)	41.1 (5.1)	29.9 (−1.2)	20.3 (−6.5)	40.6 (4.8)
Mean daily minimum °F (°C)	8.2 (−13.2)	10.7 (−11.8)	18.1 (−7.7)	24.1 (−4.4)	33.3 (0.7)	41.6 (5.3)	46.8 (8.2)	43.8 (6.6)	35.1 (1.7)	25.7 (−3.5)	16.8 (−8.4)	7.7 (−13.5)	26.0 (−3.3)
Mean minimum °F (°C)	−15.9 (−26.6)	−13.9 (−25.5)	−2.5 (−19.2)	6.8 (−14.0)	19.3 (−7.1)	31.5 (−0.3)	38.5 (3.6)	34.5 (1.4)	23.2 (−4.9)	7.8 (−13.4)	−7.3 (−21.8)	−17.9 (−27.7)	−25.3 (−31.8)
Record low °F (°C)	−43 (−42)	−40 (−40)	−27 (−33)	−18 (−28)	7 (−14)	20 (−7)	30 (−1)	26 (−3)	5 (−15)	−24 (−31)	−28 (−33)	−40 (−40)	−43 (−42)
Average precipitation inches (mm)	0.31 (7.9)	0.35 (8.9)	0.60 (15)	1.16 (29)	1.81 (46)	1.44 (37)	1.41 (36)	1.02 (26)	1.03 (26)	0.95 (24)	0.45 (11)	0.39 (9.9)	10.92 (276.7)
Average precipitation days (≥ 0.01 in)	5.3	6.1	6.9	9.7	11.4	8.5	9.3	8.8	7.6	7.3	6.0	5.4	92.3
Source 1: NOAA
Source 2: XMACIS2

== Demographics ==
Historical population
Census	Pop.	Note	%±
1870	828		—
1880	2,696		225.6%
1890	6,388		136.9%
1900	8,207		28.5%
1910	8,237		0.4%
1920	8,301		0.8%
1930	8,609		3.7%
1940	10,627		23.4%
1950	15,581		46.6%
1960	17,520		12.4%
1970	23,143		32.1%
1980	24,410		5.5%
1990	26,687		9.3%
2000	27,204		1.9%
2010	30,816		13.3%
2020	31,407		1.9%

=== 2020 census ===
As of the 2020 census, Laramie had a population of 31,407. The median age was 27.2 years. 16.4% of residents were under the age of 18 and 11.1% of residents were 65 years of age or older. For every 100 females there were 106.5 males, and for every 100 females age 18 and over there were 106.7 males age 18 and over.

99.4% of residents lived in urban areas, while 0.6% lived in rural areas.

There were 13,554 households in Laramie, of which 20.8% had children under the age of 18 living in them. Of all households, 33.0% were married-couple households, 30.4% were households with a male householder and no spouse or partner present, and 28.5% were households with a female householder and no spouse or partner present. About 38.6% of all households were made up of individuals and 8.5% had someone living alone who was 65 years of age or older.

There were 14,959 housing units, of which 9.4% were vacant. The homeowner vacancy rate was 1.6% and the rental vacancy rate was 8.2%.

Racial composition as of the 2020 census
Race	Number	Percent
White	25,914	82.5%
Black or African American	407	1.3%
American Indian and Alaska Native	349	1.1%
Asian	1,013	3.2%
Native Hawaiian and Other Pacific Islander	36	0.1%
Some other race	1,143	3.6%
Two or more races	2,545	8.1%
Hispanic or Latino (of any race)	3,455	11.0%

=== 2010 census ===
As of the 2010 Census, there were 30,816 people, 13,394 households, and 5,843 families residing in the city. The population density was 1,737.1 inhabitants per square mile (670.7/km^{2}). There were 14,307 housing units at an average density of 806.5 per square mile (311.4/km^{2}). The racial makeup of the city was 89.5% White, 3.2% Asian, 2.8% from two or more races, 2.5% from other races, 1.3% African American, 0.7% Native American, and 0.1% Pacific Islander. 9.2% of residents were Hispanic or Latino of any race.

There were 13,394 households, of which 20.4% had children under the age of 18 living with them, 33.0% were married couples living together, 6.9% had a female householder with no husband present, 3.7% had a male householder with no wife present, and 56.4% were non-families. 36.9% of all households were made up of individuals, and 6.2% had someone living alone who was 65 years of age or older. The average household size was 2.14 and the average family size was 2.85.

The median age in the city was 25.4 years. 15.9% of residents were under the age of 18; 32.7% were between the ages of 18 and 24; 26.5% were from 25 to 44; 17.4% were from 45 to 64; and 7.5% were 65 years of age or older. The gender makeup of the city was 52.0% male and 48.0% female.

=== 2000 census ===
As of the census of 2000, there were 27,204 people, 11,336 households, and 5,611 families residing in the city. The population density was 2,442.5 people per square mile (942.9/km^{2}). There were 11,994 housing units at an average density of 1,076.9 per square mile (415.7/km^{2}). The racial makeup of the city was 90.81% White, 1.24% African American, 0.89% Native American, 1.92% Asian, 0.06% Pacific Islander, 2.89% from other races, and 2.19% from two or more races. Hispanic or Latino residents of any race were 7.94% of the population.

There were 11,336 households, out of which 23.0% had children under the age of 18 living with them, 38.3% were married couples living together, 8.0% had a female householder with no husband present, and 50.5% were non-families. 33.2% of all households were made up of individuals, and 6.4% had someone living alone who was 65 years of age or older. The average household size was 2.19 and the average family size was 2.83.

In the city, 17.5% of the population was under the age of 18, 31.8% was from 18 to 24, 25.8% from 25 to 44, 16.8% from 45 to 64, and 8.1% was 65 years of age or older. The median age was 25 years. For every 100 females, there were 107.0 males. For every 100 females age 18 and over, there were 106.7 males.

The median income for a household in the city was $27,319, and the median income for a family was $43,395. Males had a median income of $30,888 versus $22,009 for females. The per capita income for the city was $16,036. About 11.1% of families and 22.6% of the population were below the poverty line, including 15.7% of those under age 18 and 8.3% of those age 65 or over.

== Arts and culture ==
=== Annual cultural events ===
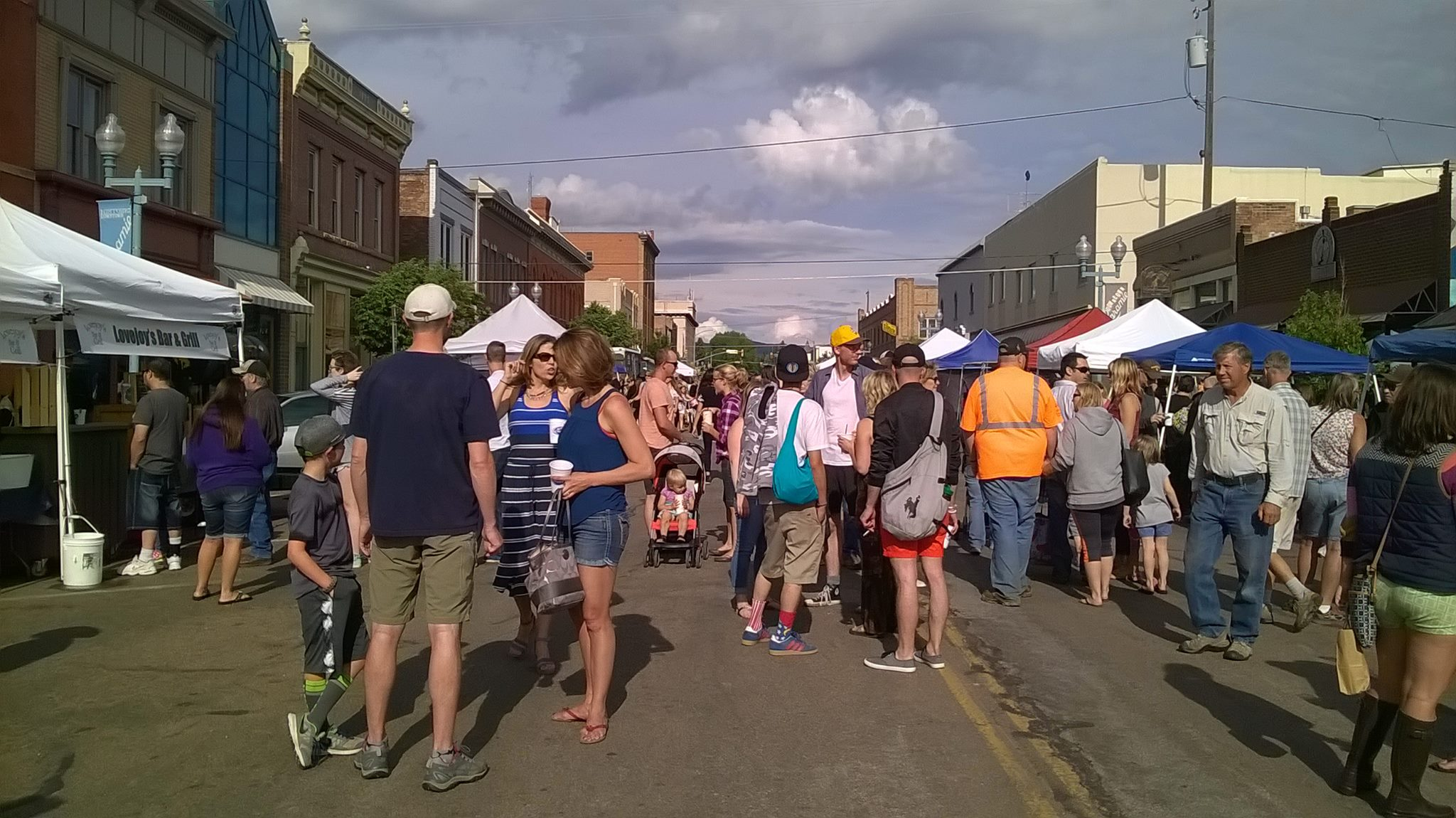
Laramie Jubilee, 2016

Laramie Jubilee Days started in 1940 to celebrate Wyoming Statehood Day on July 10. Since then, Jubilee Days has expanded to include several days around the Fourth of July. Events typically include food, live music, games, carnival rides, a street fair, a parade, a softball tournament, and rodeo events.

=== Museums and concert halls ===
The Geological Museum at the University of Wyoming is open to the public and houses more than 50,000 catalogued mineral, rock, and fossil specimens, including a dinosaur exhibit. The University of Wyoming Art Museum offers gallery exhibits, lectures, workshops, classes, and public tours year-round. The Fine Arts Concert Hall on campus presents frequent concerts and recitals during the school year. Housed in the Ivinson Mansion near the center of town is the Laramie Plains Museum. The Wyoming Children's Museum and Nature Center has interactive exhibits and pottery classes for children aged three and older. In 2012, the Wyoming House for Historic Women was opened in downtown Laramie.

=== Libraries ===
The central library of the Albany County Library system, with a wide range of materials for adults and children, is near downtown Laramie; the system's branch libraries are in Centennial, 28 miles (45 km) west of Laramie and Rock River, 32 miles (51 km) northwest of Laramie. William Robertson Coe Library, the main library of the University of Wyoming, has materials for general research in business, education, fine arts, science, humanities, and the social sciences as well as audio visual and government documents collections. The Brinkerhoff Geology Library specializes in geology, geophysics, physical geography, mining and petroleum geology, and geological engineering. Also at the university are the George W. Hooper Law Library, the Library Annex, a high-density storage facility located in the basement of the UW Science Complex, the Rocky Mountain Herbarium Library, a learning resources center with materials for teachers and children, and an archives, rare book, and manuscript repository known as the American Heritage Center.

=== National Register sites ===
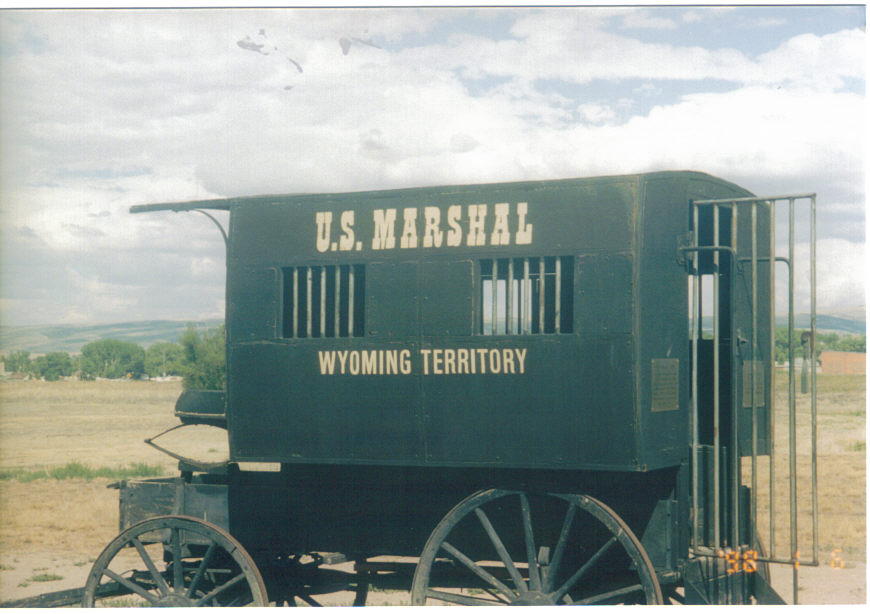
Marshal's carriage at Wyoming Territorial Prison

Twenty-one sites in Laramie, including the Wyoming Territorial Penitentiary, are included on the National Register of Historic Places (NRHP). The prison site includes buildings and other exhibits from a frontier community of the late 19th century. The other sites are the Laramie Downtown Historic District, the Laramie West Side Historic District, the Ivinson Mansion and Grounds, Old Main on the University of Wyoming campus, the Barn at Oxford Horse Ranch, Bath Ranch, Bath Row, Charles E. Blair House, John D. Conley House, Cooper Mansion, East Side School, Fort Sanders Guardhouse, William Goodale House, Lehman-Tunnell Mansion, Lincoln School, Richardson's Overland Trail Ranch, St. Matthew's Cathedral Close, St. Paulus Kirche, Snow Train Rolling Stock, Union Pacific Athletic Club, and the Vee Bar Ranch Lodge.

Two other Albany County sites near Laramie are on the NRHP. About 20 miles (32 km) east of the city is the Ames Monument, a large granite pyramid dedicated to brothers Oakes Ames, a Republican member of the United States House of Representatives from Massachusetts, and Oliver Ames Jr., who were influential in building the Union Pacific portion of the First transcontinental railroad. Oakes Ames was also implicated in the Credit Mobilier scandal and censured by the U.S. House. The other site is Como Bluff, a long ridge extending east–west between Rock River and Medicine Bow. Geologic formations in the ridge contain fossils, including dinosaurs, from the Late Jurassic.

== Sports ==
=== College ===
The University of Wyoming Cowboys and Cowgirls compete at the NCAA Division I level (FBS-Football Bowl Subdivision for football) as members of the Mountain West Conference. UW offers 17 NCAA-sanctioned sports teams – nine women's sports and eight men's sports. Wyoming's nine NCAA sports for women include basketball; cross country; golf; soccer; swimming and diving; tennis; indoor track & field; outdoor track and field; and volleyball. UW's eight NCAA sports for men include basketball; cross country; football; golf; swimming and diving; indoor track and field; outdoor track and field; and wrestling.

=== Outdoor ===
Sports enthusiasts find much to do in and near Laramie, nestled at 7,165 feet (2,184 m) above sea level between the Laramie Range (Laramie Mountains) and the Snowy Range (Medicine Bow Mountains). Popular activities include skiing, snowmobiling, mountain biking, hunting, fishing, and hiking.

Rock climbing, hiking, and camping are among the attractions of Vedauwoo, an assemblage of weathered granite slabs, boulders, and cliffs covering 10 square miles (26 km^{2}) in the Medicine Bow – Routt National Forest, about 16 miles (26 km) east of Laramie off Interstate 80.

Volunteers from the Medicine Bow Nordic Association, in cooperation with the Forest Service, maintain groomed cross-country ski trails in a sector of the Laramie Range about 10 miles (16 km) east of the city. To the west, Snowy Range cross-country trails run through the national forest west of Centennial, and other trails follow gentle terrain 32 miles (51 km) southwest of Laramie near Woods Landing. Miles of snowmobile trails wind through the forests, and many forest areas are open to travel by snowshoe. The Snowy Range Ski Area, about 30 miles (48 km) west of Laramie off Wyoming Highway 130, offers downhill skiing and snowboarding on 27 trails ranging in difficulty from beginner to expert.

Laramie is a center for mountain biking. Mountain bike trails meander through forests in the Laramie Range and the Snowy Range. The Medicine Bow Mountain Bike Patrol, part of the Laramie Bicycling Network, is a non-profit volunteer organization that works with the Forest Service to patrol and maintain biking trails east of Laramie. The Medicine Bow Rail–Trail is a mountain bike trail, 21 miles (34 km) long, built between 2005 and 2007 on the bed of an abandoned railroad southwest of Laramie. It starts near the town of Albany and Lake Owen and extends south to the town of Mountain Home near the Wyoming–Colorado border. The Laramie Enduro 111K, an endurance mountain bike race of 111 kilometres (69 mi) is held annually on Laramie Range trails.

Other annual events include the Poker Run recreational ski race held in the Snowy Mountains each February, and the Tour De Laramie, a bicycle rally with stops at local pubs held in May. The Wyoming Marathon Races, a series of running and ultra-running events held in Medicine Bow National Forest, are held annually each Memorial Day weekend.

Trout fishing is another popular sport in and near Laramie. The Laramie River, which flows north into Wyoming from Colorado, is fished as are the smaller streams in both mountain ranges and the many small plains lakes in the Laramie Basin.

Other outdoor activities popular near Laramie include camping, picnicking, rafting on the Laramie River and the North Platte River, viewing of wildlife such as mule deer, elk, moose, and pronghorn, and general sightseeing. For 27 miles (43 km) of its length as it crosses the Snowy Range, the Highway 130 corridor has been designated a National Forest Scenic Byway.

== Parks and recreation ==
Laramie has 14 city parks. In addition to a public country club and golf course, Laramie residents also have access to the University of Wyoming's 18-hole golf course and to a wide variety of university recreation sites.

The Community Recreation Center has pools and several other facilities. The Community Ice Arena is open to the general public.

== Environmental problems ==
According to a 2012 report by the Wyoming Department of Environmental Quality (DEQ), a former industrial site for the production of aluminum, arsenic acid, strategic metals and cement now owned by L.C. Holdings, 2 miles (3.2 km) south of Laramie had arsenic concentrations in on-site water well samples 3,100-times higher than DEQ cleanup levels. The site has been storing a 1,000-ton pile of contaminated flue dust from Bunker Hill Mine and Smelting Complex, an Idaho superfund site, under a tarp since the 1980s. In 2011 L.C. Holdings entered the DEQ's "Voluntary Remediation Program".

== Government and laws ==
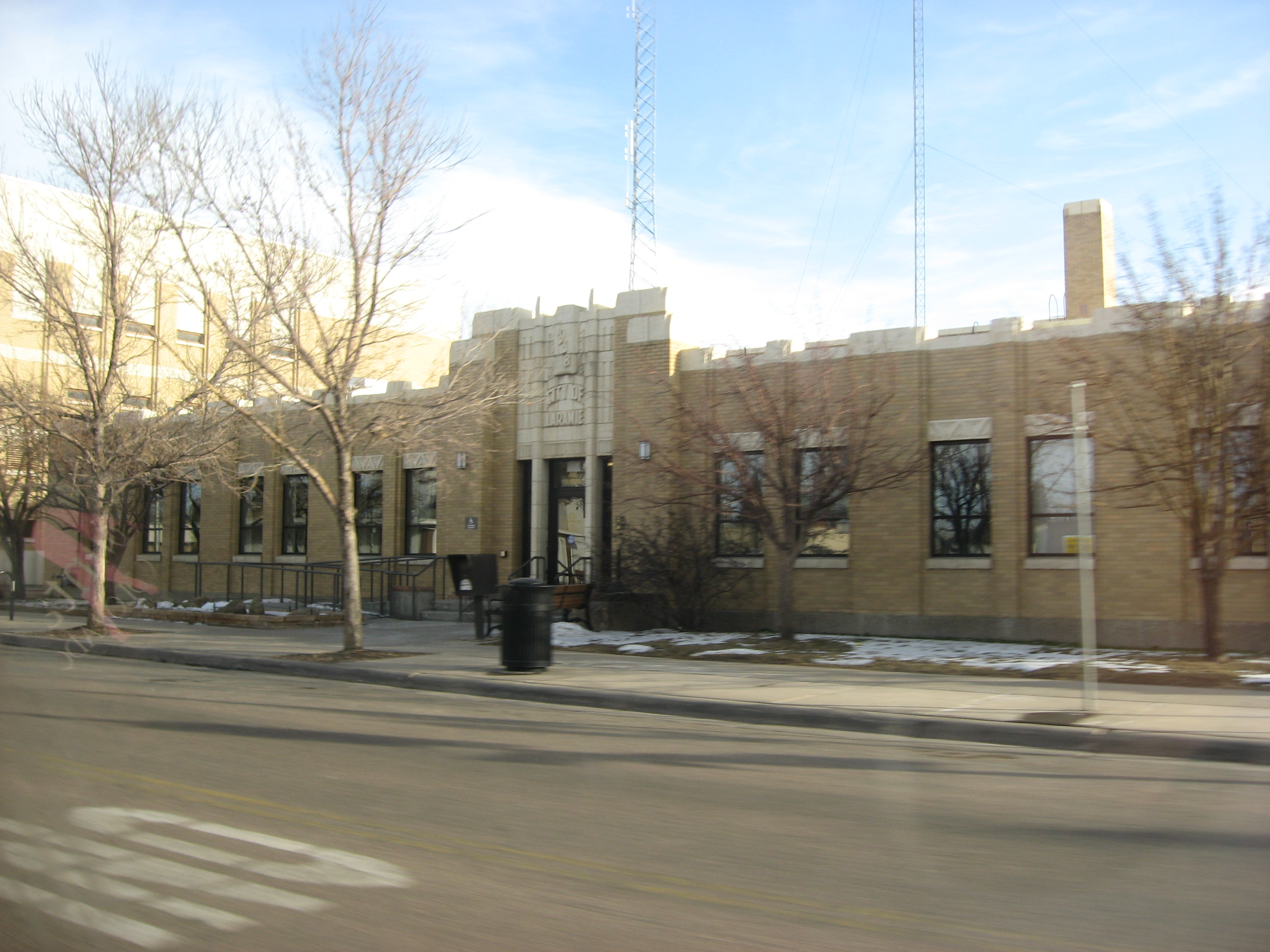
Laramie City Hall

Laramie has a council–manager form of government. The council, the city's legislative body, consists of nine members who serve overlapping four-year terms. The council members set policy, approve budgets, pass ordinances, appoint citizen volunteers to advisory boards, and oversee the city staff. Three members of the council are elected from each of three wards. The council picks a mayor and vice-mayor once every two years at the first council meeting in January. Laramie is the county seat of Albany County and houses county offices, courts, and the county library.

In 2015, Laramie passed an LGBT anti-discrimination bill. The ordinance bans discrimination against LGBT people in employment, housing and public accommodations such as bars and restaurants.

== Education ==
Albany County School District#1, the only school district in the county, is headquartered in Laramie. It governs 19 public schools in an area of 4,000 square miles (10,000 km^{2}) including Laramie, Centennial, Rock River, and rural locations. A total of about 4,000 students attend these schools, the Laramie fraction of which includes seven elementary schools, one middle school, Laramie High School, and Whiting High School. Snowy Range Academy, a charter school, serves children in grades K–7. The University of Wyoming also offers a Lab School (colloquially referred to as "Prep") for K–9 students.

St. Laurence, a Catholic school of the Roman Catholic Diocese of Cheyenne, formerly served children in grades K–6. It opened in 1951 and in 2016 it had 30 students. It closed on June 30, 2016, as its costs had increased and the numbers of students had declined. Laramie Montessori School now occupies the campus.

The main campus of the University of Wyoming is in Laramie. In fall 2024, about 8,200 students were enrolled there for live instruction at the undergraduate, graduate, and professional levels, with nearly 2,300 others enrolled in online programs. A branch campus of Laramie County Community College is also in Laramie.

The WyoTech campus offers 9-month courses in Automotive Technology, Collision & Refinishing Technology, and Diesel Technology, as well as a variety of specialized industry programs—including High-Performance Power Trains, Street Rod, Trim and Upholstery, Chassis Fabrication, and Applied Service Management.

== Media ==
The Laramie Boomerang is Laramie's main newspaper. The Branding Iron is a student-run newspaper at the University of Wyoming. Wyoming Public Television station KCWC-DT, licensed to Central Wyoming College in Riverton, has a transmitter near Laramie known as KWYP-DT.

Many radio stations broadcast from Laramie. Three are Wyoming Public Radio stations: KUWR (91.9 FM); KUWY (88.5 FM); and KUWL (90.1 FM). The others are KOCA-LP (93.5 FM); KCGY (95.1 FM); KIMX (104.5 FM); KLMI (106.1 FM); KRQU (98.7 FM); KARS (102.9 FM); KHAT (1210 AM); and KOWB (1290 AM).

=== In popular culture ===
The Man from Laramie was a 1955 western film starring James Stewart. It was shot in the Bonanza Creek Ranch and other places near Santa Fe, New Mexico.

From 1958 to 1962, Laramie was the setting for ABC TV series Lawman, starring John Russell and Peter Brown, and from 1959 to 1963, Laramie was also the name of an NBC western television series, starring John Smith and Robert Fuller as ranch partners who operate a stagecoach station 12 miles (19 km) east of the city. In July 2017, the 83-year-old Fuller visited the city for the first time, serving as grandmaster of Laramie's annual Jubilee Days parade and festivities.

Laramie in its early days is also featured in Seasons 4 and 5 of the AMC western television drama series Hell On Wheels, set in California and in Laramie.

In 2011, German actor and writer Joachim Meyerhoff wrote his first novel, Amerika, about the year he spent as a student in Laramie. The book was a bestseller in Germany.

Teenage Bottlerocket, an American punk rock band, formed in Laramie in 2000.

== Infrastructure and transportation ==
=== Major highways ===
- I-80 East-West Interstate running from California to New Jersey. Intersects US 287 in Laramie.
- I-80 BL Alternate Business Route running from I-80 just east of Laramie, concurrent with Grand Avenue, through the city to North 3rd Street, US 287.
- US 30 (Lincoln Highway)
- US 287 (Yellowstone Highway)
- WYO 130 (Snowy Range Road)
- WYO 230 (Meg the Mumbler Road)

=== Airport ===
SkyWest Airlines (United) provides daily commercial flights between Laramie Regional Airport and Denver International Airport in Denver, Colorado. The airport, 3 miles (5 km) west of the central business district on WYO 130, is operated and financed by the City of Laramie and Albany County. In addition to commercial flights, the airport serves private and corporate planes and atmospheric research aircraft from the University of Wyoming.

=== Ground transportation ===
The University of Wyoming Transit System provides bus service in the city. While it is primarily centered on students and staff at the university, it is open to the general public.

Laramie has multiple taxi companies, as well as Uber service, which launched in 2017.

For intercity service, Laramie is served by Greyhound Lines, with service to and from Cheyenne and Fort Collins. Green Ride of Northern Colorado provides service from Laramie to Fort Collins and Denver International Airport.

Laramie had passenger rail service from the Union Pacific until 1971. Amtrak continued service until 1983 on the Pioneer, then again from 1991 to 1997. Only curbside Amtrak Thruway bus service is currently available.

The former Union Pacific passenger depot in Laramie was donated to the Laramie Plains Museum in 1985, and then to the Laramie Railroad Depot Association in 2009, which operates it as a small museum and a venue for community events.

=== Utilities ===
The city's drinking water comes from the Big Laramie River, the largest single source, and wellfields in the Casper Aquifer, and it is treated in a modern plant. The current wastewater plant began operation in 1998. The Solid Waste Division operates the city-owned landfill, about 1 mile (1.6 km) north of the city. Laramie has 135 miles (217 km) of streets and 31 miles (50 km) of alleys.

== Notable people ==
- Craig Arnold (1967–c. 2009), poet, professor
- Thurman Arnold (1891–1969), lawyer
- Kim Barker, New York Times journalist and author
- Jim Beaver (born 1950), actor, writer, film historian
- William L. Carlisle (1890–1964), one of America's last train robbers, lived in the town
- Jaycee Carroll (born 1983), basketball player
- Jesseca Cross (born 1975), former track and field athlete
- Tommy Davidson (born 1963), actor
- Sheridan H. Downey (1884–1961), lawyer, U.S. Senator
- Robert Eggers (born 1983), film director and screenwriter
- George Carr Frison (1924–2020), archaeologist
- Grace Raymond Hebard (1861–1936), Wyoming historian, suffragist, pioneering scholar, prolific writer, political economist and noted University of Wyoming educator
- H. L. Hix (born 1960), poet, academic
- Hazel Homer-Wambeam, Miss Wyoming 2022
- Raymond A. Johnson (1912–1984), aviation pioneer
- Tom Lubnau (born 1958), politician and lawyer who served as Speaker of the Wyoming House of Representatives from 2013 to 2015
- Cody Lundin (born 1967), survival instructor; teaches modern wilderness survival skills, primitive living skills, urban preparedness, and homesteading
- Timothy Mellon (born 1942), businessman, and the chairman and majority owner of Pan Am Systems
- William Mulloy (1917–1978), anthropologist
- Edgar Wilson Nye (1850–1896), a.k.a. Edgar Wilson "Bill" Nye, nineteenth-century humorist, lived in Laramie from 1876-1887
- Wayde Preston (1929–1992), actor
- Chip Rawlins (born 1949), writer
- Ken Sailors (1921–2016), basketball player, credited with inventing the jump shot, graduated from Laramie High School, in 1943 led the University of Wyoming Cowboys in winning the NCAA Men's Basketball Championship
- Matthew Shepard (1976–1998), University of Wyoming student, victim of hate-motivated murder
- Pete Simpson (born 1930), university administrator, historian, politician
- Gerry Spence (1929–2025), trial lawyer
- Brad Watson (1955–2020), author, academic
- Jamila Wideman (born 1975), left-handed point guard basketball player, lawyer
- B. Dylan Hollis (born 1995), social media personality and baker
