= Laramie Plains Civic Center =

- East Side School
- U.S. National Register of Historic Places
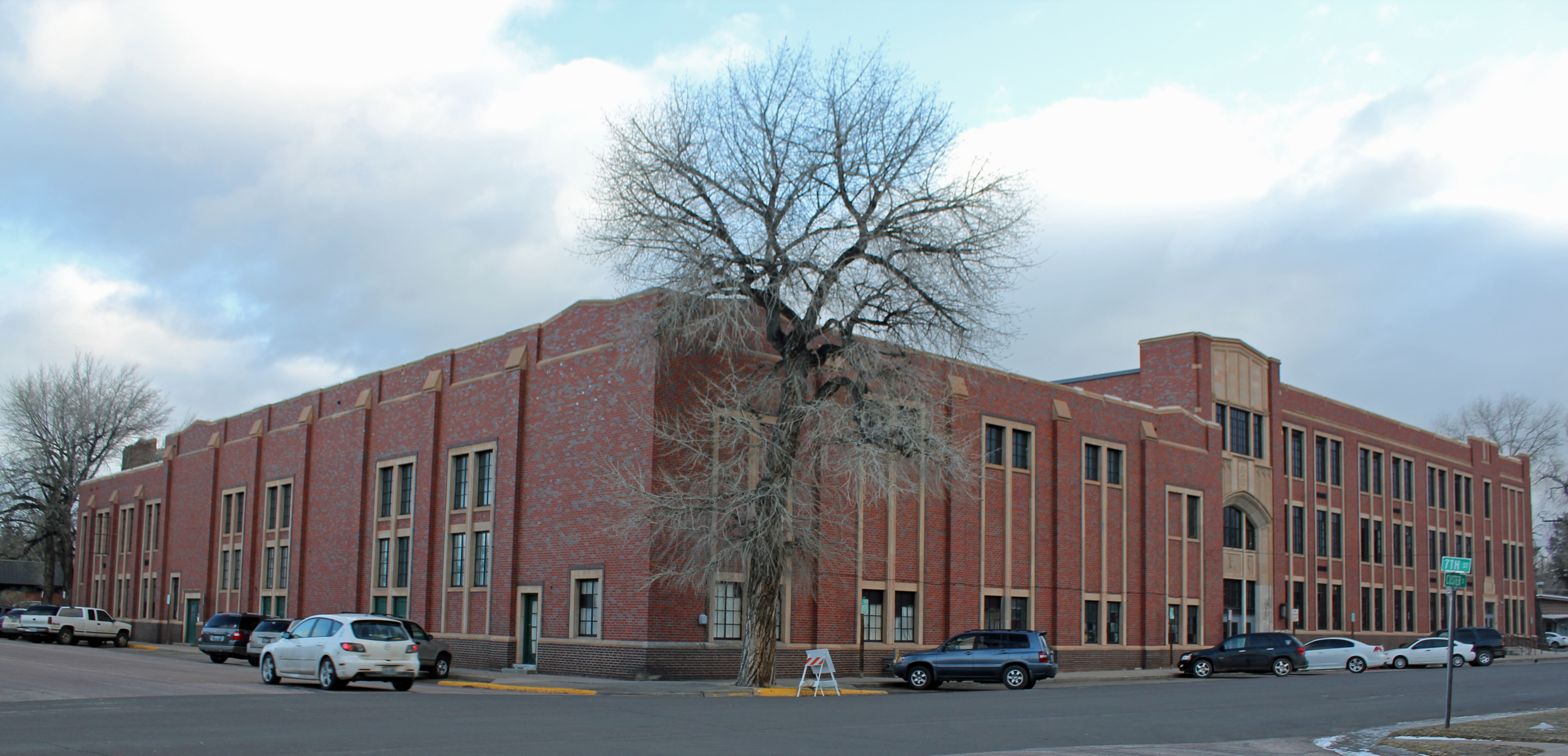
- Laramie Plains Civic Center in 2014

- Location within Wyoming Location within the United States
- Location: 710 East Garfield St., Laramie, Wyoming
- Coordinates: 41°18′33.4″N 105°35′16.3″W
- Area: less than one acre
- Built: 1878
- Architect: Peter Hanson
- Architectural style: Gothic
- NRHP reference No.: 81000610
- Added to NRHP: March 17, 1981

== Overview ==
The Laramie Plains Civic Center, established in 1982, is a community center located in Laramie, Wyoming. The Civic Center provides performance, studio, and gallery space for visual and performing arts. The center also contains offices and small business space.

== Description ==
The center is housed in the historic former East Side School building. The original schoolhouse was constructed in 1878 as the first school building in the newly established town of Laramie in Wyoming.

The earliest portion of the building was characterized by an Italianate brick design with four classrooms on the main floor and two upstairs. In response to growing enrollment and educational needs, the school underwent two major additions in 1928 and in 1939.

The 1928 expansion, designed by architect Wilbur Hitchcock, introduced additional classrooms, a gymnasium, and a large auditorium. This addition was constructed in a simplified Gothic style, notable for its pointed arch accents. The auditorium was distinguished by a series of large, oil-on-canvas murals painted by Florence Ware, depicting scenes from Wyoming history which remain a significant artistic feature of the building.

The 1939 addition enlarged the structure further, enclosing the original 1878 building within both expansions. This addition incorporating architectural elements that resembled earlier Italianate and Gothic features. With the final addition the school filled the entire city block it occupies.

The East Side School was placed on the National Register of Historic Places on March 17, 1981, as part of its transition to its current role as a civic center.

== History ==
=== East Side School (1878–1960) ===
Construction of the original school building began in 1878, four years after the incorporation of the town of Laramie. Newspaper records from the late nineteenth and early twentieth centuries document debates surrounding school funding, facilities, and the changing role of the building in the community.

By the early twentieth century, the building served both elementary and secondary education. Newspaper accounts from 1910 indicate that the structure, originally designed for elementary education, lacked sufficient facilities for high school use, contributing to calls for expansion.

A major expansion occurred in 1929, followed by another in 1938, reflecting greater enrollment and educational requirements. During this period, the building served variously as a high school, junior high school, and as a combined facility, housing both junior high and high school grades within the same building, until a new high school was constructed elsewhere in Laramie.

=== Junior high and transition period (1960–1982) ===
After 1960, the building primarily functioned as a junior high school, and the facility entered a transitional period beginning in 1978 after the junior high school finally closed. During this time, the future of the building was reconsidered amid broader discussions about preservation and community use.

=== Community Center (1982–present) ===
In 1982, the building was repurposed as the Laramie Plains Civic Center. The adaptive reuse of the building preserved its historic structure while establishing a permanent home for arts and culture in Laramie. Since its founding, the Civic Center has hosted performances, exhibitions, classes, and community events. Today, it remains an active communal institution in Laramie.

== Significance ==
The Laramie Plains Civic Center is significant for its role in Laramie’s educational history and for its continued use as the center. The building represents more than a century of public service from a schoolhouse to a modern arts center while maintaining its status as a community space.
