= Bath Ranch =

- U.S. National Register of Historic Places
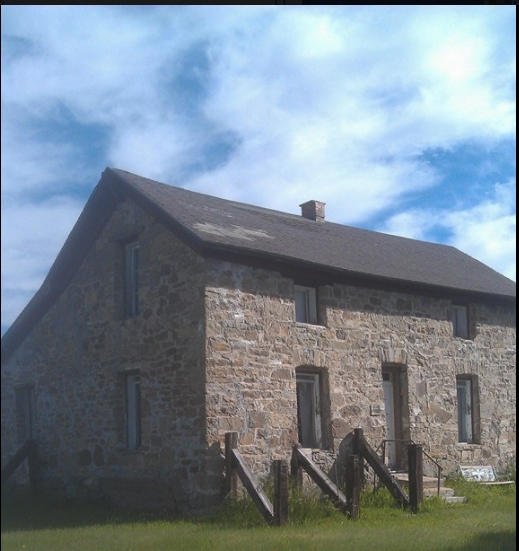

- Location within Wyoming Location within the United States
- Nearest city: Laramie, Wyoming
- Coordinates: 41°23′43″N 105°49′34″W
- Area: less than one acre
- Built: 1875
- Architect: Bath, Henry
- NRHP reference No.: 85003211
- Added to NRHP: December 13, 1985

The Bath Ranch, also known as the Bath Brothers Ranch and the Stone Ranch, was established near Laramie, Wyoming by Henry Bath about 1869-70. It was one of the first ranches in Albany County. The initial homestead was replaced by the present stone house and barn in 1875, using stone quarried locally by Henry and his sons. Since the area was populated by hostile Native Americans, the buildings were designed as fortified refuges. The Bath family became prominent in Wyoming society in subsequent years.

== Description ==
The house and barn are built of massive stone, with walls 18 inches (46 cm) thick. The house is 1-1/2 stories. A kitchen and a dining room are location in the back under a shed-roofed extension, with public rooms in front and bedrooms upstairs. The front wall is built up to 1-1/2 stories with low windows lighting the upstairs rooms.

The barn is also 1-1/2 stories, with a gambrel roof. The stone walls only extend to the floor of the loft, with frame construction above.

The Bath Ranch was placed on the National Register of Historic Places on December 13, 1985.

The City of Laramie's purchase of the Bath Ranch in 2022, also known as the Hart Ranch, was a strategic move to secure the city's water future. The acquisition was part of a cross-contingent purchase agreement with The Conservation Fund, which is focused on preserving wildlife habitat. The Bath Ranch, which includes 4,600.74 acres, was purchased for $7,583,400, with municipal bonds financing $7 million and the remaining $583,400 to be paid by the municipal water system. The city's primary interest in the property is the water rights, but it will also manage the land for open space, recreation, and other public purposes in the future. The conservation fund's interest is primarily for the preservation of wildlife habitat. The Bath Ranch is home to a variety of species and is located adjacent to the Hutton Lake National Refuge, making it a significant area for conservation efforts.
