= St. Paul's United Church of Christ of Laramie =

Historic church in Wyoming, United States

- St. Paulus Kirche
- U.S. National Register of Historic Places
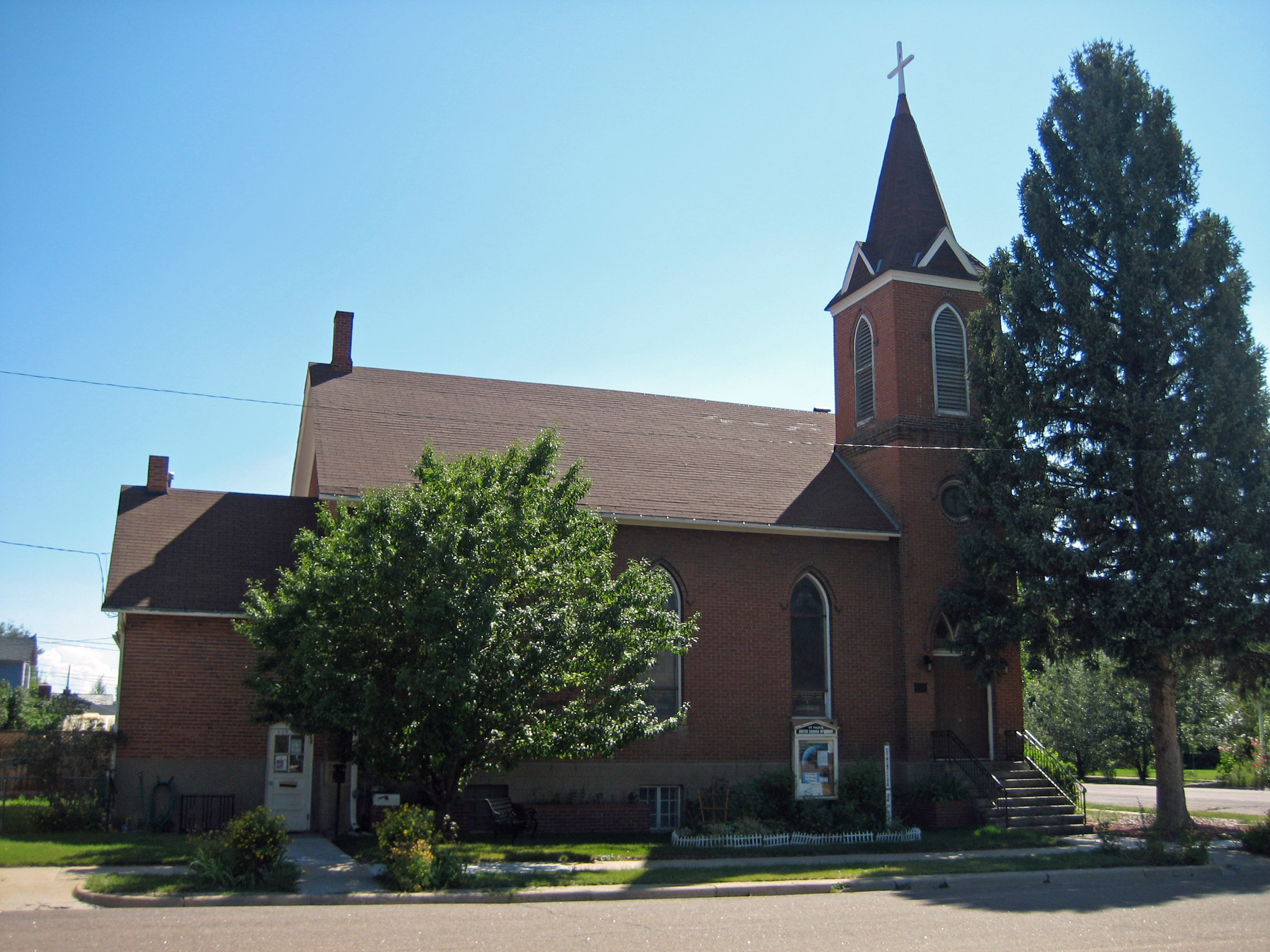
- St. Paul's today, as seen from the north. The main structure was built in 1890–91 while the eastern section was added in 1922.

- Location within Wyoming Location within the United States
- Location: 602 Garfield, Laramie, Wyoming
- Coordinates: 41°18′35″N 105°35′20″W
- Area: 0.2 acres (0.081 ha)
- Built: 1890
- Architect: Berner, George
- NRHP reference No.: 83004266
- Added to NRHP: November 25, 1983

St. Paul's United Church of Christ of Laramie was founded in 1886 as the first German language congregation in Wyoming. The church building was listed on the National Register of Historic Places in 1983. The cornerstone was laid on July 13, 1890, three days after statehood. Clergy from Chicago and the local Christian, Methodist, Episcopal, Presbyterian and Baptist Churches participated in the ceremony, with an address by Dr. John Wesley Hoyt, former Governor of Wyoming Territory and at the time first president of the University of Wyoming. The building was completed and dedicated on January 18, 1891. It is the oldest church structure in Laramie continuously used by the same congregation. With its stained glass windows and heavy wooden furnishings, St. Paul's is reminiscent of rural German churches. Those elaborate windows and its many simplified Gothic elements make the building unique among Lutheran churches in Wyoming.

The church's several name changes reflect its history. The original name for the congregation (which spoke and worshiped in German) was Deutsche Evangelische Lutherische St. Paulus Gemeinde. The original church building name was St. Paulus Kirche. The congregation joined the Evangelical Synod of North America in 1904 after incorporating the year before as St. Pauls German Evangelical Church of Laramie, Wyoming. (The original corporate name omitted the apostrophe in "St. Paul's" because German does not use one.) After the Evangelical Synod merged with the Reformed Church in the United States in 1934, St. Pauls changed its name in 1949 to St. Paul's Evangelical and Reformed Church of Laramie, Wyoming. After the Evangelical and Reformed Church merged with the Congregational Christian Churches in 1957 to create the United Church of Christ, the church changed its name in 1963 to St. Paul's United Church of Christ. Since 1974 the church has had its present name, St. Paul's United Church of Christ of Laramie.

During World War I St. Paul's (locally known then as "the German church") and its German-speaking pastor, Rev. O.G. Wichmann, were the targets of anti-German sentiment and murmurings of spying and other disloyal activities. The church's last German language sermon was preached in 1932. In 1976, St. Paul's became the first Laramie church to call an ordained woman as its pastor.
