= Wyoming historical monuments and markers =

Historic Commissions in Wyoming, United States

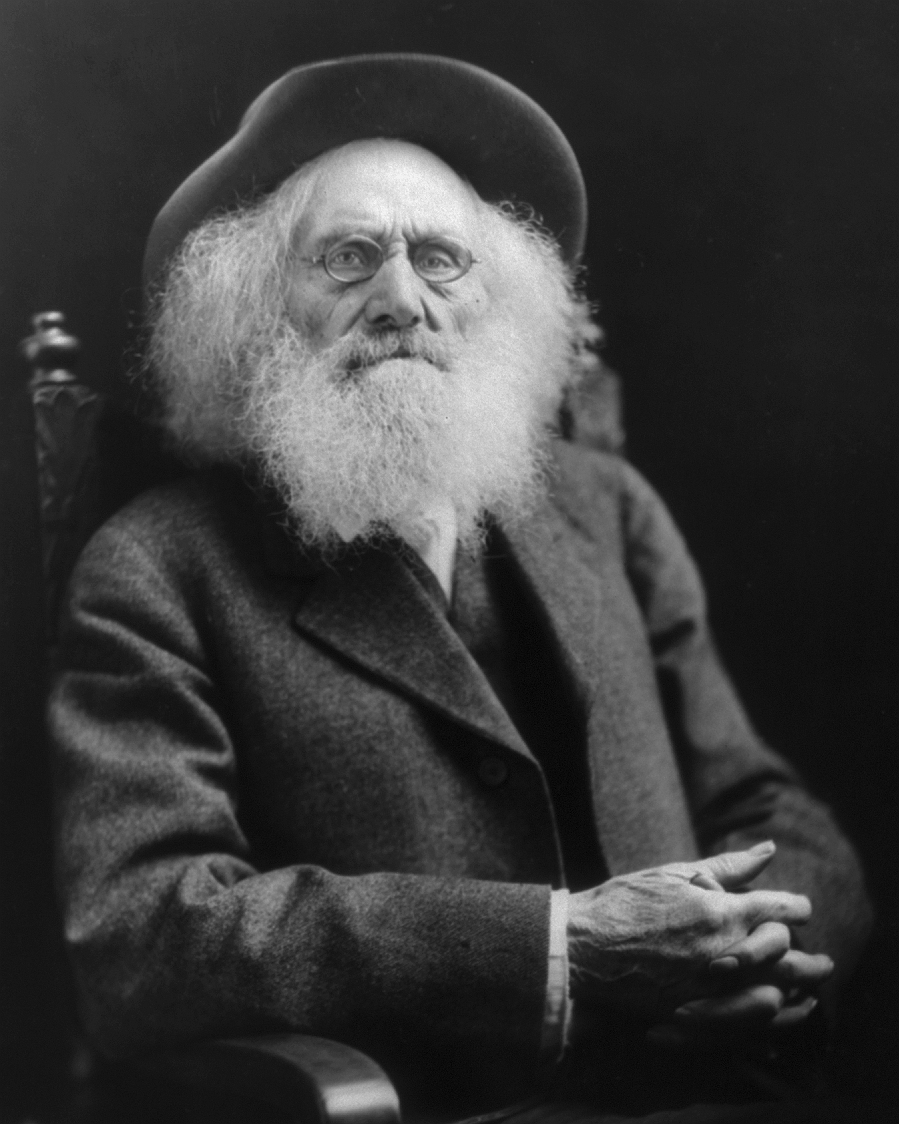
Ezra Meeker in 1921, an American pioneer and founder of the Wyoming historical monuments and markers movement

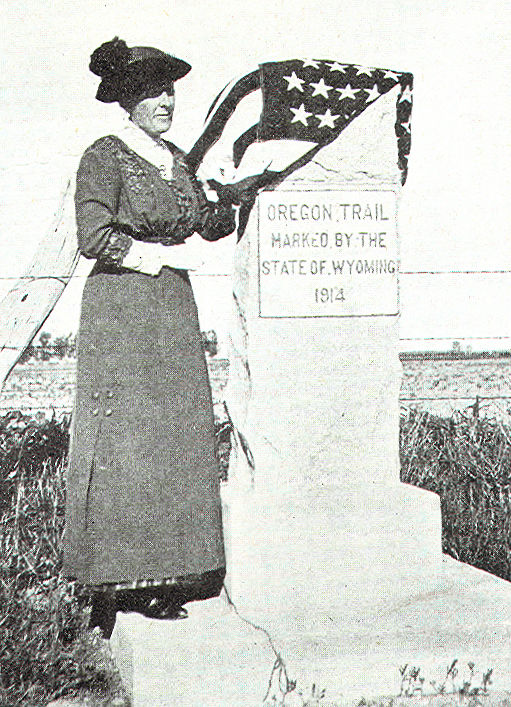
The Wyoming Oregon Trail Commission, in close association with Grace Hebard and Herman Gould Nickerson, placed at least 31 markers throughout Wyoming between 1913–1915

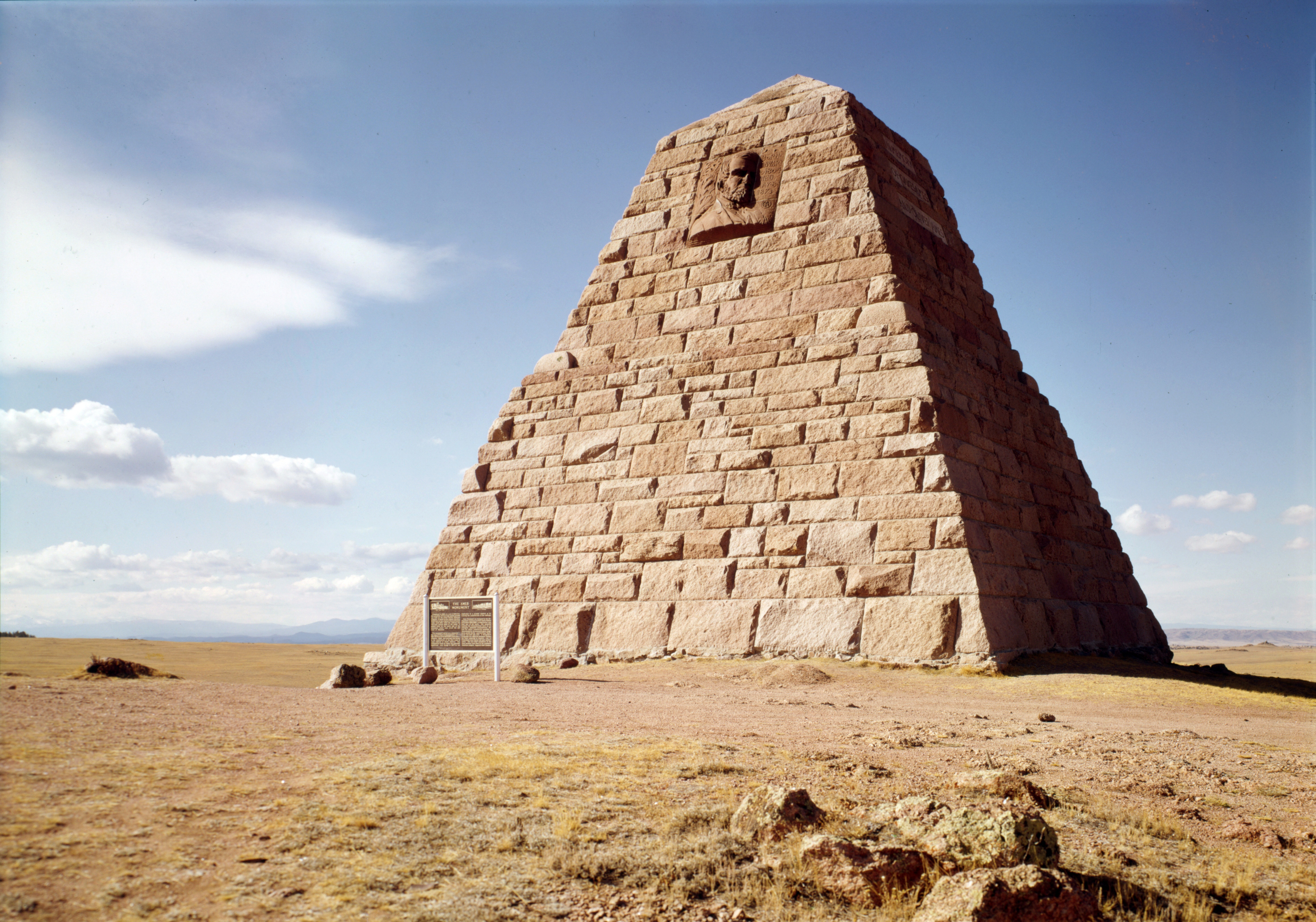
Ames Monument built in 1875

Wyoming historical monuments and markers are markers, signs, statues, monuments, and plaques installed at important historical sites in Wyoming. The historical markers were installed by the State of Wyoming, nonprofit organizations, and private parties. For the state, different departments have participated in the program, including: Wyoming Division of State Parks and Historic Sites, the Wyoming Department of Transportation, and the Wyoming Office of Tourism. The State of Wyoming has one of the oldest sign and marker programs in the United States. The oldest marker is in Albany County and was built in 1875, the Ames Monument, commissioned by the Union Pacific Railroad, in honor of The First transcontinental railroad builders. Many of the Wyoming historical sites later became National Register of Historic Places.

== Ezra Meeker ==
Ezra Meeker (1830-1928) was an American pioneer on the Oregon Trail. Meeker did not want the Oregon Trail to be forgotten, so he built markers and monuments on the trail. He inspired others in Wyoming to build markers and monuments at other historical sites in Wyoming, including Split Rock, Devil's Gate, Independence Rock and the ferry at Cokeville.

== Oregon Trail Memorial Association ==
Ezra Meeker created the Oregon Trail Memorial Association (OTMA) in 1922. The Oregon Trail Memorial Association commemorates the pioneers who traveled the Oregon Trail. Meeker and the Oregon Trail Memorial Association achieved the goal of having the United States Bureau of the Mint coin Oregon Trail Memorial half dollar from 1926 to 1939. The coin helped raise funds to create monuments on the Oregon Trail. In 1940, the Oregon Trail Memorial Association became the American Pioneer Trails Association, which became the Oregon-California Trails Association (OCTA).

== Wyoming Oregon Trail Commission ==
In 1908, the Daughters of the American Revolution and the Oregon Trail Memorial Association started building markers in Wyoming. Daughters of the American Revolution's Grace Raymond Hebard helped build many of the Oregon Trail markers. The Wyoming Oregon Trail Commission was founded in 1913 by an act of the Twelfth Wyoming State Legislature. The Wyoming Oregon Trail Commission legislation was passed due to the work of the Sons of the American Revolution and the Daughters of the American Revolution. The Oregon Trail Commission's first secretary was Mrs. H. B. Patten, she recorded 24 state historical markers in 1914 and 49 by 1916. In 1920, the Oregon Trail Commission's last marker was the Wagon Box Fight. Captain Herman Gould Nickerson (1841-1927), president of the Wyoming Oregon Trail Commission from 1913 to 1921.

== Wyoming Historical Landmark Commission ==
In 1927, the Wyoming Historical Landmark Commission was founded. The Wyoming Historical Landmark Commission was formed to preserve Fort Laramie, which was in a state of decay. The Wyoming Historical Landmark Commission assumed responsibility for creating and preserving historic markers and monuments in Wyoming. The two main sites were acquired for preservation: Fort Bridger and Fort Reno. Midwest Oil Company President Robert Ellison was one of the original members of the Wyoming Historical Landmark Commission and helped acquire Fort Reno. In 1959, the Wyoming Historical Landmark Commission was closed, and its records were transferred to the Wyoming State Archives, Museum, and Historical Department. Wyoming State Historical Society worked with the Wyoming State Archives, Museum and Historical Department. The Wyoming Recreation Commission was created in 1967. In the Wyoming Recreation Commission was a preservation officer. The preservation officer ran the Historic Section of the Recreation Commission. The preservation officer maintains the state monuments and markers throughout the state. In 1985, this was transferred to the Wyoming Archives, Museum and Historical Department. The Wyoming Historical Society has been working with the Historical Landmarks since 1953.

== Gallery ==
Dedication of Independence Rock Marker on July 4, 1920. From Left to right, Mrs. Tom Cooper, Casper regent, D.A.R.; Former Gov. Bryant Butler Brooks; Grace Raymond Hebard, Oregon Trail Commission; Mrs. B.B. Brooks, state regent, D.A.R.; former frontiersman Fin Burnett.

Robert Ellison and the Fort Reno historical marker in 1927. Robert Ellison was the Midwest Oil Company President and was one of the original members of the Wyoming new Historical Landmarks Commission when it was founded in 1927.

Fort Augur-Fort Brown historical marker in 1914. Made and placed by Capt. H. G. Nickerson, president of the Wyoming Oregon Trail Commission from 1913 to 1921. The fort was renamed Fort Washakie in honor of Chief Washakie.

Captain Herman Gould Nickerson (1841-1927), president of the Wyoming Oregon Trail Commission from 1913 to 1921.

Unveiling the Oregon Trait marker near Lingle, Wyoming on June 17. 1915. Hon. Joseph M. Carey speaking. Carey was the 8th Governor of Wyoming.

Ezra Meeker and Captain H.G. Nickerson in 1915, founders of the Wyoming Oregon Trail Commission. Both American pioneers of the Oregon Trail.

== See also ==
- Wyoming Historical Landmarks
- Timeline of Wyoming history
- Albany County, Wyoming monuments and markers
- Carbon County, Wyoming monuments and markers
- List of National Historic Landmarks in Wyoming
- National Register of Historic Places listings in Wyoming
