= Albany County, Wyoming monuments and markers =

Historic places in Wyoming, United States

Location of Albany County in Wyoming

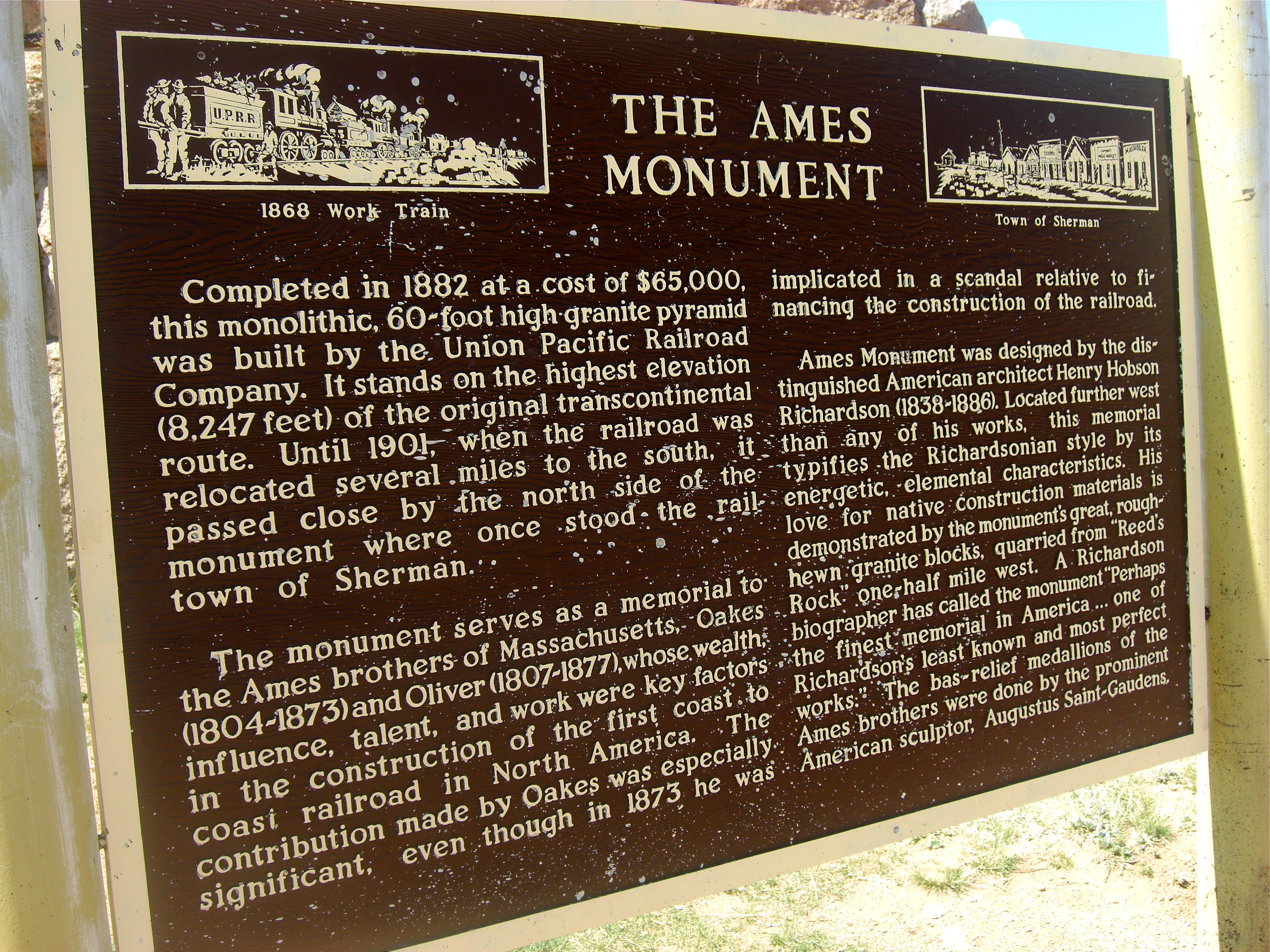
Ames Monument sign

Albany County, Wyoming Monuments and Markers are markers, signs, and plaques installed at important historical sites in Albany County, Wyoming. The historical markers were installed by the State of Wyoming, nonprofit organizations, and private parties. For the state, different departments have participated in the program including: Wyoming Division of State Parks and Historic Sites, the Wyoming Department of Transportation, and Wyoming Office of Tourism. The State of Wyoming has one of the oldest sign and marker programs in the United States. The oldest marker is in Albany County was built in 1875, the Ames Monument.

== Markers ==
Albany County, Wyoming Monuments and Markers
City	Landmark name	location	notes
Buford	Ames Monument	209 Monument Road; 41°7′52″N 105°23′53″W	Commissioned by the Union Pacific Railroad, the First transcontinental railroad marker, National Historic Landmark
Buford	Old Sherman Cemetery	823 Hermosa Road	Used from 1867 to about 1880, The town of Sherman was a Union Pacific station at the highest elevation point of 8,247’ feet.
Buford	Lonetree on the Laramie Range	I-80 center of I-80; 41.1337°N 105.346767°W	Highest point of the railroad's route. Multiple markers at site
Buford	Tree in the Rock	I-80 center of road 41.1337°N 105.3467°W	Tree by the Union Pacific Railroad in 1868.
Buford	Sherman Mountains	I-80 center of road 41.133767°N 105.3467°W	Natural features of the erosion of the Sherman Mountains
Buford	The Gangplank	I-80 service road 41.0988°N 105.1125°W	Natural features of the Gangplank, granite rock pass used by the First transcontinental railroad and now the I-80 also.
Centennial	Centennial Depot	WY 130 in Centennial	Built in 1907, now the Nici Self Historical Museum. Multiple markers at site.
Jelm	Woods Landing Dance Hall	Intersection of Hansen's Road and WY Hwy 1	Scandinavian log Dance Hall, National Register of Historic Places
Laramie	Methodist Episcopal Church	150 N. 2nd Street	Built in 1869, oldest church building in Wyoming.
Laramie	Laramie vigilantes at 407 S. 2nd Street	407 S. 2nd Street	Vigilantes event on October 18, 1868
Laramie	Laramie Train Depot	600 S. 1st Street	Laramie Railroad Depot was built in 1924 to replace the town's original Union Pacific Depot/Hotel that was destroyed by fire in 1917. The depot has a museum and park. Multiple markers at site
Laramie	First Woman Jury	Depot Park 320 S. 1st Street	Site where the first woman jury served in March 1870
Laramie	Abraham Lincoln Memorial Monument	Intersection of I-80 and Highway 210; On I-80 16 miles east of Laramie	Monument commemorates the sesquicentennial of Lincoln's birthday. Multiple markers at site
Laramie	Henry B. Joy Monument	Summit Rest Area, Lincoln Monument	A Lincoln Highway marker about Henry B. Joy
Laramie	Henry Bourne Joy and the Lincoln Highway	Lincoln Monument Rest Stop	A Lincoln Highway marker
Laramie	Gateway to the Rockies	Lincoln Monument; 41.236833°N 105.435817°W	At Lincoln Monument Rest Stop
Laramie	Ranching from the High Point	Lincoln Monument Rest Stop	Marks large sheep and cattle herds from the mid 1800s into the 1900s.
Laramie	Purple Heart Trail	Abraham Lincoln Memorial	The Purple Heart Trail Medal marker
Laramie	Telephone Canyon	Lincoln Monument Rest Stop	The first conversation over this line was held in 1882
Laramie	Bath Ranch	Herrick Lane (Hwy 12) and I-80 41.3953°N 105.8262°W	A National Register of Historic Places, one of the first ranches in Albany County.
Laramie	Bronze Statue of Washakie	1649 Grand Avenue	Bronze sculpture of Chief Washakie at Battle of Crowheart Butte
Laramie	Big Laramie Stage Station	506 Wyoming Highway 230; 11 miles southeast of Laramie	Started in 1849 Overland Trail into Wyoming, historic crossing
Laramie	Old Overland Trail	822 WY-230; 41.2490°N 105.7141°W	Old Overland Trail 1862 - 1868
Laramie	Commemorating Women of Laramie	Wyoming Women's History House, 317 S 2nd Street	Laramie women who served first on a jury in March 1870 and the Suffrage Act of 1869. Multiple markers at site
Laramie	Wyoming Territorial Prison	975 Snowy Range Road	A National Register of Historic Places, multiple markers at site
Laramie	Ivinson Mansion	603 E Ivinson Avenue	Houses the Laramie Plains Museum. Multiple markers at site
Laramie	Fort Sanders	Intersection of US 287 and Cavalryman Ranch Road; 41.26840°N 105.5957°W	Used from 1866-1882 on the emigrant trails
Laramie	Laramie and Union Pacific Railroad	1502 S 3rd Street	Laramie was founded in 1868 upon the arrival of the Union Pacific Railroad
Laramie	Laramie Timeline	301 South First Street	Historic Laramie Timeline embedded in a patio
Laramie	Fort Sanders Guardhouse	151 S Kiowa Street	Fort Sanders Established September 5, 1866 Abandoned May 18, 1882 Named after Brigadier General William P. Sanders a National Register of Historic Places
Laramie	Steen Gronlund	1855 W Curtis Street	Steen Gronlund, Citizen Driver. 49 years on the road include 5.34 million accident-free miles.
Laramie	The Franchise	321 South Second Street	Right of women to vote in 1869
Laramie	The Overland Trail	3184 Snowy Range Road	Overland Trail started in 1825 by William Ashley and the Rocky Mountain Fur Company
Medicine Bow	Albany County Train Robberies	Hwy 30; 41.8649°N 106.0732°W	June 2, 1899 the Union Pacific Overland robbed
Medicine Bow	Dinosaur Graveyard	Hwy 30; 41.8649°N 106.0732°W	About Como Bluff fossil beds of dinosaurs
Medicine Bow	Geologic Sign	Libby Flats off Hwy 30	Medicine Bow Mountains geology on Snowy Range Scenic Byway
Rock River	Rock Creek trail	4000 County Road 67	Rock Creek on the trail from Fort Halleck and Fort Laramie
Tie Siding	The Overland Stage Line	36292 U.S Highway 287	The Overland Stage Line from 1862 to 1868 crossed the Colorado-Wyoming boundary line

== See also ==
- List of National Historic Landmarks in Wyoming
- National Register of Historic Places listings in Wyoming
- Carbon County, Wyoming monuments and markers
