= 8th Wyoming Territorial Legislature =

←	7th	9th	→

Overview
- Legislative body: Wyoming Legislature
- Jurisdiction: Wyoming Territory, United States
- Meeting place: Commercial Block
- Term: 1884–1886

Wyoming Council
- Members: 12 Senators
- President of the Council: William H. Holliday
- Party control: Democratic

Wyoming House of Representatives
- Members: 23 Representatives
- Speaker of the House: F. H. Jones
- Party control: Democratic

The 8th Wyoming Territorial Legislature was a former meeting of the Wyoming Legislature that lasted from January 8, to March 7, 1884.

== History ==
On January 8, 1884, the territorial legislature convened in the Commercial Block in Cheyenne although E. U. Snider would not be seated until January 9. William C. Irvine made a motion to have Philip Dater selected as temporary President of the Council and it was accepted. On January 9, Robert H. Homer made a motion to have William H. Holliday selected as permanent President of the Council and it was accepted.

On January 8, John F. Coad made a motion to have N. N. Craig selected as temporary Speaker of the House of Representatives and it was accepted. On January 9, the selection of the permanent Speaker of the House started. F. H. Jones was nominated by O. C. Smith and D. Miller was nominated by Coad. The House of Representatives voted fourteen to nine in favor of Jones and a motion by Coad to make Jones' nomination unanimous was accepted.

== Membership ==
=== Council ===
Affiliation	Party (Shading indicates majority caucus)		Total	
Affiliation	Democratic	Republican	Total	Vacant
Beginning of 8th Legislature	8	4	12	0
Latest voting share	66.67%	33.33%		

=== Members of the Wyoming Council ===
Representative	Party	Residence	Counties represented
A. T. Babbitt			Laramie
Philip Dater			Laramie
John W. Gray			Albany
P. J. Hines			Sweetwater
William H. Holliday	Democratic		Albany
Robert H. Homer	Democratic		Albany
William C. Irvine	Republican		Laramie
A. V. Quinn			Uinta
Francis E. Warren	Republican		Laramie
E. S. Whittier			Uinta

=== House of Representatives ===
Affiliation	Party (Shading indicates majority caucus)		Total	
Affiliation	Democratic	Republican	Total	Vacant
Beginning of 8th Legislature	13	9	23	0
Latest voting share	59.09%	40.91%		

=== Members of the Wyoming Council ===
Representative	Party	Residence	Counties represented
Hiram Allen			Carbon
C. H. Bussard			Albany
Thomas J. Cahill			Laramie
John F. Coad			Laramie
N. N. Craig			Laramie
Charles Deloney			Uinta
O. D. Downey			Albany
D. F. Dudley			Carbon
J. H. Ford			Laramie
Leroy Grant			Albany
H. V. S. Groesbeck			Albany
A. Jackson			Laramie
F. H. Jones			Sweetwater
L. D. Kennedy			Albany
D. Miller			Laramie
H. G. Nickerson			Sweetwater
L. Quealy			Carbon
F. W. Schwartze			Laramie
R. B. Seaton			Uinta
O. C. Smith			Sweetwater
E. U. Snider			Johnson
H. E. Teschemacher			Laramie
W. H. Weaver			Carbon
