= Herman Gould Nickerson =

American pioneer (1841-1927)

- Nickerson in 1921

Member of the Wyoming Council 8th Wyoming Territorial Legislature
- In office January 8, 1884 – March 7, 1884
- Succeeded by: A. T. Chalice

Indian agent in Lander, Wyoming
- In office 1893 – May 1, 1902

Personal details
- Born: Hermon Gould Nickerson; May 4, 1841 Litchfield, Ohio
- Died: October 23, 1927 (aged 86) Thermopolis, Wyoming
- Resting place: Mount Hope Cemetery in Lander, Wyoming, U.S. 42.825056°N 108.712472°W
- Party: Republican
- Spouse: Harriet Justina Kelsey (m. 1851–1921)
- Children: 4
- Occupation: American pioneer, Farmer, US Army Captain, Indian agent, Wyoming Legislature member, and Judge
- Nickname: Captain H. G. Nickerson

Herman Gould Nickerson, (Captain H. G. Nickerson) was an American pioneer, born in Litchfield, Ohio of Medina County on May 4, 1841. Nickerson died on October 23, 1927, at the age of 86 in Thermopolis, Wyoming. Nickerson is buried in Mount Hope Cemetery in Lander, Wyoming. Herman Gould Nickerson's father was Erastus Nickerson (-1892), who manufactured shoes. His mother was Harriet (Clifford) Nickerson, also a native of the state of Ohio. Nickerson was an American Civil War Veteran, politician, gold miner, Wyoming historian and judge.

== Biography ==
Nickerson joined the United States Army on December 14, 1861, when he was 22. He enlisted in the Union army Company D with the 23rd Ohio Infantry Regiment as a First sergeant. Later, he was transferred to the 186th Ohio Infantry Regiment, where he was promoted to Captain of Company I. He fought in the American Civil War till it ended on September 18, 1865. Nickerson took part in The Battles of Bull Run and the Battle of Antietam. At the Battle of South Mountain, he was captured and became a POW for three months, held at the Libby Prison. He joined General Sherman's March to the Sea. After the war, he went back to Ohio to study law, but moved to Powder River in Montana to look for gold in 1866. Montana gold was discovered in 1852, and the 1862 Homestead Acts drew many American settlers to Montana. He moved out west on the Oregon Trail in an ox-drawn covered wagon. Not finding much gold, he moved to South Pass, Wyoming for mining. Nickerson married Miss Harriet Justina Kelsey (1851-1921) on April 13, 1874, while in Elyria, Ohio. Harriet and Herman had four children. Nickerson entered politics in 1871, he was elected as a member of the Wyoming Legislature. Next, Nickerson was elected to the office of county treasurer for Fremont County, Wyoming. From 1884 to 1887, Nickerson was a probate judge for Fremont County. In 1892, he was appointed to the United States General Land Office in Lander. Nickerson became an Indian agent in 1893 in Lander. Nickerson also served as the first county superintendent of schools of Sweetwater County, Wyoming, chairman of the board of county commissioners of Fremont County, and a justice of the peace in Lander. Nickerson owned 160 acres of farmland next to Lander. Nickerson resigned his post as Indian agent on May 1, 1902. Captain Nickerson was the first president of the Wyoming Oregon Trail Commission from 1913 to 1921. Nickerson made and placed Wyoming historical monuments and markers. Nickerson worked with Ezra Meeker and the Daughters of the American Revolution to help commemorate the Oregon Trail. With the Wyoming Oregon Trail Commission, Nickerson traveled the Oregon Trail, marking out routes and forts over the length of the trail in Wyoming. In July 1924, Nickerson wrote his memoirs about early Wyoming history.

== Women's suffrage in Wyoming ==
Nickerson is known for writing about early Women's suffrage in Wyoming and Esther Hobart Morris role in the suffrage tea party. Nickerson wrote in the Wyoming State Journal in February 14, 1919, about meeting with Morris and the suffrage tea party when he was a Member of the Wyoming Council. He wrote:

To Mrs. Esther Morris is due the credit and honor of advocating and originating woman's suffrage in the United States.

Grace Raymond Hebard a historian, used Nickerson writtings in 1920 to tell the history of the early Women's suffrage in Wyoming. Hebard pamphlet based on Nickerson writtings was titled "How Woman Suffrage Came to Wyoming (1869)"

== Gallery ==
Ezra Meeker and Capt. H. G. Nickerson in 1915, founders of the Wyoming Oregon Trail Commission. Both American pioneers of the Oregon Trail.

Fort Augur-Fort Brown historical marker in 1914. Made and placed by Capt. H. G. Nickerson, president of the Wyoming Oregon Trail Commission from 1913 to 1921. The fort was renamed Fort Washakie in honor of Chief Washakie

Unveiling the Oregon Trait marker near Lingle, Wyoming on June 17. 1915. Built by Nickerson. Hon. Joseph M. Carey speaking. Carey was the 8th Governor of Wyoming.

== See also ==
- Wyoming Historical Landmarks
- Timeline of Wyoming history
- Albany County, Wyoming monuments and markers
- Carbon County, Wyoming monuments and markers
- List of National Historic Landmarks in Wyoming
- National Register of Historic Places listings in Wyoming
