= Grace Raymond Hebard =

American historian and educator (1861–1936)

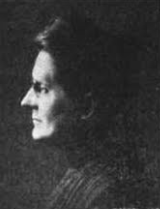
- Grace Raymond Hebard, 1921
- Born: July 2, 1861; Clinton, Iowa
- Died: October, 1936 (aged 75); Laramie, Wyoming
- Education: Illinois Wesleyan University, The University of Iowa
- Occupations: Educator, Historian, Social Activist
- Partner: Agnes Wergeland

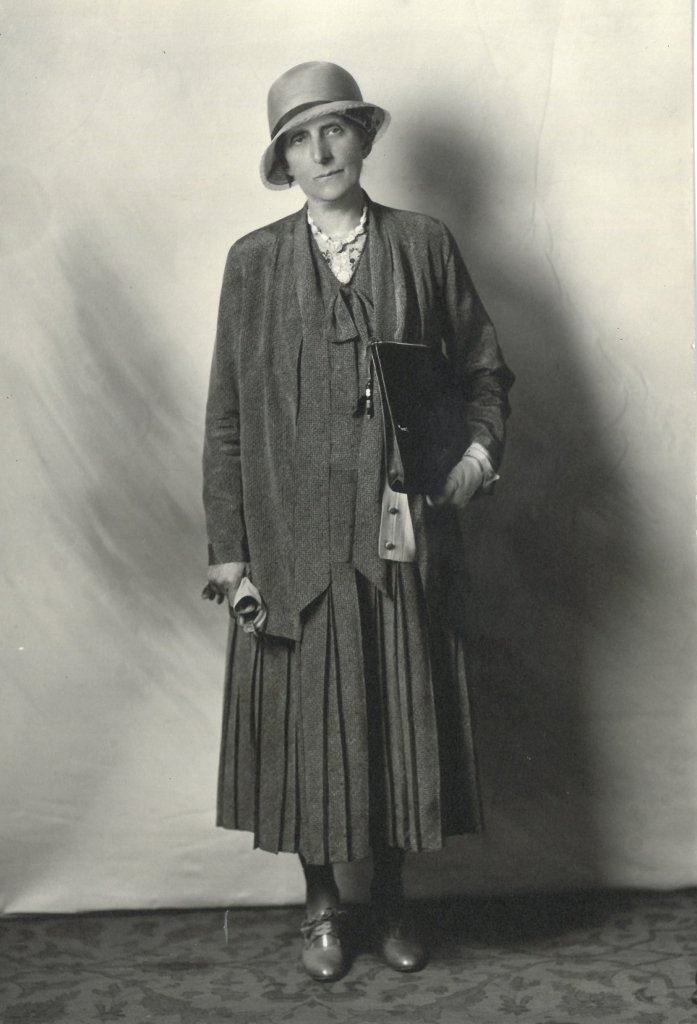
Wyoming pioneer Grace Raymond Hebard broke new ground as a university administrator, historian, and social activist. The intrepid field researcher explored Wyoming's countryside for most of her adult life, seeking to document a fast-disappearing frontier.

Grace Raymond Hebard (July 2, 1861 – October 1936) was an American historian, suffragist, scholar, writer, political economist, and noted University of Wyoming educator. Hebard's standing as a historian in part rose from her years trekking Wyoming's high plains and mountains seeking first-hand accounts of Wyoming's early pioneers. Today, her books on Wyoming history are sometimes challenged due to her romanticization of the Old West, spurring questions regarding accuracy of her research findings. In particular, her conclusion after decades of field research that Sacajawea (participant in the Lewis and Clark Expedition) was buried in Wyoming's Wind River Indian Reservation is questioned.

Hebard served as the first female on the University of Wyoming Board of Trustees, where she exercised authority over the university finances, its president, and faculty. Her University of Wyoming role extended to establishing the university's first library. Hebard served as a professor for 28 years. She was also the first woman admitted to the Wyoming State Bar Association (1898); admitted to practice before the Wyoming Supreme Court (1914); and appointed by her peers as vice president of the National Society of Women Lawyers.

She was active in Wyoming political life, giving speeches, organizing historical associations, conducting citizenship classes for immigrants, participating in the local and national suffragist movement, lobbying for child-welfare laws, serving as a Red Cross volunteer, and selling war bonds during World War I.

== Background ==
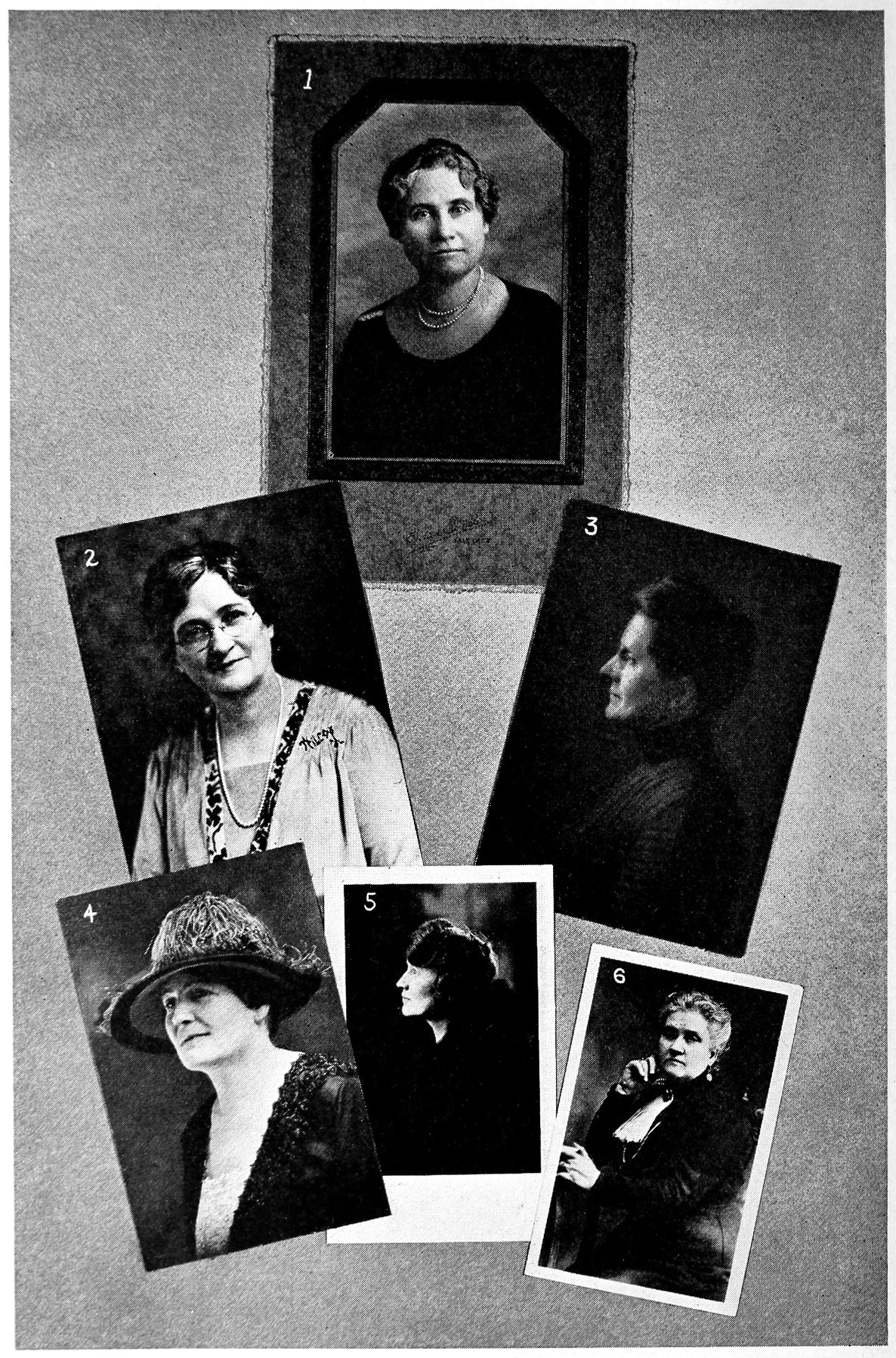
Alice Louise Reynolds, Amy Brown Lyman, Grace Raymond Hebard, Fanny Maughan Vernon, Ruth Moench Bell, Susa Young Gates

Grace Hebard was born in the Mississippi river town of Clinton, Iowa, on July 2, 1861, to Rev. George Diah Alonzo Hebard (1831–1870) and Margaret E. Dominick Hebard (Marven). Her family soon moved to Iowa City where her father, a missionary and a later territorial legislator, built a new Presbyterian church. Hebard took her B.S. in what is now civil engineering at the University of Iowa in 1882. She was a member of Pi Beta Phi Women's Fraternity. Hebard became the first woman to "be graduated from the Civil Engineering Dep(artment) of the University," according to documents at the University of Iowa Library. In later years, Hebard reflected in a 1928 letter to a colleague on her singular experience as a female engineering student:

"I met with many discouragements and many sneers and much opposition to my enrolling in the scientific course, which was then entirely a man's college. ... All kinds of discouraging predictions were made that I would fail, that it was impossible for a woman to do the kind of work I was undertaking."

Hebard later resumed her studies by correspondence and earned an M.A. from the University of Iowa in 1885. Finally, again by correspondence, she received her Ph.D. in political science from Illinois Wesleyan University in 1893.

Hebard made her way west in 1882 to Cheyenne, eight years before Wyoming became a state in 1890. Hebard arrived at the future capital city in the company of her mother and brothers; Fred, Lockwood, and her sister, Alice. She became part of the social scene with other young people at the newly constructed Cheyenne Club, where cattle barons, often wealthy Europeans, held sway over Cheyenne. Yet general violence and roughness were still common. Rowdy cowhands wearing guns in the saloons and prostitutes openly plying their trade in brothels made for a sometimes raucous downtown. Citizens were known to hand out their own form of retribution, however, if things got out of hand. For example, in 1883 a crowd lynched an accused murderer, leaving him hanging from a Cheyenne telephone pole.

Hebard's college education distinguished her from such local citizens. The young engineer found work at the surveyor general's office, where she served as the only female draftsman in the city, according to the University of Wyoming archives. Hebard rose to the position of deputy state engineer, reporting at first to Elwood Mead. Mead made his mark drafting Wyoming Territory water laws and later as head of the U.S. Bureau of Reclamation.

Yet engineering was not to be Hebard's calling. Instead, after nine years in Cheyenne, she left her family and ventured 50 miles west across a boulder-strewn mountain range to the railroad town of Laramie. This small town in Southeastern Wyoming, which began as a tent city mid-1860s, was home to a fledgling university when Hebard arrived in 1891. Laramie's scruffy prairie campus became the locale from which Hebard launched a storied career in higher education, devoting more than 45 years (1891–1936) to the University of Wyoming.

== University trustee ==
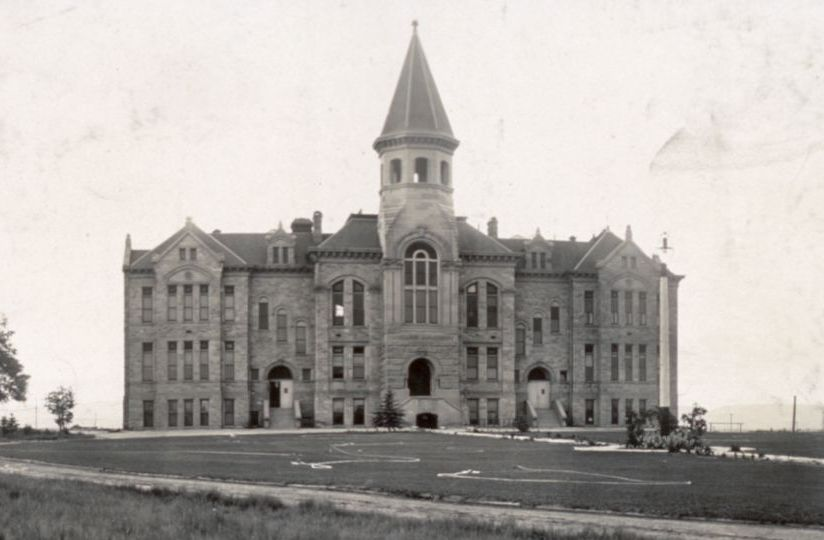
The University of Wyoming in 1908, some 17 years after Hebard's arrival, remained an isolated campus adjoining the prairie on the eastern edge of Laramie.

In 1891 Grace Hebard parlayed the recommendation of Republican U.S. Senator Joseph M. Carey of Cheyenne, whom she had known since childhood into an appointment by acting Governor Amos Barber as a salaried secretary to and member of the University of Wyoming Board of Trustees. The 30-year-old woman found herself in uncharted territory as she navigated the male-dominated world of university governance. She soon learned that her administrative journey through the halls of higher education would not be without hazards. Yet from the beginning, Hebard wielded her position as trustee with considerable force, serving until 1903 but continuing as secretary until 1908. Hebard dominated the university administration for 17 years, exercising "all pervasive" influence.

She administered from a position of strength, ranging from setting university policy to managing its finances. Hebard directed the university's finances with near independence, excluding an annual review, from any administrative oversight of the daily expenditures she authorized. Hebard later remarked that "The Trustees gave me a great deal of power, and I used it."

The university struggled financially during the recession years of the mid-1890s. The six high schools in sparsely populated Wyoming in 1894 could muster but eight graduates from which the university could seek to enroll freshman students. The under-funded university relied upon federal research grants to its Agricultural Experiment Station. The president of the board of trustees, with Hebard as secretary, chaired this important arm of the university. Hebard consolidated her position with the Agricultural Experiment Station, as she had with the trustees, into one of decision-making authority.

The influence that Hebard exercised over the university finances, its president, and faculty was considerable. Rumors emerged that conflict with Hebard and her oversight of faculty appointments prompted President A. A. Johnson to resign. Her "iron rule" of campus invariably revolved around her authority over finances, including expenditures of federal grants. Questions about the use and perhaps misuse of federal funds arose, sparking increased scrutiny of the board of trustees, all of whom were Republicans.

Democratic furor at the "Republican regime" played out in the local newspapers where 1907 charges of graft and partisan awarding of university printing contracts and improper expenditures of federal grants brought fierce criticism of Hebard's authority and domination, according to university historian Deborah Hardy. The state's Democratic press piled on. One sharply worded account claimed: "It's a standing remark in Laramie that no professor or employee of the institution can hold his job without being branded 'OK' by Miss Secretary Hebard, and whenever she decrees it the president's head will fall in the basket." Yet despite the uproar, a governor-appointed investigative commission found "that there had been no interference by Miss Hebard." Nonetheless, still under attack from the press and internally at the university, Hebard resigned as secretary to the trustees.

The end of Hebard's university administrative career in 1908 marked the beginning a rich phase in her teaching, writing, and field research. In 1908, the same university board which had been under the harsh spotlight of public criticism during Hebard's tenure as trustee appointed her as full professor. Hebard held the post until she died 28 years later.

== Author ==
Grace Hebard continued breaking new ground when she became the university's first librarian. Hebard assumed the role of librarian, without pay, beginning in 1894. She established a library from some "sacks of books" that she found in a small locked room at the university. Hebard received appointment as the university's first official librarian in 1908. Hebard continued serving as librarian until 1919. The catalogued collection of books had grown to 42,000 volumes by the end of her tenure. Hebard launched her formal career as a classroom teacher when she received an appointment in 1906 as the university's head of the Department of Political Economy.

Hebard extended her academic activities to include serving on an advisory board for the Wyoming Historical Association. This affiliation helped point her towards her new research pursuit, spearheading trail marking in Wyoming for the Oregon Trail and other pioneer routes. Hebard's work included mapping old trails in Wyoming, particularly the Oregon Trail. However, she contributed more than cartography. Hebard began collecting historical documents and other materials regarding Wyoming history.

Moreover, she traveled the state, seeking interviews with Old West pioneers and spent several summers among the Shoshone Indians of Wyoming. Prior to her death in 1936, Hebard bequeathed her collection to the University of Wyoming. Her papers characteristically included her own maps, publications, field books, and writings. Her often romanticized view of the Old West shaped the books that she wrote on Wyoming history. Hebard's published works include:

- The Government of Wyoming (1904),
- The Pathbreakers from River to Ocean (1911),
- The Bozeman Trail (1922), co-author with E.A. Brinninstool (collaboration done entirely via correspondence)
- Washakie (1930),
- Sacajawea (1933)

Illness and ultimately her death ended progress on what would have been Hebard's final book, an account of the Pony Express. Famed frontiersman and expeditionary photographer William Henry Jackson collaborated with Hebard as an illustrator in 1933 and 1934. He provided water colors and sketches for her unpublished manuscript. Hebard's association with Jackson began in 1920, when her research led to a request for a copy of a photograph of Chief Washakie made by Jackson during the Hayden Geological Survey.

== Mythmaker ==
The U.S. Census Bureau declared the western frontier closed in 1890, eight years after Grace Hebard's arrival in Cheyenne at 21 years of age. Yet for Grace Hebard, the grand sweep of the mythic West stretched wide open to interpretation, resulting in Hebard placing her research subjects in a "highly romanticized" West.

Critics such as author Mike Mackey assert that "Hebard's 'histories' have resulted in many interpretations in Wyoming of past events which never took place, but are now believed by many in the state to be facts." He adds that "Often when the facts did not support her thesis, Hebard made up her own 'facts.'"

In particular, Hebard's 30 years of research which lead to the 1933 biography of the Shoshone woman who accompanied the Lewis and Clark Expedition is called into question by critics. Hebard presents a stout-hearted woman in a biography that is "undeniably long on romance and short on hard evidence, suffering from a sentimentalization of Indian culture".

Hebard crafts a picture of Sacajawea as a restless spirit who wandered to Canada, Washington State, California, Arizona, Wyoming, and beyond. A person, according to testimony gathered by Hebard, so revered by the Whites that she rode stagecoaches for free and who "rendered great service both in urging the Shoshones to learn to farm ... and that the buffalo and other game animals would soon be gone."

If Sacajawea appears as a grand figure in Hebard's writings, so do Sacajawea's descendants. Consider for instance the heroic imagery Hebard uses in "Sacajawea" when she describes 90-year-old Maggie Bazil Large, whom Hebard contends was the granddaughter of Sacajawea. Hebard, without citing a source, recounts when Large reportedly attended the funeral of a person who was, according to Hebard, another descendant of Sacajawea. Hebard describes Large as a woman who "exhibited great energy in an emergency" when the ropes used to lower a coffin became fouled. Hebard further expands on the actions of the valiant Large:

"An ancient, white-haired woman sprang forward, took the ropes in her own hands, and, bracing herself, successfully lowered the box to its resting place with a dexterity that challenged the skill of the young men present. She seems to have possessed something of the alertness, power to do, and energy of her grandmother [Sacajawea].

Hebard reveals the lens through which she viewed the subject of her research during a 1915 visit to Sacajawea's reported grave in isolated Central Wyoming:

"In August, 1915, the author made a pilgrimage to the cemetery of the Wind river reservation for the purpose of paying humble tribute to Sacajawea. ... A well-beaten path from the wooden stile to Sacjawea's grave makes no guide post necessary. Annually thousands of people journey to this last resting place... ."

In retrospect, Hebard's reputation as a historian is diminished by her reliance upon unsubstantiated oral histories she gathered from Native Americans as she "prosecuted her search for authentic historical material which would enable her to rescue Sacajawea from the semi-oblivion into which her name had fallen, and give to her legitimate place in the history of the great northwest." However, the claim continues today that Hebard's research placing Sacajawea at the Wyoming Indian Reservation was largely one of mistaken identity.

Nonetheless, Hebard stood firm regarding her Sacajawea findings. She held to her viewpoint that she had demonstrated, "beyond a question of doubt", the true identify of Sacajawea. Hebard had a final piece of evidence to present. About one year before her death in 1936 Hebard revealed a "secret" to her protégé Agnes Wright Spring that she asked Wright not to reveal until after Hebard's death. Hebard shared that the Indians had given her a name while doing research on the Wind River Indian Reservation. The Indians, Hebard said, had named her Zont-Tumah-Two-Wiper-Hinze, meaning: the good white woman, the woman with one tongue. "They [the Indians] felt, she said, that she was telling the truth about their Indian ancestor."

Hebard is still an important figure, according to historian Phil Roberts, despite shortcomings in her research. Roberts notes that Hebard "was conscious of the need to chronicle the history of Wyoming while many of the actors were still alive. Unfortunately, she was constrained by the same problems faced by today's historians. Without dependable source materials, one can make false assumptions that may not reflect the historical record."

== Trail trekker ==
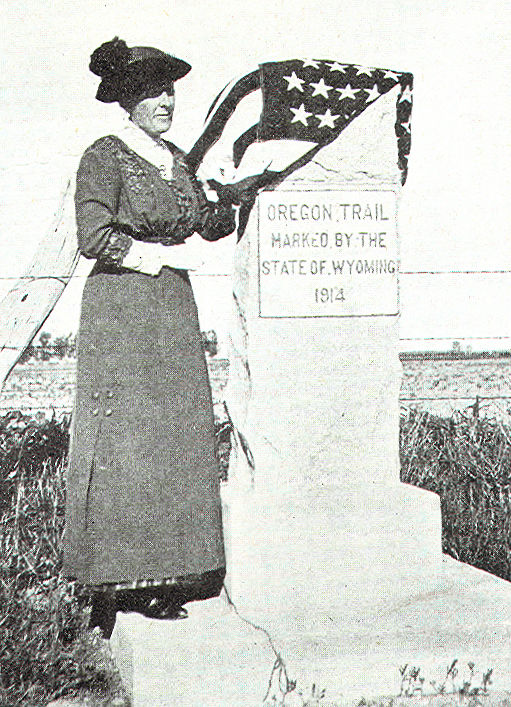
The Wyoming Oregon Trail Commission, in close association with Grace Hebard and Captain H.G. Nickerson, placed at least 31 markers throughout Wyoming between 1913–1915.

Grace Hebard had a passion for marking, preserving, and commemorating the quickly disappearing frontier. She helped found organizations such as the Wyoming Oregon Trail Commission and participated in Wyoming Historical Association and the state chapter of the Daughters of the American Revolution (DAR). As state historian for the D.A.R., she helped erect and dedicate historic markers in elaborate unveiling ceremonies at sites throughout Wyoming. Locations included iconic Oregon Trail landmarks, such as Fort Laramie and Independence Rock; as well as less known sites on the Bozeman Trail and the Pony Express route. During her tenure as State Regent of the Wyoming DAR, she selected a design by Verna Keays as the official Flag of Wyoming.

Hebard was a tumbleweed of activity. Summers often found her bouncing along Wyoming's sagebrush rangeland, sometimes by horse and wagon and later by automobile, searching for Oregon Trail ruts or seeking to locate yet another historic site or pioneer to corner for an interview. Only after the High Plain's long winter had retreated would conditions become favorable for Hebard's expeditions. Although the record shows that she sometimes strapped on snowshoes to continue her explorations in the winter. But even summer treks presented difficulties. Thunder boomers easily turned the primitive tracks that then served as roads into impassable quagmires of Wyoming mud.

Summer rains producing axle-deep mud were but part of the problem. She noted while marking the Oregon Trail in Western Wyoming with Civil War veteran and former bullwhacker Captain H.G. Nickerson that she traveled:

"...with a team [of horses] about 800 miles, consuming the warm months of the summer of 1913 and 1914, with much inconvenience and hardship, owing to the frequent rains storms, and often high winds, deep dust and the mosquitoes, the insects often driving us from the streams out in the hills or plains to camp, making camping in the open country very disagreeable."

Hebard particularly recognized the efforts of Nickerson in Wyoming trail marking. Nickerson, who had lived in the South Pass area since 1868, later became president of the Oregon Trail Commission of Wyoming. Hebard saluted his work locating and marking old western trails during a period of eight years noting that: "Here and there Captain Nickerson has placed stones, boulders and slabs of native material on which he, in the open, has carved with his chisels and mallet inscriptions and notations.

Trail marking naturally often included remote locations. Yet Wyoming's isolated rangeland and mountain passes did not prevent trail boosters such as Hebard and the Daughters of the American Revolution from staging formal unveiling ceremonies with a pageantry of music and "religious, patriotic and historical exercises, prayer, national songs and addresses." Stone markers placed by Nickerson, Ezra Meeker, Hebard, and others (some weighing several tons) are still found throughout Wyoming and are monuments to the state's early historic preservation efforts.

== Americanization ==
Of all Grace Hebard's accomplishments, she reportedly valued her Americanization work as "perhaps most precious." Scholar Frank Van Nuys notes that a Wyoming News testimonial expressed in 1935 that Dr. Hebard's "certificates of preparation for naturalization were accepted by the United States District Court in lieu of examinations for citizenship."

Van Nuys goes on to note: "That sort of clout suggests that Grace Hebard's Americanization enterprise beginning in 1916 deserves some scrutiny. While the evidence of her work is fragmentary, it nonetheless places Hebard within an essentially progressive tradition of qualified optimism about immigrants' ability to assimilate to Anglo-American cultural norms.

Hebard's indoctrination of new Americans came on the heels of the greatest wave of migrants to ever enter the country. Millions of new immigrants from Eastern and Southern Europe entered the United States, mostly through Ellis Island, from 1880 to 1915. New Americans, with their new languages, foods, and customs were not always welcome. One of the early targets where the Chinese who were locked out from immigrating to the U. S. by the Chinese Seclusion Act. This federal act passed in 1882 coincided with Hebard's arrival in Cheyenne.

Hebard's progressive work with immigrants in Laramie would have been in stark contrast to the national tension between residents and immigrants. Such tension spurred the National Origins Act of 1924, which favored Northern European immigrants, but restricted East European Jews.

Hebard's view of immigration from the High Plains of Wyoming would have been shaped by news that reached her while living in Cheyenne. On September 2, 1885, rioters killed at least 28 Chinese miners and wounded 15 in a violent labor dispute, since dubbed the "Rock Springs Massacre." In Rock Springs (about 155 miles west of Cheyenne) the local newspaper endorsed the outcome of the riot, while other Wyoming newspapers, limited support to sympathy for the causes of the white miners.

Hebard's activism placed her against the prevailing social and political winds that swept through Wyoming and the nation. The way Hebard lived her feminist life, including her deep relationship with fellow Professor Agnes M. Wergeland, spoke volumes about her worldview. Wergeland, like Hebard a feminist, was a trail breaker in her own right. The Norwegian immigrant was the first woman from her country to earn a Ph.D. Wergeland, who became a U.S. citizen in 1902, found in Hebard an ideal tutor for Americanization. Hebard noted: "Dr. Wergeland had never had a realistic conception of what absolute suffrage for women meant until she came to Wyoming, where women are not restricted in their right to vote in any way."

== Suffragist ==
National suffragists heralded Wyoming when on Dec. 10, 1869, territorial Gov. John A. Campbell signed the suffrage act into law. Suffragists were not so celebratory two years later when legislators seeking to repeal women's enfranchisement failed by a single vote, according to historian Phil Roberts. Roberts cites the late T.A. Larson's research that found suffrage detractors feared women voters would seek Sunday closing of saloons. Yet, Hebard in a 1920 interview with the New York Tribune failed to account for opposition to women's suffrage in Wyoming, noting:

"I never before saw an anti-suffragist. You know, out in Wyoming we have had woman suffrage for fifty years, and there is no such thing as an anti-suffrage man in our state -- much less a woman."

Yet it was because of such anti-suffragists that Esther Hobart Morris made history for women in Wyoming in 1870 when she received an appointment as the nation's first female justice of the peace. Morris' historic posting in South Pass City, a mining town in Central Wyoming, followed the previous justice resigning in protest of Wyoming's suffrage legislation. Hebard spent many years advancing a claim that can be traced back to her trail marking companion Captain H.G. Nickerson that Morris was an instigator and co-author of that legislation. That claim is considered false by some recent researchers.

Hebard and Nickerson erected a rock cairn monument in 1920 near Morris' South Pass City cabin as a crude memorial. A granite marker latter replaced the cairn with an inscription identifying Morris as co-author of Wyoming's suffrage bill. The Wyoming Division of State Park's and Historic Sites has tried to correct the record noting that "recent studies indicate that [William H.]Bright was the only author of the suffrage bill." Author Virginia Scharff reads more than imperfect history into Hebard's statements concerning Morris. Scharff sees Hebard's portrayal of Morris as a suffragist as being rendered "in her [Hebard's] own image."

Being the first of western territories or states to adopt women's suffrage placed Wyoming in the national spotlight. National suffragists in subsequent years found a potent symbol in Wyoming enfranchising women as states voted on the Nineteenth Amendment to the U.S. Constitution granting suffrage to women. Carrie Chapman Catt, who was president of the National American Woman Suffrage Association, incorrectly claimed that Wyoming "gave so much evidence of positive good to the community arising from the votes of women that she became the direct cause of the establishment of woman suffrage in all of the surrounding states." Larson challenged such broad generalization noting that there is "no short, simple, all-encompassing explanation for the West's priority in woman suffrage."

If support for social justice as the national suffragists claimed did not fully explain Wyoming's lead role in suffrage, what did? One factor was the prospect of free advertising that lawmakers expected to arise following the passage of the territorial suffrage bill, according to Larson. The reasoning ran that the national attention would attract settlers, especially women. The record is unclear if Wyoming territorial adoption of suffrage influenced Hebard's decision to migrate to Wyoming in 1882.

Just as suffragist found an ideal symbol in Wyoming for their campaign, so too did Catt and others laud the feminist role of Hebard. Suffragists were eager to "hold her up as an example of the finest type of American womanhood," according to former Wyoming state historian Agnes Wright Spring. The fact that Hebard as a pathbreaker for women just happened to live in Laramie bolstered the credentials for her as a role model. For Laramie was home to the nation's first vote cast by a woman and where women first sat on a jury. Both historic events took place in 1870, before Hebard had finished her studies in Iowa.

Yet Hebard established her own standing as a suffragist when she petitioned the Wyoming constitutional convention to adopt a suffrage clause in advance of Wyoming entering the Union July 10, 1890. Moreover, national suffragists tapped Hebard to participate in the National American Woman Suffrage Association and later as a member of the Suffrage Emergency Brigade. The latter group lobbied Connecticut's governor for the state's legislature to become the 36th state to ratify the 19th Amendment. Subsequently, Hebard was among the select few who spoke at the 1920 suffragist celebration in Chicago following passage of the Nineteenth Amendment.

Hebard's association with national suffragist leader Catt allowed Hebard to achieve an "academic coup d'etat" in 1921. Hebard teamed up with Professor June Downey to convince faculty members to award the University of Wyoming's first honorary degree to Carrie Chapman Catt. Catt came to Laramie to receive the university honor and to present the baccalaureate address. The imagery of Catt appearing in Laramie where women voters and jurists made history would not have been lost on the suffragists. In addition, Catt was at the forefront of a one-year anniversary celebration of the 19th Amendment later that summer in New York City. Catt, following the suffrage victory, turned her focus to the newly established League of Women Voters. Hebard telegraphed Catt at the headquarters of the National American Woman Suffrage Association:

"Congratulations to you on this the first anniversary of the birth of national suffrage. I thank you for the Tennessee touchdown which scored victory."

== Final days ==
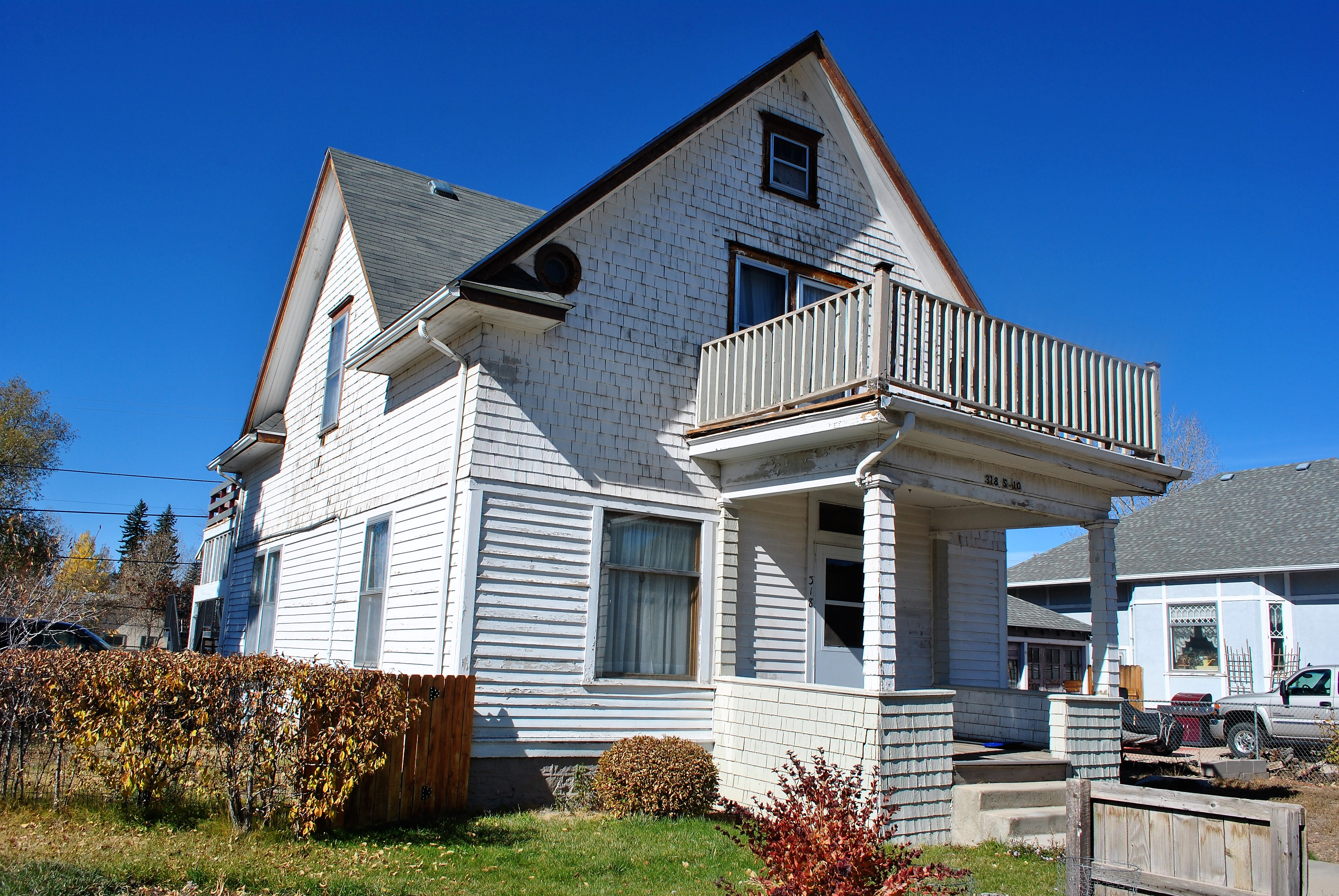
The Doctors' Inn

Grace Hebard retired from teaching in 1931. Yet she continued to research and collect historical material in her Laramie home, known to students and colleagues as "The Doctors Inn". Hebard lived in this house that she had built with her friend, Agnes Wergeland, who died in 1914. Grace's sister Alice Marvin Hebard then lived there until her death in 1928.

Hebard died in October 1936 at the age of 75. "To the time of death, she was a dominant -- and perhaps domineering -- figure on campus." The University of Wyoming held a memorial program in her honor later that month. The influence and impact of Hebard's life in part can be measured by the attendees at her funeral and contributors to the 50-page "In Memoriam" program published by her fellow faculty.

The memorial service had the trappings of a state funeral featuring testimonials from:

- Mr. and Mrs. Bryant Butler Brooks, former Wyoming governor
- Robert D. Carey, United States senator and former Wyoming governor
- Carrie Chapman Catt, president of the National American Woman Suffrage Association and former president of the International Woman Suffrage Alliance
- Frank Pierrepont Graves, president of the University of the State of New York; third University of Wyoming president
- W. H. Jackson, pioneer photographer and former member of Hayden Geological Survey
- Agnes Wright Spring, former Wyoming State Historian. Colorado State Historian.

The written tributes and eulogies following Hebard's death that colleagues, students, and friends delivered were added to Hebard's personal papers. Those papers are part of an extensive collection of documents that still bear Hebard's name today. The collection includes an almost terse tribute by Carrie Chapman Catt that overlooks Hebard's contributions to national suffragism for women:

"I shall miss Dr. Hebard more than words can say. My sympathy is extended to the University and all the Wyoming friends. She lived a great life."

Other contributors to the memorial program characteristically presented Hebard as a multi-faceted, action-driven feminist with a penchant for history and trail marking. Furthermore, Hebard garnered recognition as the first woman admitted to the Wyoming State Bar Association (1898) followed by her being admitted to practice before the Wyoming Supreme Court (1914). Hebard's peers also recognized her involvement in a variety of civic and public affairs, such as supporting American troops in World War I by selling war bonds and planting Victory Gardens. Moreover, she successfully spearheaded passage of a 1923 Wyoming child labor law.

Youth, particularly University of Wyoming students, played a special role in Hebard's career, as noted by testimonials from fellow students, faculty, and citizens. The memorial service program included a statement by university President Crane, "Above all she was a friend to generations of students." Similarly, an October 12, 1936, editorial in the student newspaper, the Branding Iron, noted: "In the death of Dr. Grace Raymond Hebard the students of the University have lost a friend."

Hebard furthered her legacy with students by funding a number of scholarships, including:

- The Agnes Mathilde Wergeland Memorial History Scholarship
- The Alice Marven Hebard Memorial Fund
- Hebard Map Scholarship Fund

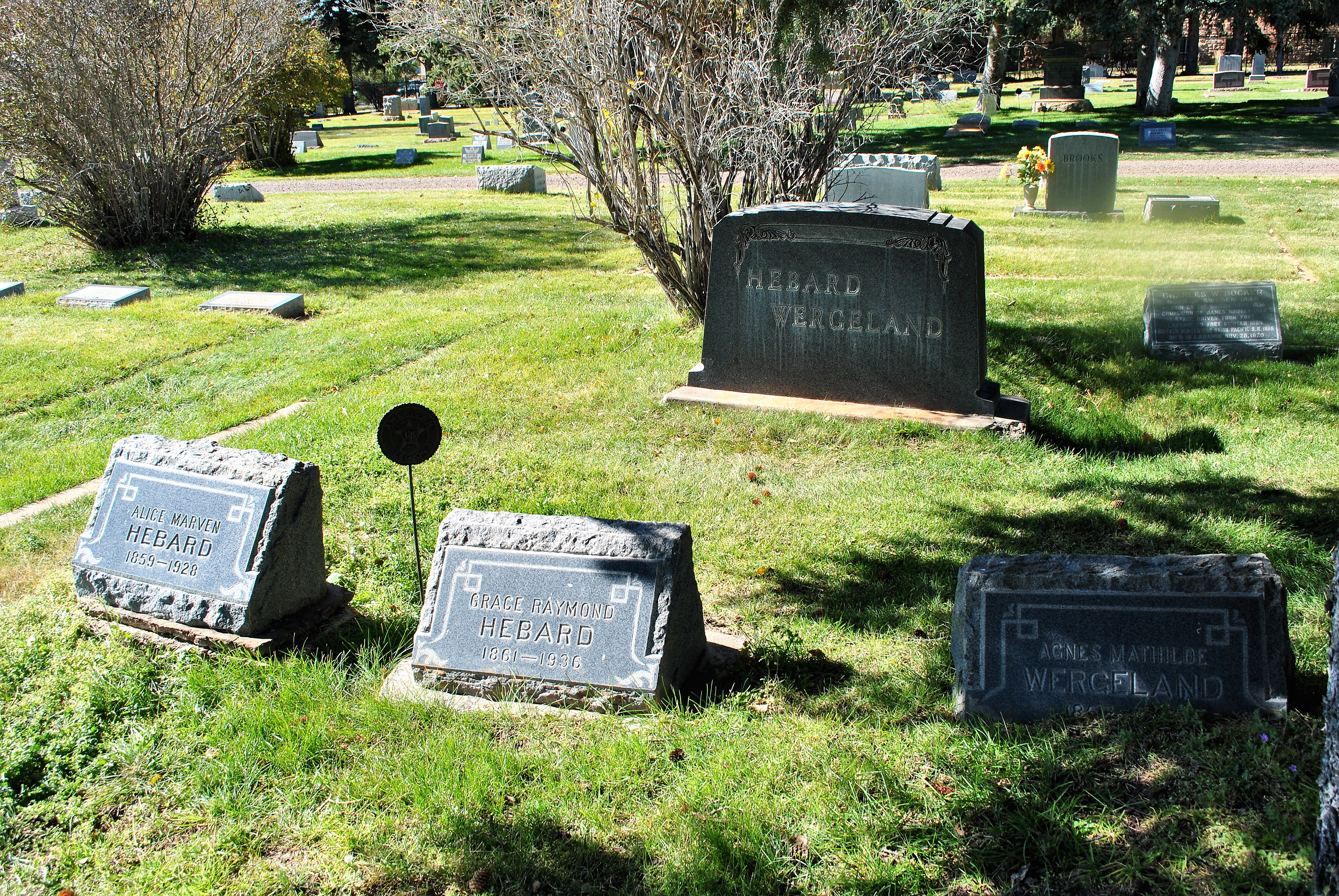
Hebard and Wergeland plot in Greenhill Cemetery

The intrepid Hebard is buried across the street from campus at the Greenhill Cemetery in Laramie in a plot near her sister and teacher, Alice, and Wergeland. A plaque memorializing Hebard is mounted on the famed Oregon Trail icon, Independence Rock; located in barren central Wyoming, about 50 miles southwest of Casper.

== See also ==
- Ezra Meeker
- Esther Hobart Morris
- List of first women lawyers and judges in Wyoming
- History of women's suffrage in the United States
- Oregon Trail
- Sacajawea
- University of Wyoming
