= Statue of Esther Hobart Morris =

Statue by Avard Fairbanks

Esther Hobart Morris
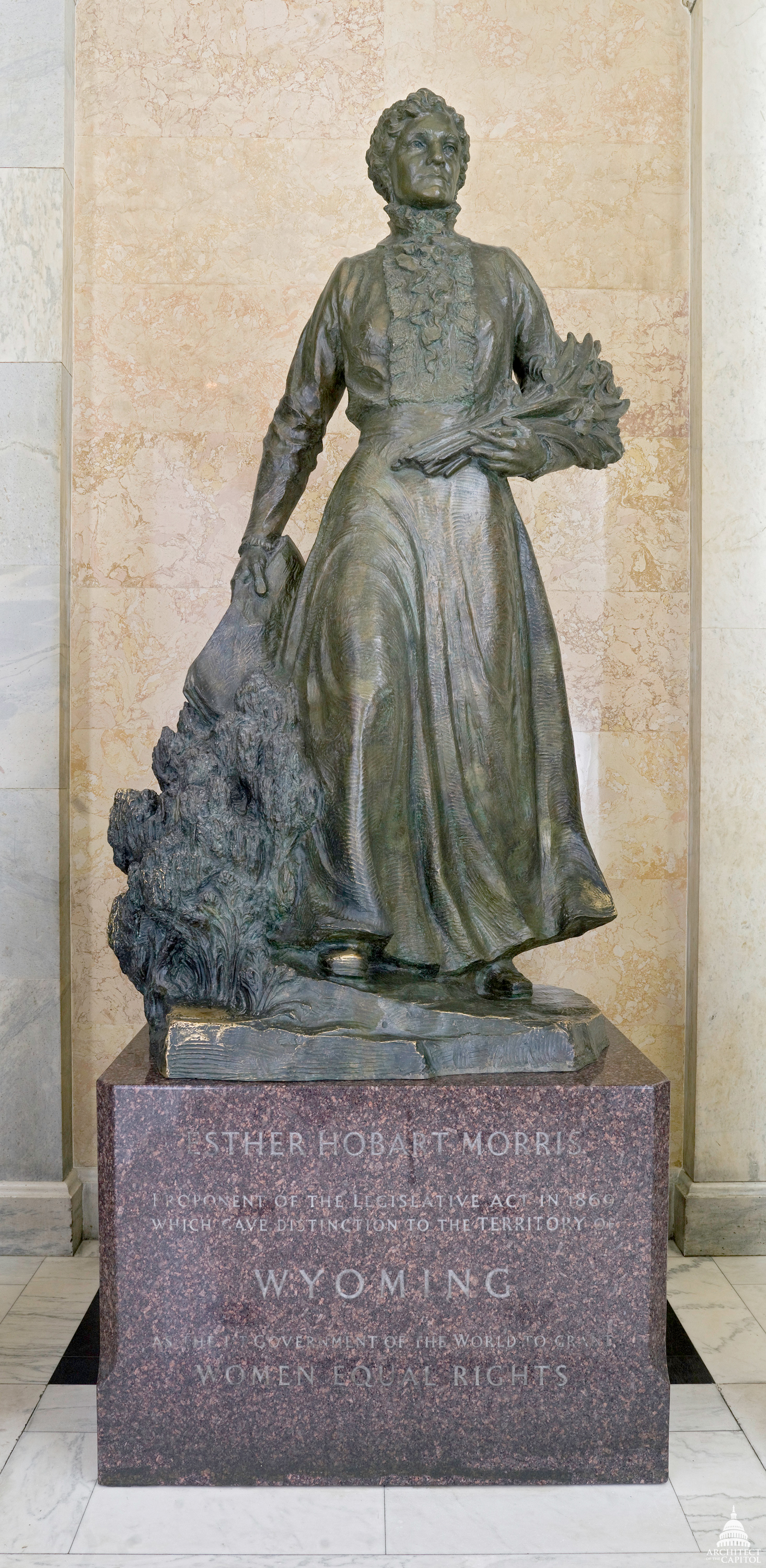
- The sculpture in the National Statuary Hall Collection
- Artist: Avard Fairbanks
- Medium: Bronze sculpture
- Subject: Esther Hobart Morris
- Location: Cheyenne, Wyoming; Washington, D.C.

Esther Hobart Morris is a bronze sculpture depicting the first woman justice of the peace in the United States by Avard Fairbanks.

One copy was installed outside the Wyoming State Capitol, in Cheyenne, Wyoming. It was moved inside the capitol building in 2019.

Another is installed in the United States Capitol's Hall of Columns, in Washington, D.C., as part of the National Statuary Hall Collection. The statue was gifted by the U.S. state of Wyoming in 1960.
