= Esther Hobart Morris =

American judge (1814–1902)

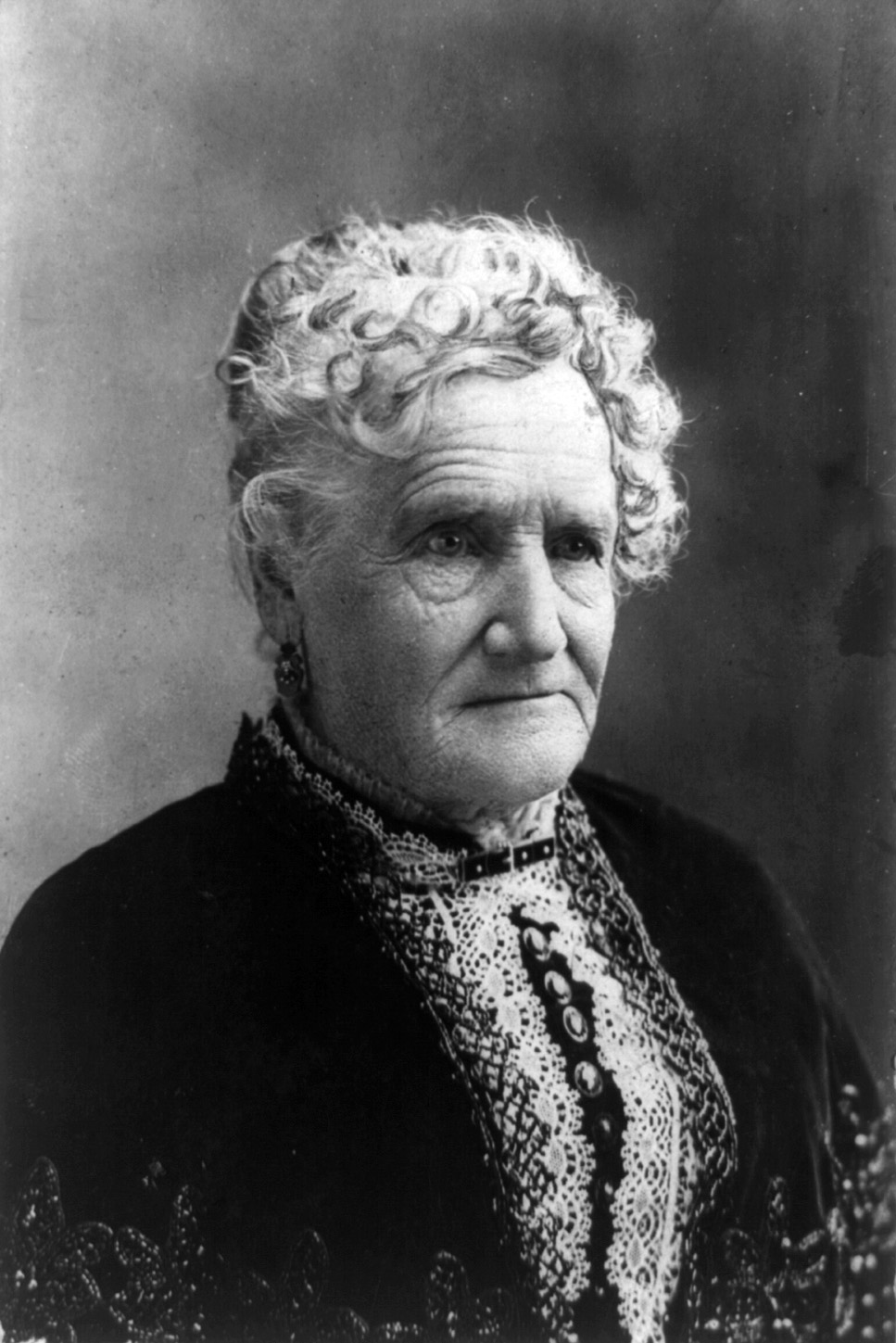
- Born: Esther Hobart McQuigg; August 8, 1814; Spencer, New York, U.S.
- Died: April 2, 1902 (aged 87); Cheyenne, Wyoming, U.S.
- Occupation: Justice of the peace
- Known for: Nation's first female judge
- Spouses: Artemus Slack (m. 1842; died 1843) John Morris (m. 1846; died 1877)

Esther Hobart Morris (August 8, 1814 – April 2, 1902) (Note: Most sources state that Morris was born in 1814. A biography published in 2019 states that she was born in 1812.) was an American judge who was the first woman justice of the peace in the United States. She began her tenure as justice in South Pass City, Wyoming, on February 14, 1870, serving a term of nearly nine months. The Sweetwater County Board of County Commissioners appointed Morris as justice of the peace after the previous justice, R. S. Barr, resigned in protest of Wyoming Territory's passage of the women's suffrage amendment in December 1869.

Popular stories and historical accounts, as well as by state and federal public monuments, point to Morris as a leader in the passage of Wyoming's suffrage amendment. However, Morris's leadership role in the legislation is disputed. Morris herself never claimed any credit, ascribing the bill entirely to William H. Bright, who was member of the territorial legislature from South Pass City and President of the Territorial Council.

== Early life ==
Esther Hobart McQuigg was born in the village of Spencer, Tioga County, New York, on August 8, 1814. It has been incorrectly reported she was orphaned at an early age. She actually grew up in a large family. Her mother died when Esther was fourteen, but she continued to live with her father, grandmother and siblings until age twenty-one. Esther then moved to the town of Owego and set up a millinery business.

Esther married Artemus Slack, an engineer for the railroad, in 1841. In May 1843, her husband died. Angry with the New York laws prohibiting women from owning property, Esther moved to Illinois, where her late husband had acquired property. In 1846 Esther Slack married John Morris in Ottawa, Illinois. They subsequently settled in Peru, Illinois where she gave birth to a son John in 1849 and twins Robert and Edward in 1851. Young John died as a toddler.

In 1868 Esther's husband John and her son Archibald "Archy" joined the throngs moving to South Pass City in Dakota Territory soon to become Wyoming Territory. They purchased mines and worked at various jobs making a place for Esther and the twins.

In 1869, Morris and her two 18-year-old twin sons, Robert and Edward, ventured west to rejoin the rest of their family. They first traveled by train to a waystation on the newly completed Transcontinental Railroad at Bryan, 15 miles from present-day Green River. From there, Morris and her boys continued north by stagecoach. They crossed the Sand Dunes before ascending a gradual mountain pass to the Sweetwater Mining District.

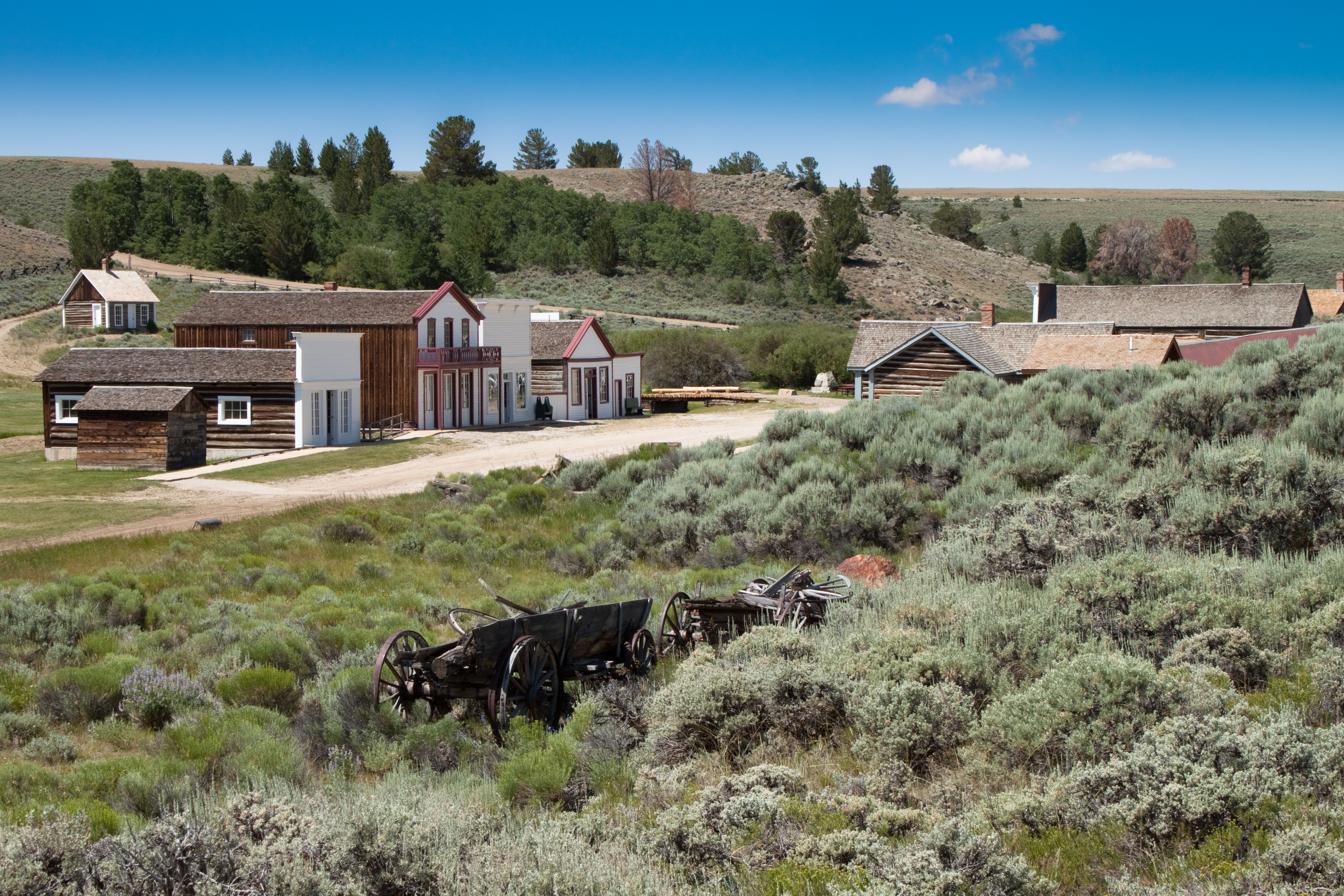
South Pass City in 2011

The dry, rocky landscape that confronted 55-year-old Morris as she stepped off the stage at South Pass City appeared startlingly different from the fertile landscape she had known in Illinois and New York. Instead, her new home at 7,500 feet (2,300 m) in elevation meant scratching out a living in a barren gulch at the mouth of canyon near the Continental Divide. The Morrises settled into a 24-foot-by-26-foot (7 × 9 m) log cabin with a sod roof that Esther's oldest son had purchased.

Winters were brutal. South Pass area residents, whose population swelled to nearly 4,000 residents, according to one estimate, either left the camp for the winter or faced extreme isolation during the long winters. Both John Morris and Archy purchased interest in mining properties soon after their arrival, including the Mountain Jack, Grand Turk, Golden State, and Nellie Morgan lodes, according to historian Michael A. Massie.

Initially, prospects looked good in the midst of the gold rush, where the mines and adjoining businesses of South Pass City spurred employment for 2,000 workers during 1868 and 1869, according to a Stanford University study. But then came the bust. By 1870 most miners had left, leaving as few as 460 residents. By 1875 fewer than 100 remained.

== Justice of the peace in South Pass City ==
Esther Morris had hardly settled in her new home in South Pass City when District Court Judge John W. Kingman appointed her as justice of the peace in 1870. It took some "prodding" but Morris subsequently completed an application for the post and submitted a required $500 bond. The Sweetwater County Board of Commissioners in a vote of two to one approved her application on February 14, 1870.

Subsequently, the county clerk telegraphed a press release announcing the historic event of the first woman justice of the peace. The Wyoming Territory's enfranchisement of women to vote in 1869 made Morris's unprecedented appointment possible. The clerk's telegraph to the world in part read:

Wyoming, the youngest and one of the richest Territories in the United States, gave equal rights to women in actions as well as words.

Morris's momentous appointment followed the resignation of Justice R. S. Barr, who quit in protest of the territorial legislature's passage of the women's suffrage amendment in December 1869. However, according to author Lynne Cheney writing in American Heritage, the county board appointed Morris to complete the term of Judge J. W. Stillman. Her appointment was challenged, but ultimately, her tenure was upheld.

Morris began her tenure as justice in South Pass City in 1870 by arresting Stillman, who refused to hand over his court docket. Ultimately, Morris dismissed her own case with a ruling that she as an interested party did not have the authority to arrest Stillman, according to author Lynne Cheney. Morris began anew with her own docket, holding court sitting on a wood slab in the living room of her log cabin. Cheney notes:

When the lawyers who appeared in her court tried to embarrass her with legal terms and technicalities, she admitted her lack of training but was quick to let them know just whose court they were in. One of the lawyers who practiced before her recalled that to pettifoggers, she showed no mercy.

Morris looked to her sons for support in the courtroom. She appointed Archibald as district clerk and Robert as a part-time deputy clerk with the tasks of keeping court records and drawing up arrest warrants. Her husband John's support was not so forthcoming. John actively opposed his wife's appointment and reportedly made such a scene in her court that Esther had him jailed.

Judge Morris decided approximately 70 cases during her more than eight months in office, including nine criminal cases. Just two of Morris's rulings were appealed, but both were affirmed by the appellate court according to records at the Wyoming State Archives. She held her justice of the peace post until the term that she had been appointed to fill expired on December 6, 1870. Morris sought reelection but failed to muster a nomination from either the Republican or Democratic parties.

Morris's historic judgeship garnered favorable review upon the completion of her term in the South Pass News, as her son Archy was the editor. However, the historical record reveals little fanfare in the remainder of Wyoming's press. The Wyoming Tribune, published in Cheyenne, did note the comments of Territorial Secretary Lee: "the people of Sweetwater County had not the good sense and judgment to nominate and elect her for the ensuing term."

== The boom goes bust ==
Esther Morris, as a working mother, held court over a camp of miners, gamblers, speculators, business owners, prostitutes, and rounders. Men outnumbered women 4 to 1 in the mountain community where she lived. The challenges in the court dealing with a rough constituency were compounded by her husband, John, who had a reputation as "a brawler, an idler, and a drunk." Morris had him arrested, after her term in office was over, for assault and battery, according to the American Heritage magazine.

Troubles continued to mount for the family. An 1871 fire struck the South Pass City newspaper office owned and operated by Esther Morris's son, Archibald Slack, forcing him and his wife Sarah to move to Laramie in Albany County. Shortly after her son's departure and a particularly bad winter in 1871–72, Morris left her husband and the camp. Morris traveled to Laramie, where she briefly lived with her son Archy; however, the former judge remained unsettled. She moved to Albany, New York, then to Springfield, Illinois, where she spent her winters, according to Massie. Summers saw her returning to Wyoming, where she spent time with her sons. Morris's wandering ended in the 1880s when she returned to Cheyenne to live with her son Robert.

Morris had been but one of many in a long history of residents who saddled up and called it quits in South Pass City. Short-lived gold strikes in the 1880s, 1890s, and 1930s once again lured miners back to the mountains seeking their fortunes.

== Life after the mines ==
After Wyoming's enactment of women's suffrage in 1869, the territory's appointment of Morris as the first woman justice of the peace in the United States in 1870, and the first woman to hold judicial office in the modern world, drew widespread national attention.

Morris's involvement in women's causes also continued after she left the gold mines and South Pass City:

- February 1872: She participated in the American Woman Suffrage Association Convention in San Francisco.
- August 1873: Nominated by the Woman's Party of Wyoming as a candidate to the Wyoming Territorial Legislature, a nomination that Morris declined.
- 1876: Served as vice president, National American Woman Suffrage Association.
- July 1876: Addressed the National Suffrage Convention in Philadelphia.
- July 1890: Presented the new Wyoming state flag to Governor Warren during the Wyoming statehood celebration.
- 1896: Attended as a delegate to the Republican National Convention in St. Louis, Missouri, which nominated the William McKinley-Garret A. Hobart ticket. (She was not related to Vice President Hobart, who died in office in 1899.)

== Death and legacy ==
Esther Hobart Morris died in Cheyenne on April 2, 1902. Since 1960, a statue of her sculpted by Avard Fairbanks has been one of Wyoming's two statues in the National Statuary Hall Collection in the United States Capitol. Another statue stands at the Wyoming State Capitol. In 2018, The New York Times wrote a belated obituary for her.

=== Role in women's suffrage ===
Evidence suggests that the public record celebrating Morris's role as a suffrage leader is largely fabrication. Reports of Morris as suffragist in South Pass City, where she was said to have hosted a momentous tea party for the electors and candidates for Wyoming's first territorial legislature, are not supported by any contemporary accounts, and only appear nearly fifty years after the fact.

For many years, Esther Hobart Morris has been celebrated as the "Mother of Woman Suffrage". The legislation had been written a year before she became a justice of the peace, by Civil War veteran and South Pass City resident William H. Bright.

Many commenters opposing the women's suffrage movement viewed Morris's appointment as a "dangerous" sign of things to come. Some newspaper columns even opined that more women holding office would cause women to become a "third sex" and unsettle gender expectations. On the other side of the debate, suffragists often pointed to Morris's appointment as evidence of women's ability to hold office.

Melville C. Brown's recollection of the 1889 Constitutional Convention

Some modern-day researchers have suggested that Morris's oldest son, who became editor of a Cheyenne newspaper, may have played a role in the origins of the story of his mother's role. Critics say that he "concocted it". Other research leads to Morris's friend Melville C. Brown, who was president of the 1889 Constitutional Convention in Cheyenne, who claimed that she had presented the suffrage bill to the legislature. Morris's son Archy Slack followed suit and subsequently referred to his mother in the Cheyenne Sun newspaper as the "Mother of Suffrage".

H.G. Nickerson's recollection of a tea party

The tea party story might have faded quietly were it not for Captain H.G. Nickerson. Nickerson, who had discovered and opened the Bullion Mine in 1868, later served as a territorial legislator for Lander. He wrote a letter published on February 14, 1919 in Wyoming State Journal, in which he recounted the tea party and his attendance as a legislative candidate, some 50 years after the event had taken place. In a tip of the hat honoring Morris, Nickerson notes:

To Mrs. Esther Morris is due the credit and honor of advocating and originating woman's suffrage in the United States.

Nickerson's story gained widespread prominence after his friend, Wyoming historian Grace Raymond Hebard (1861–1936) published the account in a 1920 pamphlet entitled "How Woman Suffrage Came to Wyoming (1869)". The pamphlet eventually became so widely distributed that students throughout the state's public schools read the story memorializing Morris's suffrage feats. Hebard spent many years advancing the claim, promoting Morris as an instigator and co-author of Wyoming's suffrage legislation.

=== Statues at the capitol buildings in Cheyenne and Washington, D.C. ===
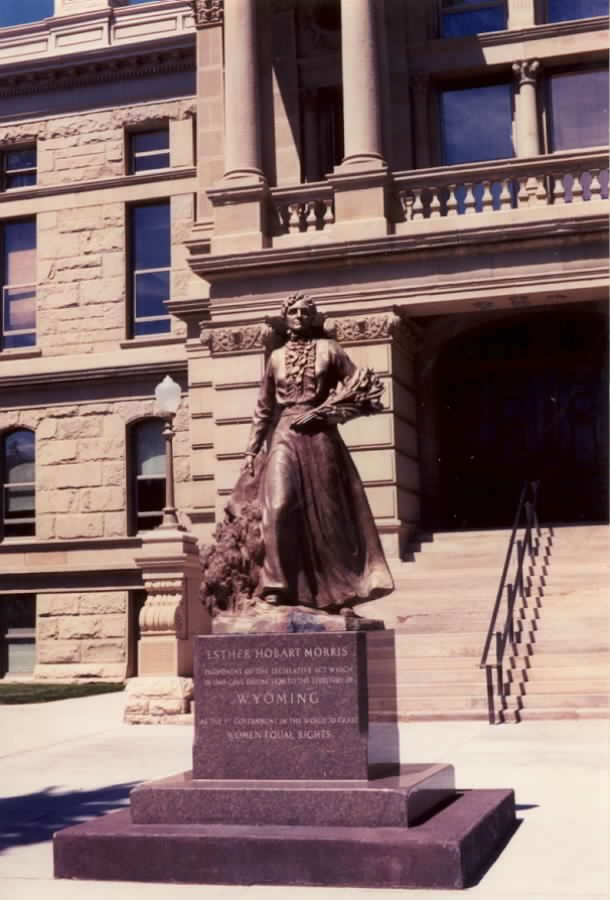
Wyoming State Capitol Building in Cheyenne. State officials in 1960 presented a copy of this 1953 bronze statue of Esther Hobart Morris for display at the U.S. Capitol's National Statuary Hall Collection in Washington, D.C.

In 1960, Wyoming further celebrated Morris as a key impetus of Wyoming suffrage by donating a life-sized bronze statue of her to the National Statuary Hall Collection in the rotunda of the U.S. Capitol in Washington, D.C. Officiating at the Statuary Hall ceremony were Vice President Richard M. Nixon and Richard Arnold Mullens (1918–2010), the president at the time of the Wyoming State Society.

In 1963, Wyoming officials placed a replica of the same 9 foot sculpture at the state capitol building in Cheyenne. An inscription thereon hails Morris as the "Mother of Woman Suffrage". In 2006, the National Cowgirl Museum and Hall of Fame in Fort Worth, Texas, inducted Morris, as a suffrage pathbreaker. The Cowgirl Hall of Fame claims that her "influential efforts made it possible for women to vote in the Wyoming Territory in 1869."

=== On Death Valley Days ===
Actress Bethel Leslie portrayed Morris in an episode of the television anthology series Death Valley Days titled "A Woman's Rights" that aired on May 1, 1960.

=== Hall of fame ===
In 1973, she was inducted into the Hall of Great Westerners of the National Cowboy & Western Heritage Museum.

== See also ==
- History of feminism
- List of suffragists and suffragettes
- List of women's rights activists
- Timeline of women's suffrage
- Grace Raymond Hebard
- South Pass City, Wyoming
