= 9th Wyoming Territorial Legislature =

←	8th	10th	→
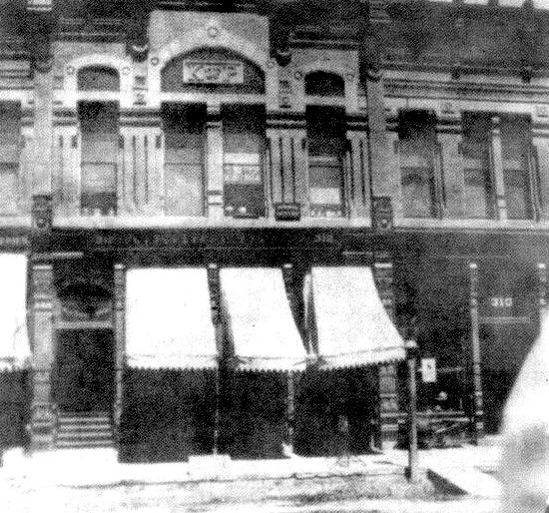
- Knights of Pythias Hall, in 1900, where the Council and House of Representatives convened

Overview
- Legislative body: Wyoming Legislature
- Jurisdiction: Wyoming Territory, United States
- Meeting place: Knights of Pythias Hall
- Term: 1886–1888

Wyoming Council
- Members: 12 Senators
- President of the Council: J. W. Blake
- Party control: Democratic

Wyoming House of Representatives
- Members: 24 Representatives
- Speaker of the House: John S. Kerr
- Party control: Republican

The 9th Wyoming Territorial Legislature was a former meeting of the Wyoming Legislature that lasted from January 12, to March 12, 1886.

== History ==
=== Formation ===
The 1885 elections held for the 9th Wyoming Territorial Legislature were contested through the legality of the elections, but the United States Congress and President Grover Cleveland passed legislation on January 19, 1886, legalizing the elections that were held in Wyoming. John S. Kerr was selected to serve as Speaker of the House of Representatives and J. W. Blake was selected to serve as President of the Council.

=== Legislation ===
The territorial legislature passed legislation allocating $150,000 for the creation of a state capitol building. The legislature also passed a bill organizing Niobrara and Fetterman counties, however, Fetterman County would never be formed and Niobrara County wouldn't be formed until 1911.

== Membership ==
=== Council ===
Affiliation	Party (Shading indicates majority caucus)			Total	
Affiliation	Democratic	Republican	Populist	Total	Vacant
Beginning of 9th Legislature	8	4	0	12	0
Latest voting share	66.67%	33.33%	0%		

=== Members of the Wyoming Council ===
Representative	Party	Residence	Counties represented
J. W. Blake		Laramie	Albany
Joseph E. Cashin		Evanston	Uinta
A. T. Chalice		Rock Springs	Sweetwater
William Dailey		Rawlins	Carbon
Charles Deloney		Evanston	Uinta
J. H. Ford		Evanston	Laramie
Joseph Grainger		Cheyenne	Laramie
Leroy Grant		Laramie	Albany
John McCormick		Big Horn	Johnson
A. S. Peabody		Laramie	Albany
H. E. Tescheniacher		Cheyenne	Laramie
C. W. Wright		Cheyenne	Laramie

=== House of Representatives ===
Affiliation	Party (Shading indicates majority caucus)			Total	
Affiliation	Republican	Democratic	Populist	Total	Vacant
Beginning of 9th Legislature	14	9	1	24	0
Latest voting share	58.33%	37.50%	4.17%		

=== Members of the Wyoming House of Representatives ===
Representative	Party	Residence	Counties represented
C. H. Bussey		Rock Springs	Sweetwater
D. B. Dole		Laramie	Albany
S. W. Downey		Laramie	Albany
E. W. Genter		Rawlins	Carbon
C. A. Guernsey		Hat Creek	Laramie
M. P. Keefe		Cheyenne	Laramie
John S. Kerr		Carbon	Carbon
A. D. Kelley		Cheyenne	Laramie
James Kime		Miner's Delight	Fremont
N. M. Knight		Tie Siding	Albany
J. M. Lobban		Buffalo	Johnson
John A. Matthews		Dixon	Carbon
Frank A. Miller		Cheyenne	Laramie
George Mitchell		Cheyenne	Laramie
N. J. O'Brien		Cheyenne	Laramie
W. A. Robins		Cheyenne	Laramie
John L. Russell		Almy	Uinta
R. B. Seaton		Evanston	Uinta
William Simmons		Burnt Fork	Uinta
Addison Terrell		Laramie	Albany
J. M. Tompkins		Cheyenne	Laramie
M. M. Towne		Laramie	Albany
Isaiah Whitehouse		Rock Springs	Sweetwater
Frank Williams		Saratoga	Carbon
