= Woods Landing Dance Hall =

- U.S. National Register of Historic Places
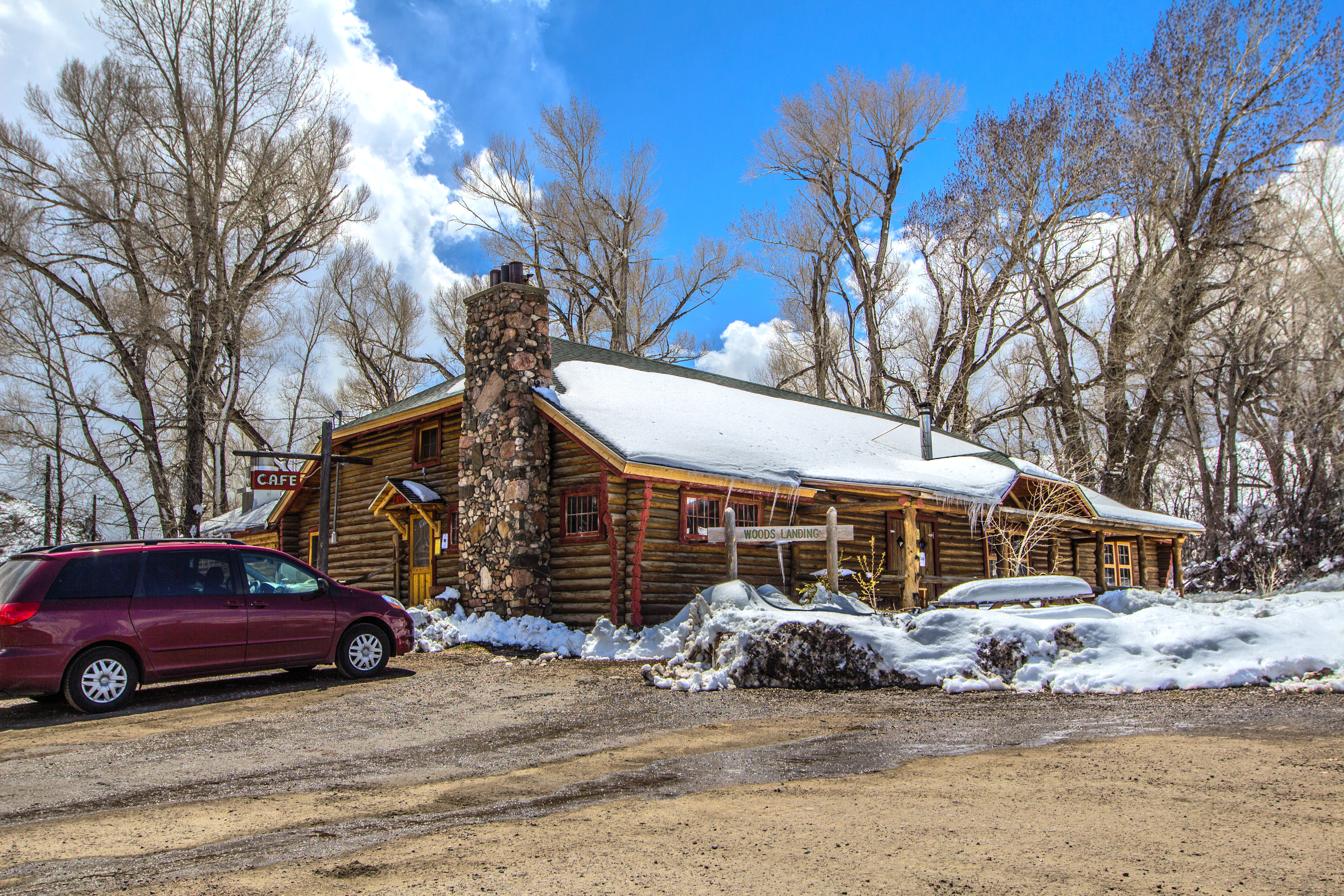

- Location within Wyoming
- Location: 2731 WY 230; Woods Landing, Wyoming
- Coordinates: 41°6′37″N 106°0′44″W
- Area: less than one acre
- Built: 1932
- Architect: Lestum, Hokum
- NRHP reference No.: 85003210
- Added to NRHP: December 13, 1985

The Woods Landing Dance Hall was built in 1927 by Hokum Lestum for Mayme and Clarence Lewellen near Woods Landing, Wyoming. The site had previously been the Woods Landing Saloon, established by Colonel Samuel Wood in 1883. After the death of Clarence in 1936, Mayme married Hokum and they operated the dance hall and cafe until the death of Hokum in 1970. Mayme continued to operate it until the 1980s.

The dance hall is of primarily log construction with an open log-truss roof. It measures about 40 feet (12 m) by 67.5 feet (20.6 m) on a stone and concrete foundation. The logs are shaped to fit closely, without chinking. The roof is a clipped gable, with a porch extension to the front over the large double entry doors. The dance floor was designed to float on 24 box car springs to optimize it for rhythmic group dancing.

The Woods Landing Dance Hall was placed on the National Register of Historic Places on December 13, 1985. It continues to operate as part of the Woods Landing Resort.
