= Agnes Wright Spring =

American journalist and historian

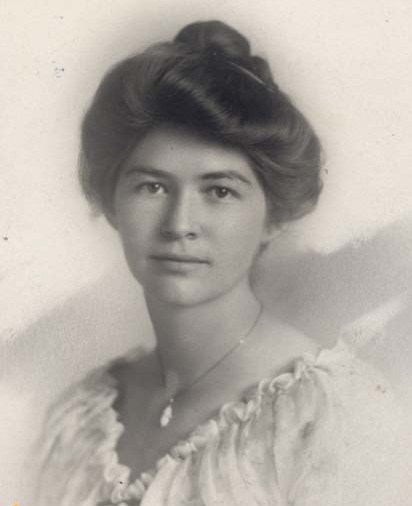
Agnes Wright Spring

Agnes Wright Spring (January 5, 1894 – March 20, 1988) was a journalist, writer and historian from Wyoming who wrote books focusing on Wyoming and Western history.

== Biography ==
Wright was born on January 5, 1894, in Delta, Colorado, the daughter of Gordon L. Wright. In 1901 the family moved to a ranch on the Little Laramie River, Wyoming.

In 1913 Wright was the first woman to graduate with a civil engineering degree from the University of Wyoming. She was also the first woman editor of The Wyoming Student. She attended Pulitzer School of Journalism at Columbia University.

She was a journalist, the editor of The Arrow, the national organ of Pi Beta Phi fraternity. She was State Librarian of Wyoming from 1917 to 1921 and State Historian of Wyoming, ex-officio, from 1917 to 1919. She was an assistant Librarian for the Wyoming Supreme Court. She was superintendent of weights and measures. She resigned in 1921 to marry Archer T. Spring (d. 1967) and lived at Fort Collins, Colorado. In the 1920s she worked at the Pi Beta Phi settlement school in Gatlinburg, Tennessee.

Wright was editor of two departments of Wyoming Stockman-Farmer. She was contributor to Sunset Magazine and A Child's Garden and other periodicals. Spring wrote over 500 articles and 22 books on the Rocky Mountain West.

She was a member of: Daughters of the American Revolution, Fort Collins Woman's Club, Fort Collins Country Club, Quill Club, Pi Beta Phi.

In the 1930s she lived in a fruit orchard named Cherryhurst in Colorado. During World War II, from 1935 to 1941, she served as the director of the Wyoming Federal Writer’s Project. In 1941 she became a research assistant at the Denver Public Library. In 1950 she became president of the Colorado Historical Society and also served as Colorado State Historian from 1954 to 1963. She achieved the goal to be the only person, man or woman, to serve as the official state historian of two states, Wyoming and Colorado.

In 1970 she appeared in the Documentary The Last of the Westerners, directed by David A. Tapper.

In 1983 she was inducted into the Cowgirl Hall of Fame and Museum.

She died on March 20, 1988, in Fort Collins, Colorado.

The Agnes Wright Spring, 1894-1988, Papers are preserved at the University of Wyoming, American Heritage Center.

In 2022, she was inducted into the Colorado Women's Hall of Fame.

== Works ==
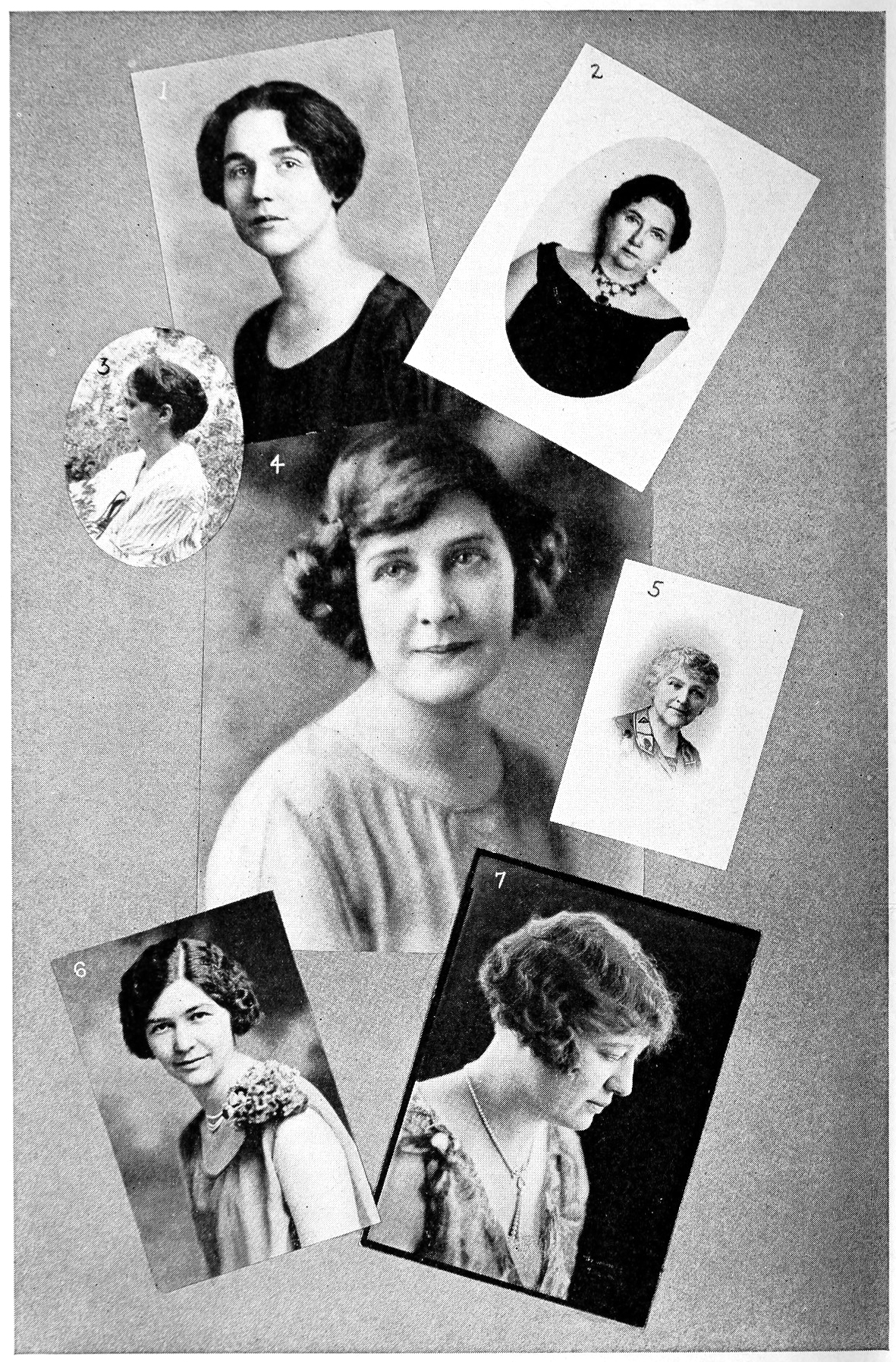
A Few of the Eminent Women of Colorado, Margaret Tod Ritter, Virginia D. McClurg, Christine Whiting Parmenter, Lillian White Spencer, Nona L. Brooks, Agnes Wright Spring, Millicent H. Velhagen

- The Arrow of Pi Beta Phi: official organ of the Pi Beta Phi fraternity: history number, 1867-1936 (1936)
- The better-half of the west (1951)
- A bloomer girl on Pike's Peak, 1858: Julia Archibald Holmes, first white woman to climb Pike's Peak
- Boggs scrapbook (1955)
- The bonanza West: The Story of the Western Mining Rushes, 1848-1900
- Boots and Saddles or, Life in Dakota with General Custer
- Buffalo Bill and his horses (1968)
- The Canyon Springs Robbery (1968)
- Caspar Collins: the life and exploits of an Indian fighter of the sixties (1927)
- The Cattlemen: From the Rio Grande across the Far Marias
- The Cheyenne and Black Hills Stage and Express Routes (1948)
- The Cheyenne Club, Mecca of the aristocrats of the old-time cattle range (1961)
- Cheyenne Girl and White Man's Ways (1970)
- Colonel Tim McCoy (1972)
- Colorado Charley, Wild Bill's Pard (1968)
- Colorado Gold Rush Songs
- Colorado in the Civil War (1976)
- Cow Country legacies (1976)
- The Day They Killed the Judge (1967)
- Denver's historic markers, memorials, statues and parks (1959)
- The Denver Westerners Roundup
- Did Edison Get "Turned On" In Wyoming? (1968)
- Dude Wrangler, Hunter, Line Rider (1964)
- "Escorting" Sheep from California To Montana (1976)
- Expressions and words used in the West in pioneer days
- The First National Bank of Denver: the formative years, 1860-1865 (1960)
- Good Little Bad Man: The Life of Colorado Charley Utter (1968)
- Grand Encampment, Carbon County, Wyoming claims
- The Gum Shoe Kid (1971)
- Historical notes from files of the Cheyenne state leader (1867-1890)
- A Hunch About That Yellow Stuff (1974)
- An Indian Fight in Jackson Hole (1967)
- Let Diamond Cut Diamond (1969)
- Library laws of the State of Wyoming (1919)
- Lightning Stealers (1968)
- The Matador Land and Cattle Company
- Midas of the Mountains (1968)
- Near the Greats (1981)
- Nuggets (1970)
- Old Sharpy of Buzzard Roost Ranch (1967)
- Old-Time Cattlemen and Other Pioneers of the Anza-Borrego Area
- Over Wyoming
- Paintings and pen sketches relive the days of Charley Russell (1946)
- A Pioneer Woman's Work (1966)
- Pioneer Years in the Black Hills (1957)
- A place in Wyoming worthy of a monument, South Pass (1931)
- The price of justice. A comedy-drama in three acts (1928)
- Prince of Packers (1970)
- Read about railroads: a selective bibliography
- Robbing Montana Mails (1965)
- The rowdy west (1959)
- Samuel Mallory
- The settlement school on Little Pigeon (1936)
- Seventy years: a panoramic history of the Wyoming Stock Growers Association, interwoven with data relative to the cattle industry in Wyoming (1942)
- Some People of Old-Time Wyoming (1977)
- Sound (1989)
- Tentative list of markers, plaques, monuments, memorial, and statues in Colorado (1953)
- The territory guarded chiefly by Ohio troops, 1862-1865
- Theodore Roosevelt in Colorado (1958)
- Touring the West, circa 1860
- The Travels of Sam Mallory
- Twenty Notches On His Gun (1970)
- When the Last Trumpet Sounds (1970)
- Who Robbed the Mail Coach? (1967)
- Wild Old Days (1973)
- William Chapin Deming of Wyoming: pioneer publisher, and state and federal official: a biography (1944)
- "Yellow Kid" and the Wisdom Tooth (1969)
