= Robert H. Homer =

American politician

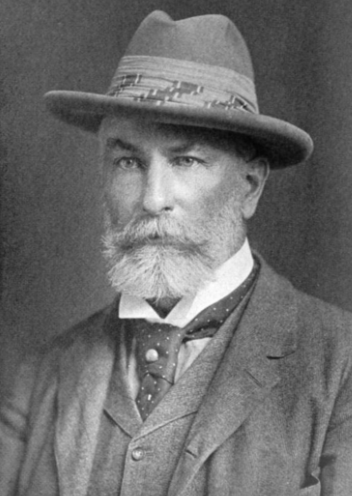

Personal details
- Born: May 16, 1849 Boston, Massachusetts, U.S.
- Died: October 13, 1927 (aged 78) San Diego, California, U.S.
- Party: Democratic
- Spouse: Belle Stuart White
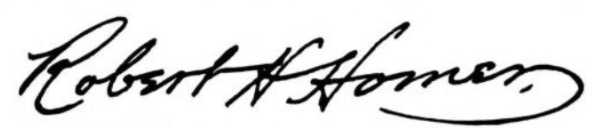
- Signature

Robert H. Homer (May 16, 1849 – October 13, 1927) was an American politician who served in Wyoming's Territorial legislature as a Democrat.

== Life ==
Robert H. Homer was born in Boston, Massachusetts, to Peter Thatcher Homer and Caroline Bunker on May 16, 1849. He went to public schools and then entered the dry good business from 1868 to 1871. In 1871, he visited France during the Franco-Prussian War and after returning from Europe moved to the Wyoming Territory. In 1874, he helped found the Laramie National Bank and served as its director until 1893 and then worked for the Wyoming National Bank in Laramie until 1895. In 1901, he became president of the Albany County National Bank and served until his death.

From 1877 to 1879, he serve in the Wyoming Territorial Legislature and again in 1883. In 1892, he represented Wyoming on the Notification Committee at the Democratic National Convention.

On February 26, 1888, he married Belle Stuart White in Providence, Rhode Island. In 1900, he served as a national commissioner at the Paris World's Fair. In 1904, he was appointed by Governor DeForest Richards onto a commission for Wyoming's exhibit to the 1904 World's Fair and was later elected as president of the commission.

On October 13, 1927, he died in San Diego, California.
