= Abraham Lincoln Memorial Monument =

Bust of Lincoln by Robert Russin in Laramie, Wyoming, United States

Lincoln Monument
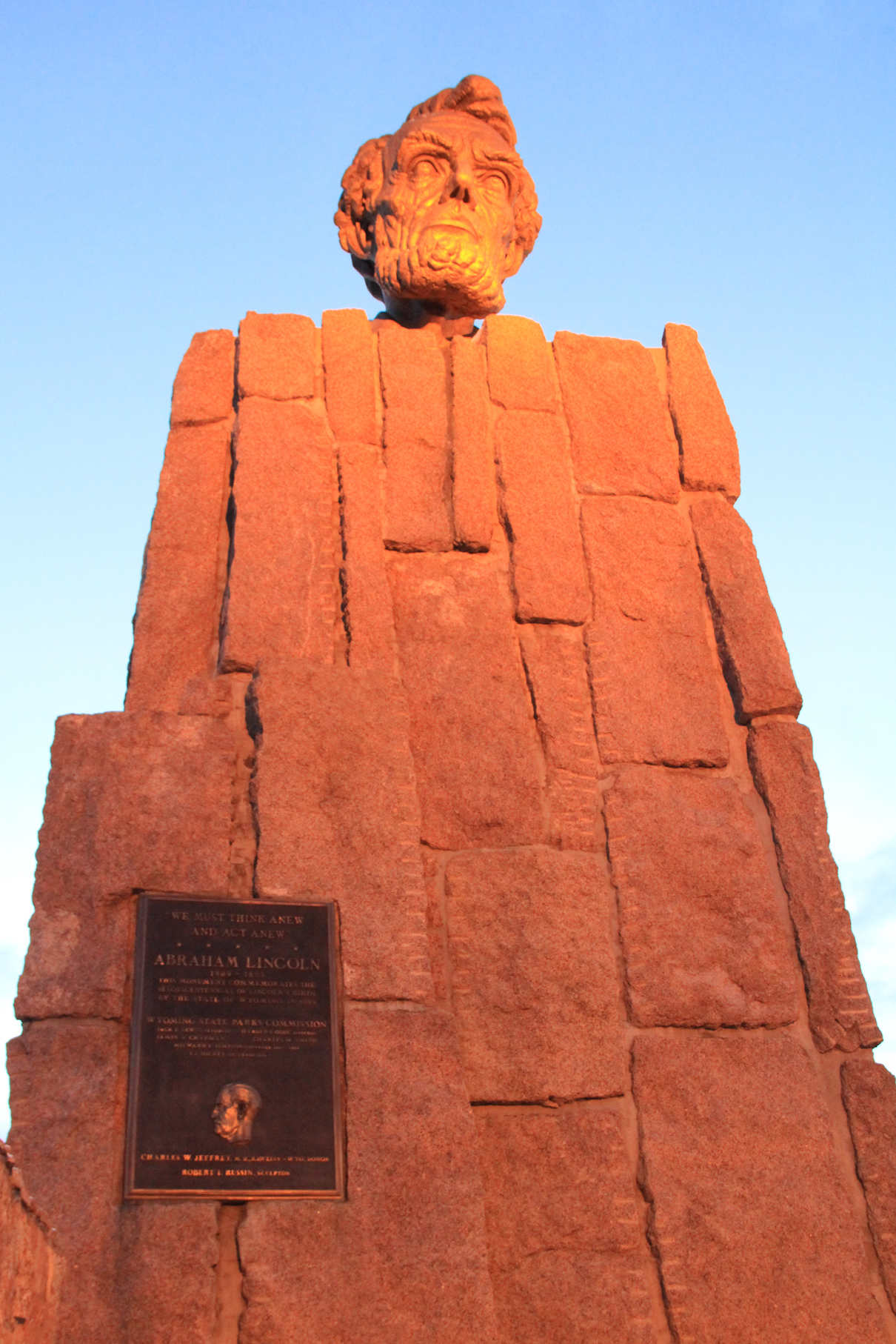
- Interactive map of Lincoln Monument
- 41°14′13″N 105°26′11″W
- Location: Laramie, Wyoming

History
- Established: 1959

Site notes
- Visitors: 200,000 (in 2013)

The Lincoln Monument is a bust of Abraham Lincoln by Robert Russin, 12 1/2 feet (3.8 m) high and resting on a 30-foot-tall (9.1 m) granite pedestal, at the Summit Rest Area on Interstate 80 east of Laramie, Wyoming. Russin originally erected the sculpture in 1959 nearby on Sherman Hill, overlooking the old U.S. Highway 30 (Lincoln Highway). In 1969, after Interstate 80 was built, state officials moved the monument to become a centerpiece at the Summit Rest Area and Visitor Center between the cities of Cheyenne and Laramie.

== History ==
The construction of Lincoln's bust began more than a decade earlier and thousands of miles to the south of Sherman Hill and the Summit Rest Area. Russin decided when planning the sculpture that the wild temperature swings of the Wyoming plains would not provide the stable environment that he needed to craft the Lincoln sculpture. Instead, he turned to Fundicion Artística, S. A. in Mexico City. Russin built the 4,500-pound bronze bust in Mexico during a period of 11 months using some 10 tons of clay in a lost-wax process of casting. Russin cast Lincoln's monumental bust in more than 30 bronze pieces designed to be bolted together. He then shipped the sculpture from Mexico to Laramie. The first leg of the 1958 shipment featured rail travel to Denver, Colorado.

"The statue came up from Mexico with armed guards from the Mexican Army, because they were afraid that someone was going to steal it", said the late sculptor's son, Joe Russin, in an interview for the Laramie Boomerang. The Lincoln bust was transported north from Denver to Laramie by truck. All went well until the truck reached Laramie. Joe Russin recalls: "My dad hadn't thought about how low the wires were over Grand Avenue. So they had to move it through Laramie really early in the morning and they cut the electric and telephone wires for each block as they went through."

The Wyoming Parks Commission dedicated the Lincoln Monument in 1959 to commemorate Lincoln's 150th birthday. Originally the bust was located at the highest point on the Lincoln highway from New York to San Francisco. "The grandeur of the landscape recalls the nobility of his soul," Russin wrote referencing President Abraham Lincoln. The bust was transferred to its present location beside interstate 80 after that highway was finished in 1969. An estimated 200,000 travelers view the monumental sculpture annually. The monument was listed on the National Register of Historic Places (NRHP) in 2026. The Henry B. Joy Monument, also listed on the NRHP, was erected in 1938 on old highway 30. It was moved to the Summit Rest Area in 2001, which is also called the Sherman Summit Rest Area, or Lincoln Summit Rest Area (Exit 323).

== Gallery ==
Lincoln Monument
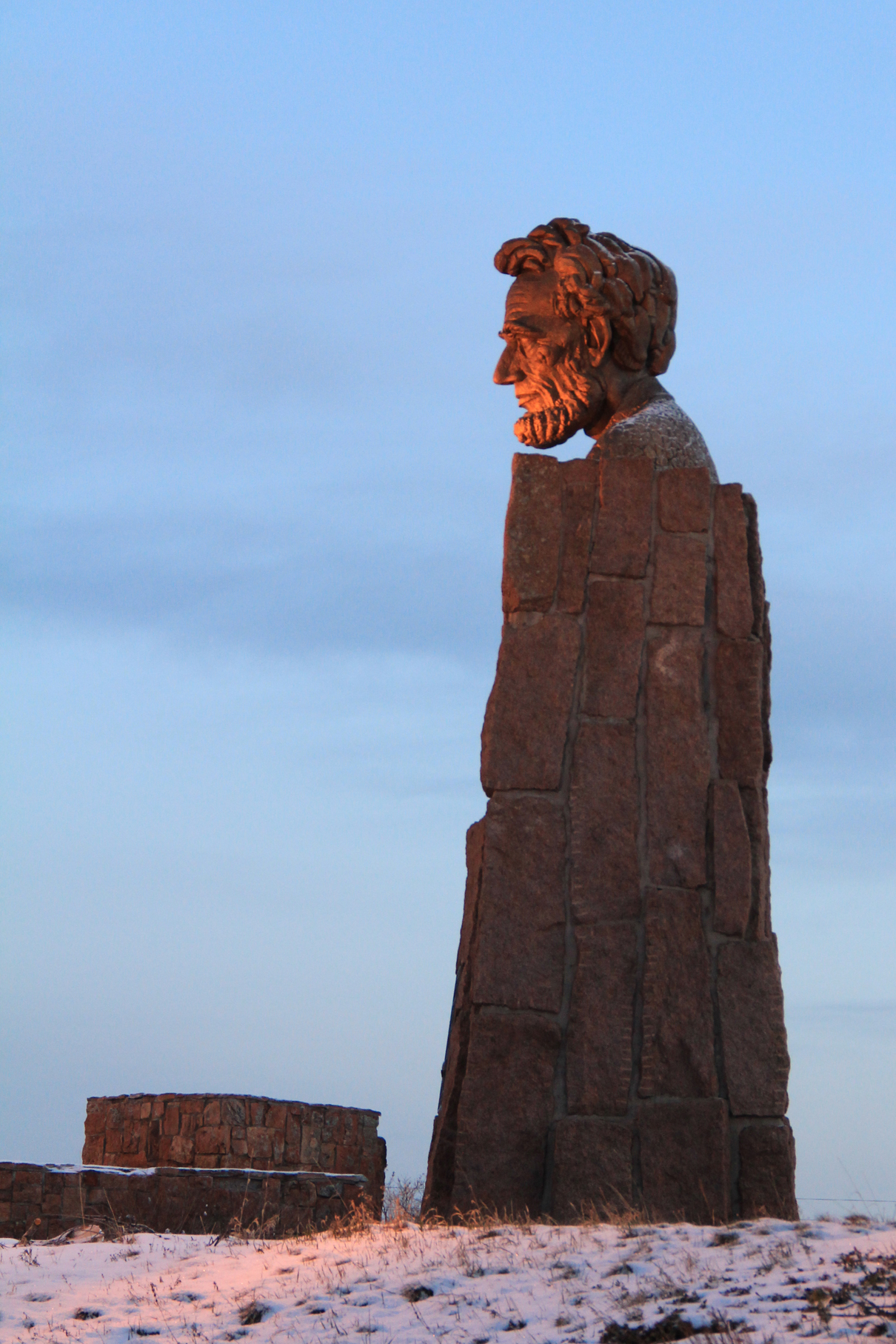
Profile of the Lincoln Monument

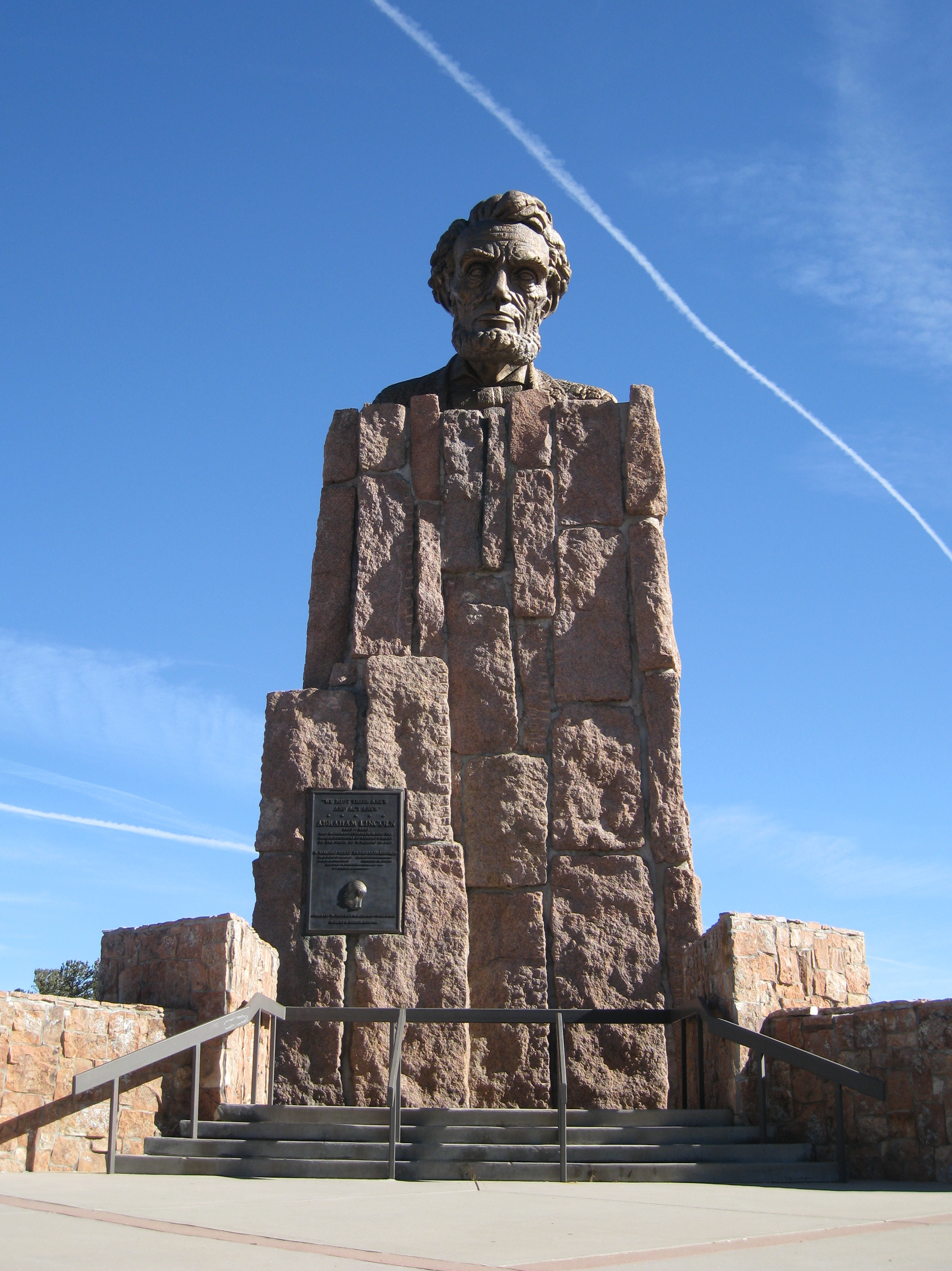
Front of Lincoln Monument

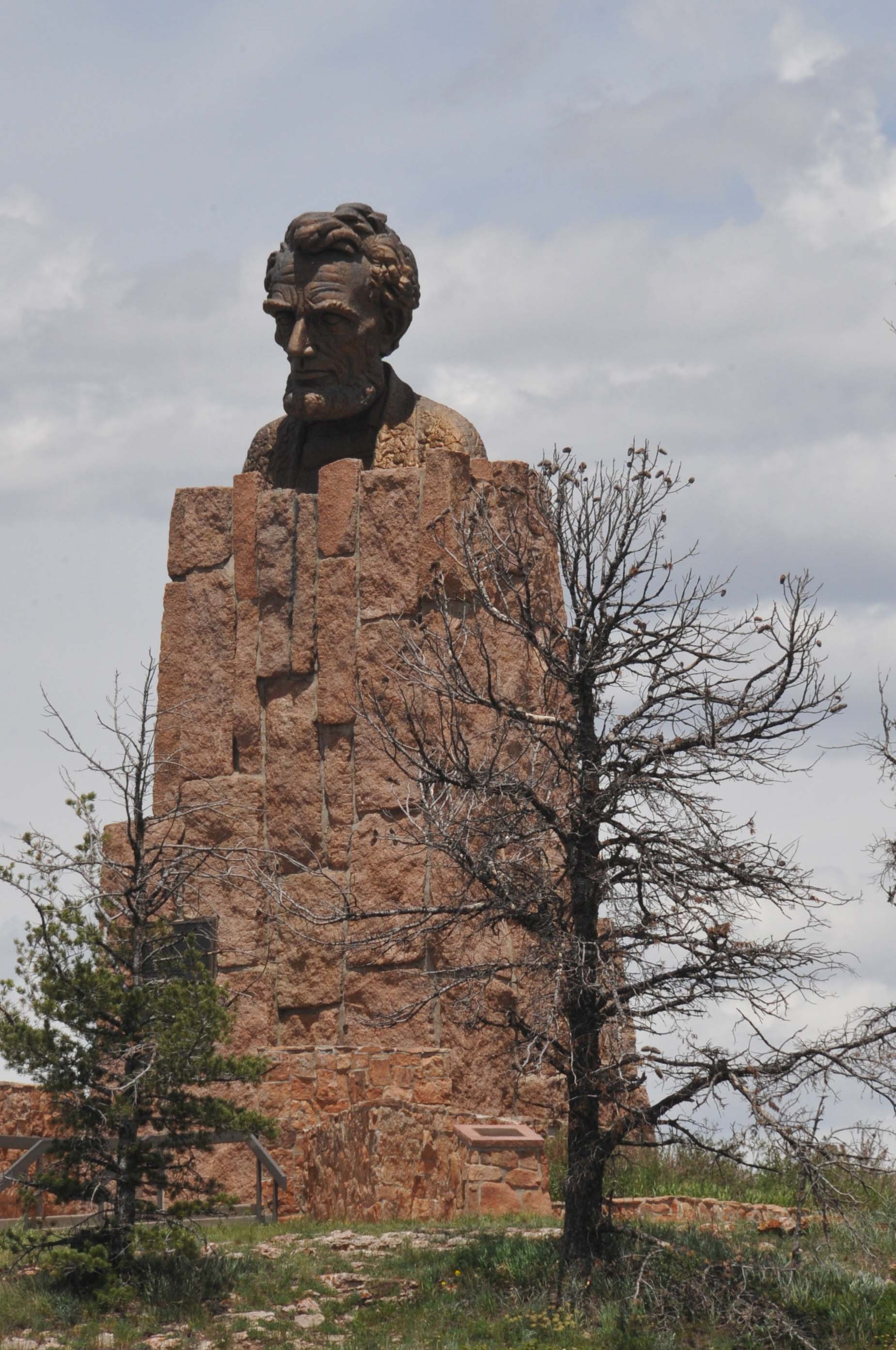
Front of Lincoln Monument

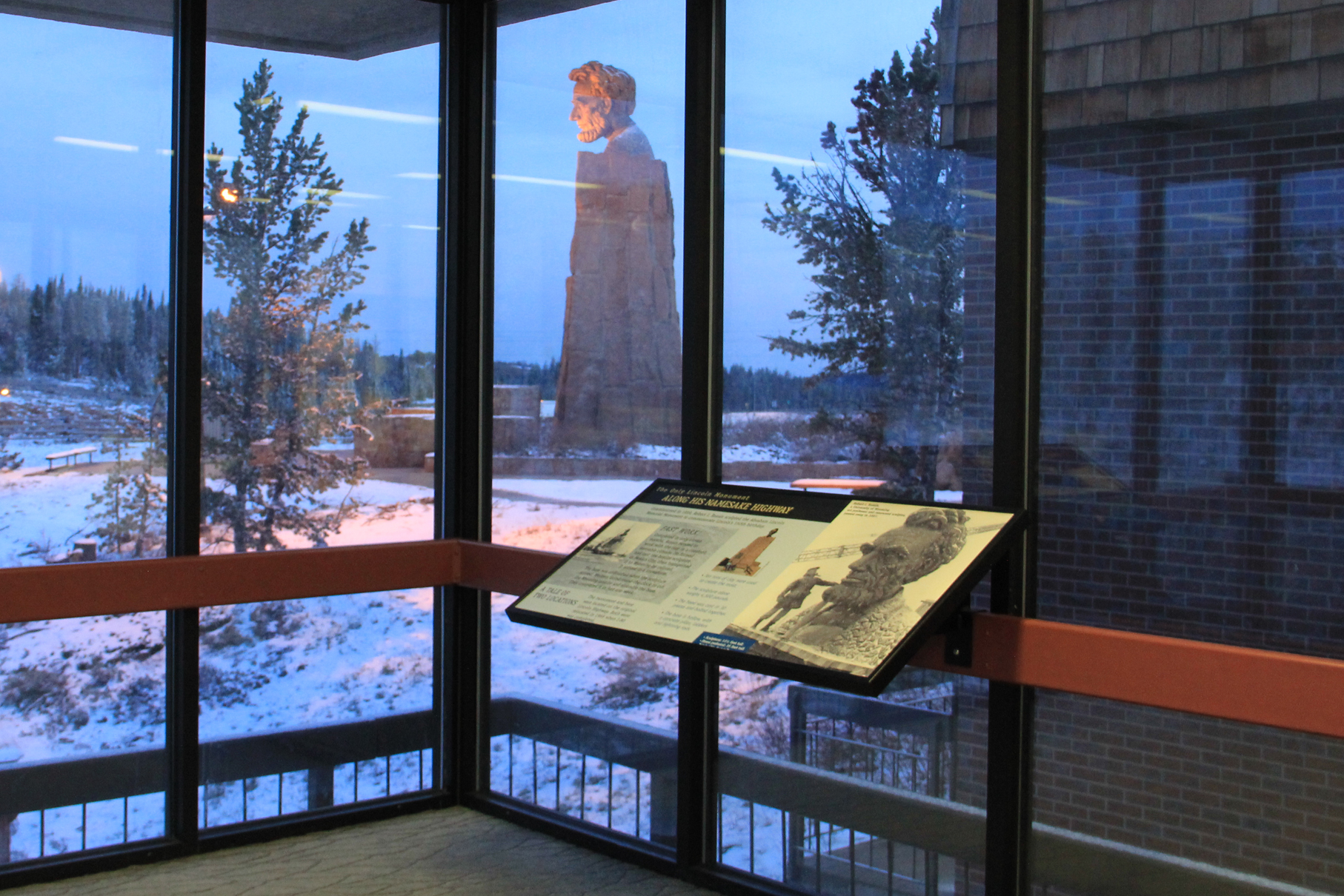
Lincoln Monument from the Summit Information Center.

== See also ==
- National Register of Historic Places listings in Albany County, Wyoming
