= Robert Russin =

American artist

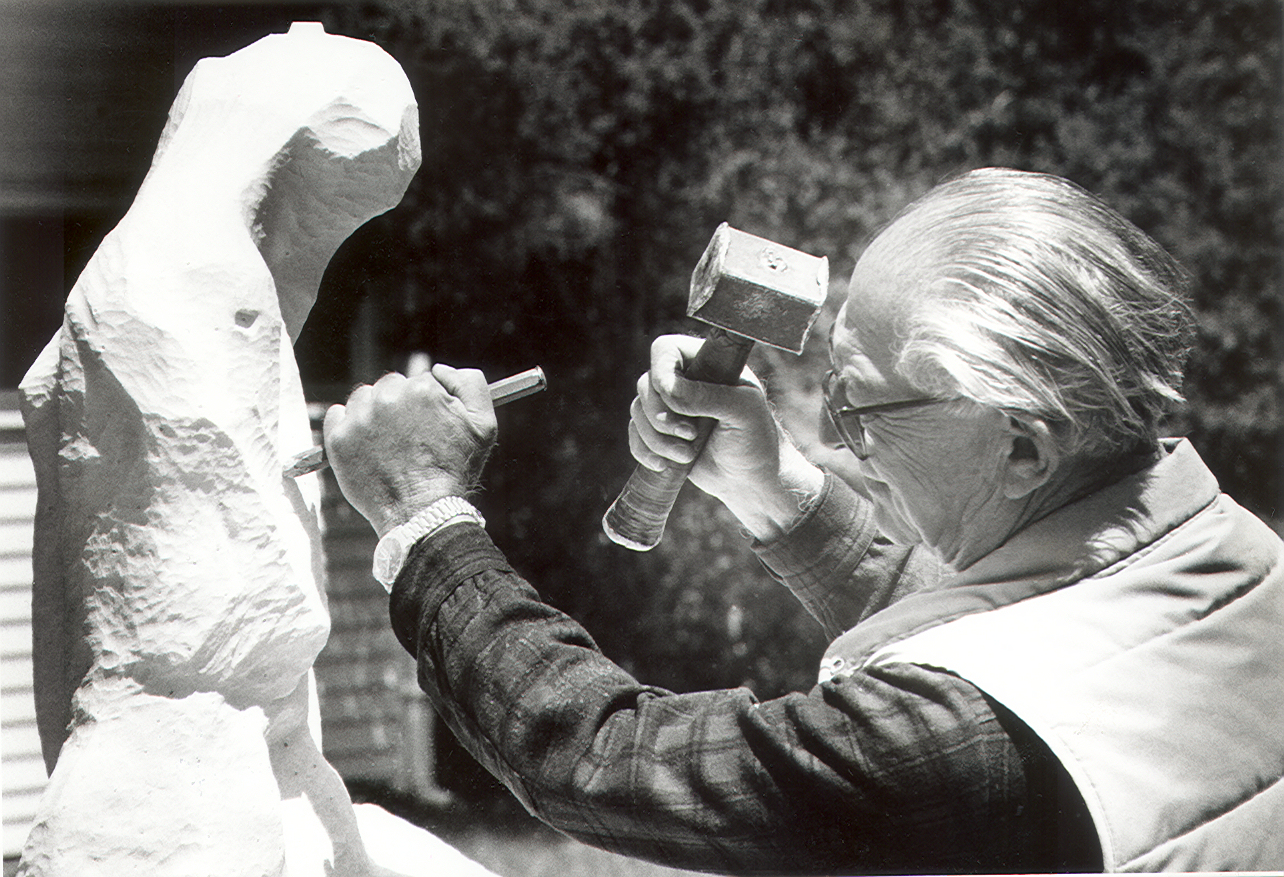
Robert Russin's sculptures are found internationally, including in his home state of Wyoming.

Robert Isaiah Russin (August 26, 1914 - December 13, 2007) was an American sculptor, artist and University of Wyoming professor. He was best known for a number of public sculptures throughout the United States, including the "Spirit of Life" fountain sculpture located at the City of Hope National Medical Center in California and a giant bust of Abraham Lincoln, the Abraham Lincoln Memorial Monument, located on I-80 in Wyoming.

== Early life ==
Robert Russin was born in New York City on August 26, 1914. He received both his bachelor's degree and master's degree from the City College of New York. Russin briefly taught at Cooper Union in Manhattan. He won two federal sculpture competitions by the age of 25. Inspiration that he found in the state and family health reasons prompted him to move to Wyoming in his mid-thirties. He accepted a teaching position in 1947 at the University of Wyoming. Russin remained at UW's Department of Art for nearly 40 years and continued to reside in Wyoming for 60 years. He was also the university's artist in residence for nearly 10 years. Russin maintained several residences, including one in Centennial, Wyoming; in the foothills of the Snowy Range and another in Green Valley, Arizona, where he lived during the winter.

== Sculpture ==
Russin was known for his public sculptures, by one account numbering more than 400 worldwide. His works include bronze figurative sculptures. Russin struck his hammer and chisel to stone, including marble, for abstract expressions.

He won his first major commission in 1938 for two monumental bas-reliefs at the post office in Evanston, Illinois. His sculpting skills garnered increased recognition, including a Ford Foundation Fellowship to work in Italy and study the Renaissance masters. The New York native continued to return to Italy during his life to "work on projects in the marble yards and foundries there." Perhaps his best known work is a massive bronze bust of Abraham Lincoln, called the Abraham Lincoln Memorial Monument, which was originally dedicated in 1959 at the highest point on the Lincoln Highway in Wyoming. Other roadside art includes his "The Greeting and the Gift" at the visitors' center south of Cheyenne.

Casper, Wyoming is home to other major outdoor works by Russin, including "Fountainhead" (City Hall); "Man and Energy" (Chamber of Commerce); and "Prometheus" (Casper Public Library). Russin also won a commission to create the "Spirit of Life" fountain at the City of Hope National Medical Center in Duarte, California, which was officially dedicated in 1967. The "Spirit of Life", which took Russin a year and a half to create, is cast in bronze. The raised sculpture, which depicts two individuals, rests in three basins made of a type of Italian marble called arabascato. The "Spirit of Life's" outer basin is composed of travertine. Russin also was responsible for the naming of the sculpture. The City of Hope National Medical Center now uses the silhouette of the sculpture's statue as its official logo and awards the Spirit of Life award to major financial donors.

Russin's other well known pieces include the "Wyoming Crystal", which stands at the Wyoming State Capitol, and the "Chthonodynamis", a granite statue which stands at the United States Department of Energy headquarters in Washington, D.C.

Other works by Russin are currently housed at the Hyde Park Museum, the University of Wyoming, the National Naval Medical Center in Bethesda, Maryland and Gettysburg National Military Park in Gettysburg, Pennsylvania. A Russin sculpture of three steelworkers dated 1942 adorns the wall in the U.S. Post Office of the former steel mill town of Conshohocken, Pennsylvania. Known collectors of Russin's include California Senator Dianne Feinstein, Bill Cosby, and Carl Reiner.

The University of Wyoming campus features many Russin public sculptures, including bas reliefs on a variety of buildings, a life-size sculpture of Benjamin Franklin located south of the College of Arts and Sciences, and a sculpture entitled "The University of Wyoming Family" in Prexy's Pasture, a public commons area located between the various colleges of the university.

=== Abraham Lincoln Memorial Monument ===
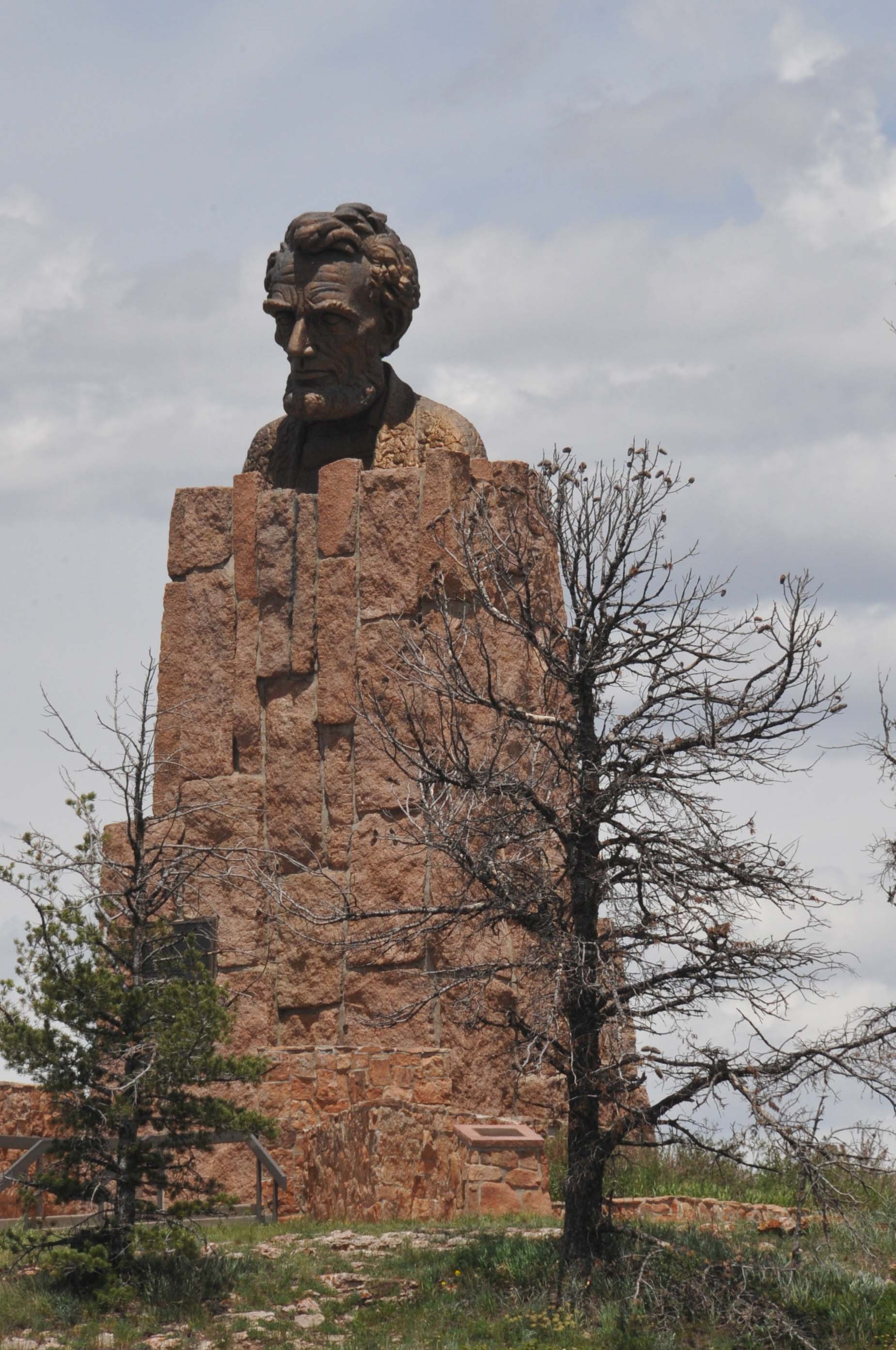
Russin's 1959 sculpture of Lincoln at Abraham Lincoln Memorial Monument located at the highest point on the Lincoln Highway.

Robert Russin's massive bust of Abraham Lincoln stands 12 1/2 feet (3.8 m) high and rests on a 30-foot-tall (9.1 m) granite pedestal at the Summit Rest Area on Interstate 80 east of Laramie. Russin originally erected the sculpture in 1959 nearby on Sherman Hill overlooking the old U.S. Highway 30 (Lincoln Highway). In 1969, after Interstate 80 was built, state officials moved the monument to become a centerpiece at the Summit Rest Area and Visitor Center between the cities of Cheyenne and Laramie.

However, the travels of Lincoln's bust began more than a decade earlier and thousands of miles to the south of Sherman Hill and the Summit Rest Area. Russin decided when planning the sculpture that the wild temperatures swings of the Wyoming plains would not provide the stable environment that he needed to craft the Lincoln sculpture. Instead, he turned to Mexico City. Russin built the 4,500-pound bronze bust in Mexico during a period of 11 months using some 10 tons of clay in a lost-wax process of casting. Russin cast Lincoln's monumental bust in more than 30 bronze pieces designed to be bolted together. He then shipped the sculpture from Mexico to Laramie. The first leg of the 1958 shipment featured rail travel to Denver, Colorado.

"The statute [sic] came up from Mexico with armed guards from the Mexican Army, because they were afraid that someone was going to steal it", said the late sculptor's son, Joe Russin, in an interview for the Laramie Boomerang.

The bust continued its journey north from Denver to Laramie by truck transport. All went well until the truck reached Laramie. Joe Russin recalls:

"My dad hadn’t thought about how low the wires were over Grand Avenue. So they had to move it through Laramie really early in the morning and they cut the electric and telephone wires for each block as they went through."

An estimated 200,000 travelers view the monumental sculpture annually.

== Death ==
Robert Russin died in Los Angeles at the age of 93 of kidney disease and hypertension on December 13, 2007. He was survived by his three sons: Joseph Russin, the executive editor of KTLA news; Robin U. Russin, a screenwriting professor at the University of California Riverside; and Lincoln David Russin, a radiologist. Before his death, the sculptor had requested that he be buried near his favorite sculpture, Abraham Lincoln's bust, east of Laramie at the Summit Rest Area and Visitor Center.

Russin's son, Joe, obtained permission from the Wyoming Department of Transportation Director and Department of Parks and Cultural Resources to construct a small stone cairn near the Lincoln bust to hold the urns of his father, Robert, and mother, Adele. The stone structure features a plaque with the notation: "The State of Wyoming is proud to honor Robert I. Russin and Adele M. Russin in recognition of their contribution to art, culture and education." The family held a memorial service celebrating the sculptor's life in the visitor center, including comments by the Wyoming governor and state senator and ambassador to Guatemala Tom Stroock, according to the Casper Star Tribune.
