= Laramie, North Park and Western Railroad =

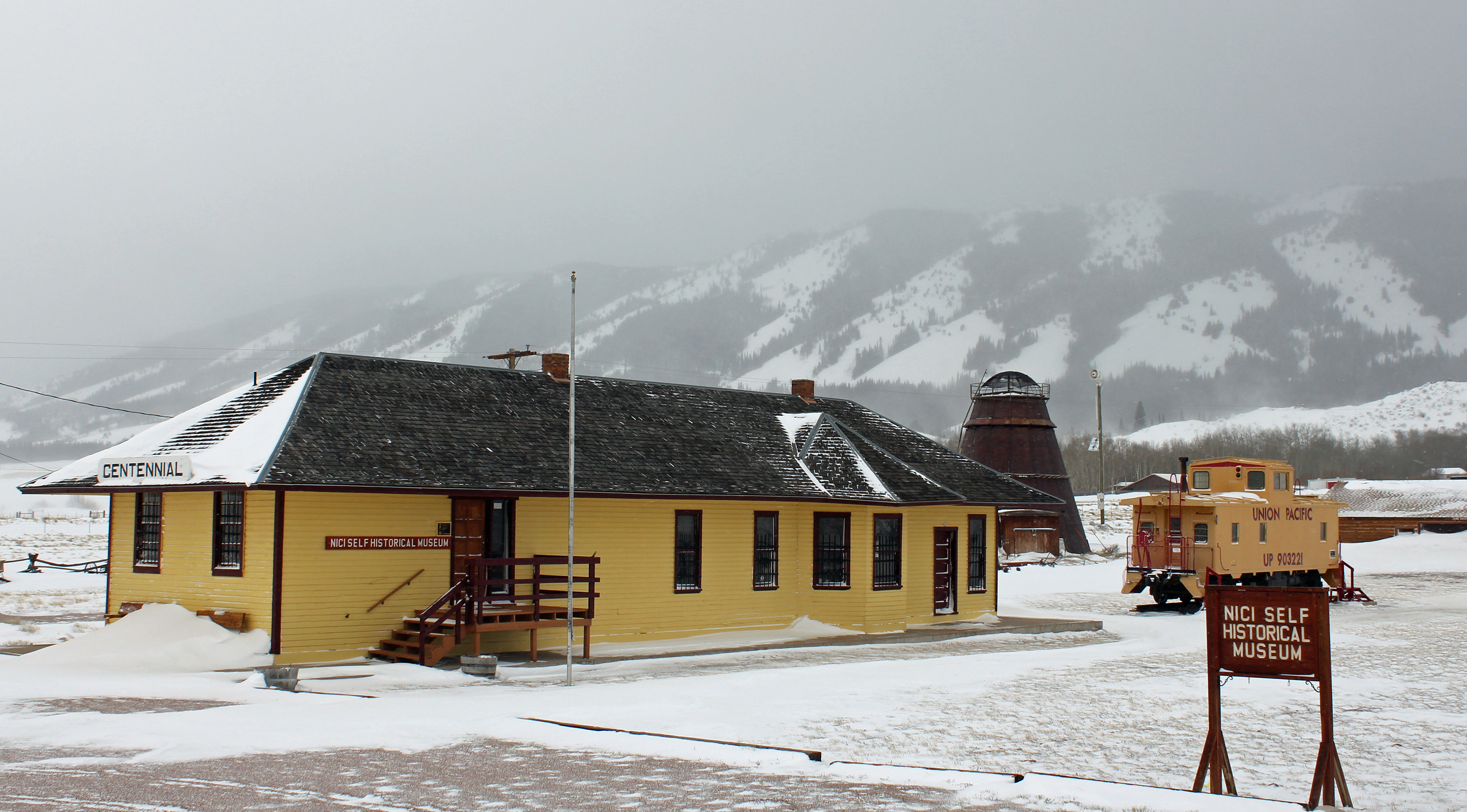
Centennial Depot built in 1907 for the Laramie, North Park and Western Railroad

Fremont Station of the Laramie, North Park and Western Railroad in 1911. Built in 1907 at 499 Fremont Street and demolished in 1951. The Laramie Fremont was west of the Laramie Railroad Depot. The 1924 brick engine house is still standing just south of the site of the former station

The Laramie, North Park and Western Railroad was a railroad in the U.S. states of Wyoming and Colorado between Laramie, Wyoming and Coalmont, Colorado. It operated under several different names between 1901 and 1951 prior to absorption by the Union Pacific Railroad.

== History ==
The railroad was established in 1901 as the Laramie, Hahns Peak and Pacific Railway Company by Isaac Van Horn, who planned to construct the line to the mining camps near Gold Hill in the Snowy Range west of Laramie. Van Horn and his partners also invested in the mining camp of Centennial 30 miles (48 km) west of Laramie at the base of the mountains. Under the auspices of the Acme Consolidated Gold & Mining Company, the partners constructed a sawmill, lumber yard, newspaper, and other improvements. Fighting financial issues, the railroad did not arrive in Centennial until 1907 after mining operations in the Snowy Range had mostly died out.

The company opted to go south to North Park in Colorado. The company bought part of a coal deposit near Walden, Colorado and named it Coalmont. The first train reached Walden in October 1911 and Coalmont in December. The line was very difficult and expensive to operate during winter. In 1914, the company was unable to pay its mortgage and the Colorado, Wyoming and Eastern Railroad took control of the line. In April 1924, the line was sold to new owners who renamed it the Northern Colorado and Eastern Railroad Company. The citizens in Laramie requested the name of the town be in the line, so in June, it was renamed again as Laramie, North Park and Western Railroad. David Webster Adamson retired as general superintendent of the Laramie, North Park, and Western railroad on June 1, 1941.

The line continued to struggle through the 1930s, and the Interstate Commerce Commission urged Union Pacific to take over. In 1935, the UP acquired control of the LNP&W, and Union Pacific ran the line under the LNP&W name until 1951, when the companies merged, the line becoming the Coalmont Branch of the Union Pacific, and the LNP&W depot in Laramie was closed. Shortline Wyoming Colorado Railroad bought the line in 1987, and subsequently abandoned it in the Summer of 1999.

In The City of Laramie, the Laramie, Hahns Peak and Pacific Railway Company opened the Fremont Station in 1903 at 499 Fremont Street, west of the Laramie Railroad Depot. The Fremont Station was demolished in 1951. This depot was in what is now the Laramie West Side Historic District

== See also ==
- List of defunct Colorado railroads
- List of defunct Wyoming railroads
- Laramie, North Park and Pacific Railroad and Telegraph Company
