= Laramie West Side Historic District =

Historic district in Wyoming, United States

- U.S. National Register of Historic Places
- U.S. Historic district
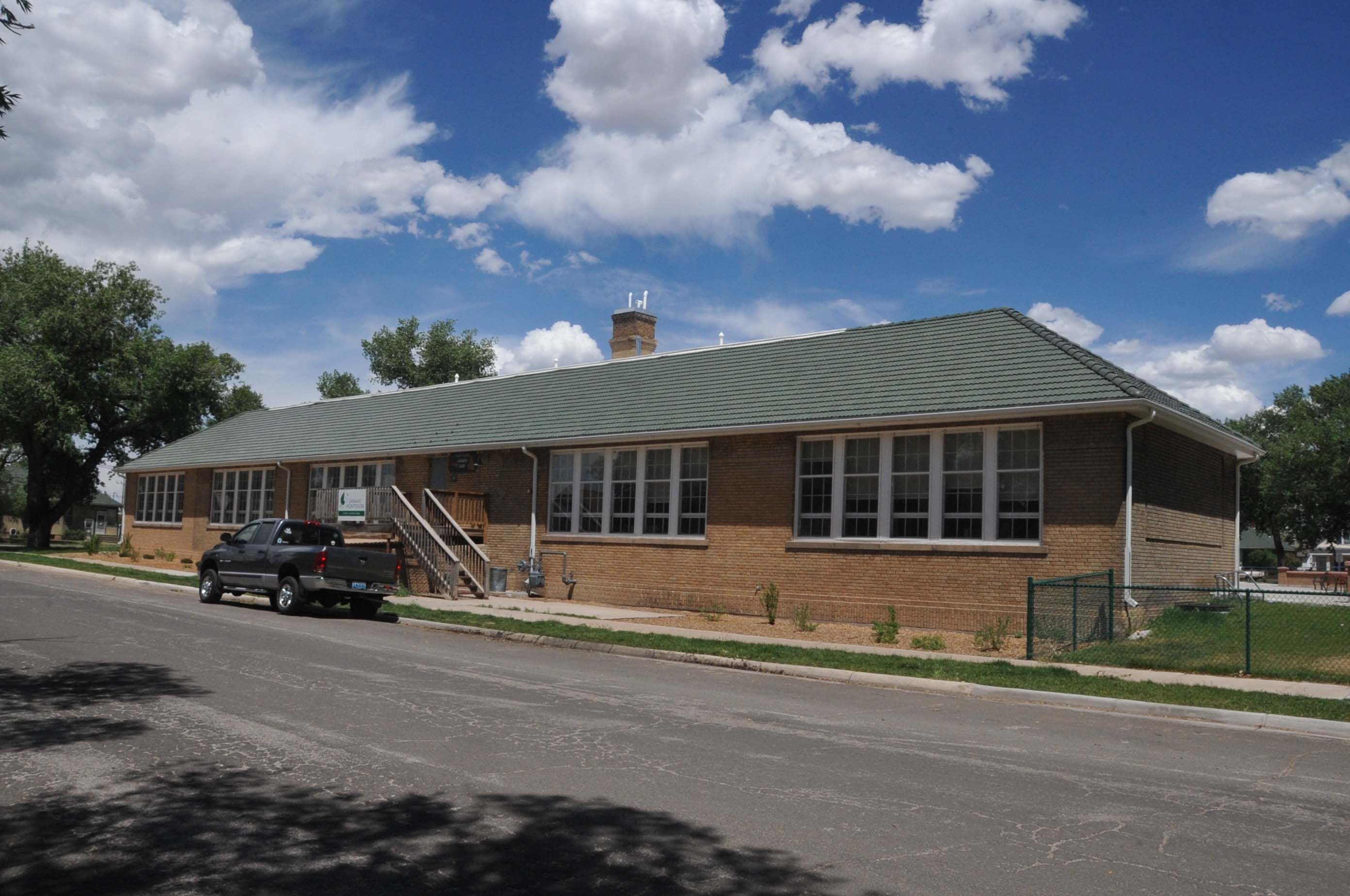
- Lincoln School in the Historic District
- Location: Roughly bounded by Rail tracks, Laramie River, Park St., Clark St., Laramie, Wyoming
- Coordinates: 41.313°N 105.599°W
- Area: ~ 320 acres
- Architectural style: Late 19th And Early 20th Century craftsman bungalows and cottages
- NRHP reference No.: 100012058
- Added to NRHP: August 4, 2025

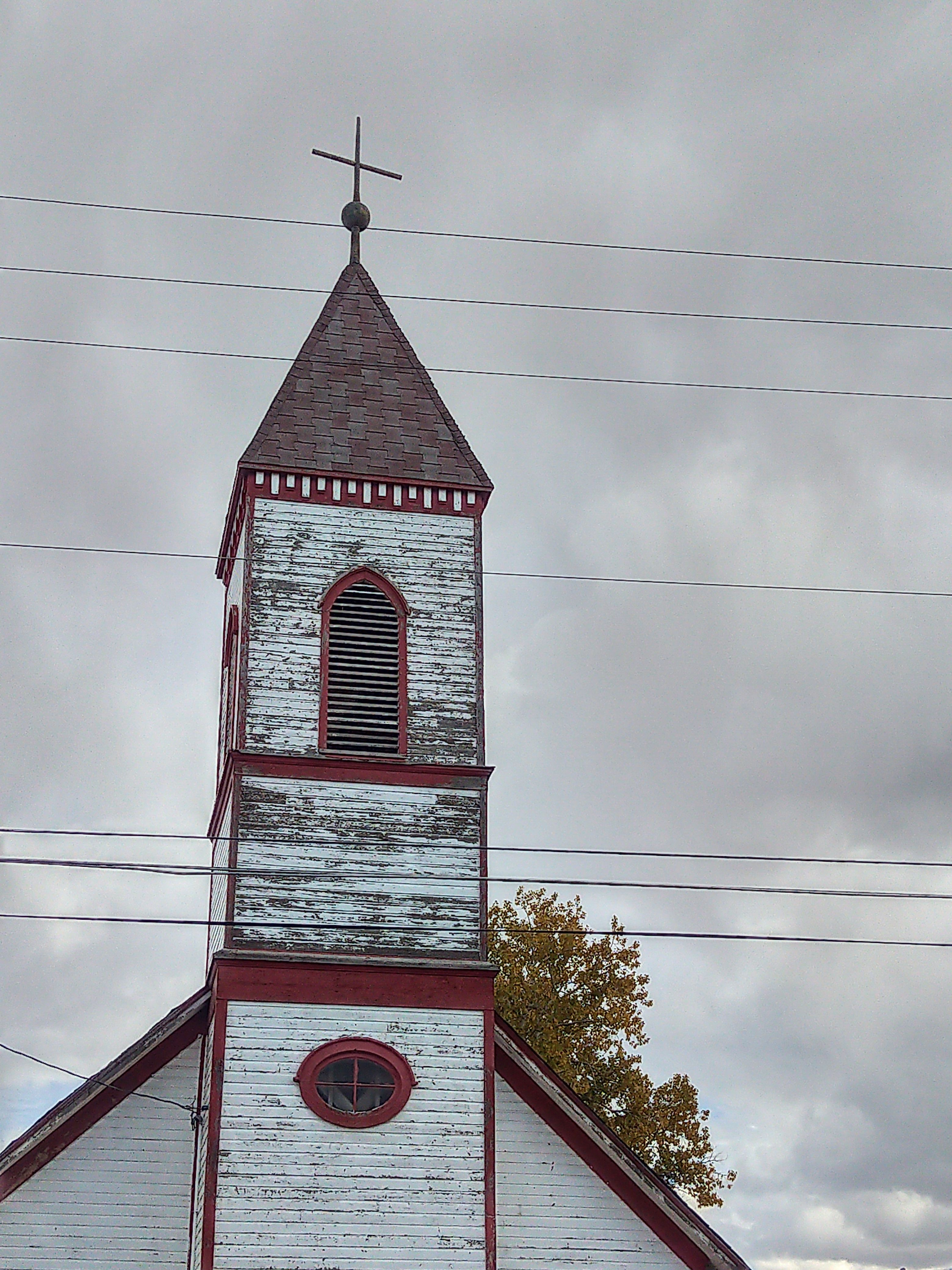
South Pine Street Church built in 1880 as a Scandinavian Lutheran Church, in Laramie West Side Historic District

Fremont Station of the Laramie, Hahns Peak and Pacific Railway in 1911. Built in 1907 at 499 Fremont Street and demolished in 1951. The Laramie Fremont was west of the Laramie Railroad Depot. The 1924 brick engine house is still standing just south of the site of the former Fremont Station

Laramie West Side Historic District is a National Register of Historic Places listings in Albany County, Wyoming and a Historic districts in the United States located in Laramie, Wyoming. The site is noted for its historic buildings in a 32-block residential neighborhood and the historic Union Pacific Railroad tracks. The site included 248 individual properties.

== History ==
The West Side neighborhood started as Laramie's railroad town. The Union Pacific Railroad's First transcontinental railroad arrived in 1868, starting a housing boom along the west side of the tracks and the Laramie Train Depot. The City of Laramie was incorporated in 1874. Henry D. Hodgeman, Patrick Carroll, and Lawrence Fee purchased a 320-acre parcel of land in 1874 from the Union Pacific Railroad West of the train depot and tracks. Hodgeman mapped out his parcel for city blocks and lots on December 20, 1875. Carroll and Fee turn their lot planning over to Hodgeman. The grocery stores and many other businesses that Hodgeman planned are now gone. There are three churches, including the former Swedish Lutheran Church. In its early years, the West Side neighborhood was home to many Union Pacific workers and some industrial plants. The houses are on the smaller side, being mostly craftsman bungalows, Gable front houses and cottages. The Spiegelberg family's lumber yard and construction business, still operating, built many of the homes. The Laramie City Directory of 1897 listed many German and Scandinavian residents in the West side. The other builders of the early homes were Wilbur A. Hitchcock, William Dubois, and Hitchcock and Hitchcock. Scandinavian residents built the 1880 Lutheran Church, now the Landmark United Pentecostal Church at 201 S. Pine Street. An automobile bridge, called the University Avenue Viaduct, was built in 1930 linking Downtown Laramie and the West Side at University Avenue. The Viaduct was used till 1963, when the Clark Street bridge opened. The Snowy Range Bridge replaced the Clark Street bridge in 2018. One East side of the tracks is the Laramie Downtown Historic District and the 1924 Laramie Train Depot. There is a Garfield Street foot bridge that links West and East Laramie Historic Districts. In 1929, a pedestrian bridge at Garfield Street was built, The Warren Truss pedestrian bridge. Before the pedestrian bridge, there had been accidents with pedestrians crossing the many railroad tracks at the depot and rail yard. The bridge is still in use today.

== Site ==
Laramie’s West Side neighborhood is bounded to the east by the Union Pacific Railroad tracks. To the west, the Laramie River. Park Avenue to the south and Clark Street to the north. The site includes Lincoln School, now the Lincoln Community Center, built in 1924, and is on the U.S. National Register of Historic Places. The Lincoln School closed in 1978.

== Construction dates ==
The University of Wyoming surveyed the houses for the city in 2011. Laramie West Side Historic District construction dates with homes built in the date range:

- Date range - Homes
- 1870 – 1879 - 15
- 1880 – 1889 - 19
- 1890 – 1899 - 59
- 1900 – 1909 - 30
- 1910 – 1919 - 38
- 1920 – 1929 - 34
- 1930 – 1939 - 14
- 1940 – 1949 - 12
- 1950 – 1959 - 12
- Post 1960 - 10

== Streets ==
Laramie West Side Historic District Streets:

- N. Railroad Street
- N. Hodgeman Street
- S. Hodgeman Street
- N. Pine Street
- S. Pine Street
- N. Cedar Street
- S. Cedar Street
- S. Spruce Street
- W. Clark Street
- W. Fremont Street
- W. University Avenue
- W. Ivinson Avenue
- W. Grand Avenue
- W. Garfield Street
- W. Custer Street
- W. Kearney Street
- W. Sheridan Street
- W. Park Avenue

== Former buildings ==
- The Laramie Fremont Station was the train depot for the Laramie, Hahns Peak and Pacific Railway opened in 1903 at 499 Fremont Street. The train's two-story depot was the terminus for the train that went to the Centennial Depot, then later on to Albany and Walden, Colorado. The Fremont Station was demolished in 1951.
- Wyoming Pressed Brick Company opened in 1903 at 581 W Garfield Street, next to the Laramie River. The brick factory made the bricks for the Laramie Presbyterian Church (520 Grand Ave, now Calvary Laramie Church) and the Carnegie Public Library (405 E. Grand Ave, Now houses government offices). There are no remains of the brick factory, demolished in 1945.

== See also ==
- Laramie, North Park and Western Railroad
- Albany County, Wyoming monuments and markers
- Cheyenne Depot Museum
