= List of Wyoming railroads =

The following railroads operate in the U.S. state of Wyoming.

== Common freight carriers ==
- Bighorn Divide and Wyoming Railroad (BDW)
- BNSF Railway (BNSF)
- Canadian Pacific Railway (CP) through subsidiary Dakota, Minnesota and Eastern Railroad (DME)
- Rapid City, Pierre and Eastern Railroad (RCPE)
- Swan Ranch Railroad (SRRR)
- Union Pacific Railroad (UP)
- Wyoming Connect Railroad (WCT)

== Defunct railroads ==
Name	Mark	System (Note: This is one or more of the Class I railroads that the railroad became part of, if any.)	From	To	Successor	Notes
Bad Water Line	BDW		1988	2000	Bad Water Railway	
Bad Water Railway	BDW		2000	2002	Bighorn Divide and Wyoming Railroad	
Big Horn Railroad		CB&Q	1905	1916	Chicago, Burlington and Quincy Railroad	
Burlington Northern Inc.	BN		1970	1981	Burlington Northern Railroad	
Burlington Northern Railroad	BN		1981	1996	Burlington Northern and Santa Fe Railway	
Carbon Cut-Off Railway		UP	1889	1899	Union Pacific Railroad	
Cheyenne and Burlington Railroad		CB&Q	1887	1908	Chicago, Burlington and Quincy Railroad	
Cheyenne and Northern Railway		UP	1886	1890	Union Pacific, Denver and Gulf Railway	
Chicago, Burlington and Quincy Railroad	CB&Q, CBQ	CB&Q	1889	1970	Burlington Northern Inc.	
Chicago, Burlington and Quincy Railway		CB&Q	1901	1907	N/A	Leased the Chicago, Burlington and Quincy Railroad
Chicago and North Western Railway	CNW	CNW	1903	1972	Chicago and North Western Transportation Company	
Chicago and North Western Transportation Company	CNW	CNW	1972	1995	Union Pacific Railroad	
Colorado Railroad		CB&Q	1909	1930	Colorado and Southern Railway	
Colorado Central Railroad		UP	1877	1890	Union Pacific, Denver and Gulf Railway	
Colorado and Southern Railway	C&S, CS	CB&Q	1898	1981	Burlington Northern Railroad	
Colorado and Wyoming Railway	CW		1899	1980	N/A	
Colorado, Wyoming and Eastern Railway		UP	1914	1924	Northern Colorado and Eastern Railroad	
Denver Pacific Railway and Telegraph Company		UP	1867	1880	Union Pacific Railway	
Eastern Wyoming Railway		CNW	1890	1891	Fremont, Elkhorn and Missouri Valley Railroad	
Fremont, Elkhorn and Missouri Valley Railroad		CNW	1891	1903	Chicago and North Western Railway	
Grand Island and Northern Wyoming Railroad		CB&Q	1889	1897	Chicago, Burlington and Quincy Railroad	
Laramie, Hahns Peak and Pacific Railway			1901	1914	Colorado, Wyoming and Eastern Railway	
Laramie, North Park and Pacific Railroad and Telegraph Company		UP	1880	1900	Union Pacific Railroad	
Laramie, North Park and Western Railroad		UP	1924	1951	Union Pacific Railroad	
Nebraska, Wyoming and Western Railroad		CB&Q	1899	1908	Chicago, Burlington and Quincy Railroad	
North and South Railway			1923	1935	N/A	
Northern Colorado and Eastern Railroad		UP	1924	1924	Laramie, North Park and Western Railroad	
Oregon Short Line Railroad		UP	1897	1987	Union Pacific Railroad	
Oregon Short Line Railway		UP	1881	1889	Oregon Short Line and Utah Northern Railway	
Oregon Short Line and Utah Northern Railway		UP	1889	1897	Oregon Short Line Railroad	
Saratoga and Encampment Railway		UP	1905	1928	Saratoga and Encampment Valley Railroad	
Saratoga and Encampment Valley Railroad		UP	1928	1951	Union Pacific Railroad	
Union Pacific Railroad		UP	1862	1880	Union Pacific Railway	
Union Pacific Railway		UP	1880	1898	Union Pacific Railroad	
Union Pacific, Denver and Gulf Railway		UP	1890	1898	Colorado and Southern Railway	
Wyoming Railway	WYO		1909	1953	N/A	
Wyoming Central Railway		CNW	1885	1891	Fremont, Elkhorn and Missouri Valley Railroad	
Wyoming Colorado Railroad	WYCO		1987	2007	none	Line scrapped in 2007, the division in the state of Oregon is still in operation, however.
Wyoming and Missouri River Railroad			1895	1924	Wyoming and Missouri River Railway	
Wyoming and Missouri River Railway			1924	1927	N/A	
Wyoming North and South Railroad			1923	1924	North and South Railway	
Wyoming and Northwestern Railway		CNW	1904	1920	Chicago and North Western Railway	
Wyoming State Railway		CNW	1904	1904	Wyoming and Northwestern Railway	
Wyoming Western Railroad		UP	1900	1910	Oregon Short Line Railroad	

Passenger carriers

- National Railroad Passenger Corporation (Amtrak). Service along the former San Francisco Zephyr lasted from 1972 to 1983 and the Pioneer lasted only from 1992 to 1997.
