= Brooklyn Lodge =

Historic house in Wyoming, United States

- U.S. National Register of Historic Places
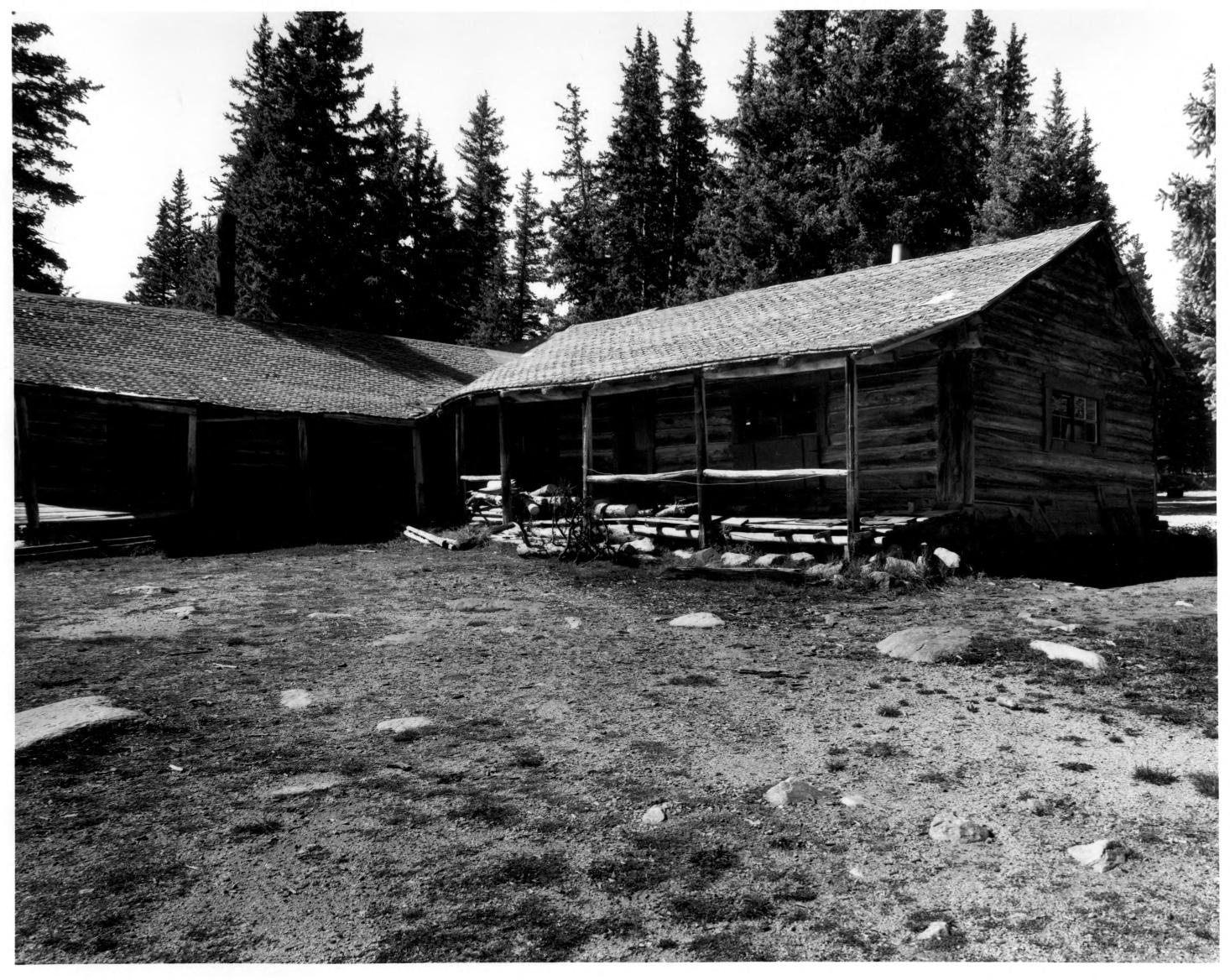
- Brooklyn Lake Lodge in 1988

- Location within Wyoming Location within the United States
- Location: Albany County, Wyoming, USA
- Nearest city: Centennial, Wyoming
- Coordinates: 41°21′21″N 106°13′57″W
- Built: 1922
- Architect: Harry D. "Hoot" Jones
- NRHP reference No.: 89001068
- Added to NRHP: October 24, 1989

The Brooklyn Lodge or Brooklyn Lake Lodge was built in 1922–23 for former rodeo performer Harry "Hoot" Jones. The log lodge, located near Centennial, Wyoming in the Snowy Range of Medicine Bow National Forest, was operated by the Jones family until the late 1930s.
