= Snowy Range Ski Area =

Ski area in Wyoming, United States

Snowy Range Ski and Recreation Area
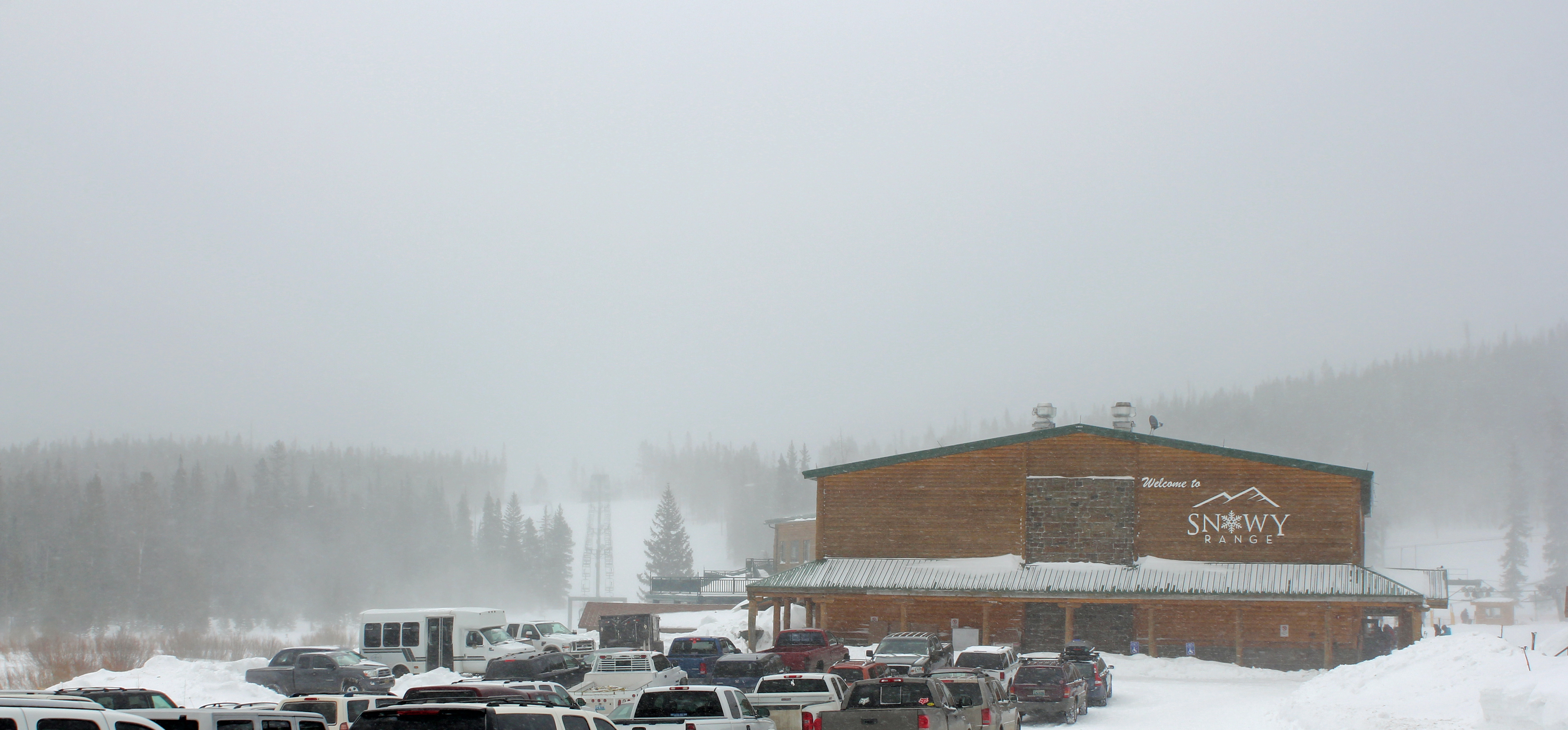
- The ski area in 2014

- Location in Wyoming Snowy Range Ski and Recreation Area (the United States)
- Location: Snowy Range, Albany County, Wyoming
- Nearest city: Centennial, Wyoming
- Coordinates: 41.341231°N 106.183441°W
- Vertical: 865 ft (264 m)
- Top elevation: 9,663 feet (2,945 m)
- Base elevation: 8,798 feet (2,682 m)
- Skiable area: 250 acres (101 ha)
- Trails: 27
- Longest run: 1.8 miles (3 km)
- Lift system: 5 lifts (4 chairlifts, 1 magic carpet)
- Snowfall: 250 inches (635 cm)
- Website: Official website

Snowy Range Ski and Recreation Area is a small ski area in southeastern Wyoming, located about five miles from the town of Centennial in Medicine Bow National Forest. At 32 miles away, it is the closest ski area to Laramie, home of the University of Wyoming.
