= Carbon Cut-Off Railway =

Railroad line in Wyoming, U.S.

Overview
- Headquarters: Rawlins, Wyoming
- Locale: Wyoming
- Dates of operation: February 12, 1889–

Technical
- Track gauge: 4 ft 8 1/2 in (1,435 mm) standard gauge
- Length: 19.22 miles (30.93 km)

The Carbon Cut-Off Railway was a railroad line in the U.S. state of Wyoming. In 1889 the Union Pacific Railroad invested $221,000 (equivalent to about $7.73 million today) to construct a rail line from Allen station on the main line (near Medicine Bow) to their coal mines near Hanna. In 1892 the railroad operated 17.16 miles (27.62 km) of track between Allen and Hanna and an additional 2.06 miles (3.32 km) of track to the Hanna mine.

Later the UP abandoned its original main line between Allen and Dana, and now the Carbon Cut-Off Railway, along with a connection from Hanna to Dana, is part of the UP's Laramie Subdivision.

== See also ==
- List of defunct Wyoming railroads
