= Laramie, North Park and Pacific Railroad and Telegraph Company =

Former railroad line in the United States

The Laramie, North Park and Pacific Railroad and Telegraph Company was a short lived railroad line in the U.S. state of Wyoming. In 1880, a group of Albany County businessmen proposed a rail line west from Laramie across the Medicine Bow Range. The railroad only made it to the Soda Lakes, 13.36 miles (21.50 km) southwest of Laramie, serving mining camps in the area for several years. The Union Pacific Railway soon gained control of the line. Most of the line was subsequently abandoned, but in 1900 successor Union Pacific Railroad bought the easternmost 1.63 miles (2.62 km).

== See also ==
- List of defunct Wyoming railroads
