= Parker Ranch House =

- U.S. National Register of Historic Places
- Nearest city: Laramie Peak, Wyoming
- Area: less than one acre
- Built: 1915
- NRHP reference No.: 85003209
- Added to NRHP: December 13, 1985

The Parker Ranch House was built near Laramie Peak in 1915 as a homestead in the Medicine Bow Mountains. The log structure incorporates design features that are unusual for Wyoming, more closely resembling structures found in the southeastern and south central United States. The ranch house was listed on the National Register of Historic Places in 1985.
