= Medicine Bow Mountains =

Mountain range in the Western United States

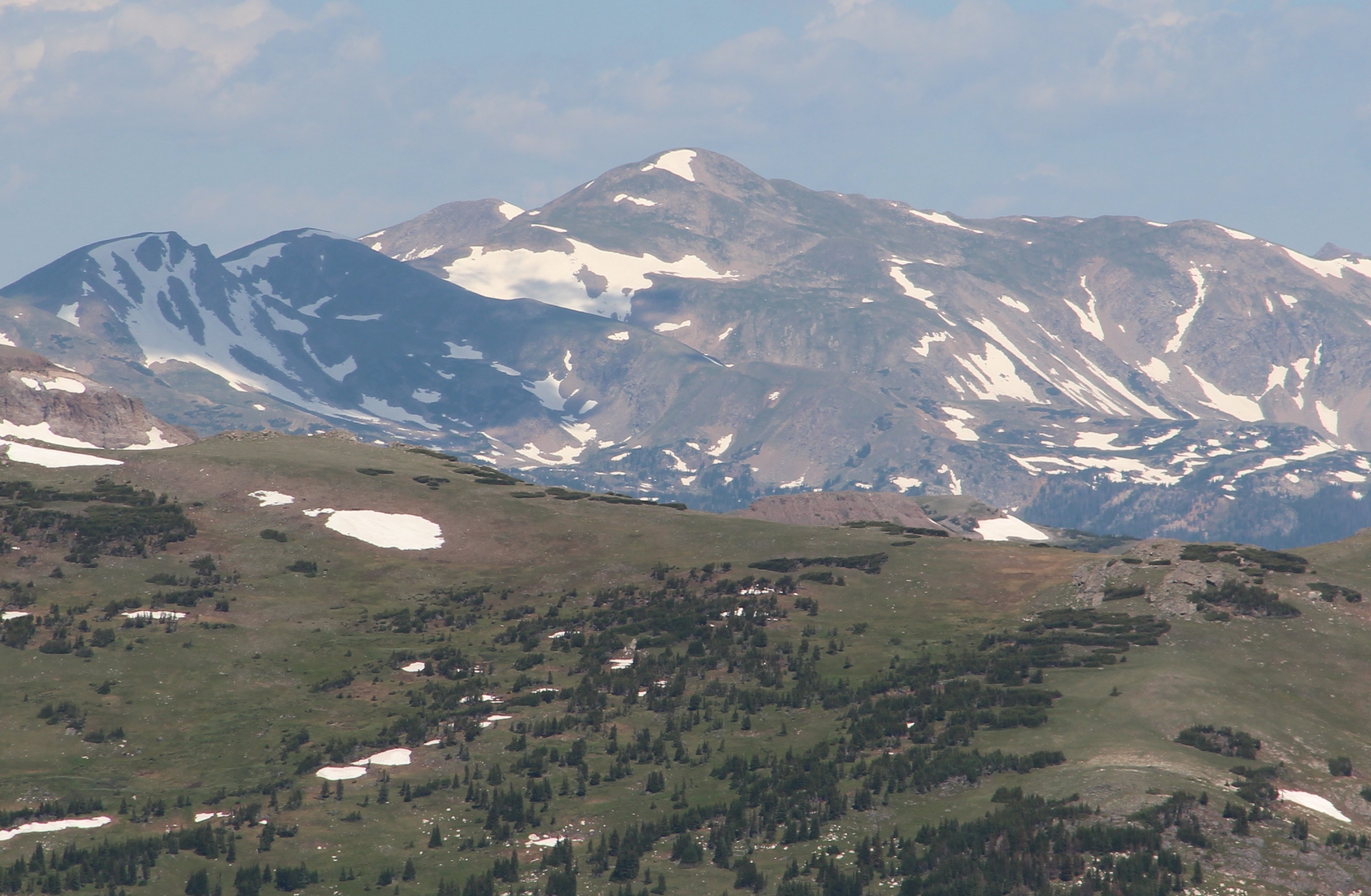
- Clark Peak viewed from Rocky Mountain National Park

Highest point
- Peak: Clark Peak
- Elevation: 12,951 ft (3,947 m)
- Listing: Mountain ranges of Colorado; Mountain ranges of Wyoming
- Coordinates: 40°36′23″N 105°55′48″W

Dimensions
- Length: 100 mi (160 km)

Geography
- Location within Colorado Location within Wyoming
- Country: United States
- States: Colorado; Wyoming
- Range coordinates: 40°49.7′N 106°4.7′W
- Parent range: Rocky Mountains

The Medicine Bow Mountains (Arapaho: 3ooxone’) from northern Colorado into southern Wyoming. The northern extent of this range is the sub-range the Snowy Range. From the northern end of Colorado's Never Summer Mountains, the Medicine Bow mountains extend north from Cameron Pass along the border between Larimer and Jackson counties in Colorado and northward into south central Wyoming. In Wyoming, the range sits west of Laramie, in Albany and Carbon counties to the route of the Union Pacific Railroad and U.S. Interstate 80. The mountains often serve as a symbol for the city of Laramie. The range is home to Snowy Range Ski Area.

The highest peak in the range is Clark Peak (12,960 feet (3,950 m)), located in the Rawah Wilderness along the southern end of the range in Northern Colorado. Much of the range is located within the Medicine Bow National Forest in Wyoming. The highest peak on the Wyoming side is Medicine Bow Peak (12,013 feet (3,662 m)). The range is drained along the western flank by the Michigan and Canadian rivers, tributaries of the North Platte in North Park. On its eastern flank it is drained by the Laramie River, another tributary of the North Platte.

== Geology ==
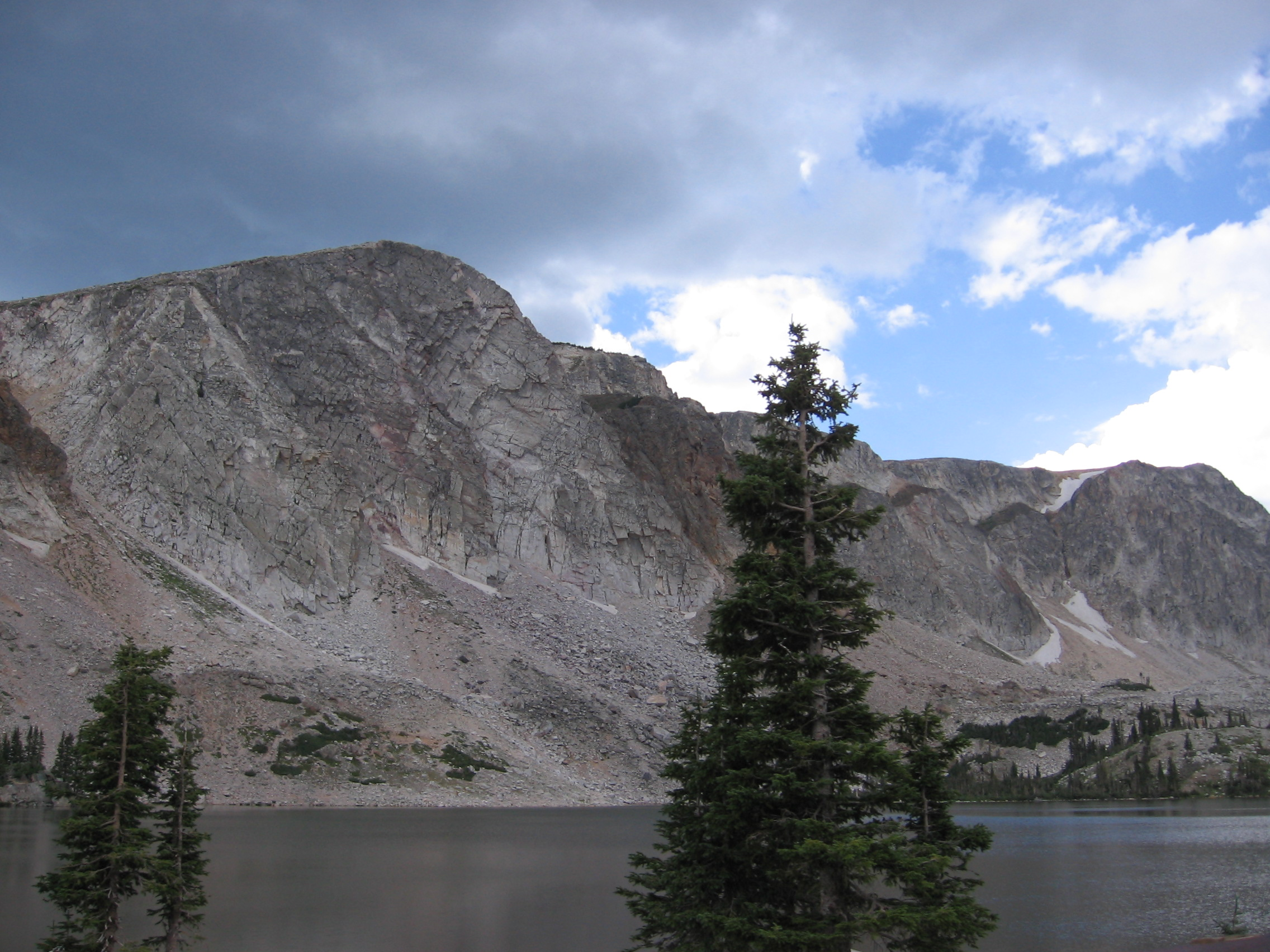
Medicine Bow Peak

The Medicine Bow Mountains resulted from continental compression during the Laramide Orogeny. Beginning about 70 million years ago, the Rockies began uplifting along thrust faults that broke up the Precambrian granite of Earth's crust. By 50 million years ago, all of Wyoming's major mountain ranges were elevated and the major basins defined. Rocks exposed along the flanks and peaks of the Medicine Bow Mountains span the Precambrian to modern, with the peaks composed of 2.4-2.0 billion year old Medicine Peak Quartzite. This rock was once a shallow marine sand deposit that has since been compressed and heated during burial, forming the metamorphic rock, quartzite. What may be traces of multicellular animals are preserved in this rock, making it of particular interest to paleontologists.

The Cheyenne belt, the 1.78–1.74 billion year old suture between the Wyoming craton and the Yavapai province that formed as North America was assembled, is exposed in the Medicine Bow Mountains.

== Fauna ==
Wildlife abounds in these mountains, with mule deer, elk, moose, black bear, mountain lions, coyotes, marmots, pika, Richardson's ground squirrels, bobcats, and lynx as well as a tremendous variety of birds. Brook and rainbow trout as well as grayling and golden trout are found in the streams. A disjunct population of arctic fairy shrimp (Brachinecta paludosa) has been documented in a few lakes in the northern part of the range.

== Research ==
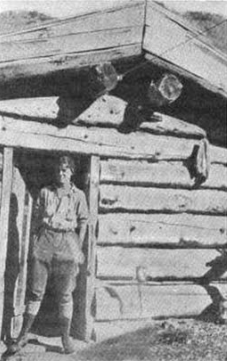
Lorraine Lindsley at the Medicine Bow Range, 1921

Since 1987, the Glacier Lakes area of the Snowy Range has been home to the Glacier Lakes Ecosystem Experiments Site (GLEES), a field unit of the Rocky Mountain Research Station, United States Forest Service. Areas of scientific inquiry at the site include atmospheric pollutant deposition, forest carbon and water vapor cycling, effect of insect outbreaks, and alpine lake and stream hydrology. The site is 642 hectares (1,590 acres) in extent and hosts facilities for the National Atmospheric Deposition Program (NADP), the National Dry Deposition Network (NDDN), and AmeriFlux (Eddy covariance).

== Airline crash ==
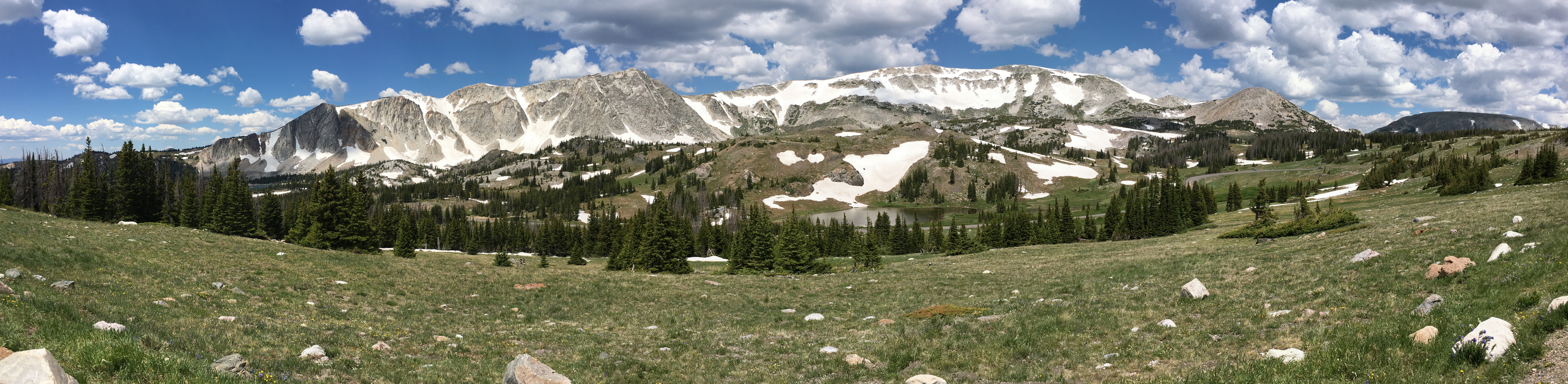
Snowy Range's small glaciers

This mountain range is also home to some of the remains of a Douglas DC-4 aircraft, operated as United Airlines Flight 409. The aircraft crashed into Medicine Bow Peak on October 6, 1955, killing all 66 people on board.

== Historical sites ==
- Ryan Park Camp opened in 1930 as a Civilian Conservation Corps (CCC) camp during the Great Depression. From 1942 to 1945 Ryan Park Camp operated as World War 2 Prisoner of war (POW) camp.
- Brush Creek Work Center, built by the Ryan Park Camp, is listed on the National Register of Historic Places on April 11, 1994. Brush Creek Work Center was designed by architects of the United States Forest Service in rustic style.
- Parker Ranch House is listed on the National Register of Historic Places on December 13, 1985.
- Centennial Work Center is listed on the National Register of Historic Places, placed on April 11, 1994.
- Centennial Depot in Centennial, Wyoming built in 1907, now part of the Nici Self Historical Museum.
- Brooklyn Lodge built in 1923 for former rodeo performer Harry "Hoot" Jones.
