= Bighorn Divide and Wyoming Railroad =

Railroad in Wyoming, United States

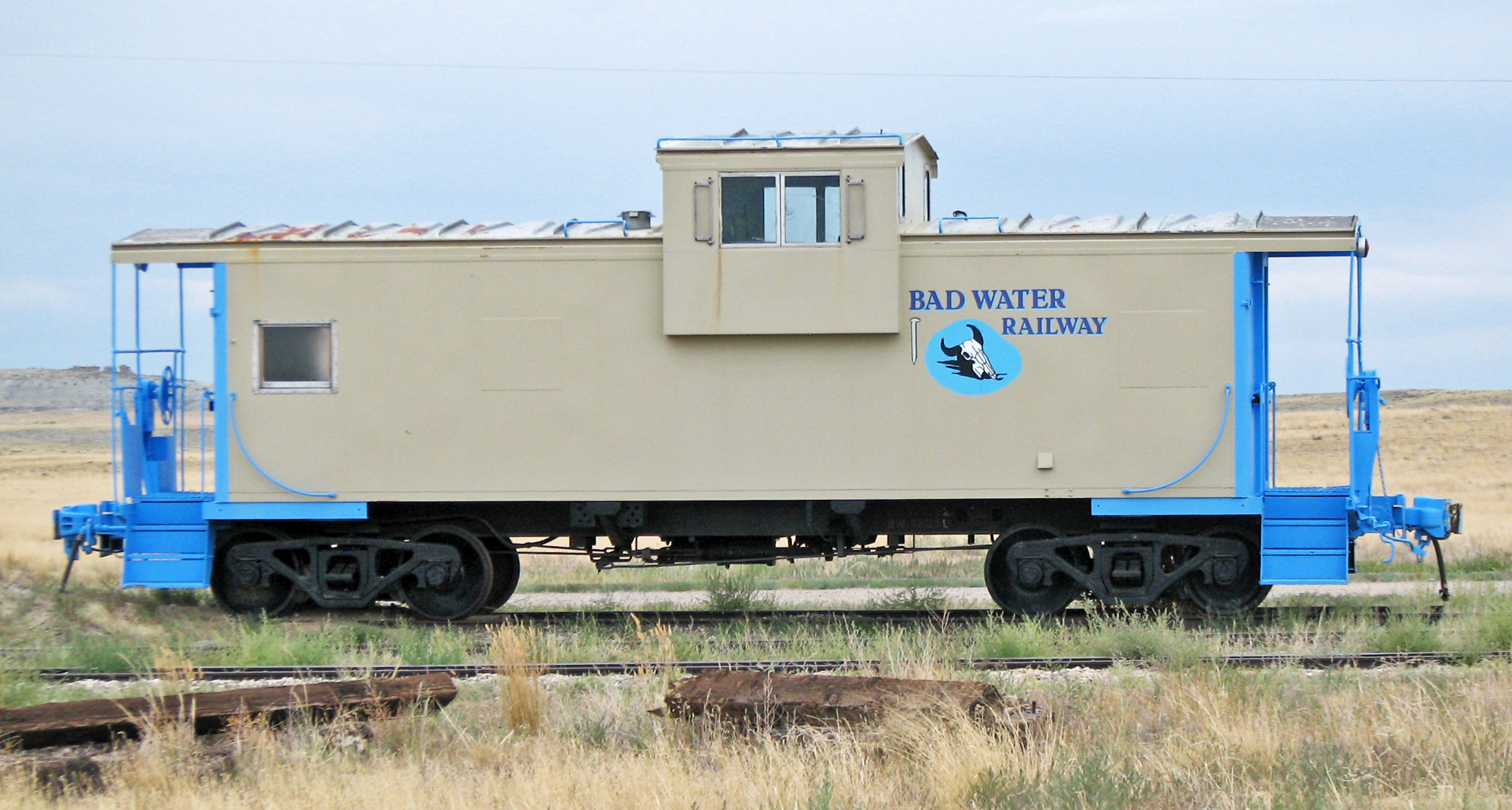
- A Bighorn Divide and Wyoming Railroad caboose, bearing the logo of the former Bad Water Railway

Overview
- Headquarters: Riverton, Wyoming
- Reporting mark: BDW
- Dates of operation: 1985–

Technical
- Track gauge: 4 ft 8 1/2 in (1,435 mm) standard gauge
- Length: 41.2 miles (66.3 km)

Other
- Website: https://bdwrail.com/

The Bighorn Divide and Wyoming Railroad (reporting mark BDW), founded in 1985, is a shortline railroad in Wyoming, United States. The company originally operated under the name Bad Water Line before its current operator purchased it in 2002. It operates 41.2 miles (66.3 km) of track within the state, including a line it owns between Shoshoni and Bonneville, Wyoming, along with trackage rights over BNSF Railway to Lysite that allow it to access a branch line to an oil facility. The company also performs switching at a rail yard near Casper, Wyoming, that is unconnected to its other operations.

== History ==
The Bighorn Divide and Wyoming Railroad was formed as the Bad Water Line in 1985, with its origins in a trucking company that transloaded cargo to trains in Bonneville, Wyoming. In 1988, the company purchased a former Chicago and North Western Railway line to prevent its abandonment, and began operations between Shoshoni and Bonneville. The company renamed to the Bad Water Railway in 2000, and the following year began service on a newly built line between Lost Cabin and the BNSF Railway mainline in Lysite, which serves a ConocoPhillips facility. Via a 2002 purchase, the Bighorn Divide and Wyoming Railroad took over the Bad Water Railway's operations.

A railcar repair shop was built in Shoshoni, in 2006. The trucking company, railroad, and repair shop are all owned by local businessman Cliff Root. The Bighorn Divide and Wyoming Railroad was recognized by BNSF in 2013 for substantially growing its traffic, with an annual increase in traffic of approximately 14 percent per year from 2003 to 2013. Significant increases in business have come from fracking within the Niobrara Formation, with the railroad carrying materials such as frac sand and drilling equipment.

== Operations ==
The railroad owns and operates railyards in Bonneville and Shoshoni and is also the operator for a transloading facility in Bishop, Wyoming, (near Casper) known as CTran; the facility in Bishop is not connected to the rest of BDW's lines. The company interchanges with BNSF in Bonneville and in Bishop. Cliff Root reported the company handled around 10,500 railcars annually in 2007. In October 2019, the BDW fully purchased the Bishop facility, buying out the company Granite Peaks which previously owned a partial interest. The Bighorn Divide and Wyoming Railroad is headquartered in Riverton.

In addition to its 4.2-mile long main line which it owns and operates, the company has 23.5 miles of trackage rights over BNSF between Bonneville and Lysite, which allow it to serve the CononcoPhillips oil facility in Lost Cabin via a 4-mile long leased spur. From Lost Cabin, liquid sulfur is loaded and brought to Bonneville. At the Bonneville yard, tank cars of sulfur are made up into unit trains which are then handed off to BNSF. BDW operates a total of 41.2 miles (66.3 km) of track in Wyoming, including trackage within yards; this translates to 31.7 route miles (51.0 km).
