= Centennial Depot =

- U.S. National Register of Historic Places
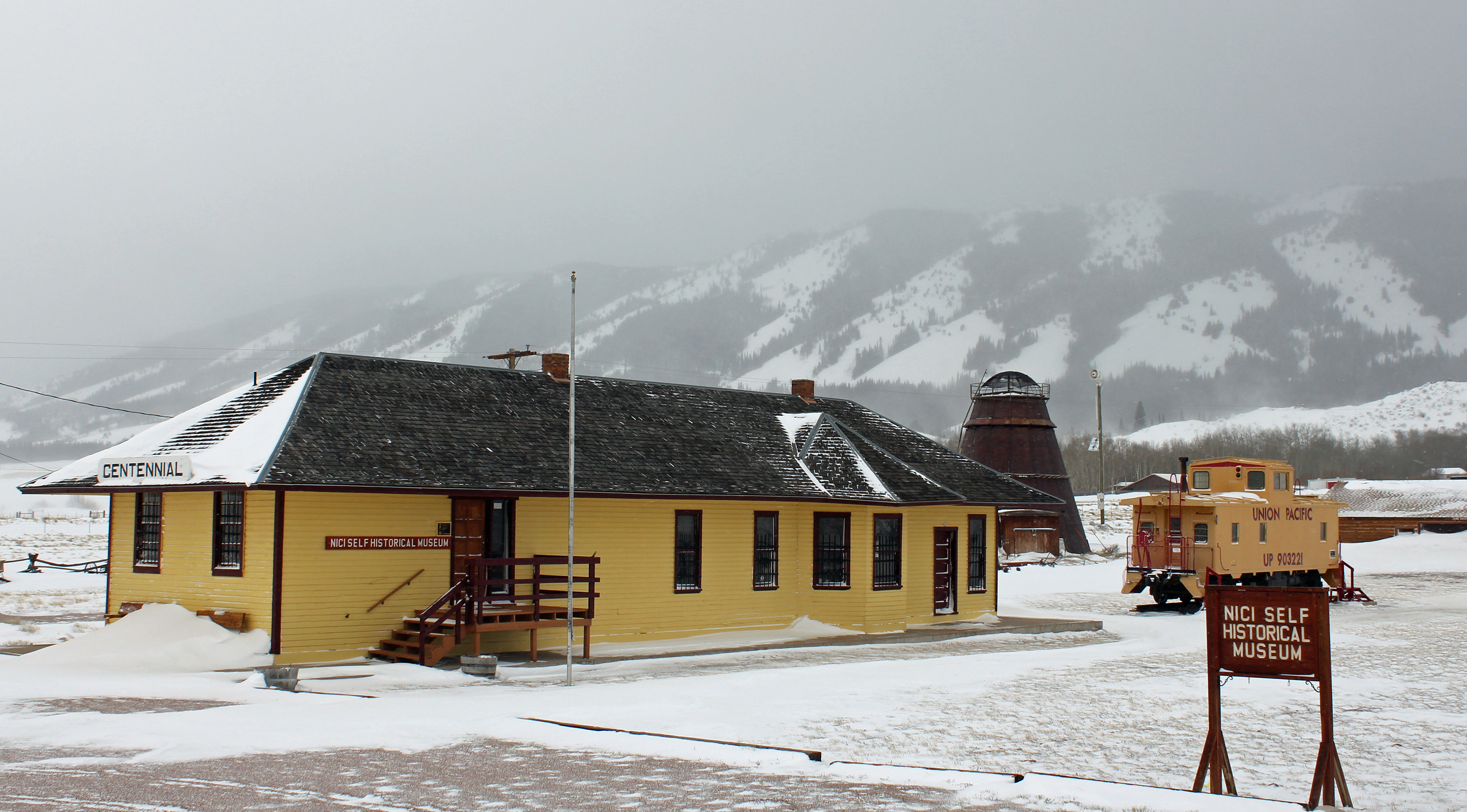
- Nici Self Museum in 2014

- Location within Wyoming
- Location: WY 130, Centennial, Wyoming, United States
- Coordinates: 41°17′48″N 106°08′12″W
- Area: 2 acres (0.81 ha)
- Built: 1907
- NRHP reference No.: 82001828
- Added to NRHP: November 8, 1982

The Centennial Depot, also known as the Nici Self Historical Museum, was built in 1907 for the Laramie, Hahns Peak and Pacific Railway in Centennial, Wyoming, United States. In addition to railroad services, the depot housed a post office and, at times, a grocery store. The depot was operated by the Union Pacific Railroad until the early 1970s. Demolition was proposed, but the depot was purchased by the Centennial Valley Historical Association, which moved it a short distance to its present site. It is operated as the Nici Self Museum.

The long frame structure has a hipped roof with broad overhanging eaves. A projecting bay, arranged to look down the train line on the original site, is located near one end. It was listed on the National Register of Historic Places on November 8, 1982.

== See also ==
- Laramie, North Park and Western Railroad
- Laramie Railroad Depot
