= Centennial, Wyoming =

- Census-designated place
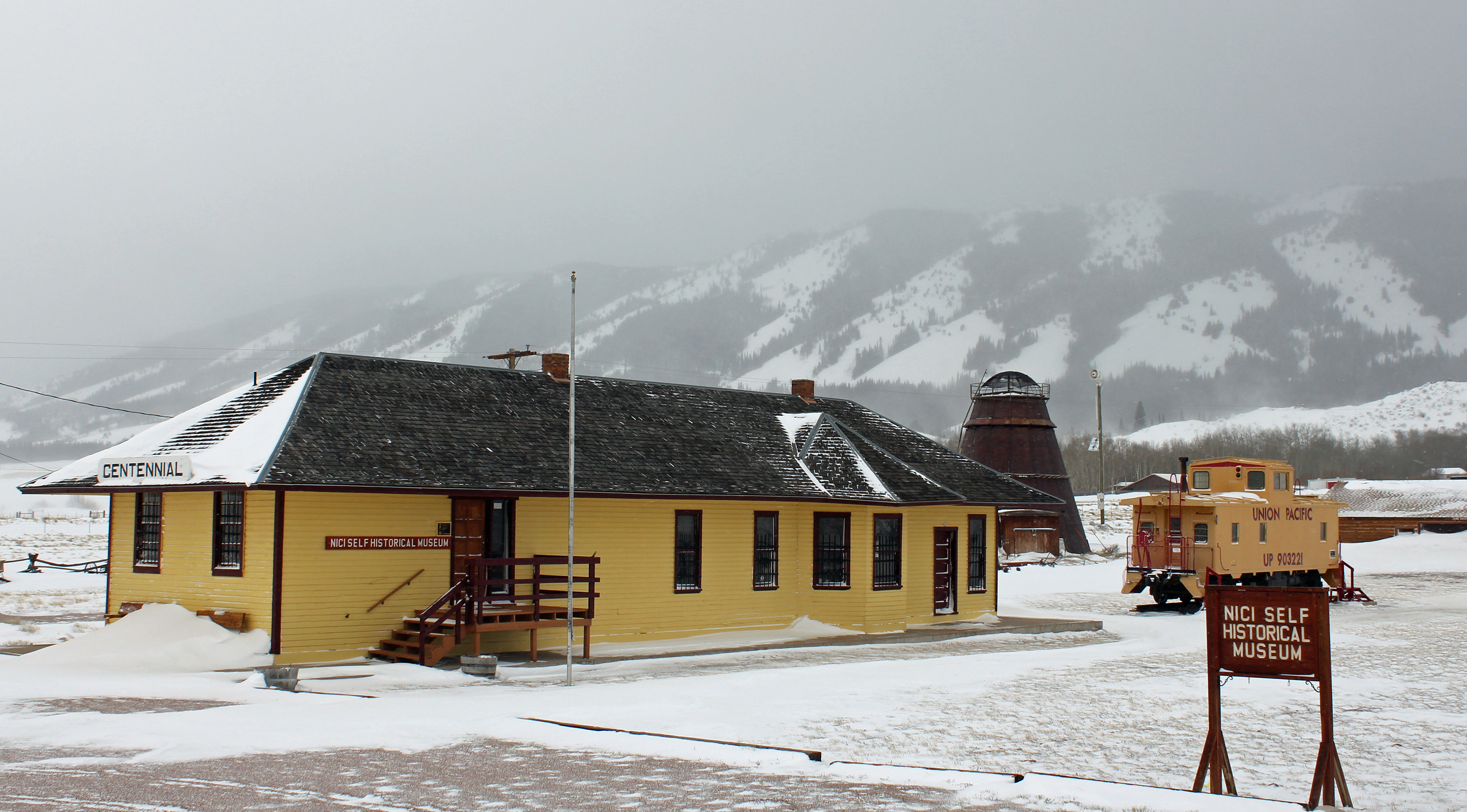
- The old Union Pacific depot in Centennial, now a museum.

- Location in Albany County and the state of Wyoming
- Coordinates: 41°17′53″N 106°07′15″W
- Country: United States
- State: Wyoming
- County: Albany

Area
  - Total: 16.3 sq mi (42 km^{2})
  - Land: 16.3 sq mi (42 km^{2})
  - Water: 0.0 sq mi (0 km^{2})
- Elevation: 8,074 ft (2,461 m)

Population (2020)
  - Total: 283
  - Density: 17.4/sq mi (6.70/km^{2})
- Time zone: UTC-7 (Mountain (MST))
  - Summer (DST): UTC-6 (MDT)
- ZIP code: 82055
- Area code: 307
- FIPS code: 56-13440
- GNIS feature ID: 2408002

Centennial is a census-designated place in Albany County, Wyoming, United States. The population was 283 at the 2020 census.

== History ==
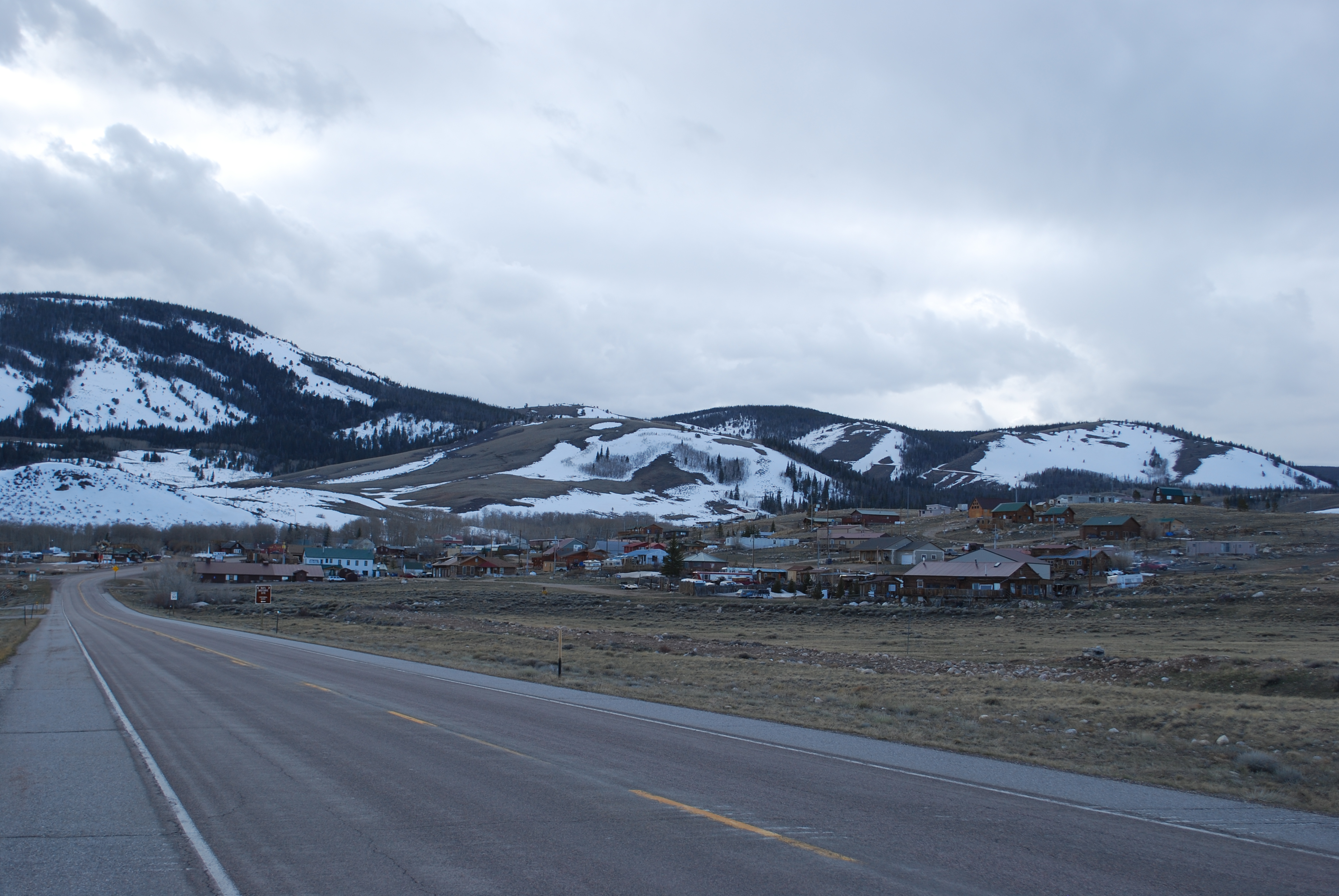
Wyoming 130 facing Centennial.

As the Union Pacific Railroad was pushing west to link up with the Central Pacific Railroad, as part of the First transcontinental railroad, they sent logging crews into the Snowy Range, in the Medicine Bow Mountains, to cut down timber (mainly Lodgepole Pine) for railroad ties. A work camp was built on the site of the town. After they had completed most of their work and the workers started having conflicts with area Native Americans, the crews left the area. After the area was opened to homesteaders a few ranchers returned to the area.

Men working for I. P. Lambing (superintendent at the mine) of Golden, Colorado and Colonel Stephen W. Downey (a lawyer and president of what would become Centennial Gold Mining Company) of Laramie, Wyoming, discovered gold on what would become Centennial Ridge on Centennial Mountain in 1875. As miners and prospectors started coming to the area, to work the Centennial Mine (also called the Downey Lode and Centennial Vein), they reestablished a community on the old work camp site in 1876 and named the town Centennial in honor of the 100th anniversary of the signing of the Declaration of Independence and founding of the United States. Most of the gold was stripped from the mines by 1877, but the town was now established and merchants who came to serve the miners stayed to serve the nearby ranchers.

On the west side of Centennial Ridge a copper claim was discovered by Jacob Schnitzler in 1896.

Gold had people coming to the area again in 1902, and again in 1923–1924, but no significant amount was ever found. Loggers returned to the area in 1905 to cut timber for a coal mine near Coalmont in Jackson County, Colorado. Acme Consolidated Gold & Mining Company, headed by Isaac Van Horn, bought up timber land around the town, the townsite (Interstate Town Site Company), opened a sawmill, a planing mill and lumber yard, and opened a newspaper, the Centennial Post. The partners in Acme Consolidated Gold & Mining Company, Van Horn, Fred A. Miller, and Edward R. Miller, also formed the Laramie, Hahns Peak and Pacific Railway to transport the coal out to eastern markets. The railroad, originating in Laramie, reached Centennial on June 17, 1907 (it would finally reach Coalmont in 1911). That same year a bank was founded.

A. J. Hull, Jesse Northrop, and B. F. Northrop located the Platinum Queen (aka Queen Mine) on September 23, 1923, approximately 2.3 miles southwest of Centennial, on Centennial Ridge. Most activity around the mine area ceased after the Stock Market Crash of 1929 and the advent of the Great Depression.

== Geography ==
According to the United States Census Bureau, the CDP has a total area of 16.3 square miles (42.2 km^{2}), all land.

=== Climate ===
Climate data for Centennial, Wyoming, 1991–2020 normals, extremes 1899–2010
Month	Jan	Feb	Mar	Apr	May	Jun	Jul	Aug	Sep	Oct	Nov	Dec	Year
Record high °F (°C)	59 (15)	57 (14)	66 (19)	74 (23)	83 (28)	91 (33)	95 (35)	90 (32)	89 (32)	77 (25)	72 (22)	63 (17)	95 (35)
Mean daily maximum °F (°C)	34.0 (1.1)	35.3 (1.8)	42.7 (5.9)	50.2 (10.1)	60.5 (15.8)	71.2 (21.8)	76.5 (24.7)	74.6 (23.7)	67.5 (19.7)	55.5 (13.1)	42.6 (5.9)	33.7 (0.9)	53.7 (12.0)
Daily mean °F (°C)	23.2 (−4.9)	23.9 (−4.5)	30.6 (−0.8)	36.9 (2.7)	46.1 (7.8)	56.1 (13.4)	62.4 (16.9)	60.3 (15.7)	53.2 (11.8)	41.6 (5.3)	30.3 (−0.9)	23.2 (−4.9)	40.7 (4.8)
Mean daily minimum °F (°C)	12.4 (−10.9)	12.5 (−10.8)	18.4 (−7.6)	23.5 (−4.7)	31.6 (−0.2)	41.0 (5.0)	48.2 (9.0)	45.9 (7.7)	38.8 (3.8)	27.7 (−2.4)	17.9 (−7.8)	12.7 (−10.7)	27.6 (−2.5)
Record low °F (°C)	−45 (−43)	−34 (−37)	−23 (−31)	−15 (−26)	2 (−17)	19 (−7)	26 (−3)	26 (−3)	6 (−14)	−6 (−21)	−23 (−31)	−40 (−40)	−45 (−43)
Average precipitation inches (mm)	0.94 (24)	0.81 (21)	1.08 (27)	1.37 (35)	1.53 (39)	1.33 (34)	1.67 (42)	1.10 (28)	1.25 (32)	0.87 (22)	1.02 (26)	0.99 (25)	13.96 (355)
Average snowfall inches (cm)	10.9 (28)	14.7 (37)	15.8 (40)	15.0 (38)	7.3 (19)	0.4 (1.0)	0.0 (0.0)	0.0 (0.0)	2.8 (7.1)	7.2 (18)	19.1 (49)	15.2 (39)	108.4 (276.1)
Average precipitation days (≥ 0.01 in)	7.2	7.0	8.4	8.4	9.8	7.7	8.9	9.0	6.9	5.5	7.1	7.5	93.4
Average snowy days (≥ 0.1 in)	7.2	7.1	7.4	6.6	2.9	0.2	0.0	0.0	0.9	2.9	6.7	7.1	49.0
Source 1: NOAA (precip/precip days, snow/snow days 1981–2010)
Source 2: XMACIS2

== Demographics ==
As of the census of 2000, there were 191 people, 97 households, and 57 families residing in the CDP. The population density was 19.1 people per square mile (7.4/km^{2}). There were 295 housing units at an average density of 29.4/sq mi (11.4/km^{2}). The racial makeup of the CDP was 95.29% White, 1.05% Native American, 1.05% Asian, and 2.62% from two or more races. Hispanic or Latino of any race were 3.14% of the population.

There were 97 households, out of which 15.5% had children under the age of 18 living with them, 50.5% were married couples living together, 2.1% had a female householder with no husband present, and 41.2% were non-families. 30.9% of all households were made up of individuals, and 5.2% had someone living alone who was 65 years of age or older. The average household size was 1.97 and the average family size was 2.44.

In the CDP, the population was spread out, with 13.1% under the age of 18, 3.1% from 18 to 24, 23.0% from 25 to 44, 44.0% from 45 to 64, and 16.8% who were 65 years of age or older. The median age was 48 years. For every 100 females, there were 130.1 males. For every 100 females age 18 and over, there were 115.6 males.

The median income for a household in the CDP was $32,292, and the median income for a family was $45,417. Males had a median income of $57,292 versus $37,969 for females. The per capita income for the CDP was $29,477. About 15.9% of families and 13.3% of the population were below the poverty line, including 100.0% of those under the age of eighteen and none of those 65 or over.

== Education ==
Public education in the community of Centennial is provided by Albany County School District #1.

Centennial has a public library, a branch of the Albany County Public Library.
