= Hymns of the Church of Jesus Christ of Latter-day Saints (1985 book) =

Hymnal of the Church of Jesus Christ of Latter-day Saints

- Language: English
- Publisher: The Church of Jesus Christ of Latter-day Saints
- Publication date: 1985; 2nd ed. 1998 revised in 2002
- Publication place: United States
- Pages: 434
- ISBN: 9780875790138
- Followed by: Hymns—for Home and Church

Hymns of the Church of Jesus Christ of Latter-day Saints is the official hymnal of the Church of Jesus Christ of Latter-day Saints (LDS Church). Published in English in 1985, and later in many other languages, it is used throughout the LDS Church. This article refers to the English version. The book was published on the 150th anniversary of the publication of the first Latter-day Saint hymnbook, compiled by Emma Smith in 1835. Previous hymnbooks used by the church include The Manchester Hymnal (1840), The Psalmody (1889), Songs of Zion (1908), Hymns (1927), and Hymns (1948).

On June 18, 2018, the church announced that updated versions of the hymnbook and the Children's Songbook would be created, by soliciting feedback for a one-year period concluding in July 2019. This culminated in having unified versions of the books in languages used by congregations worldwide, with the same numbering system.

== Organization ==
The book contains a table of contents, followed by a preface with a message from the church's First Presidency, which encourages church members to use the hymn book at meetings and in their homes to invite the spirit and to teach doctrine.

The hymn section is divided into thematic groups:

1–61: Restoration
Number	Hymn	Words	Music	Notes
1	"The Morning Breaks"	Parley P. Pratt	George Careless	
2	"The Spirit of God"	William W. Phelps	Anon.	
3	"Now Let Us Rejoice"	William W. Phelps	Henry Tucker	
4	"Truth Eternal"	Parley P. Pratt	Alexander Schreiner	
5	"High on the Mountain Top"	Joel H. Johnson	Ebenezer Beesley	
6	"Redeemer of Israel"	Joseph Swain	Freeman Lewis	Adapt.: William W. Phelps
7	"Israel, Israel, God Is Calling"	Richard Smyth	Charles C. Converse	
8	"Awake and Arise"	Theodore E. Curtis	Carolee Curtis Green	
9	"Come, Rejoice"	Tracy Y. Cannon	Tracy Y. Cannon	
10	"Come, Sing to the Lord"	Gerrit de Jong Jr.	Gerrit de Jong Jr.	
11	"What Was Witnessed in the Heavens?"	John S. Davis	Evan Stephens	
12	"'Twas Witnessed in the Morning Sky"	Anon.	H. Walford Davies	Adapt.: G. William Richards
13	"An Angel from on High"	Parley P. Pratt	John E. Tullidge	
14	"Sweet Is the Peace the Gospel Brings"	Mary Ann Morton	Alfred M. Durham	
15	"I Saw a Mighty Angel Fly"	Anon.	English melody	Arr.: Ralph Vaughan Williams
16	"What Glorious Scenes Mine Eyes Behold"	Anon.	Ebenezer Beesley	
17	"Awake, Ye Saints of God, Awake!"	Eliza R. Snow	Evan Stephens	
18	"The Voice of God Again Is Heard"	Evan Stephens	Evan Stephens	
19	"We Thank Thee, O God, for a Prophet"	William Fowler	Caroline E. Sheridan Norton	
20	"God of Power, God of Right"	Wallace F. Bennett	Tracy Y. Cannon	
21	"Come, Listen to a Prophet's Voice"	Joseph S. Murdock; Bruce R. McConkie	Joseph J. Daynes	
22	"We Listen to a Prophet's Voice"	Marylou Cunningham Leavitt	Darwin K. Wolford	
23	"We Ever Pray for Thee"	Evan Stephens	Henry A. Tuckett	Adapt.: Evan Stephens
24	"God Bless Our Prophet Dear"	Bernard Snow	Harry A. Dean	
25	"Now We'll Sing with One Accord"	William W. Phelps	Joseph J. Daynes	
26	"Joseph Smith's First Prayer"	George A. Manwaring	Sylvanus Billings Pond	Adapt.: A. C. Smyth
27	"Praise to the Man"	William W. Phelps	Scottish folk song	
28	"Saints, Behold How Great Jehovah"	Douglas W. Stott	A. Laurence Lyon	
29	"A Poor Wayfaring Man of Grief"	James Montgomery	George Coles	
30	"Come, Come, Ye Saints"	William Clayton	English folk song	
31	"O God, Our Help in Ages Past"	Isaac Watts	William Croft	
32	"The Happy Day at Last Has Come"	Philo Dibble	Ebenezer Beesley	
33	"Our Mountain Home So Dear"	Emmeline B. Wells	Evan Stephens	
34	"O Ye Mountains High"	Charles W. Penrose	H. S. Thompson	
35	"For the Strength of the Hills"	Felicia D. Hemans	Evan Stephens	Adapt.: Edward L. Sloan
36	"They, the Builders of the Nation"	Ida Romney Alldredge	Alfred M. Durham	
37	"The Wintry Day, Descending to Its Close"	Orson F. Whitney	Edward P. Kimball	
38	"Come, All Ye Saints of Zion"	William W. Phelps	John E. Tullidge	
39	"O Saints of Zion"	Ed M. Rowe	Robert P. Manookin	
40	"Arise, O Glorious Zion"	William G. Mills	George Careless	
41	"Let Zion in Her Beauty Rise"	Edward Partridge	Anon.	
42	"Hail to the Brightness of Zion's Glad Morning!"	Thomas Hastings	Edwin F. Parry	
43	"Zion Stands with Hills Surrounded"	Thomas Kelly	A. C. Smyth	
44	"Beautiful Zion, Built Above"	George Gill	Joseph G. Fones	
45	"Lead Me into Life Eternal"	John A. Widtsoe	Alexander Schreiner	
46	"Glorious Things of Thee Are Spoken"	John Newton	Franz Joseph Haydn	
47	"We Will Sing of Zion"	Merrill Bradshaw	Merrill Bradshaw	
48	"Glorious Things Are Sung of Zion"	William W. Phelps	Dutch melody	
49	"Adam-ondi-Ahman"	William W. Phelps	Anon.	
50	"Come, Thou Glorious Day of Promise"	Anon.	A. C. Smyth	
51	"Sons of Michael, He Approaches"	Elias L. T. Harrison	Darwin K. Wolford	
52	"The Day Dawn Is Breaking"	Joseph L. Townsend	William Clayson	
53	"Let Earth's Inhabitants Rejoice"	William Clegg	Leroy J. Robertson	
54	"Behold, the Mountain of the Lord"	Michael Bruce	Leland B. Sateren	
55	"Lo, the Mighty God Appearing!"	William Goode	Evan Stephens	
56	"Softly Beams the Sacred Dawning"	John Jaques	J. Spencer Cornwall	
57	"We're Not Ashamed to Own Our Lord"	William W. Phelps	John Longhurst	
58	"Come, Ye Children of the Lord"	James H. Wallis	Spanish melody	Arr.: Benjamin Carr
59	"Come, O Thou King of Kings"	Parley P. Pratt	H. Tucker	
60	"Battle Hymn of the Republic"	Julia Ward Howe	Anon.	
61	"Raise Your Voices to the Lord"	Evan Stephens	Evan Stephens	

62–96: Praise and Thanksgiving
Number	Hymn	Words	Music	Notes
62	"All Creatures of Our God and King"	St. Francis of Assisi	German hymn	Trans.: William H. Draper; Arr.: Ralph Vaughan Williams
63	"Great King of Heaven"	Carrie Stockdale Thomas	Leroy J. Robertson	
64	"On This Day of Joy and Gladness"	Leroy J. Robertson	Leroy J. Robertson	
65	"Come, All Ye Saints Who Dwell on Earth"	William W. Phelps	William B. Bradbury	
66	"Rejoice, the Lord Is King!"	Charles Wesley	Horatio Parker	
67	"Glory to God on High"	James Allen	Felice de Giardini	
68	"A Mighty Fortress Is Our God"	Martin Luther	Martin Luther	
69	"All Glory, Laud, and Honor"	Theodulph of Orleans	Melchior Teschner	
70	"Sing Praise to Him"	Johann J. Schütz	Bohemian Brethren's Songbook	Trans.: Frances Elizabeth Cox (from German)
71	"With Songs of Praise"	Penelope Moody Allen	Newel Kay Brown	
72	"Praise to the Lord, the Almighty"	Joachim Neander	Stralsund Gesangbuch	Trans.: Catherine Winkworth (from German); Arr.: William S. Bennett, Otto Goldschmidt
73	"Praise the Lord with Heart and Voice"	Tracy Y. Cannon	Tracy Y. Cannon	
74	"Praise Ye the Lord"	Isaac Watts	Evan Stephens	
75	"In Hymns of Praise"	Ada Blenkhorn	Alfred Beirly	
76	"God of Our Fathers, We Come unto Thee"	Charles W. Penrose	Ebenezer Beesley	
77	"Great Is the Lord"	Eliza R. Snow	Ebenezer Beesley	
78	"God of Our Fathers, Whose Almighty Hand"	Daniel C. Roberts	George W. Warren	
79	"With All the Power of Heart and Tongue"	Isaac Watts	Lowell M. Durham	
80	"God of Our Fathers, Known of Old"	Rudyard Kipling	Leroy J. Robertson	
81	"Press Forward, Saints"	Marvin K. Gardner	Vanja Y. Watkins	
82	"For All the Saints"	William Walsham How	Ralph Vaughan Williams	
83	"Guide Us, O Thou Great Jehovah"	William Williams	John Hughes	Trans.: Peter Williams; William Williams(from Welsh)
84	"Faith of Our Fathers"	Frederick W. Faber	Henri F. Hemy; James G. Walton	
85	"How Firm a Foundation"	Robert Keen	J. Ellis	
86	"How Great Thou Art"	Carl Boberg; Stuart K. Hine	Traditional Swedish folk tune	Trans.: Stuart K. Hine (from Swedish); Arr.: Stuart K. Hine
87	"God Is Love"	Thomas R. Taylor	Thomas C. Griggs	
88	"Great God, Attend While Zion Sings"	Isaac Watts	Joseph J. Daynes	
89	"The Lord Is My Light"	James Nicholson	John R. Sweney	
90	"From All That Dwell below the Skies"	Isaac Watts	John Hatton	
91	"Father, Thy Children to Thee Now Raise"	Evan Stephens	Evan Stephens	
92	"For the Beauty of the Earth"	Folliott S. Pierpoint	Conrad Kocher	
93	"Prayer of Thanksgiving"	Anon.; Adriaen Valerius	Dutch folk song; Frans Heijdemann	Trans.: Theodore Baker (from Dutch); Arr.: Edward Kremser
94	"Come, Ye Thankful People"	Henry Alford	George J. Elvey	
95	"Now Thank We All Our God"	Martin Rinkhart	Johann Crüger	Trans.: Catherine Winkworth (from German)
96	"Dearest Children, God Is Near You"	Charles L. Walker	John Menzies Macfarlane	

97–168: Prayer and Supplication
Number	Hymn	Words	Music	Notes
97	"Lead, Kindly Light"	John Henry Newman	John B. Dykes	
98	"I Need Thee Every Hour"	Annie S. Hawks	Robert Lowry	
99	"Nearer, Dear Savior, to Thee"	Joseph L. Townsend	William Clayson	
100	"Nearer, My God, to Thee"	Sarah F. Adams	Lowell Mason	
101	"Guide Me to Thee"	Orson Pratt Huish	Orson Pratt Huish	
102	"Jesus, Lover of My Soul"	Charles Wesley	Joseph P. Holbrook	
103	"Precious Savior, Dear Redeemer"	H. R. Palmer	H. R. Palmer	
104	"Jesus, Savior, Pilot Me"	Edward Hopper	John Edgar Gould	
105	"Master, the Tempest Is Raging"	Mary Ann Baker	H. R. Palmer	
106	"God Speed the Right"	William E. Hickson	Ernst Moritz Arndt	
107	"Lord, Accept Our True Devotion"	Richard Alldridge	Joseph J. Daynes	
108	"The Lord Is My Shepherd"	James Montgomery	Thomas Koschat	
109	"The Lord My Pasture Will Prepare"	Joseph Addison	Dmitri Bortniansky	
110	"Cast Thy Burden upon the Lord"	Julius Schubring	Felix Mendelssohn	
111	"Rock of Ages"	Augustus M. Toplady	Thomas Hastings	
112	"Savior, Redeemer of My Soul"	Orson F. Whitney	Harry A. Dean	
113	"Our Savior's Love"	Edward L. Hart	Crawford Gates	
114	"Come unto Him"	Theodore E. Curtis	Hugh W. Dougall	
115	"Come, Ye Disconsolate"	Thomas Moore; Thomas Hastings	Samuel Webbe	
116	"Come, Follow Me"	John Nicholson	Samuel McBurney	
117	"Come unto Jesus"	Orson Pratt Huish	Orson Pratt Huish	
118	"Ye Simple Souls Who Stray"	Charles Wesley	Evan Stephens	
119	"Come, We That Love the Lord"	Isaac Watts	Aaron Williams	
120	"Lean on My Ample Arm"	Theodore E. Curtis	Evan Stephens	
121	"I'm a Pilgrim, I'm a Stranger"	Hans Henry Petersen	Leroy J. Robertson	
122	"Though Deepening Trials"	Eliza R. Snow	George Careless	
123	"Oh, May My Soul Commune with Thee"	Lorin F. Wheelwright	Lorin F. Wheelwright	
124	"Be Still, My Soul"	Katharina von Schlegel	Jean Sibelius	Trans.: Jane L. Borthwick (from German)
125	"How Gentle God's Commands"	Philip Doddridge	Hans Georg Nägeli	Arr.: Lowell Mason
126	"How Long, O Lord Most Holy and True"	John A. Widtsoe	B. Cecil Gates	
127	"Does the Journey Seem Long?"	Joseph Fielding Smith	George D. Pyper	
128	"When Faith Endures"	Naomi Ward Randall	Stephen M. Jones	
129	"Where Can I Turn for Peace?"	Emma Lou Thayne	Joleen Grant Meredith	
130	"Be Thou Humble"	Grietje Terburg Rowley	Grietje Terburg Rowley	
131	"More Holiness Give Me"	Philip Paul Bliss	Philip Paul Bliss	
132	"God Is in His Holy Temple"	Samuel Woodworth	Frank W. Asper	
133	"Father in Heaven"	Angus S. Hibbard	Friedrich F. Flemming	Arr.: Edwin P. Parker
134	"I Believe in Christ"	Bruce R. McConkie	John Longhurst	
135	"My Redeemer Lives"	Gordon B. Hinckley	G. Homer Durham	
136	"I Know That My Redeemer Lives"	Samuel Medley	Lewis D. Edwards	
137	"Testimony"	Loren C. Dunn	Michael Finlinson Moody	
138	"Bless Our Fast, We Pray"	John Sears Tanner	James B. Welch	
139	"In Fasting We Approach Thee"	Paul L. Anderson	Clay Christiansen	
140	"Did You Think to Pray?"	Mary Ann Pepper Kidder	William O. Perkins	
141	"Jesus, the Very Thought of Thee"	Bernard of Clairvaux	John B. Dykes	Trans.: Edward Caswall (from Latin)
142	"Sweet Hour of Prayer"	William W. Walford	William B. Bradbury	
143	"Let the Holy Spirit Guide"	Penelope Moody Allen	Martin Shaw	
144	"Secret Prayer"	Hans Henry Petersen	Hans Henry Petersen	
145	"Prayer Is the Soul's Sincere Desire"	James Montgomery	George Careless	
146	"Gently Raise the Sacred Strain"	William W. Phelps	Thomas C. Griggs	
147	"Sweet Is the Work"	Isaac Watts	John J. McClellan	
148	"Sabbath Day"	Paul L. Anderson	Lynn R. Carson	
149	"As the Dew from Heaven Distilling"	Thomas Kelly	Joseph J. Daynes	
150	"O Thou Kind and Gracious Father"	Charles Denney Jr.	George Careless	
151	"We Meet, Dear Lord"	Vernald W. Johns	Laurence M. Yorgason	
152	"God Be with You Till We Meet Again"	Jeremiah E. Rankin	William G. Tomer	
153	"Lord, We Ask Thee Ere We Part"	George A. Manwaring	Benjamin Milgrove	Arr.: Ebenezer Beesley
154	"Father, This Hour Has Been One of Joy"	Nan Greene Hunter	Lynn R. Shurtleff	
155	"We Have Partaken of Thy Love"	Mabel Jones Gabbott	Robert P. Manookin	
156	"Sing We Now at Parting"	George A. Manwaring	Ebenezer Beesley	
157	"Thy Spirit, Lord, Has Stirred Our Souls"	Frank I. Kooyman	Alexander Schreiner	
158	"Before Thee, Lord, I Bow My Head"	Joseph H. Dean	Joseph H. Dean	
159	"Now the Day Is Over"	Sabine Baring-Gould	Joseph Barnby	
160	"Softly Now the Light of Day"	George W. Doane	Carl Maria von Weber	Arr.: Henry Greatorix
161	"The Lord Be with Us"	John Ellerton	Tracy Y. Cannon	
162	"Lord, We Come Before Thee Now"	William Hammond	Harry A. Dean	
163	"Lord, Dismiss Us with Thy Blessing"	John Fawcett; Walter Shirley	Jean-Jacques Rousseau	
164	"Great God, to Thee My Evening Song"	Anne Steele	Edward P. Kimball	
165	"Abide with Me; 'Tis Eventide"	M. Lowrie Hofford	Harrison Millard	
166	"Abide with Me!"	Henry F. Lyte	William H. Monk	
167	"Come, Let Us Sing an Evening Hymn"	William W. Phelps	Tracy Y. Cannon	
168	"As the Shadows Fall"	Lowell M. Durham Jr.	Lowell M. Durham	

169–196: Sacrament
Number	Hymn	Words	Music	Notes
169	"As Now We Take the Sacrament"	Lee Tom Perry	Daniel Lyman Carter	
170	"God, Our Father, Hear Us Pray"	Annie Pinnock Malin	Louis M. Gottschalk	Adapt.: Edwin P. Parker
171	"With Humble Heart"	Zara Sabin	Thomas L. Durham	
172	"In Humility, Our Savior"	Mabel Jones Gabbott	Rowland H. Prichard	
173	"While of These Emblems We Partake" (Saul)	John Nicholson	Samuel McBurney	
174	"While of These Emblems We Partake" (Aeolian)	John Nicholson	Alexander Schreiner	
175	"O God, the Eternal Father"	William W. Phelps	Felix Mendelssohn	
176	"'Tis Sweet to Sing the Matchless Love" (Meredith)	George A. Manwaring	Frank W. Asper	
177	"'Tis Sweet to Sing the Matchless Love" (Hancock)	George A. Manwaring	Ebenezer Beesley	
178	"O Lord of Hosts"	Andrew Dalrymple	George Careless	
179	"Again, Our Dear Redeeming Lord"	Theodore E. Curtis	Alfred M. Durham	
180	"Father in Heaven, We Do Believe"	Parley P. Pratt	Jane Romney Crawford	
181	"Jesus of Nazareth, Savior and King"	Hugh W. Dougall	Hugh W. Dougall	
182	"We'll Sing All Hail to Jesus' Name"	Richard Alldridge	Joseph Coslett	
183	"In Remembrance of Thy Suffering"	Evan Stephens	Evan Stephens	
184	"Upon the Cross of Calvary"	Vilate Raile	Leroy J. Robertson	
185	"Reverently and Meekly Now"	Joseph L. Townsend	Ebenezer Beesley	
186	"Again We Meet around the Board"	Eliza R. Snow	George Careless	
187	"God Loved Us, So He Sent His Son"	Edward P. Kimball	Alexander Schreiner	
188	"Thy Will, O Lord, Be Done"	Frank I. Kooyman	Robert P. Manookin	
189	"O Thou, Before the World Began"	Charles Wesley	Frank W. Asper	
190	"In Memory of the Crucified"	Frank I. Kooyman	Alexander Schreiner	
191	"Behold the Great Redeemer Die"	Eliza R. Snow	George Careless	
192	"He Died! The Great Redeemer Died"	Isaac Watts	George Careless	
193	"I Stand All Amazed"	Charles H. Gabriel	Charles H. Gabriel	
194	"There is a Green Hill Far Away"	Cecil Frances Alexander	John H. Gower	
195	"How Great the Wisdom and the Love"	Eliza R. Snow	Thomas McIntyre	
196	"Jesus, Once of Humble Birth"	Parley P. Pratt	Giacomo Meyerbeer; English Chorister	

197–200: Easter
Number	Hymn	Words	Music	Notes
197	"O Savior, Thou Who Wearest a Crown"	Paul Gerhardt	Hans Leo Hassler	Trans.: Karen Lynn Davidson (from German); Adapt.: Johann Sebastian Bach
198	"That Easter Morn"	Marion D. Hanks	Robert Cundick	
199	"He Is Risen!"	Cecil Frances Alexander	Joachim Neander	
200	"Christ the Lord Is Risen Today"	Charles Wesley	Lyra Davidica	

201–214: Christmas
Number	Hymn	Words	Music	Notes
201	"Joy to the World"	Isaac Watts; William W. Phelps	George F. Handel; Lowell Mason	Adapt.: William W. Phelps
202	"Oh, Come, All Ye Faithful"	John F. Wade	John F. Wade	Trans.: Frederick Oakeley (from Latin)
203	"Angels We Have Heard on High"	French carol	French carol	Trans.: James Chadwick (from French)
204	"Silent Night"	Joseph Mohr	Franz Gruber	Trans.: John F. Young (from German)
205	"Once in Royal David's City"	Cecil Frances Alexander	Henry J. Gauntlett	
206	"Away in a Manger"	Martin Luther (See Spurious)	William J. Kirkpatrick	Arr.: Rosalee Elser
207	"It Came upon the Midnight Clear"	Edmund H. Sears	Richard S. Willis	
208	"O Little Town of Bethlehem"	Phillips Brooks	Lewis H. Redner	
209	"Hark! The Herald Angels Sing"	Charles Wesley	Felix Mendelssohn	
210	"With Wondering Awe"	Anon.	Anon.	
211	"While Shepherds Watched Their Flocks"	Nahum Tate	Yorkshire carol	
212	"Far, Far Away on Judea's Plains"	John Menzies Macfarlane	John Menzies Macfarlane	
213	"The First Noel"	Traditional English carol	Traditional English carol	
214	"I Heard the Bells on Christmas Day"	Henry Wadsworth Longfellow	John Baptiste Calkin	

215–298: Special Topics
Number	Hymn	Words	Music	Notes
215	"Ring Out, Wild Bells"	Alfred Tennyson	Crawford Gates	
216	"We Are Sowing"	Anon.	Henry A. Tuckett	
217	"Come, Let Us Anew"	Charles Wesley	James Lucas	
218	"We Give Thee But Thine Own"	William Walsham How	Anon.; Cantica Laudis	Arr.: Lowell Mason; George J. Webb
219	"Because I Have Been Given Much"	Grace Noll Crowell	Phillip Landgrave	
220	"Lord, I Would Follow Thee"	Susan Evans McCloud	K. Newell Dayley	
221	"Dear to the Heart of the Shepherd"	Mary B. Wingate	William J. Kirkpatrick	
222	"Hear Thou Our Hymn, O Lord"	Frank W. Asper	Frank W. Asper	
223	"Have I Done Any Good?"	Will L. Thompson	Will L. Thompson	
224	"I Have Work Enough to Do"	Josephine Pollard	William J. Kirkpatrick	
225	"We Are Marching On to Glory"	John M. Chamberlain	John M. Chamberlain	
226	"Improve the Shining Moments"	Robert B. Baird	Robert B. Baird	
227	"There Is Sunshine in My Soul Today"	Eliza E. Hewitt	John R. Sweney	
228	"You Can Make the Pathway Bright"	Helen Silcott Dungan	James M. Dungan	
229	"Today, While the Sun Shines"	Luella Clark	Evan Stephens	
230	"Scatter Sunshine"	Lanta Wilson Smith	Edwin O. Excell	
231	"Father, Cheer Our Souls Tonight"	Ellis Reynolds Shipp	Orlando Gibbons	
232	"Let Us Oft Speak Kind Words"	Joseph L. Townsend	Ebenezer Beesley	
233	"Nay, Speak No Ill"	Charles Swain	Anon.	
234	"Jesus, Mighty King in Zion"	John Fellows	Tracy Y. Cannon	
235	"Should You Feel Inclined to Censure"	Anon.	Philip Paul Bliss	
236	"Lord, Accept into Thy Kingdom"	Mabel Jones Gabbott	Alexander Schreiner	
237	"Do What Is Right"	Anon.; J. C. S.	George Kiallmark	
238	"Behold Thy Sons and Daughters, Lord"	Parley P. Pratt	Alexander Schreiner	
239	"Choose the Right"	Joseph L. Townsend	Henry A. Tuckett	
240	"Know This, That Every Soul Is Free"	Joseph Proud	Roger L. Miller	
241	"Count Your Blessings"	Johnson Oatman Jr.	Edwin O. Excell	
242	"Praise God, from Whom All Blessings Flow"	Thomas Ken	Louis Bourgeois; Genevan Psalter	
243	"Let Us All Press On"	Evan Stephens	Evan Stephens	
244	"Come Along, Come Along"	William Willes	A. C. Smyth	
245	"This House We Dedicate to Thee"	Henry W. Naisbitt	Frank W. Asper	
246	"Onward, Christian Soldiers"	Sabine Baring-Gould	Arthur S. Sullivan	
247	"We Love Thy House, O God"	William Bullock	Leroy J. Robertson	
248	"Up, Awake, Ye Defenders of Zion"	Charles W. Penrose	Thomas E. Williams; Thomas A. Becket Sr.	
249	"Called to Serve"	Elsie Duncan Yale	Adam Geibel	
250	"We Are All Enlisted"	Anon.	William B. Bradbury	
251	"Behold! A Royal Army"	Fanny J. Crosby	Adam Geibel	
252	"Put Your Shoulder to the Wheel"	Will L. Thompson	Will L. Thompson	
253	"Like Ten Thousand Legions Marching"	Jean L. Kaberry	Robert P. Manookin	
254	"True to the Faith"	Evan Stephens	Evan Stephens	
255	"Carry On"	Ruth May Fox	Alfred M. Durham	
256	"As Zion's Youth in Latter Days"	Susan Evans McCloud	Irish melody	
257	"Rejoice! A Glorious Sound Is Heard"	W. O. Robinson	Frank W. Asper	
258	"O Thou Rock of Our Salvation"	Joseph L. Townsend	William Clayson	
259	"Hope of Israel"	Joseph L. Townsend	William Clayson	
260	"Who's on the Lord's Side?"	Hannah Last Cornaby	Henry H. Russell	
261	"Thy Servants Are Prepared"	Marilyn McMeen Brown	Willy Reske	
262	"Go, Ye Messengers of Glory"	John Taylor	Leroy J. Robertson	
263	"Go Forth with Faith"	Ruth Muir Gardner	Lyall J. Gardner	
264	"Hark, All Ye Nations!"	Louis F. Mönch	George F. Root	
265	"Arise, O God, and Shine"	William Hurn	John Darwall	
266	"The Time Is Far Spent"	Eliza R. Snow	German folk song	
267	"How Wondrous and Great"	Henry U. Onderdonk	Joseph Martin Kraus	
268	"Come, All Whose Souls Are Lighted"	Reginald Heber	Lowell Mason	
269	"Jehovah, Lord of Heaven and Earth"	Joseph Proud	Oliver Holden	
270	"I'll Go Where You Want Me to Go"	Mary M. Brown	Carrie E. Rounsefell	
271	"Oh, Holy Words of Truth and Love"	Joseph L. Townsend	Edwin F. Parry	
272	"Oh Say, What Is Truth?"	John Jaques	Ellen Knowles Melling	
273	"Truth Reflects upon Our Senses"	Anon; Mason Ellis Abbey (refrain)	Charles Davis Tillman	
274	"The Iron Rod"	Joseph L. Townsend	William Clayson	
275	"Men Are That They Might Have Joy"	J. Marinus Jensen	J. J. Keeler	
276	"Come Away to the Sunday School"	Robert B. Baird	Robert B. Baird	
277	"As I Search the Holy Scriptures"	C. Marianne Johnson Fisher	C. Marianne Johnson Fisher	
278	"Thanks for the Sabbath School"	William Willes	James R. Murray	
279	"Thy Holy Word"	Marvin K. Gardner	Robert Cundick	
280	"Welcome, Welcome, Sabbath Morning"	Robert B. Baird	Ebenezer Beesley	
281	"Help Me Teach with Inspiration"	Lorin F. Wheelwright	Lorin F. Wheelwright	
282	"We Meet Again in Sabbath School"	George A. Manwaring	Ebenezer Beesley	
283	"The Glorious Gospel Light Has Shone"	Joel H. Johnson	Gottfried W. Fink	
284	"If You Could Hie to Kolob"	William W. Phelps	English melody	Arr.: Ralph Vaughan Williams
285	"God Moves in a Mysterious Way"	William Cowper	William B. Bradbury	
286	"Oh, What Songs of the Heart"	Joseph L. Townsend	William Clayson	
287	"Rise, Ye Saints, and Temples Enter"	Jean L. Kaberry	Robert P. Manookin	
288	"How Beautiful Thy Temples, Lord"	Frank I. Kooyman	Tracy Y. Cannon	
289	"Holy Temples on Mount Zion"	Archibald F. Bennett	Alexander Schreiner	
290	"Rejoice, Ye Saints of Latter Days"	Mabel Jones Gabbott	R. Paul Thompson	
291	"Turn Your Hearts"	Paul L. Anderson	Gaylen Hatton	
292	"O My Father"	Eliza R. Snow	James McGranahan	
293	"Each Life That Touches Ours for Good"	Karen Lynn Davidson	A. Laurence Lyon	
294	"Love at Home"	John Hugh McNaughton	John Hugh McNaughton	
295	"O Love That Glorifies the Son"	Lorin F. Wheelwright	Lorin F. Wheelwright	
296	"Our Father, by Whose Name"	F. Bland Tucker	John David Edwards	
297	"From Homes of Saints Glad Songs Arise"	Vernald W. Johns	G. William Richards	
298	"Home Can Be a Heaven on Earth"	Carolyn Hamilton Klopfer	W. Herbert Klopfer	

299–308: Children's Songs
Number	Hymn	Words	Music	Notes
299	"Children of Our Heavenly Father"	Caroline V. Sandell-Berg	Traditional Swedish melody	Trans.: Ernst W. Olson (from Swedish)
300	"Families Can Be Together Forever"	Ruth Muir Gardner	Vanja Y. Watkins	
301	"I Am a Child of God"	Naomi Ward Randall	Mildred Tanner Pettit	
302	"I Know My Father Lives"	Reid N. Nibley	Reid N. Nibley	
303	"Keep the Commandments"	Barbara A. McConochie	Barbara A. McConochie	
304	"Teach Me to Walk in the Light"	Clara W. McMaster	Clara W. McMaster	
305	"The Light Divine"	Matilda Watts Cahoon	Mildred Tanner Pettit	
306	"God's Daily Care"	Marie C. Turk	Willy Reske	
307	"In Our Lovely Deseret"	Eliza R. Snow	George F. Root	
308	"Love One Another"	Luacine Clark Fox	Luacine Clark Fox	

309–318: For Women
Number	Hymn	Words	Music	Notes
309	"As Sisters in Zion"	Emily H. Woodmansee	Janice Kapp Perry	
310	"A Key Was Turned in Latter Days"	Jan Underwood Pinborough	Charlene Anderson Newell	
311	"We Meet Again as Sisters"	Paul L. Anderson	Bonnie Lauper Goodliffe	
312	"We Ever Pray for Thee"	Evan Stephens	Henry A. Tuckett	Adapt.: Evan Stephens
313	"God Is Love"	Thomas R. Taylor	Thomas C. Griggs	
314	"How Gentle God's Commands"	Philip Doddridge	Hans Georg Nägeli	Arr.: Lowell Mason
315	"Jesus, the Very Thought of Thee"	Bernard of Clairvaux	John B. Dykes	Trans.: Edward Caswall (from Latin)
316	"The Lord Is My Shepherd"	James Montgomery	Thomas Koschat	
317	"Sweet Is the Work"	Isaac Watts	John J. McClellan	
318	"Love at Home"	John Hugh McNaughton	John Hugh McNaughton	

319–337: For Men
Number	Hymn	Words	Music	Notes
319	"Ye Elders of Israel"	Cyrus H. Wheelock	Thomas H. Bayly	
320	"The Priesthood of Our Lord"	John Craven	John Craven	
321	"Ye Who Are Called to Labor"	Mary Judd Page	Daniel B. Towner	
322	"Come, All Ye Sons of God"	Thomas Davenport	Orson Pratt Huish	
323	"Rise Up, O Men of God" (Choir)	William Pierson Merrill	Frank W. Asper	Arr.: Robert P. Manookin
324	"Rise Up, O Men of God"	William Pierson Merrill	William H. Walter	
325	"See the Mighty Priesthood Gathered" (Choir)	Jean L. Kaberry	Robert P. Manookin	
326	"Come, Come, Ye Saints" (Choir)	William Clayton	English folk song	
327	"Go, Ye Messengers of Heaven" (Choir)	John Taylor	F. Christensen	
328	"An Angel from on High" (Choir)	Parley P. Pratt	John E. Tullidge	
329	"Thy Servants Are Prepared" (Choir)	Marilyn McMeen Brown	Willy Reske	
330	"See, the Mighty Angel Flying" (Choir)	Robert B. Thompson	Evan Stephens	
331	"Oh Say, What Is Truth?" (Choir)	John Jaques	Ellen Knowles Melling	
332	"Come, O Thou King of Kings" (Choir)	Parley P. Pratt	H. Tucker	
333	"High on the Mountain Top" (Choir)	Joel H. Johnson	Ebenezer Beesley	
334	"I Need Thee Every Hour" (Choir)	Annie S. Hawks	Robert Lowry	
335	"Brightly Beams Our Father's Mercy" (Choir)	Philip Paul Bliss	Philip Paul Bliss	
336	"School Thy Feelings" (Choir)	Charles W. Penrose	George F. Root	
337	"O Home Beloved" (Choir)	Evan Stephens	Joseph Parry	

338–341: Patriotic
Number	Hymn	Words	Music	Notes
338	"America the Beautiful"	Katharine Lee Bates	Samuel A. Ward	
339	"My Country, 'Tis of Thee"	Samuel F. Smith	Thesaurus Musicus	
340	"The Star-Spangled Banner"	Francis Scott Key	John Stafford Smith	
341	"God Save the King"	Anon.	Thesaurus Musicus	

Following the hymns, a section titled "Using the Hymnbook" gives helpful information for choristers and accompanists.

Finally, the hymns are listed in multiple indexes according to the authors' and composers' names, hymn titles, tune names, meters, scriptures referenced, etc.

== Format ==
Most of the hymns are arranged in traditional SATB format with treble and bass clefs. The suggested tempo range (in beats per minute) is given, along with an indication of the appropriate mood for the song such as "joyfully," "reflectively," "with vigor," etc. Beneath the hymn are listed the author and composer and their years of birth and death (if applicable), copyright information, and scriptural references.

The book is laid out so that hymns occupying two pages in the book always start on the left. Thus, a page turn is never required in the middle of a hymn.

A few of the hymns have the same text, and even the same title, but are set to different hymn tunes.

== Recordings ==
The church has released recordings of the hymns in CD sets. One set is instrumental only and is sometimes used as accompaniment in church meetings. In the other set, the hymns are sung by a quartet with piano or organ accompaniment.

Many popular singers and instrumentalists, including the Tabernacle Choir at Temple Square, Orchestra at Temple Square and Saints Unified Voices have also recorded arrangements of LDS hymns.

== Languages ==
Many of the hymns have been translated and published in editions designed for use by non-Anglophones. Currently, Latter-day Saint hymnbooks for non-English speaking regions of the world are compiled by beginning with a core group of approximately 100 hymns mandated for all the church's hymnbooks, then a regional committee is given the opportunity to select 50 hymns from a list of suggestions and 50 additional hymns that are deemed to be important to their culture groups. Some of these editions include hymns not found in the English version, such as traditional Christmas carols and patriotic music of the countries where they are used. For example, in the Spanish translation, three hymns originally written by Latter-day Saints in Spanish are included ( “¿Por qué somos?” by Edmund W. Richardson, “Despedida” or “Placentero nos es trabajar” by Andrés C. González, and “La voz, ya, del eterno” or “¡La Proclamación!” by José V. Estrada G.), along with others taken from earlier hymnals or other sources.

The hymn book has been published in several languages, including:

- Albanian
- Bulgarian
- Cambodian
- Chinese
- Danish
- Dutch
- Fijian
- Finnish
- French
- German
- Hungarian
- Icelandic
- Indonesian
- Italian
- Japanese
- Kekchi
- Korean
- Latvian
- Lithuanian
- Norwegian
- Portuguese
- Romanian
- Russian
- Samoan
- Spanish
- Swedish
- Tagalog
- Tahitian
- Thai
- Tongan
- Ukrainian

== See also ==
- Hymns of the Saints, the Community of Christ (former RLDS) hymnal.
- Hymns—for Home and Church, the upcoming successor to the 1985 hymnal.
- Hymns in the Church of Jesus Christ of Latter-day Saints
- Latter Day Saint poetry
- List of English-language hymnals by denomination
