= List of Tabernacle Choir organists =

This list of Tabernacle Choir organists includes those organists who have accompanied the Tabernacle Choir in its performances and who are responsible for the four organs on Temple Square. They also perform daily 30 minute recitals on the Tabernacle Organ. They also provide the organ performances at general conference at the Conference Center just across the street from the Tabernacle, including those parts of general conference with other choirs besides the Tabernacle Choir. The choir currently has a staff of five professional organists:

- Richard Elliott (1991–present) (Principal Organist 2007–present)
- Andrew E. Unsworth (2007–present)
- Brian Mathias (2018–present)
- Linda Margetts (1984–present) (part-time)
- Joseph Peeples (2019–present) (part-time)

Prior organists include:
Joseph J. Daynes (1867–1900)
Katherine Romney Stewart (1900, as assistant organist)
John J. McClellan (1900–1925)
Edward P. Kimball (1905–1937)
Walter J. Poulton (1907–1908)
Tracy Y. Cannon (1909–1930)
Moroni B. Gillespie (1911)
Alexander Schreiner (1924–1977)
Frank W. Asper (1922–1969)
Wade N. Stephens (1933–1944)
Roy M. Darley (1947–1984)
Robert M. Cundick (1965–1991)
John Longhurst (1977–2007)
Bonnie Goodliffe (1979–2019)
Clay Christiansen (organist) (1982–2018)
