= Robert Manookin =

American Latter-day Saint composer

Robert P. Manookin (1918–1997) was a Latter-day Saint composer.

Manookin studied under Frank W. Asper, Alexander Schreiner, B. Cecil Gates and J. Spencer Cornwall.

Manookin held a master's degree from the University of Illinois and a doctorate from the University of Utah. He first moved to Utah County in 1952.

Several of Manookin's works appeared in the 1985 English edition of the LDS hymnbook. Among these were "Thy Will, O Lord, Be Done" (words by Frank I. Kooyman) and "See The Mighty Priesthood Gathered" (words by Jean L. Kaberry). He also wrote the music for Bruce R. McConkie's hymn "In an Upper Room" to be made into a hymn as well as Mabel Jones Gabbott's "The Risen Jesus in America".

Manookin was a professor of music composition and theory at Brigham Young University. He also served as a member of the General Church Music Committee of the LDS Church as well as both chorister and pianist at both the ward and stake levels. He was a stake patriarch in the Orem Suncrest Stake until his death.

In 1980 Manookin served an LDS mission in New Zealand with his wife Helene.
