= Reske =

Reske is a surname. Notable people with the surname include:

- Hans-Joachim Reske (born 1940), German athlete
- Scott Reske (fl. from 1964), American politician
- Willy Reske (1897–1991), organist and composer

== See also ==
- Riske
