= Ida Romney Alldredge =

Mexican-American writer (1892–1943)

Ida Romney Alldredge (January 7, 1892 - June 14, 1943) was a Mexican-American writer born in Colonia Juárez, Chihuahua (Mexico). She was the author of a hymn of the Church of Jesus Christ of Latter-day Saints (LDS Church), They, the Builders of the Nation.

== Biography ==
Ida Romney Alldredge was born in Colonia Juárez, Mexico. She was the daughter of American Latter-day Saint parents, Miles Park Romney and Catherine Cottom. On her father's side, her uncle, George W. Romney, was the governor of Michigan. She married Leo "Lew" Alldredge on August 26, 1911.

Alldredge and her family moved to Douglas, Arizona, in 1912, with other Latter-day Saint settlers, determined to leave Mexico due to the disruptions of the Mexican Revolution. Her husband worked as a merchant in Douglas, and they later moved to Mesa, Arizona, where she remained until her death.

== Poems and hymns ==
Alldredge wrote numerous poems for the LDS Church's Relief Society Magazine and Juvenile Instructor. She wrote more than 400 poems, as well as numerous musical works and some dramatic works. She wrote several lyrics that were translated into songs by contemporaries, such as George Careless, B. Cecil Gates, and William Clive. Alldredge also produced songs for the LDS Church's general conferences, along with those events at the Salt Lake and Mesa temples, including the dedication of the temple in Mesa in 1927. She was best known for Latter-day Saints musical texts, and for the hymn They, the Builders of the Nation, which is included in the church's 1985 LDS Hymnal.
