= Love Is Spoken Here =

Love is Spoken Here

Studio album by Mormon Tabernacle Choir
- Released: 2004

Love is Spoken Here is a 2005 album by the Mormon Tabernacle Choir. The album contains "Songs of Heart and Home" and includes hymns, lullabies, and other assorted songs with orchestral accompaniment directed by Mack Wilberg.

The title song (a children's song) was written by Janice Kapp Perry. Some of the other lyrics were written by Mormon lyricist Jeanne Lawler. In March 2006, the album topped Billboard's Indie Chart for Top Combined Classical Music Albums, and peaked at #11 on the Top Classical Crossover Chart.

== Track list ==
1. "Love is Spoken Here"
2. "For the Beauty of the Earth"
3. "I Feel My Savior's Love"
4. "Our Savior's Love"
5. "All through the Night"
6. "Homeward Bound"
7. "Home Is a Special Kind of Feeling"
8. "I Am a Child of God"
9. "A Child's Prayer"
10. "Suo-gan"
11. "Oh, What Songs of the Heart"
12. "I Often Go Walking"
13. "Simple Gifts"
14. "I'm Trying to Be Like Jesus"
15. "My Heavenly Father Loves Me"
16. "Turn Around"
17. "Where Love Is"
18. "Love at Home"
19. "May the Good Lord Bless and Keep You"

== Charts ==
| Chart (2005) | Peak position |
|---|---|
| Billboard Classical | 3 |
| Billboard Independent | 28 |
