= Adam C. Smyth =

English hymn composer (1840–1909)

Adam Craik Smyth (February 29, 1840 – January 12, 1909) was a teacher, musician, and composer of hymns in The Church of Jesus Christ of Latter-day Saints. Among his notable contributions was adapting a tune by Sylvanus Billings Pond into a setting used for the George Manwaring text "Joseph Smith's First Prayer", a poetic narrative of the First Vision.

Adam C. Smyth was born February 29, 1840, in Manchester, England, where his musical training began as a boy singing in cathedral choirs. Before emigrating to the United States he learned Pitman shorthand. He married Emily Brown, a convert to Mormonism, and came with her to Utah in 1864, but had not yet joined the church himself. They initially settled in Mendon, Utah, where he was baptized a member. His wife died shortly after the birth of their second child, after which he relocated to Salt Lake City, where he taught school and gave music lessons for several years.

After remarrying, Smyth moved again to Fountain Green, Utah. When the Manti Utah Temple opened in 1888, he was called to be its recorder and resettled there, also becoming the director of the Manti Tabernacle choir. He remained the temple recorder until his death in 1909.

In addition to "Joseph Smith's First Prayer", two hymns composed by Smyth, "Zion Stands with Hills Surrounded" and "Come, Thou Glorious Day of Promise", are included in the current LDS hymnal.
