= Moench =

Moench may refer to:

- Conrad Moench (1744–1805), German botanist
- Doug Moench (born 1948), American comic book writer
- Louis F. Moench (1847–1916), founder of Weber Stake Academy
- Mönch, a Swiss mountain
