= Robert Sands (conductor) =

American conductor (1828–1872)

Robert Sands (April 15, 1828 – December 7, 1872) was the fifth conductor of the Mormon Tabernacle Choir; however, he was the first after the building of the Salt Lake Tabernacle on Temple Square in Salt Lake City, Utah. Prior to Sands taking over as conductor, the choir was led by Charles J. Thomas and performed in the "Old Tabernacle", which was also on Temple Square.

== Biography ==
Sands was born in Ballinascreen, County Londonderry, Ireland. He moved to Scotland, where he was baptized a member of the Church of Jesus Christ of Latter-day Saints in 1849 and then served for a time as a Mormon missionary in Scotland.

Sands emigrated to Utah Territory in 1863. He became the fifth director of the Mormon Tabernacle Choir in November 1865. In October 1867, he led the choir in its first performance in the Salt Lake Tabernacle. In 1869 he was succeeded as director of the choir by George Careless.

Sands died in Salt Lake City at the age of 44.

== See also ==
- The Church of Jesus Christ of Latter-day Saints in Ireland

== Sources ==
- Cornwall, J. Spencer. A Century of Singing (Salt Lake City, Utah: Deseret Book, 1958) p. 351.
