= Tracy Y. Cannon =

American Mormon musician (1879–1961)

Tracy Young Cannon
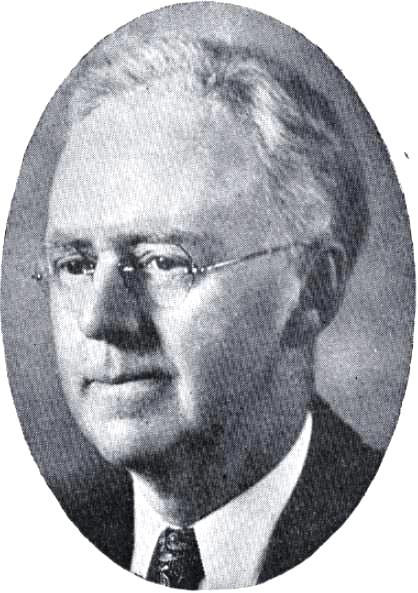

Personal details
- Born: July 23, 1879; Salt Lake City, Utah Territory, United States
- Died: November 6, 1961 (aged 82); Salt Lake City, Utah, United States
- Resting place: Salt Lake City Cemetery; 40.777°N 111.858°W
- Notable works: Editor of the 1927 LDS Church hymnal The Organist's Manual
- Spouse(s): Elsie P. J. Riter; Lettie Taylor; Carol Hinckley
- Children: 7
- Parents: George Q. Cannon; Caroline Young
- Awards: Honorary Master of Music degree from the Chicago Music College

Tracy Young Cannon (July 23, 1879 – November 6, 1961) was an American Latter-day Saint musician, composer, and musicologist.

== Early life ==
Cannon was born in Salt Lake City, Utah Territory, as Tracy Young Croxall. His mother was Caroline Young, who was the daughter of Brigham Young. His father was Mark Croxall, but when his mother divorced his father and married George Q. Cannon, Tracy took the Cannon family name.

Cannon joined the Mormon Tabernacle Choir at the age of 15. Cannon became the director of the Cannon Ward choir at age 16. He studied piano composition under John J. McClellan. He later studied in Ann Arbor, Michigan, Berlin, Paris, New York City, and Chicago. He studied piano with Alberto Jonás, organ with Alexandre Guilmant and Pietro Yon, and composition with Albert Roussel. He received an honorary Master of Music degree from the Chicago Music College in 1930.

== Leadership in The Church of Jesus Christ of Latter-day Saints ==
In 1909, Cannon became assistant organist for the Mormon Tabernacle Choir. He served in this position for 21 years. In 1930, Cannon served as the organist for the presentation of The Message of the Ages.

In 1920, Cannon was appointed to the General Music Committee of the Church of Jesus Christ of Latter-day Saints (LDS Church). In 1937, he was made assistant chair to Melvin J. Ballard, supervisor of the committee. After Ballard's death in 1939, Cannon became committee chair of the General Music Committee.

From 1915 to 1927, Cannon was a member of the high council of the Pioneer Stake of the LDS Church. In 1917, he became a member of the Deseret Sunday School Union General Board. From 1930 through 1936, Cannon was bishop of the Cannon Ward in Salt Lake City.

Cannon was an editor of the 1927 LDS Church hymnal. He also oversaw the compilation of Hymns: Church of Jesus Christ of Latter-day Saints (1948/1950), and he contributed several hymns to this hymnal.

In 1925, Cannon was appointed director of the McCune School of Music and Art. He served in this position until 1950.

Cannon wrote The Organist's Manual.

== Compositions ==
In the 1985 English edition of the LDS hymnal, the following hymns are by Cannon:

- 9 "Come, Rejoice" (Words and music)
- 20 "God of Power, God of Right" (music)
- 73 "Praise the Lord with Heart and Voice" (words and music)
- 161 "The Lord Be with Us" (music)
- 167 "Come, Let Us Sing an Evening Hymn" (music)
- 234 "Jesus, Mighty King in Zion" (music)
- 288 "How Beautiful Thy Temples, Lord" (music)

Cannon was also known for his 1913 setting of "O My Father."
