= T. Edgar Lyon =

American historian (1903–1978)

Thomas Edgar "Ed" Lyon (9 August 1903 – 20 September 1978) was a prominent Latter-day Saint historian and educator. He is most noted for his work on 19th century Latter-day Saint history. He also wrote on Latter-day Saint doctrine.

Lyon was born in Salt Lake City, Utah. At age nine he began working in his father's print shop and at age 12 he began to spend summers doing ranch work in Jackson Hole, Wyoming.

Lyon graduated from LDS High School in Salt Lake City. He studied for two years at the University of Utah and then left on a mission for The Church of Jesus Christ of Latter-day Saints to the Netherlands. He was set apart as a missionary by Melvin J. Ballard.

After his mission, Lyon resumed his studies at the University of Utah. In 1927 he married Laura Hermana Forsberg. They became the parents of six children, David Waldemar Lyon (born 9 July 1928), John Lyon (20 June 1930 – 15 October 2009), twins born in the Netherlands on 17 February 1934: A. Laurence Lyon (died 8 November 2006) and James Karl Lyon; and twins born 13 May 1939: Thomas Edgar "Ted" Lyon Jr. and Joseph Lynn Lyon.

After receiving his bachelor's degree from the University of Utah, Lyon taught high school for a year in Rigby, Idaho. He then became a seminary principal in the Church Educational System. In 1930, Lyon began work on a master's degree at the University of Chicago which he completed in 1932, writing his thesis on Orson Pratt.

Lyon then served for a short time as a professor at Ricks College. In November 1933 he took over as president of the Netherlands Mission of the LDS Church from Frank I. Kooyman.

After his term as mission president, Lyon became a member of the faculty of the Salt Lake LDS Institute of Religion which largely consisted of students at the University of Utah. Lyon received his Ph.D. in history from the University of Utah in 1962.

Lyon wrote several articles about early Latter-day Saint history, primarily the Nauvoo period. His Introduction to the Doctrine and Covenants was used as the Melchizedek priesthood manual in 1960. From 1968 to 1969, he was President of the Mormon History Association. He also worked in the 1970s as a research historian for Nauvoo Restoration, Inc. and did extensive research for a book on the history of Nauvoo. After Lyon's death in 1978, Glen M. Leonard took over the project, and had it published as Nauvoo: A Place of Peace, a People of Promise.

The Mormon History Association has named its award for excellent article on Mormon history after Lyon.
