= William Clayson =

Latter-day Saint hymnwriter

William Clayson (1840–1887) was a Latter-day Saint hymnwriter who wrote the music of "The Day Dawn is Breaking"; "Nearer, Dear Savior, to Thee"; "Hope of Israel"; "O Thou Rock of Our Salvation"; "The Iron Rod" and "Oh, What Songs of the Heart".

Clayson was born in England. He joined the Church of Jesus Christ of Latter-day Saints (LDS Church) in 1855. In 1859 he served as branch president in Irchester. In 1861 he emigrated to Utah Territory, settling in Payson, Utah. He married Susan Moulton in Utah who he had become engaged to before leaving England. He was associated with the LDS Sunday School in Payson, and all his hymn tunes were written as accompaniments to words by Joseph L. Townsend, who was also associated with the Sunday School in Payson.

== Sources ==
- J. Spencer Cornwall. Stories of Our Mormon Hymns. Salt Lake City: Deseret Book Company, 1975. p. 73.
- The Church of Jesus Christ of Latter-day Saints. Hymns of the Church of Jesus Christ of Latter-day Saints. Salt Lake City: The Church of Jesus Christ of Latter-day Saints, 1985. p. 388.
