= Reid N. Nibley =

American pianist, composer and music educator (1923–2008)

Reid Nibley
- Born: Reid Neibaur Nibley; January 5, 1923; United States
- Died: February 25, 2008 (aged 85)
- Occupations: Pianist, composer, music educator
- Children: 6
- Parent(s): Alexander Nibley (father), Agnes Sloan (mother)
- Relatives: Hugh Nibley (brother), Richard Nibley (brother)

Reid Neibaur Nibley (5 January 1923 – 25 February 2008) was an American pianist, composer and music educator. He wrote the words and music to the Latter-day Saint hymn "I Know My Father Lives".

Nibley was born to Alexander Nibley and his wife Agnes Sloan. He was the younger brother of Hugh Nibley. He had another brother, Richard Nibley, who was also a music educator. Nibley's ancestry was Scottish, English, French and Jewish. Nibley was raised mainly in the Los Angeles area, where he was friends with Ray Bradbury, also a youth at the time. They would jointly write the music and scripts of roadshow productions of area youth groups of The Church of Jesus Christ of Latter-day Saints.

Nibley became involved in music while still a child. He made his debut with the Glendale Symphony Orchestra at age eleven, and performed as a soloist with the Los Angeles Philharmonic at age 17. He was the principal pianist for the Utah Symphony Orchestra for ten years. Among Nibley's later instructors were Leroy J. Robertson and Gyorgy Sandor.

Nibley was a professor at the University of Utah, the University of Michigan, The University of Southern California and Brigham Young University (BYU). At BYU, Nibley also held the position of pianist-in-residence. Among Nibley's students at BYU was Kevin Kenner.

Nibley married Marjorie McBride in 1947 and they had six children: Stephen, Breta, Richard, Garn, Virginia, and Jonathan. Marjorie died in 2000. In 2001, Nibley married Nona Gallacher.

Nibley's hymn "I Know My Father Lives" is in both the Primary Children's Songbook and the 1985 hymnal of the Church of Jesus Christ of Latter-day Saints. In 1998, a CD of some of Nibley's works, Quiet Classics: Piano Meditations, was released. Nibley also wrote at least one sonata.
