= John E. Tullidge =

John Elliott Tullidge, Sr. (November 29, 1806 – January 17, 1873) was the first music critic in Utah Territory and was a Latter Day Saint musician and hymnwriter.

== Biography ==
Tullidge was born in Weymouth, England. His family was wealthy and he received early education from a tutor, and eventually graduated from Eton. He then became the principal tenor and one of the conductors of the York Harmonic Society. Later he moved to Wales where he became the conductor of St. Mary's Cathedral choir in Newport. He founded the Newport Harmonic Society in 1843.

Tullidge married Elizabeth Jane Dawe(s) in 1826. They had several children, including Edward W. Tullidge and John Tullidge Jr. Starting in 1850 with Edward, many of Tullidge's children joined the Church of Jesus Christ of Latter-day Saints (LDS Church). In 1856 Tullidge founded a school of music in Liverpool aimed primarily at Latter-day Saints. Although not a member himself, Tullidge traveled with his wife and his son John and John's wife and child to Utah Territory in 1863.

=== Mormonism and music in Utah ===
In 1864, Tullidge was baptized a member of the LDS Church. In October 1863, he wrote the first known piece of music criticism in Utah. His piece was considered far too critical towards musicians, and the Deseret News did not publish another one of his works of music criticism for several years. During his time in Utah, Tullidge wrote many scores for the Salt Lake theatre orchestra. Tullidge edited the first LDS hymnbook to contain both words and music.

Tullidge's daughter Jane married Alexander C. Pyper, who was the father of George D. Pyper.

Tullidge died in Salt Lake City at the age of 66 after falling down a theater staircase.

== Legacy ==
Among the hymns in the 1985 English-language edition of the LDS Church hymnal that have music by Tullidge are "An Angel From On High" and "Come, All Ye Saints of Zion". Tullidge also wrote the music to the hymn "Think Not When Ye Gather to Zion", which is not in the current LDS Church hymnal.
