= Vanja Y. Watkins =

Vanja Yorgason Watkins (born 1938) is a prolific writer of hymns of the Church of Jesus Christ of Latter-day Saints (LDS Church). She composed the music for "Press Forward Saints" and "Families Can Be Together Forever", hymns that appear in the 1985 English-language hymnal of the LDS Church. She also wrote the music to a number of songs in the Primary's Children's Songbook, including the 13 "Articles of Faith" songs.

Watkins holds a bachelor's and master's degree from Brigham Young University (BYU). She has served on the general board of the Primary, the church's General Music Committee, and has been a stake Primary president and a stake Relief Society president. She taught music in public schools in Ogden and Salt Lake City and later at BYU.

Watkins married Jack B. Watkins, with whom she had five children.

Watkins contributed 27 works to the Children's Songbook.

== Sources ==
- Mormon Artist bio
- churchofjesuschrist.org music listing for Watkins
- Mormon Literature database listing for Watkins
- Deseret News article on Watkins
- Patricia Kelsey Graham. We Shall Make Music, p. 123
