= Daniel Carter (LDS composer) =

American singer-songwriter (born 1955)

- Origin: Caldwell, Idaho
- Genres: Religious/pop/stage musical/piano
- Years active: 35
- Website: dancarterREALmusic.com

Daniel Lyman Carter (aka Dan Carter) (born 1955) is a composer/songwriter. Much of his work reflects his membership in the Church of Jesus Christ of Latter-day Saints (LDS Church). He was born in Caldwell, Idaho.

Daniel Carter experienced various troubles in his life during his pursuit as a composer. In 1998 he lost his home, most of his possessions and various family relationships in what has been described as a horrific divorce. In 2004 he went through another divorce, following which he stayed with a friend and made also attempted suicide. During this second period of time he also stepped away from the Mormon faith for a time. These two divorces are not the only challenges that Daniel has faced in life, with two periods of homelessness also having been experienced.

His compositions include "As Now We Take the Sacrament" (Hymns 1985, no. 169; with text by Lee Tom Perry), as well as "A Young Man Prepared" and "The Shepherd's Carol" (Children's Songbook pp. 166, 40, respectively). In 1996, Carter was commissioned to compose "Come unto Christ, the Holy One of Israel" for the 1997 Mormon pioneer sesquicentennial celebration. In 1993, he received a commission to compose "Refuge and Rest," a multimedia oratorio to commemorate the July 1996 sesquicentennial celebration of the establishment of Winter Quarters. Later that year "Refuge and Rest" was expanded to include the Mormon pioneers' exodus from Winter Quarters to the Salt Lake Valley. It was performed numerous times in Utah in 1997 under the title "Seasons of Faith."

== Work ==
Carter has contributed several dozen compositions to LDS Church magazines since the late 1970s. The Mormon Tabernacle Choir has performed and recorded some of his works including "Come unto Him," "The Pledge of Allegiance," and "Come unto Christ, the Holy One of Israel."

"Shine for Me Again, Star of Bethlehem," a Christmas song collaboration in 1981 with lyricist Sherri Otteson Bird, remains a best seller throughout the LDS Church.

Carter worked as a member of the LDS Church's General Music Committee from 1986 to 2004. He traveled to regional LDS Church music workshops speaking and teaching in many subject areas. He contributed an article on church music policy to the Ensign magazine.

His choral group, "Dan Carter Singers", performed for approximately 10 years throughout Utah and other regional locations, in churches and communities. The group's focus was to perform new, inspiring LDS music. The group recorded one CD in 1996 titled, "Come unto Him — Music by Dan Carter."

Carter has approximately 500 pieces of music in print and continues to compose and publish. More recently his musical works focus on music for theatrical productions.

== Discography ==
1. Come unto Him — Music by Dan Carter (1996)
2. Hymns for Solo Voice (2000)
3. Artaban, The Other Wise Man

== Publications ==
1. HeartRise Music Productions
2. Jackman Music Corporation
3. Artaban, The Other Wise Man
4. ldsmusicsource.com
5. Neil A. Kjos Music
6. Daniel Carter also writes at hubpages.com under his name, "daniel carter" on a variety of subjects including mental illness, emotional well being, music, recipes and more.
