= Charles L. Walker =

English hymnwriter

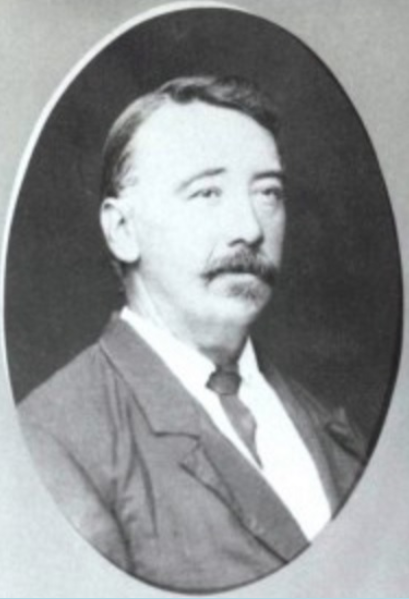
Charles L Walker Portrait

Charles Lowell Walker (1832–1904) was a Latter-day Saint hymnwriter, most noted for having written the words to the hymn "Dearest Children, God is Near You".

Walker was born in Leek, Staffordshire, England. His family moved to Manchester when he was seven. He joined the Church of Jesus Christ of Latter-day Saints (LDS Church) in 1845 when he was baptized by his father, William Gibson Walker. He left England bound for Utah Territory in 1849. He traveled as far as St. Louis that year, but many who he was with suffered from cholera. Walker moved to Kentucky and began to work to earn money to bring his parents to America. He later returned to St. Louis where he served as second counselor in the bishopric of a ward there.

In 1855, Walker obtained a job as a teamster transporting merchandise to Salt Lake City. His sister Ann Agatha was married to Parley P. Pratt and so Walker was able to get a job working for Pratt.

Walker then became a blacksmith. In 1861, he married Abigail Middlemass, also a convert to the LDS Church and a native of Popes Harbour, Nova Scotia. In August 1862, Walker was called to go to St. George, Utah, as part of the Cotton Mission. It was here that Walker's gift for writing songs was first utilized. According to J. Spencer Cornwall, many said that Utah's Dixie was settled with "faith, toil, and Charley's songs". In times of death or other distress, Erastus Snow, the presiding church authority in Southern Utah, would come to Walker and ask, "Charley, write a song to lift our sadness".

Walker also kept a daily journal of his life in St. George. A version of Walker's diary was published by Utah State University Press in 1980. This diary was edited by Karl Larson and Katherine Larson. In 1893, Walker recorded in his journal that John Alger (brother to Joseph Smith's plural wife Fanny Alger) had reported in a sacrament meeting in St. George a childhood memory of Joseph Smith reporting his First Vision. In Alger's recollection, Smith related, with Alger present, that God touched his eyes at the beginning of this visionary experience. This is the last recording of a First Vision account given by someone who had heard Smith tell of the event firsthand.

Walker—along with Orson Pratt, Jr., Joseph Orton, and George A. Burgon—published the first newspaper in St. George.

Besides marginally successful attempts at growing fruit trees and successful work as a blacksmith, Walker also worked as a stonemason on both the St. George Temple and the St. George Tabernacle. The choir at the dedication of the temple sang a song that Walker had written for the event, and Walker was also one of the two witnesses to the first baptism for the dead performed in the temple.

Walker was the Assistant City Marshall and a lieutenant in the local contingent of the Nauvoo Legion. He also served as a counselor in a bishopric in St. George.

In 1877, Walker took a plural wife, Sarah Smith. Walker had eight children with each of his wives, for a total of 16. Four of Walker's children died while still children and two of his married daughters also died before him.
