= Paul L. Anderson =

American architect (1946–2018)

Paul L. Anderson (June 6, 1946 – March 23, 2018) was an American architect, architectural historian, museum curator, and hymnwriter. He was also a member of The Church of Jesus Christ of Latter-day Saints (LDS Church).

Anderson was born in Pasadena, California, and, as a young man, served a mission for the LDS Church in Japan.

Anderson earned a B.A. with honors from Stanford University in 1968 and a Master of Architecture from Princeton University in 1972. He worked as an architect in Pasadena, California, and was licensed in 1976.

In 1977, Anderson married historian Lavina Fielding Anderson. They lived in Salt Lake City, Utah, and had one son, Christian, born in 1980. During the 1993 conflict between LDS intellectuals, including his wife Lavina, and LDS Church leadership (which resulted in Lavina's excommunication), Paul publicly called for peace and reconciliation between the parties.

In 1973, Anderson received a fellowship from the LDS Church's Historical Department to study historical Mormon architecture, which led to a position restoring the church's historic buildings. He contributed to the planning of the Museum of Church History and Art, which opened in 1984, and later designed its exhibits. He also helped launch the Brigham Young University Museum of Art in 1992, where he served as head of design and curator. Anderson was actively involved in the work of Nauvoo Restoration, Inc.

Anderson was a longtime member of the Mormon History Association (MHA), organizing its 1987 conference in England, for which he received a Special Citation from the MHA. He served as MHA president from 2007 to 2008.

In addition to his architectural work, Anderson had a strong interest in music. He sang for several years with the Utah Symphony Chorus and wrote the text for four hymns included in the 1985 LDS hymnbook: numbers 139, "In Fasting We Approach Thee"; 148, "Sabbath Day"; 291, "Turn Your Hearts"; and 311, "We Meet Again as Sisters".

Anderson died on March 23, 2018, following a heart attack.
