= Thomas C. Griggs =

English-born American hymnwriter

Thomas Cott Griggs
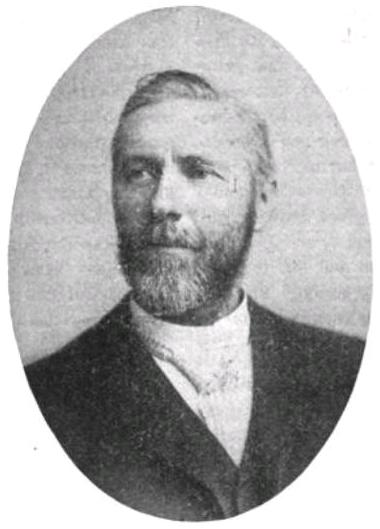
- Thomas C. Griggs

Background information
- Born: 19 June 1845; Dover, Kent, England
- Died: 12 August 1903
- Occupation(s): Latter-day Saint director and hymnwriter

Thomas Cott Griggs (19 June 1845 – 12 August 1903) was an English-born Latter-day Saint director and hymnwriter. He was the composer of the music to "Gently Raise the Sacred Strain", which has been used by the Mormon Tabernacle Choir for over three-quarters of a century as the opening number in the Music and the Spoken Word broadcasts.

== Biography ==
Griggs was born in Dover, Kent, England. His mother joined the Church of Jesus Christ of Latter-day Saints (LDS Church) when Griggs was young and he was baptized a Latter-day Saint in May 1856. That same year he and his mother (his father was dead by this point) traveled with a group of Latter-day Saints to Boston. They stayed there for five years. During this time, Griggs belonged to a band formed by the LDS Church's Boston congregation. It was as a member of this band that he first had his desire to study music kindled. While in Boston, Griggs was also made a teacher in the LDS Church's Aaronic priesthood; his call to this office was given by Apostle George Q. Cannon. With the outbreak of the American Civil War, the Griggs heeded the counsel of LDS Church leaders to move to Utah Territory. The Griggs crossed the plains in Joseph Horne's Mormon pioneer company in 1861.

Griggs first joined the Mormon Tabernacle Choir in 1866 when Charles John Thomas was the director. Griggs would continue as a member of the choir until his death in 1903. While Robert Sands was the conductor of the choir, Griggs served as the assistant conductor. Around 1880, Griggs left the choir for a short time to serve as a Mormon missionary in Britain. While away, he was appointed director of the choir, but on returning to Utah and realizing that Ebenezer Beesley was directing the choir well, he convinced to church leaders to appoint Beesley as the director and leave him as the assistant director.

Besides his work with the Mormon Tabernacle Choir, Griggs also assisted in the compilation of the Latter-day Saint Psalmody and the first song book published by the Deseret Sunday School Union.

Griggs had very deep connections to the LDS Church's Sunday School. From 1874 to 1891 he was superintendent of the Sunday School located in the 15th Ward in Salt Lake City. From 1891 to 1901 he was superintendent of the Sunday School for the Salt Lake Stake, thus being in charge of all Sunday Schools teaching Latter-day Saints in all of Salt Lake County. Griggs had also been made a member of the General Board of the Deseret Sunday School Union in 1889, and served in that position until his death in 1903. He was the Deseret Sunday School Union business manager from 1900 until his death.
