= Louis F. Moench =

Louis Frederick Moench (July 29, 1847 – April 25, 1916) was the founding president of Weber Stake Academy and the father of education in Northern Utah, on the same level of importance as John R. Park and Karl G. Maeser to the development of education in Utah.

Moench was born in Neuffen, Germany. He was educated in Germany, but before completing studies at a gymnasium came to Chicago, United States, with his family. He eventually graduated from Bryant & Stratton College there. He then headed west with the intention of becoming an educator in California. However he stopped in Salt Lake City in 1864 and through the kindness of the people there came to join the Church of Jesus Christ of Latter-day Saints. For a short time beginning in 1867, Moench was an instructor at the University of Deseret (the predecessor of the University of Utah). He then taught at a "Select School" in Salt Lake where Brigham Young's sons and daughters and only select people in Salt Lake City were in attendance. In 1870, he moved to Brigham City and established the "Select School." In 1872, he accepted a position to organize and teach at Ogden, Utah at the Ogden Seminary. In 1875, as he continued to teach, he accepted the position of Superintendent of Schools for Weber County, retiring in 1883.

In Ogden, Moench was supervisor of the city and county schools. He is considered the first president of Weber State University as he was, beginning in 1889, the first principal of Weber Stake Academy. A second term began in 1894. He was succeeded as head of the academy in 1902 by David O. McKay.

Moench also served as a missionary for the LDS Church in Switzerland and Germany. While on this mission he published many materials in German. The most notable of these was the hymn "Hark, All Ye Nations" set to music by George F. Root. This hymn became the most loved hymn of the German-speaking Latter-day Saints and was translated into English and published as part of the 1985 version of the LDS hymnbook.

Moench was also the assistant superintendent of the Sunday Schools of the Weber Stake under Richard Ballantyne.

His daughter was the fictionist Laura Moench Jenkins who also wrote of her father's life as "A Sketch in the Life of Professor Louis Frederick Moench"; his daughter Delecta Moench Davis also wrote about him in "The Story of a Pioneer."

== Sources ==
- Karen Lynn Davidson. The Stories of Our Latter-day Saint Hymns. (Salt Lake City: Deseret Book, 1988) p. 413.
- Andrew Jenson. LDS Biographical Encyclopedia. Vol. 2, p. 244.
