= Gerrit de Jong Jr. =

Gerrit de Jong Jr. (28 March 1892, Amsterdam – 26 September 1978, Provo, Utah) was an American academic and the first dean of the College of Fine Arts at Brigham Young University (BYU).

De Jong wrote the words and music for the Latter-day Saint hymn, "Come Sing to the Lord," included in the 1985 hymnal. Even though he was dean of the College of Fine Arts, de Jong spent most of his career teaching foreign languages. The de Jong Concert Hall at BYU was named in his honor.

== Personal life ==
De Jong converted to the Church of Jesus Christ of Latter-day Saints (LDS Church) from the Dutch Reformed (Protestant) tradition in his late teens.
