= A. Laurence Lyon =

Composer and professor

A. Laurence Lyon (1934–2006) was a composer of music, usually sacred music with a Latter-day Saint theme. He also served for 30 years as a professor at Western Oregon University.

Lyon was born in Rotterdam, Netherlands where his father, T. Edgar Lyon was serving as president of the Netherlands Mission of the Church of Jesus Christ of Latter-day Saints (LDS Church).

Lyon created his first composition at 12. He was first called as an organist for a congregation of the LDS Church when he was 16 years old. That same year, he wrote and premiered a sextet for brass and woodwinds at Granite High School in Salt Lake City, Utah. He served as a LDS Church missionary in the Netherlands Mission, and organized and directed the choir from that mission that sang at the dedication of the Swiss Temple. In 1958 he married Donna Reeder in the Salt Lake Temple.

After his mission, Lyon received a bachelor's degree from the University of Utah and a Ph.D. from the Eastman School of Music.

From 1967 until 1997, Lyon was a professor of music at Western Oregon University. He was also president of Modern Music Methods, a publisher of string music for children.

Lyon has been involved with the music for many LDS Church temple dedications. He wrote an arrangement of "The Morning Breaks" specifically for the dedication of the Oakland California Temple and directed choirs that performed at the dedications of the Portland Oregon Temple and the Seattle Washington Temple.

Lyon served on multiple occasions in LDS bishoprics and on stake high councils. He was a member of the General Sunday School board in 1967 and of the general church music committee from 1985-1993. From 1999 until 2000, he and his wife served as missionaries in the Chile Osorno Mission.

Two of Lyon's works are included in the 1985 edition of the LDS Church hymnbook. They are "Each Life That Touches Ours For Good" and "Saints, Behold How Great Jehovah." He also wrote seven works in the Primary Children's Songbook.

Over 200 arrangements and compositions by Lyon were published. Many of his choral and organ works were featured on the Mormon Tabernacle Choir's weekly broadcasts. Among his works was the oratorio "Visions of Light and Truth," which was commissioned by BYU-Idaho.
