= Grietje Terburg Rowley =

Latter-day Saint hymnwriter (1927–2015)

Elizabeth Grietje Terburg Rowley (1927–2015) was a Latter-day Saint hymnwriter. Born in Florida, she later moved to Hawaii, to teach, and then to Salt Lake City, Utah. She wrote several hymns for the Church of Jesus Christ of Latter-day Saints (LDS Church), among which is "Be Thou Humble".

== Life ==
Rowley was born Elizabeth Grietje Terburg in Homestead, Florida to a family of Dutch background. She studied at Oberlin College and the University of Miami. Upon graduation, Rowley moved to Hawaii to teach high school where she joined the Church of Jesus Christ of Latter-day Saints. Afterward, she moved to Salt Lake City, Utah, and spent most of her remaining life there. She married Grant Rowley in 1953.

Rowley composed many hymns and is most well known for "Be Thou Humble", included in her church's 1985 hymnal. The text, based on two verses of scripture, Doctrine and Covenants 112:10 and Ether 12:27, teaches that as one humbles oneself, their prayers are answered and they will ultimately return to the presence of their Heavenly Father.

Other hymns of hers are included in the Primary's Children's Songbook, including "I Want To Be a Missionary Now" and "Samuel Tells of the Baby Jesus. Her hymns earned several prizes in competitions. She served on the LDS General Music Committee.

== Songs composed ==
Below is a concise list of the songs composed by Rowley.

- A Smile Is Like a Sunshine
- Distant Bells
- Each Sunday Morning
- I Want To Be a Missionary Now
- Roll Your Hands
- Be Thou Humble
- All Thy Children Shall Be Taught of the Lord
- Ask, and Ye Shall Receive
- Father, We Thank Thee for the Night
- Samuel Tells of the Baby Jesus
- Two Happy Feet

== Sources ==
- Steven E. Snow, "Be Thou Humble", Liahona, May 2016.
- Mormon Literature Database entry for Rowley
- Patricia Kelsey Graham. We Shall Make Music: Stories of the Primary Songs and How They Came To Be, p. 68
