= Orson Pratt Huish =

British-born American hymnwriter and artist (1851–1932)

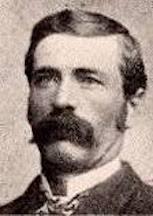
- Huish in 1865

Personal details
- Born: September 5, 1851; Blaenavon, Monmouthshire, United Kingdom
- Died: December 4, 1932 (aged 81); Payson, Utah, United States
- Resting place: Payson City Cemetery
- Occupation: Hymnwriter; Artist; Photographer
- Spouse(s): Ann Marintha Pickering

Orson Pratt Huish (September 5, 1851 – December 4, 1932) was a British-born American hymnwriter and artist, associated with the Latter Day Saint movement.

He is particularly notable for writing the words and music to "Come Unto Jesus", as well as a few other hymns found in the 1985 English edition of the hymnal of the Church of Jesus Christ of Latter-day Saints. His hymns have been widely sung by many choirs in many locations.

== Early life ==
Huish was born at Blaenavon, Monmouthshire to James W. Huish and Helen Niblet. He was named after Orson Pratt, who was then the president of the British Mission of the LDS Church. At age nine, Huish went with his mother and siblings to join his father in St. Louis, Missouri. In 1861 the family went to Utah Territory with the Job Pingree Company of Mormon pioneers. They settled in Payson, where Huish worked in farming and ranching as a youth.

== Career ==
In 1880, Huish formed the "Huish Band" with his brothers Edward A., Joseph W., Frank, James W. Jr., Frederick A. and his sister Florette. They traveled throughout Utah Territory, often performing for dances. Huish had been trained to perform in a band with another resident of Payson, John D. Stark.

Huish operated general stores at various times in Moab, Utah, Eugene, Oregon and Albuquerque, New Mexico. He also opened Huish Drug.

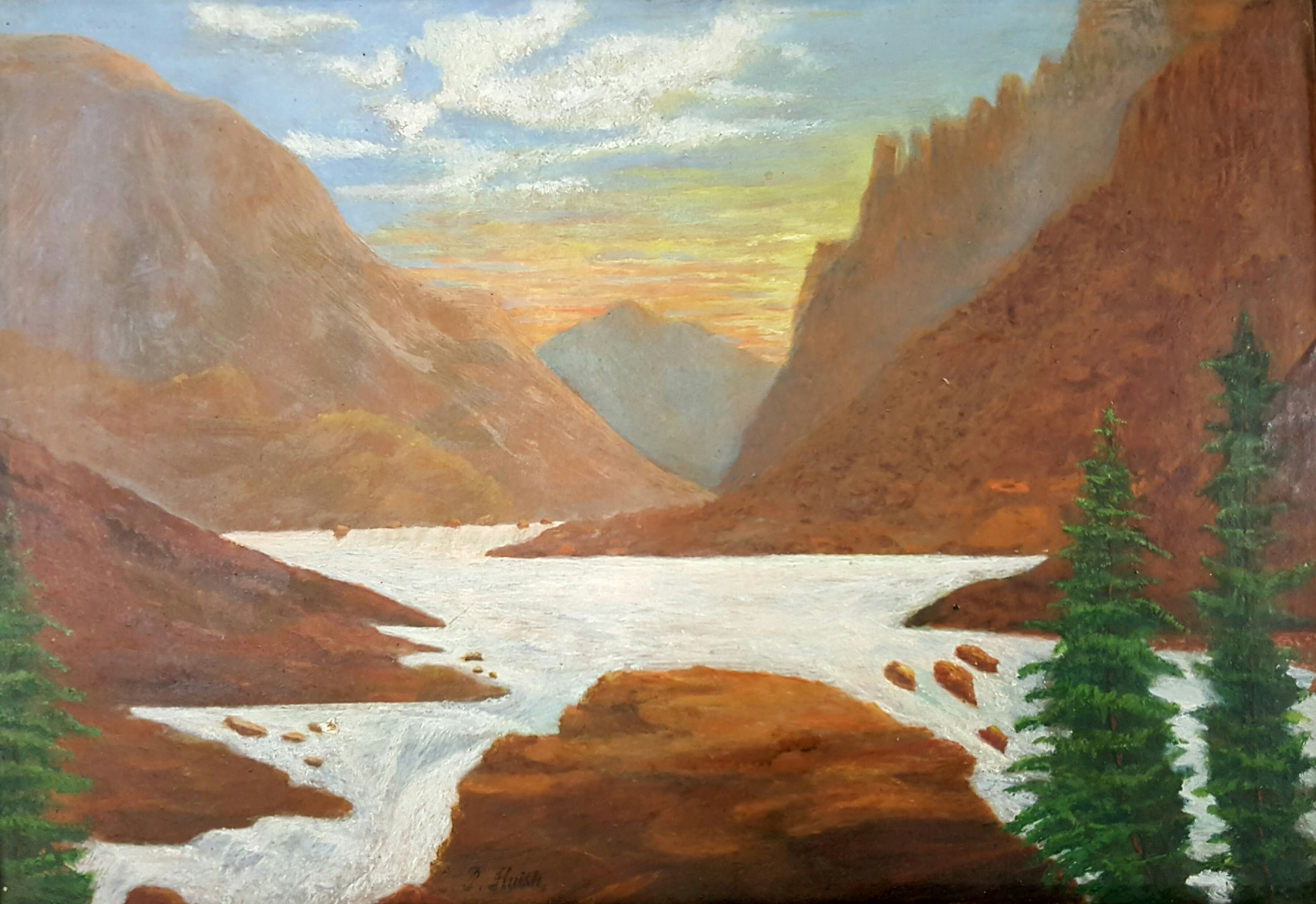
A landscape painting by Utah artist Orson Pratt Huish

Huish was not only a writer of music but he was also trained in commercial photography . Huish made some contributions in this field, operating the firm Huish and Hinshaw. They did most of their work in Utah and Arizona. Huish was also a painter and is listed in 1999's "Artists of Utah" by Olpin, Seifrit, and Swanson.

Huish wrote a total of more than 300 songs, most of which are unpublished. In the 1948 LDS Church hymnal three of his works were included. These were "Come Unto Jesus", "Jesus, My Savior True, Guide Me to Thee" and "Utah, the Star of the West". In the 1985 English hymnal only the first two of these hymns were retained. However, the hymn "Come All Ye Sons Of God" (hymn #322) has music by Huish and was in both the 1948 and 1985 hymnals.

Other noted works by Huish are the Payson High School song, "The Silver and Green" and the funeral hymn, "Blessed Are the Dead".

Huish's music remains widely available, both on its own and in medlies.

== Later life ==
Huish died on December 4, 1932, in Payson, Utah.

== Personal life ==
In 1872, Huish married Ann Marintha Pickering.
