= Marvin K. Gardner =

Marvin Kent Gardner (born 1952) is a Latter-day Saint hymnwriter and editor.

Gardner served as a Mormon missionary for the Church of Jesus Christ of Latter-day Saints in Colombia. He then studied at Brigham Young University (BYU). After that he served as an editor of the Ensign. Gardner also was an editor of the New Era and the Friend and Liahona. He served as assistant or managing editor at one or more of these publications from 1978 to 2005.

Among the hymns written by Gardner is "Press Forward, Saints." He was a member of the Hymnbook Executive Committee which compiled the 1985 LDS English Language Hymnbook.

Gardner is currently a member of the BYU faculty where he is an associate teaching professor of English language and linguistics. Gardner has also taught religion classes at BYU.

== Sources ==
- Marvin K. Gardner at the MLCA Database
- Karen Lynn Davidson. Stories of Our Latter-day Saint Hymns. (Salt Lake City: Deseret Book, 1988) p. 378.
- BYU faculty bio
- Vita
