= Joseph S. Murdock =

American hymnwriter

Joseph Stacy Murdock
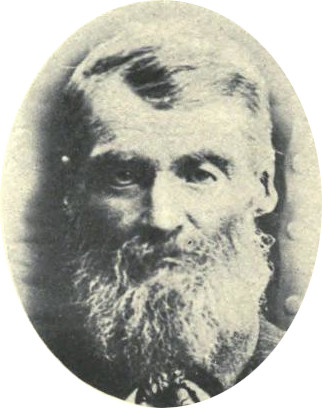
- Born: June 26, 1822; Hamilton, New York
- Died: February 15, 1899 (aged 76); Heber City, Utah
- Occupation: Farmer
- Known for: Mormon pioneer, Bishop, Colonizer
- Spouses: Eunice Sweet, Eliza Clark, Adeline Warner, Jane Sharp, Elizabeth Hunter, Pernetta
- Parent(s): Joseph Murdock, Sally Stacy
- Website: http://www.jsmurdock.org

Joseph Stacy Murdock (June 26, 1822 – February 14, 1899) was an American colonizer, leader, and Latter-day Saint hymn writer. He wrote the words to "Come Listen to a Prophet's Voice."

== Early years ==
Murdock was born in upstate New York in 1822. He married Eunice Sweet. He and his family were taught by a Latter-Day Saint missionary and were baptized into the Church of Jesus Christ of Latter-day Saints. They had a desire to live with others of their faith and moved to Nauvoo, Illinois, in 1841.

Murdock and his wife migrated with the Mormon population to the Salt Lake Valley in Daniel Spencer's 1847 Mormon pioneer company.

Murdock was asked by Brigham Young to enter the practice of plural marriage and was sent to jail for doing so in 1889. Murdock was pardoned in 1894 by U.S. President Grover Cleveland. He had 32 children from six wives: Eunice Sweet, Eliza Clark, Adeline Warner, Jane Sharp, Elizabeth Hunter, and Pernetta.

== Colonizer ==
After arriving in Utah, Brigham Young assigned Murdock the task of helping establish settlements in several areas of present-day Utah, Arizona, and Nevada. Murdock participated in the creation of American Fork, Utah; Heber City, Utah; Carson City, Nevada; and Muddy River (an abandoned settlement along the then southern Utah Territory and northern Arizona Territory, now in Nevada and called the Moapa Valley).

=== Poet ===
Murdock wrote the poem "Come Listen To A Prophet's Voice", which was put to music by Joseph J. Daynes. The hymn was based on Murdock's friendship with Joseph Smith, for whom he had acted as a bodyguard.

=== Heber City ===
In 1860, Murdock was set apart as a bishop by Brigham Young and sent to preside over the Latter-day Saints in Heber City, Utah, and vicinity. In 1865, he was also elected to represent Wasatch County in the Utah territorial legislature.

On August 20, 1867, Murdock negotiated a peace treaty with Chief Tabby-To-Kwanah, the local Ute Indian chief, to end hostilities between the Ute Indians and the local settlers. This was one of the turning points which led to the end of the Utah Black Hawk War.

Murdock's home in Heber City is registered with the National Register of Historic Places

== Later life ==
After working to establish cities throughout the west, Murdock settled in Heber City and worked as a farmer. He continued to serve in leadership positions in his church throughout his life. He died of pneumonia at the age of 76.
