= Riske =

Riske is a surname. Notable people with the surname include:

- Alison Riske (born 1990), American tennis player
- David Riske (born 1976), American baseball player
- Jan Riske (born 1932), Dutch painter
- Jeroom Riske (1919–2000), Belgian gymnast

== See also ==
- Riske Creek
