= John Edgar Gould =

American songwriter

John Edgar Gould (1821-1875) was a composer and publisher of hymns. He was born in Bangor, Maine and died in Algiers, Algeria while traveling.

Gould managed music stores in New York and Philadelphia (where he lived), and collaborated with composer William Fischer. Gould's published collections of hymns include:

- The Modern Harp, 1846
- The Wreath of School Songs, 1847
- The Tyrolian Lyre, 1847
- The Sunday School Lute, 1848
- Harmonia Sacra, 1851
- Songs of Gladness for the Sabbath School (Philadelphia, Pennsylvania: Garrigues Brothers, 1869)

He was best known for composing the tune to the popular "Jesus, Savior, Pilot Me", whose text was written by Edward Hopper.
