= Joseph L. Townsend =

American hymnwriter

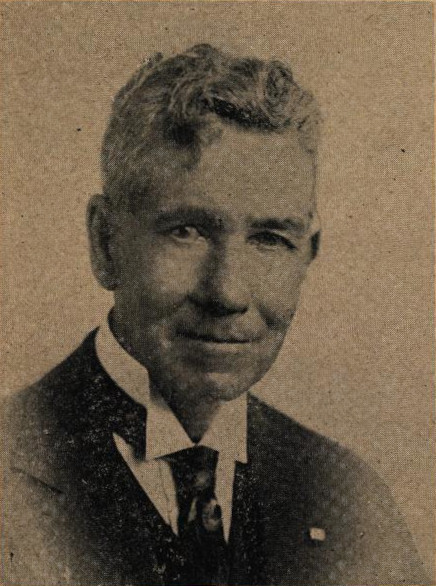

Personal details
- Born: 9 August 1849; Canton, Bradford County, Pennsylvania, United States
- Died: 1 April 1942 (aged 92); Provo, Utah, United States

Joseph Longking Townsend (August 9, 1849 – April 1, 1942) was a writer of many Latter-day Saint hymns including "Choose the Right" and "Oh, What Songs of the Heart".

== Biography ==
Townsend was born in Canton, Bradford County, Pennsylvania. He grew up in Ohio, Kansas and Missouri. Townsend studied at the University of Missouri. He came to Salt Lake City in 1872 to try to improve his health. While there, he joined the Church of Jesus Christ of Latter-day Saints (LDS Church). Townsend later served as a missionary for the church in the Southern States Mission from 1881 to 1882.

Townsend ran a drugstore in Payson, Utah, for 15 years. He then taught for two years at Brigham Young Academy, the predecessor of Brigham Young University. After that, he taught at Salt Lake City High School. He died at Utah County Infirmary in Provo. His poetry included many published works that were not made hymns.

== Hymns ==
A number of Townsend's hymns are included in the 1985 Latter-day Saint hymnal:

- #52 "The Day Dawn is Breaking"
- #99 "Nearer, Dear Savior, to Thee"
- #185 "Reverently and Meekly Now"
- #232 "Let Us Oft Speak Kind Words To Each Other"
- #239 "Choose the Right"
- #258 "O Thou Rock Of Our Salvation"
- #259 "Hope of Israel"
- #271 "Oh, Holy Words of Truth and Love"
- #274 "The Iron Rod"
- #286 "Oh, What Songs of the Heart"
