= Mabel Jones Gabbott =

American hymnwriter

Personal details
- Born: 23 October 1910; Malad City, Idaho, United States
- Died: 13 February 2004 (aged 93); Bountiful, Utah, United States

Mabel Jones Gabbott (October 23, 1910 – February 13, 2004) was an American Latter-day Saint hymnwriter, and the author of the words to "Lord, Accept into Thy Kingdom," "In Humility Our Saviour" and "We Have Partaken of Thy Love," all now part of the 1985 LDS English hymnbook.

Gabbott also wrote many hymns published by the Church of Jesus Christ of Latter-day Saints (LDS Church) in its Primary Children's Songbook, 16 of which are included in the current English edition. These include "Jesus Came to John the Baptist", "Did Jesus Really Live Again", "Samuel Tells of the Baby Jesus", and "He Sent His Son". She also wrote several works of poetry.

== Biography ==
Gabbott was born in Malad, Idaho, to Mary Lusk Jones and Bernard Jones. She was raised in Malad, a city settled primarily by Welsh Latter-day Saints, where the Welsh tradition of the eisteddfod was carried on. As a teenager she would often go to visit various wards in the stake to read works of poetry.

Gabbott went to college and then returned to Malad to work as a teacher. When she was in her late twenties Gabbott served as a Mormon missionary in the Northwestern States Mission (primarily Washington and Oregon) where she met her future husband J. Donald "Don" Gabbott. Both he and her mission president, Preston Nibley, encouraged her to begin writing.

Gabbott worked as a secretary to LeGrand Richards after her return from her mission in 1938. While in this position she had her first poem published, by the Relief Society magazine, at the urging of its editor Belle Spafford. In 1941 she married Don Gabbott and left the workforce to focus on motherhood. The Gabbotts eventually became the parents of five children. Throughout the 1940s Gabbott continued to write, occasionally doing editing work for The Children's Friend and having some of her hymns included in the 1950 LDS hymnal.

In 1964 Gabbott took a job as manuscript editor for the Relief Society Magazine. In 1965 she joined the staff of The Improvement Era. This work prompted her literary work as well. In 1967 she wrote the poem Eve and I in reaction to what she felt was not enough emphasis on Eve in existing writings of the creation. It was also during the late 1960s that Gabbott began to write children's hymns, with 3 of her works included in the 1969 Primary hymnbook, Sing With Me.

Gabbott was on the General Church Music Committee from 1973 to 1985 serving as chair of the Text Committee for the new hymnbook. She retired from working for the LDS Church magazines in 1975. Her husband died of leukemia in 1976 and much of her work was produced after this date.

It was in the 1980s that much of Gabbott's music aimed at children was published. A children's cantata of the Book of Mormon in 1981, her song He Sent His Son, in 1982 and Samuel Tells of Baby Jesus in 1985.

== Death ==
Gabbott died on February 13, 2004, in Bountiful, Utah, and is interred at Salt Lake City Cemetery.
