= Henry A. Tuckett =

American songwriter

- Born: 1852; St. Louis, Missouri, U.S.
- Died: 1918 (aged 65–66)

Henry A. Tuckett (1852–1918) was an American hymn writer and poet in the Church of Jesus Christ of Latter-day Saints (LDS Church).

Tuckett was born in St. Louis, Missouri, United States. His parents Henry Tuckett and his wife Mary Mercy Westwood were converts to the LDS Church who had recently immigrated from Great Britain and would soon move on to Utah.

Tuckett worked as a candymaker and was involved in music on the side. He wrote the music to "Choose the Right" and the music to "We Are Sowing". Tuckett also conducted a choir in the 12th Ward in downtown Salt Lake City, in which ward he also served as superintendent of the Sunday School. As of 1888 Tuckett was a vocal music instructor on the faculty of the University of Deseret (later the University of Utah). In 1890, Tuckett was an unsuccessful candidate for Salt Lake City council.

Tuckett was married to Agnes Sproul.

From 1894 to 1896 Tuckett served a mission to Great Britain.
