= I Know That My Redeemer Lives =

English Christian Easter hymn by Samuel Medley

- by Samuel Medley
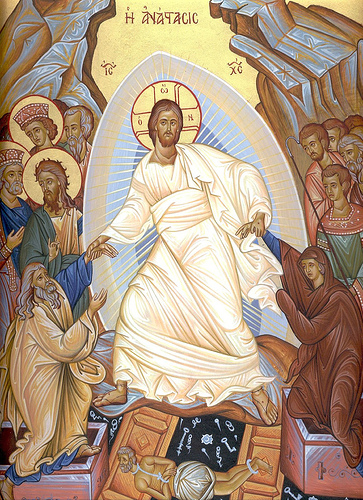
- Genre: Hymn
- Written: 1775

"I Know That My Redeemer Lives" is an English Christian Easter hymn in long metre by Samuel Medley. It was published in 1775 and is written for Easter Sunday.

== History ==
Medley had been a sailor in the Royal Navy who had been injured with his leg almost needing amputation. He wrote "I Know That My Redeemer Lives" in 1775 while he was a minister at a Baptist church in Liverpool. It was first published in George Whitefield's Psalms and Hymns hymnal in the same year with seven verses though without attribution. He later self-published it in 1800 in the London edition of his Hymns hymnal. It was usually set to the "Duke Street" hymn tune.

By the beginning of the 20th century, the hymn was in common use in both Great Britain and America, easily known by the oft-repeated "He lives!". The Church of Jesus Christ of Latter-day Saints also started to use the hymn after it was published in Emma Smith's Collection of Sacred Hymns. The Latter-day Saints version involved the merging of several verses.

== Tune ==
The hymn is most commonly set to the tune "Duke Street", composed by John Hatton, about whom little is known except his place of residence, on Duke Street in St. Helen's. The following setting appears in the modern hymnal "Complete Anglican Hymns Old and New".

== Scripture ==
Though the hymn is originally based on the Old Testament verse from the Book of Job, where Job proclaims "I Know That My Redeemer Lives" (Job 19:25), it is mostly used as a hymn for Easter Sunday commemorating the Resurrection of Jesus. Medley was also inspired by Thomas the Apostle coming to believe after having seen Jesus after the Resurrection.
