= John M. Chamberlain =

English composer (1844–1930)

John Marvin Chamberlain (May 27, 1844 – May 5, 1930) was an English-born composer of Latter-day Saint hymns, a pianist and music store owner. His most widely sung hymn is "We Are Marching On to Glory".

Chamberlain was born in Leicester, England. His parents were Latter-day Saints and in 1852 they left England to immigrate to Utah Territory. They sailed to New Orleans, then went up-river to Florence, Nebraska, and then crossed the plains to Salt Lake City.

Chamberlain was a carpenter early in life but later became a musician. He was a partner in various music firms before founding Chamberlain Music Company. Chamberlain married Louise M. E. Rawlings in the Manti Temple. They were both members of the Mormon Tabernacle Choir for many years. He had also served as an organist in the "Old" Tabernacle before the current one was built in the 1860s.

Chamberlain also served in the leadership of the Sunday School and as choir director in the 8th Ward in Salt Lake City.

In addition to "We Are Marching On to Glory" (originally titled "Marching Homeward"), Chamberlain wrote such hymns as "When Jesus Shall Come in His Glory" and "A Sunday School Call".
