= Oh, What Songs of the Heart =

"Oh, What Songs of the Heart" is a Mormon hymn, the text of which was written by Joseph L. Townsend, a Latter-day Saint poet who lived in the late 19th and early 20th century. The music was written by Latter-day Saint musician William Clayson. It is one of the few hymns of the Church of Jesus Christ of Latter-day Saints that implies the existence of a Heavenly Mother.

== Lyrics ==
Oh, what songs of the heart
We shall sing all the day,
When again we assemble at home,
When we meet ne'er to part
With the blest o'er the way,
There no more from our loved ones to roam!
When we meet ne'er to part,
Oh, what songs of the heart
We shall sing in our beautiful home.

Tho our rapture and bliss
There's no song can express,
We will shout, we will sing o'er and o'er,
As we greet with a kiss,
And with joy we caress
All our loved ones that passed on before;
As we greet with a kiss,
In our rapture and bliss,
All our love ones that passed on before.

Oh, the visions we'll see
In that home of the blest,
There's no word, there's no thought can impart,
But our rapture will be
All the soul can attest,
In the heavenly songs of the heart;
But our rapture will be
In the vision we'll see
Best expressed in the songs of the heart

Oh, what songs we'll employ!
Oh, what welcome we'll hear!
When we kneel at our dear Savior's feet.
And the heart swells with joy
In embraces most dear
When our heavenly parents we meet!
Oh, what songs we'll employ
As the heart swells with joy,
When our heavenly parents we meet!

== Current usage ==
"Oh, What Songs of the Heart" is hymn #286 in the LDS Church's current hymnal.

== See also ==
- O My Father
