= John J. McClellan =

American organist (1874–1925)

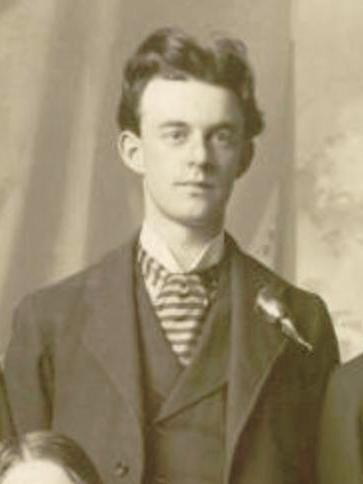
McClellan while teaching music at LDS College

John Jasper McClellan Jr. (April 20, 1874 – August 2, 1925) served as the chief organist of the organ in the Salt Lake Tabernacle of the Church of Jesus Christ of Latter-day Saints from 1900 to 1925.

== Biography ==
McClellan was born in Payson, Utah Territory. By the age of eleven McClellan was serving as a church organist in Payson. McClellan's father, also John J. McClellan, served as mayor of Payson from 1887 to 1890.

In 1891, McClellan went to Saginaw, Michigan, where he studied under Albert W. Platte. He then went to the Ann Arbor Conservatory, where he studied under Johann Erich Schmaal. He also studied with Alberto Jonas while there. He served as organist of St. Thomas Catholic Church while in Ann Arbor. He also served as pianist of the Ann Arbor Choral Union.

In 1896, McClellan returned to Utah, where he taught music at LDS College and at Brigham Young Academy (the forerunner of Brigham Young University). It was during this time that McClellan married Mary Douglass. They eventually became the parents of five children. He also served as the pianist for the Salt Lake Opera Company.

In 1899, McClellan went to Berlin, Germany, where he studied with Xaver Scharwenka and Ernest Jedliczka. While in Berlin, McClellan edited and published a new edition of the LDS hymnal in German.

McClellan became the organist of the Salt Lake Tabernacle in 1900. In this capacity, he accompanied the Mormon Tabernacle Choir and inaugurated the free weekly organ recitals at the tabernacle. In the 1985 English edition of the LDS hymnal, the music for "Sweet Is the Work" (hymn #147) was composed by McClellan. He was a member of the Church Music Committee of the LDS Church when it was first formed.

Among those who studied under McClellan were Harold Orlob, Alexander Schreiner, Sidney B. Sperry and J. Spencer Cornwall.

John Jasper McClellan made the oldest solo pipe organ recordings that we know of today on the Salt Lake Tabernacle organ in Salt Lake City. They were recorded on or about 1 September 1910 when the Columbia Graphophone Company had transported specially designed equipment from their Bridgeport, Connecticut factory to record the famous Tabernacle choir. Two enormous acoustic recording horns, five feet long and two feet wide, were suspended on a rope strung across the Tabernacle. According to “The first recordings of organ music ever made” by John W. Landon, the Columbia engineer deemed the recordings successful, but they were never approved for release; however, all five 10-inch sides recorded were indeed released, though primarily in the United Kingdom. Columbia's British branch issued "Melody in F" (Anton Rubinstein, opus 3 no. 1) and "Toccata and Finale" (an abridged version of the Toccata and Fugue in D minor, BWV 565 by Johann Sebastian Bach) on Columbia-Rena disc 1704, "Sextette" (from Lucia di Lammermoor by Gaetano Donizetti) and "Tannhäuser: Overture" (Richard Wagner) on both sides of Columbia-Rena 2232, and "Gondoliers" (Ethelbert Woodbridge Nevin, no. 1 from A Day in Venice, opus 25) on both Columbia-Rena discs 1926 and 2399. Only the Toccata and "Gondoliers" were released in the U.S., on Columbia 10-inch disc A945 in 1911.
