= Willy Reske =

American songwriter

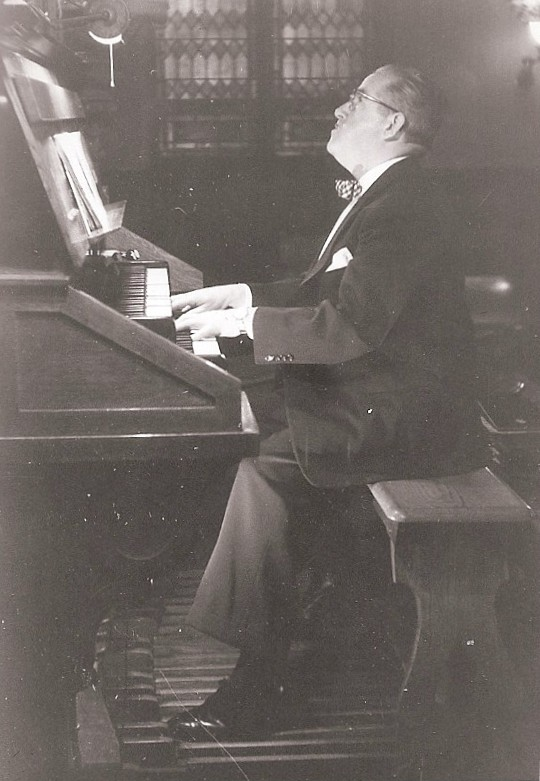
- Willy Reske

Background information
- Born: Willy Julius Reske; 25 September 1897; Königsberg, East Prussia, Germany
- Died: 17 September 1991 (aged 93) Fultonville, New York
- Genres: Church music, choral music
- Occupations: Musician, singer, organist, conductor
- Instrument: Organ

Willy Julius Reske (September 25, 1897 – September 17, 1991) was a noted organist and composer. He wrote the music to several LDS hymns, two of which are in the current edition of the hymn book of the Church of Jesus Christ of Latter-day Saints (LDS Church).

== Biography ==
Reske was born in Königsberg, East Prussia. His parents were Julius Reske and Louise Schmidtke. Reske joined the LDS Church in 1922 in Germany. He married Martha Louise Wiemer in 1923. In 1926 Reske emigrated to Brooklyn, New York. Reske died in Fultonville, New York.

== Career ==
Reske played the organ at German Evangelical Lutheran Church of St. Paul's for 33 years. He composed hundreds of hymns and organ pieces.

== Works ==
Reske wrote the music to the following hymns in the 1985 English edition of the Latter-day Saint hymnal:

- "Thy Servants Are Prepared" (nos. 261, 329)
- "God's Daily Care" (no. 306)
