= O My Father =

"O My Father" originally "My Father in Heaven"
- Hymn
- Written: October 1845
- Text: by Eliza R. Snow
- Melody: set to "My Redeemer" by James McGranahan
- Published: 15 November 1845: Nauvoo, Illinois
- Publisher: Times and Seasons

"O My Father" (originally "My Father in Heaven", also "Invocation, or The Eternal Father and Mother") is a Latter-day Saint hymn written by Eliza R. Snow, who felt inspired to write the lyrics after Joseph Smith had taught her the principle of heavenly parents.

== Heavenly Mother ==
Although references to a Heavenly Mother by church leadership have occurred every few years since Smith first taught the doctrine, the hymn is significant in terms of Mormon theology in that it is perhaps the most prominent and well-known reference to a "Heavenly Mother" in materials published by the Church of Jesus Christ of Latter-day Saints.

After discussing pre-mortal existence and a sense of belonging to "a more exalted sphere" in heaven, stanza three reasons that if there is an eternal Father there must also be an eternal Mother:

I had learn’d to call thee father
Through thy spirit from on high;
But until the key of knowledge
Was restor’d, I knew not why.
In the heav’ns are parents single?
No, the thought makes reason stare;
Truth is reason—truth eternal
Tells me I’ve a mother there.

— Eliza R. Snow

== History ==
Snow wrote "O My Father" as a poem under the title "My Father in Heaven" in October 1845 in the home of Stephen Markham in Nauvoo, Illinois. The Times and Seasons first published the words on 15 November 1845, more than a year after Smith was killed.

The poetry was later set to the music of another Christian hymn, "My Redeemer" by James McGranahan, and included in Latter-day Saint hymnals, including the current one. When a collection of Snow's poems were published in 1856, this work was placed first in the double-volume set and entitled "Invocation, or The Eternal Father and Mother".

== See also ==
- Oh, What Songs of the Heart
