= Thomas Koschat =

Austrian composer and choirmaster (1845–1914)

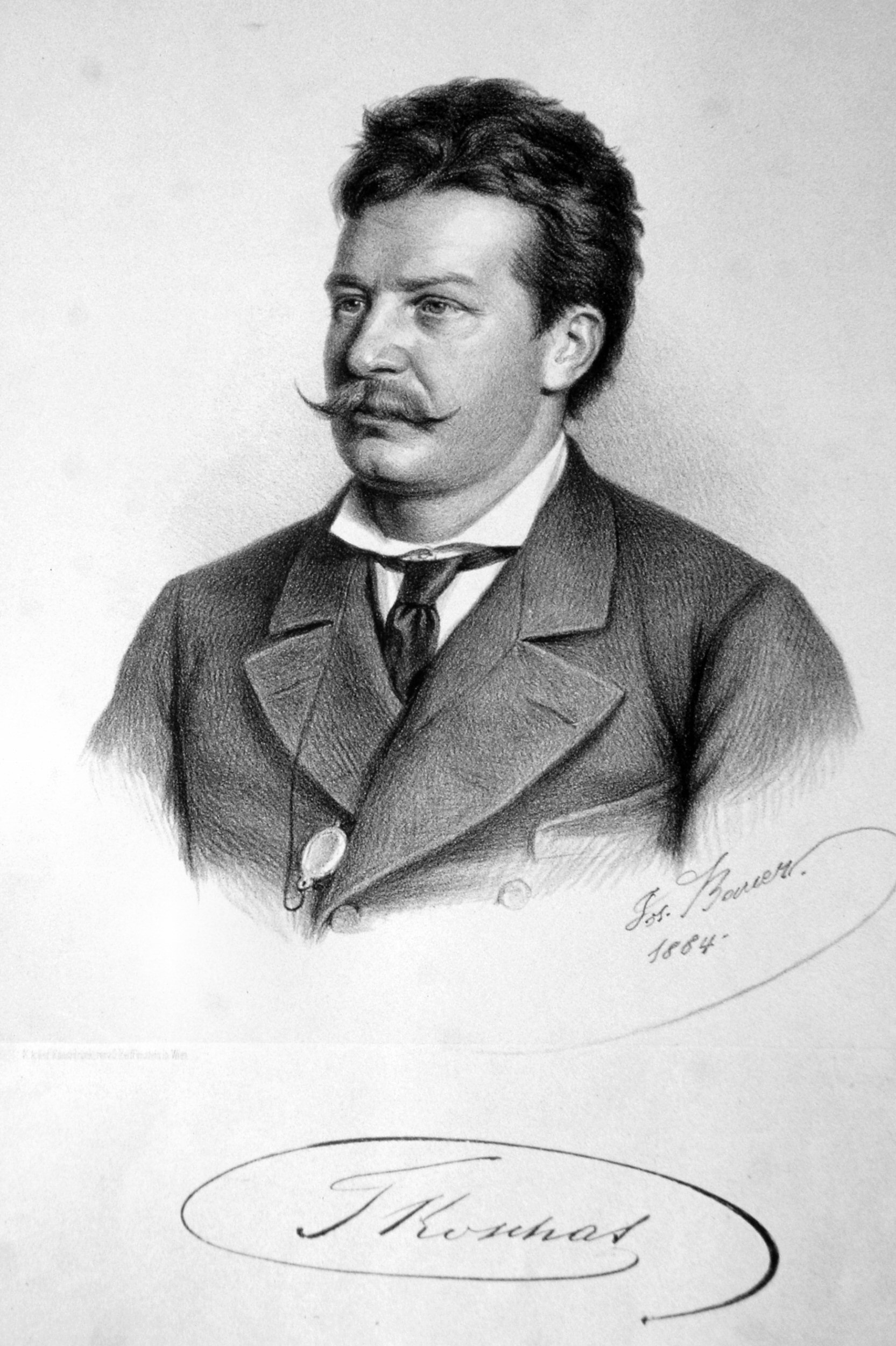
- Thomas Koschat Litho.
- Born: 8 August 1845; Klagenfurt, Austrian Empire
- Died: 19 May 1914 (aged 68); Vienna, Austria-Hungary
- Occupations: singer, composer

Thomas Koschat (8 August 1845 – 19 May 1914) was an Austrian composer and bass singer. He popularized Carinthian folk music across Europe and the Americas.

== Biography ==
Koschat was born on 8 August 1845 in the Viktring district of Klagenfurt. From 1865 to 1867 he attended the Technical University of Vienna, studying chemistry, but he did not obtain a degree. Instead his imagination was captivated by music, and he formed his first vocal quartet in 1866. He joined the Vienna State Opera in 1867, singing bass. In 1874 he joined the choir at St. Stephen's Cathedral. From 1877 until 1906 he performed with the Koschart Quintet. That year he also joined the choir at the Hofmusikkapelle and served as soloist there. As a composer he was known for his Kärntnerlieder, folk songs of Carinthia arranged by himself, or else his own compositions set in that style. With his men's quartet and quintet he toured Europe and the Americas, where the performances of his Carinthian music were enthusiastically received. For most of his life he resided in Vienna. Nonetheless, he was made an honorary citizen of Klagenfurt in 1907 owing to the local nature of his work. Koschat died in Vienna, at his home on Strobachgasse in the 5th district, on 19 May 1914. He was buried at Annabichl near Klagenfurt.

== Legacy ==
Koschat composed numerous pieces for choir, in addition to quartets and songs. Many of these are in waltz time and focus on Carinthian themes and locales. Additionally he published a book of poems in the Carinthian dialect.

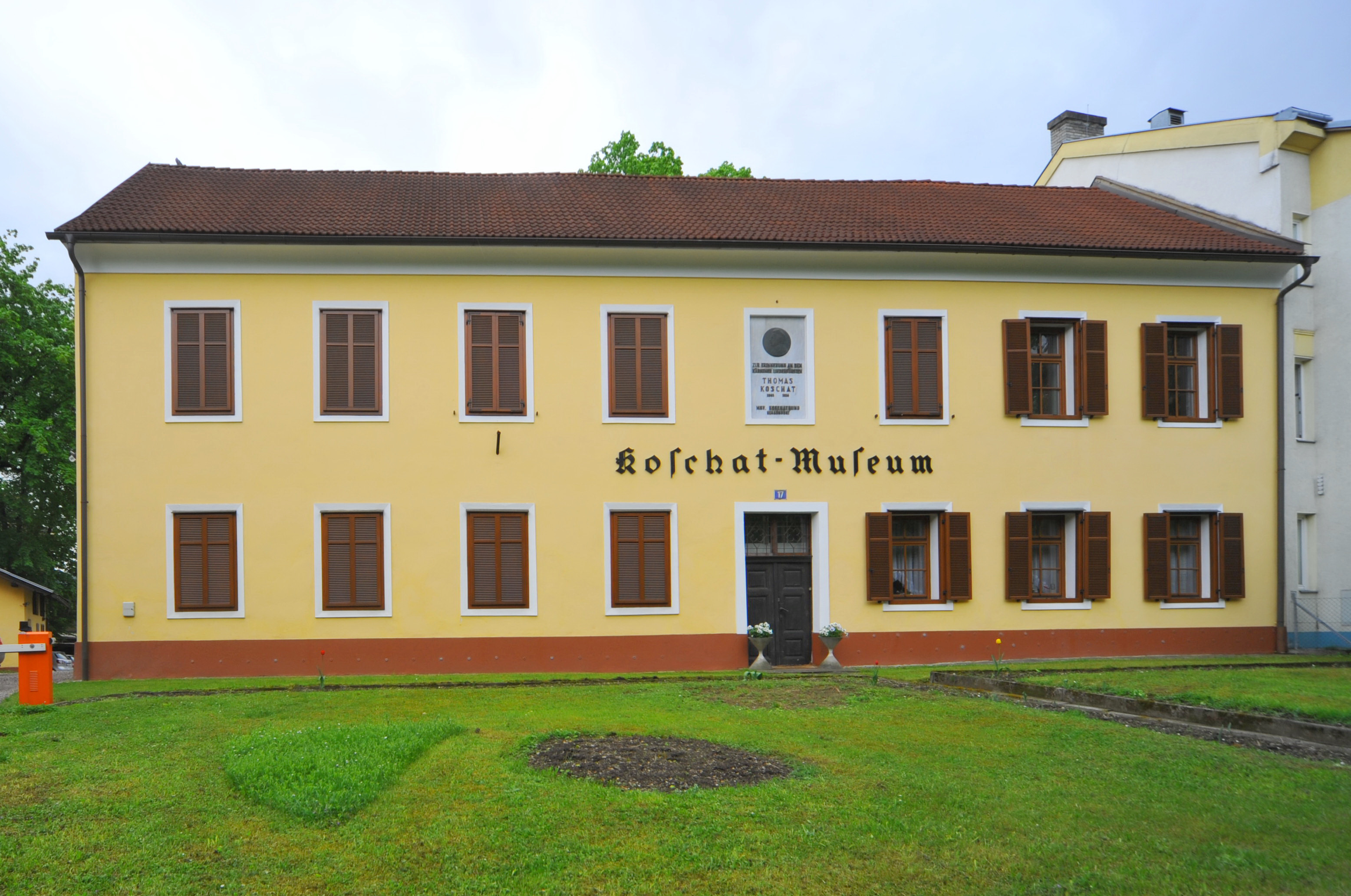
The Koschat Museum in Klagenfurt

A museum dedicated to Koschat was opened in 1934, containing letters, manuscripts, portraits, awards, recordings, and other memorabilia related to his life and output. Heavily damaged during the Second World War, the museum was rebuilt and reopened in 1951 from funds raised through private donations and lotteries. The museum is open May through September for a couple of hours each day.

In 1970 the Austrian Post issued a commemorative postage stamp honoring the 125th anniversary of Koschat's birth.
