= Mary Ann Baker =

American author of hymns and temperance songs

Mary Anna Baker
- Born: Mary Eddy Baker; September 16, 1832; Orwell, New York, U.S.
- Died: September 29, 1925 (aged 93); Maywood, Illinois, U.S.
- Resting place: Forest Home Cemetery, Forest Park, Illinois, U.S.
- Occupations: composer; singer
- Writing career
- Pen name: Mary Anna Baker

Mary Anna Baker (16 September 1832–29 September 1925) was an American composer and singer. She was an active member of a Baptist congregation. She is known for her temperance songs and hymns. Her most widely known song is Master, the Tempest is Raging better known under the title Peace, Be Still.

== Master, the Tempest is Raging ==
"Master the Tempest is Raging" was composed by Baker and H. R. Palmer. In 1874 Baker was commissioned by Dr. Palmer to compose a song related to the biblical verses about "Jesus Stilling the Tempest".

Having recently lost her brother to tuberculosis, Mary used her experience of frustration and reconciliation as inspiration to compose the words of the hymn.

As related to Ira D. Sankey:

"Dr. Palmer requested me to prepare several songs on the subject of the current Sunday school lessons. One of the themes was Christ Stilling the Tempest. It so expressed an experience I had recently passed through, that this hymn was the result.

A very dear and only brother, a young man of rare loveliness and promise of character, had been laid in the grave, a victim of the same disease that had already taken father and mother. His death occurred under peculiarly distressing circumstances.

He was more than a thousand miles away from home, seeking in the balmy air of the sunny South the healing that our colder climate could not give. Suddenly he grew worse. The writer was ill and could not go to him.

For two weeks the long lines of telegraph wires carried back and forth messages between the dying brother and his waiting sisters, ere the word came which told us that our beloved brother was no longer a dweller on the earth.

Although we mourned not as those without hope, and although I had believed on Christ in early childhood and had always desired to give the Master a consecrated and obedient life, I became wickedly rebellious at this dispensation of divine providence. I said in my heart that God did not care for me or mine. But the Master’s own voice stilled the tempest in my unsanctified heart, and brought it to the calm of a deeper faith and a more perfect trust."

Baker and Palmer's hymn enjoyed some moderate appeal amongst religious schools and churches. Almost two decades later Baker reflected on a new political connection for her composition:

"During the weeks when we kept watch by the bedside of our greatly beloved President Garfield, it was republished as especially appropriate to the time, and was sung at some of the many funeral services held throughout the United States."

During the 20th century, the hymn gained lasting popularity, appearing in more than 254 hymnals to date. Today it is most famous in its Gospel version as performed by James Cleveland and other black singers and choirs under the title Peace, Be Still.

== Works ==
Among the main hymns she composed are:

- "Master, the Tempest is Raging", also known under the title "Peace, Be Still"
- "Satan the Seed is Sowing"
- "Chained by Sin in Cruel Bondage"
- "Why Perish with Cold and with Hunger?"
- "No More the Empty Name”
- "Names Written in Heaven"
- "Lead Us, O Shepherd True"
