= William P. Merrill =

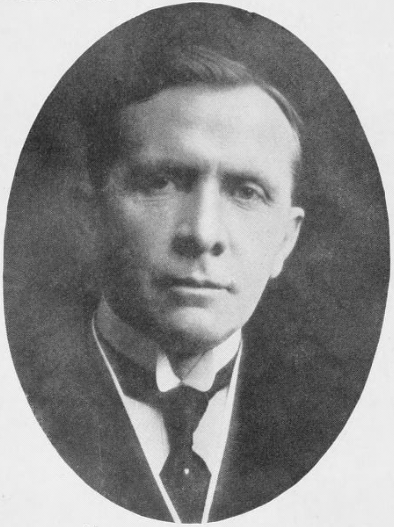
- Born: William Pierson Merrill; January 10, 1867; Orange, New Jersey, US
- Died: June 19, 1954 (aged 87); New York, New York, US
- Burial place: Woodlawn Cemetery
- Education: Rutgers University; Union Theological Seminary in the City of New York
- Occupations: Clergyman, writer

William Pierson Merrill (1867–1954) was an American Presbyterian clergyman, pacifist, author, and hymn writer. He was acknowledged during his time as one of the most influential ministers in America. He is probably best remembered as the author of several well-known hymns, including "Rise Up, O Men of God".

== Early life and education ==
William Merrill was born on January 10, 1867, in Orange, New Jersey, to George and Emily Merrill, both of English descent. During his youth, the family moved to Newburyport, Massachusetts, and then back to New Brunswick, New Jersey. Merrill earned his B.A. (1887), A.M. (1890), and D.D. (1904) from Rutgers University. He also earned a B.D.(1890) from the Union Theological Seminary in the City of New York.

== Career ==
Upon his ordination in 1890, Merrill became pastor of Trinity Presbyterian Church in Chestnut Hill, Pennsylvania, where he served until 1895. From 1895 until 1911, he served as pastor of the Sixth Presbyterian Church of Chicago. There he met his wife Clara (née Helmer). In 1911, Merrill was called to the Brick Presbyterian Church in New York City, where he served as pastor until 1938, when the merger with the Park Avenue Church took place and he resigned to become pastor emeritus.

Merrill was named the first president of the Church Peace Union, an organization of religious, academic, and political leaders aimed at promoting pacifism. His 1914 sermon titled "The Making of Peace" was hailed by Andrew Carnegie as "...one of the greatest sermons on peace that he had ever heard." Merrill was offered the presidency of Union Theological Seminary in 1917, but declined. He was elected Moderator of the Presbytery of New York in 1940, a position he held until 1942.

Merrill died June 19, 1954, in New York City, and is buried at Woodlawn Cemetery, in the Bronx.

== Selected publications ==
- Faith building. Quiet hour series. Fleming H. Revell. 1896. p. 77.
- Faith and sight: essays on the relation of agnosticism to theology. C. Scribner's sons. 1900. pp. 175.
- Footings for faith. Scribners. 1915. p. 141.
- Christian internationalism. Macmillan. 1918. pp. 193.
- The common creed of Christians: studies of the Apostles' creed. Fleming H. Revell. 1920. pp. 160.
- The freedom of the preacher. Lyman Beecher lectures. The Macmillan company. 1922. pp. 147.
- Liberal Christianity. The Macmillan company. 1925. pp. 170.
- Prophets of the dawn: Amos, Hosea, Isaiah, Micah, the beginnings of the religion of the spirit. Fleming H. Revell. 1927. pp. 173.
- The way: meditations on the way of life according to Jesus. The Macmillan company. 1933. p. 334.
- We see Jesus. Harper & brothers. 1934. p. 127.
