= Frank W. Asper =

American musician (1892–1973)

- Asper in 1948

Personal details
- Born: Frank Wilson Asper; February 9, 1892; Logan, Utah, US
- Died: November 8, 1973 (aged 81); Salt Lake City, Utah, US
- Resting place: Salt Lake City Cemetery; 40°46′37.92″N 111°51′28.8″W
- Occupation: Composer and also Mormon Tabernacle organist
- Spouse(s): Ellen Marie Connors; Florence E. Robinson

Frank Wilson Asper (February 9, 1892 – November 8, 1973) was an American composer and member of the Church of Jesus Christ of Latter-day Saints who served as Mormon Tabernacle organist from 1924 to 1965.

Asper came from a musically inclined family. He studied under Ebenezer Beesley as a youth and then studied at Stern Conservatory in Berlin and the New England Conservatory, Boston University, the University of Utah and Chicago Musical College. Asper also held an honorary degree for music, issued in 1938, from Bates College. Besides being Mormon Tabernacle organist, Asper was the organist of the First United Methodist Church in Salt Lake City, Utah from 1923 to 1937. He also toured as a concertizing organist.

Asper was a fellow of the American Guild of Organists.

== Works ==
Asper penned words and music for several LDS hymns. Seven of these are found in the 1985 hymnal Hymns of The Church of Jesus Christ of Latter-day Saints.

- 132: God Is in His Holy Temple – music
- 176: 'Tis Sweet to Sing the Matchless Love – music
- 189: O Thou, Before the World Began – music
- 222: Hear Thou Our Hymn, O Lord – words and music
- 245: This House We Dedicate to Thee – music
- 257: Rejoice! A Glorious Sound Is Heard – music
- 323: Rise Up, O Men of God (Men's Choir) – music
