= Hugh W. Dougall =

American Latter-day Saint hymnwriter

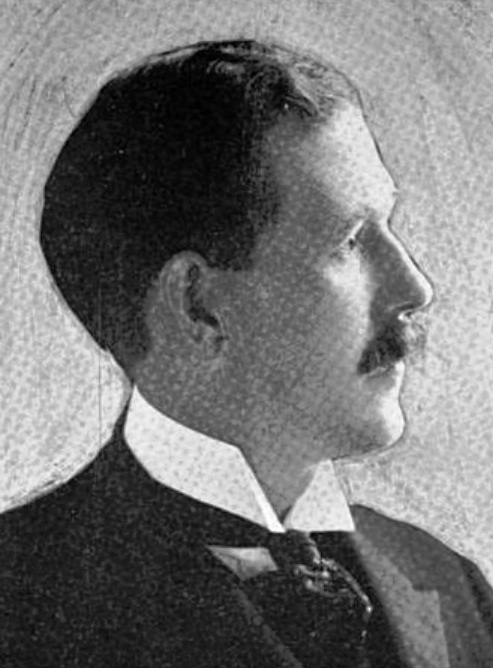

Personal details
- Born: Hugh Willard Dougall; March 6, 1872; Salt Lake City, Utah, United States
- Died: May 2, 1963 (aged 91); Salt Lake City, Utah, United States
- Resting place: Salt Lake City Cemetery; 40.777°N 111.858°W
- Occupation: Hymnwriter
- Notable works: "Jesus of Nazareth, Savior and King", "The Bridge Builder", and the music to "Come Unto Him".
- Parents: William B. Dougall; Maria Young
- Relatives: Brigham Young (grandfather)

Hugh W. Dougall (March 6, 1872–May 2, 1963) was a Latter-day Saint hymnwriter.

Dougall was born in Salt Lake City to William B. Dougall and his wife the former Maria Young. Dougall's mother was a daughter of Brigham Young.

Dougall served an LDS mission in the Southern States Mission from 1894-1896. Among hymns by Dougall are "Jesus of Nazareth, Savior and King" and the music to "Come Unto Him". His song "The Bridge Builder" was used extensively by the Young Men's Mutual Improvement Association in the early 20th century.

Dougall also served as music supervisor for Utah's Public Schools. Dougall was also involved with the Salt Lake Opera Company.

== See also ==
- Descendants of Brigham Young
