= George Careless =

American musician

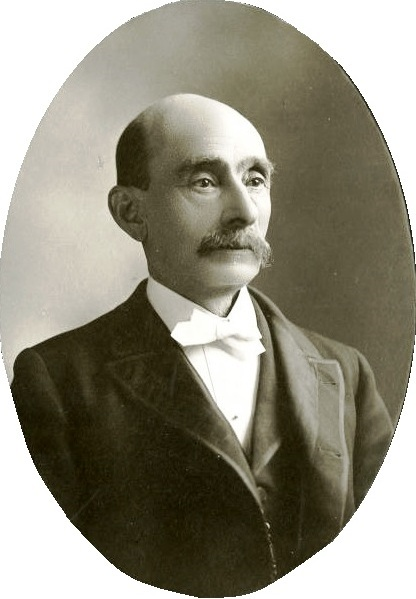

Personal details
- Born: George Edward Percy Careless; 24 September 1839; London, England
- Died: 5 March 1932 (aged 92)
- Occupation: Composer and conductor
- Title: Music director of the Mormon Tabernacle Choir.
- Spouse(s): Lavinia Triplett; Jane Davis

George Edward Percy Careless (24 September 1839 – 5 March 1932) was a prominent Latter-day Saint composer and conductor.

Careless was born in London, England. As a child he studied at the Royal Academy in London. He performed at Exeter Hall, Drury Lane and the Crystal Palace.

In the early 1860s Careless joined the Church of Jesus Christ of Latter-day Saints and in 1864 he immigrated to Utah Territory. It was after his ship had docked in New York City that he wrote a musical arrangement for Parley P. Pratt's hymn "The Morning Breaks, the Shadows Flee".

Shortly after settling in Salt Lake City, Careless became the conductor of the Mormon Tabernacle Choir as well as of the Salt Lake Theatre orchestra. He also conducted performances by the Salt Lake Opera Company. Among his students was the future conductor of the Tabernacle choir, J. Spencer Cornwall.

Besides "The Morning Breaks" (hymn #1), Careless also composed the music to the following hymns in the 1985 Latter-day Saint hymnal: #40 "Arise, O Glorious Zion", #122 "Though Deepening Trials", #145 "Prayer Is the Soul's Sincere Desire", #150 "O Thou Kind and Gracious Father", #178 "O Lord of Hosts", #186 "Again We Meet Around the Board", #191 "Behold the Great Redeemer Die" and #192 "He Died! The Great Redeemer Died".

== Gallery ==
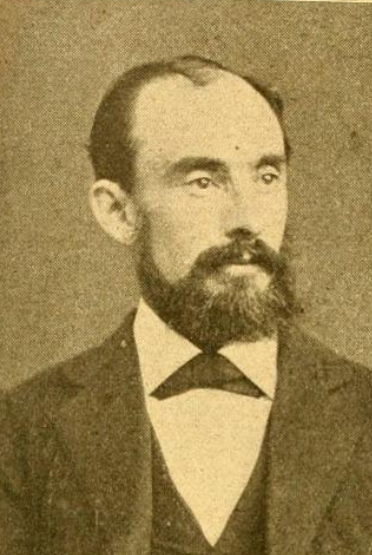
George Careless in the 1860s

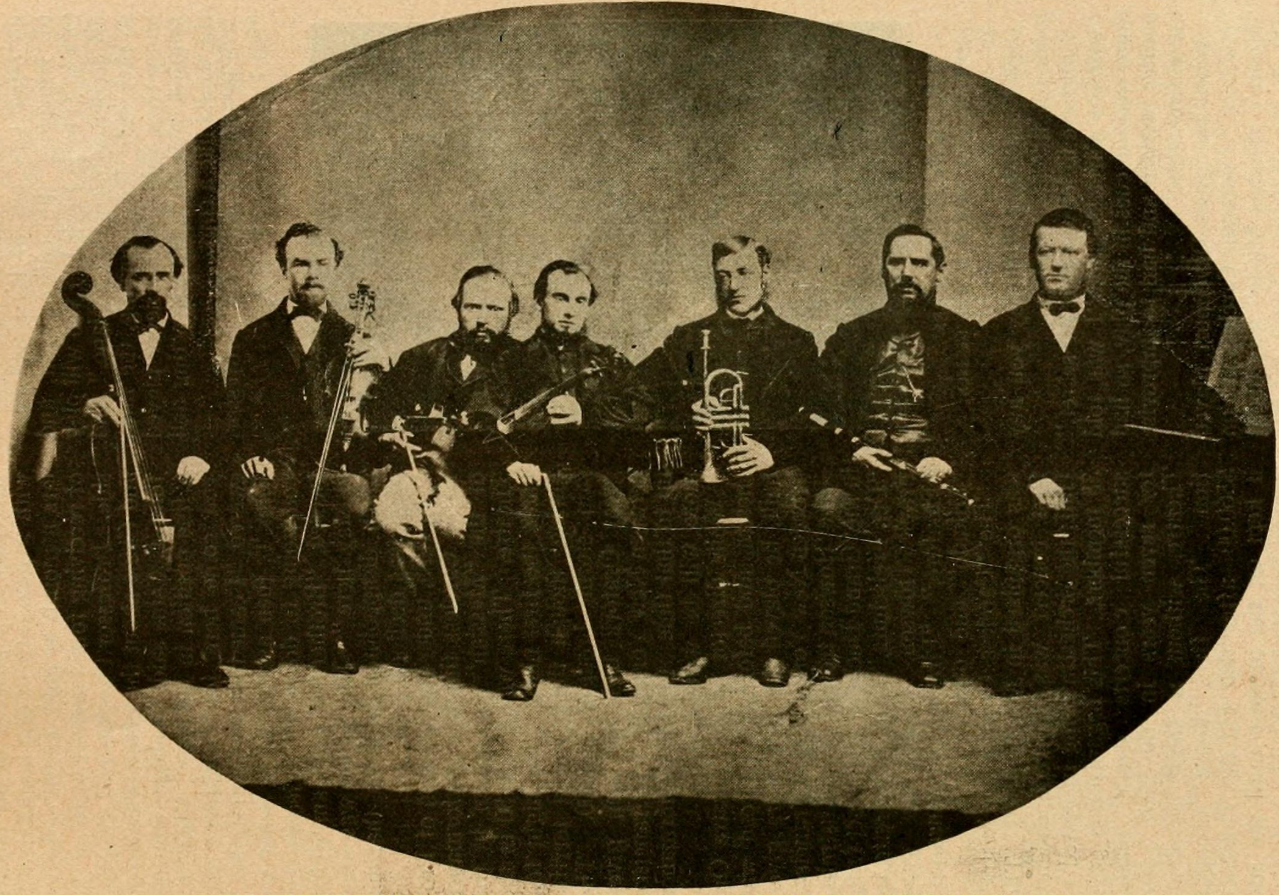
Salt Lake Theatre Orchestra 1868.From Left to Right: Joshua Midgley (Bass), Ebenezer Beesley (Cello), David W. Evans (Violin), George Careless (Director, violin), Mark Croxall (Cornet), Horace K. Whitney (Flute), Orson Pratt Jr. (Piano).
