= Frank I. Kooyman =

Dutch hymnwriter

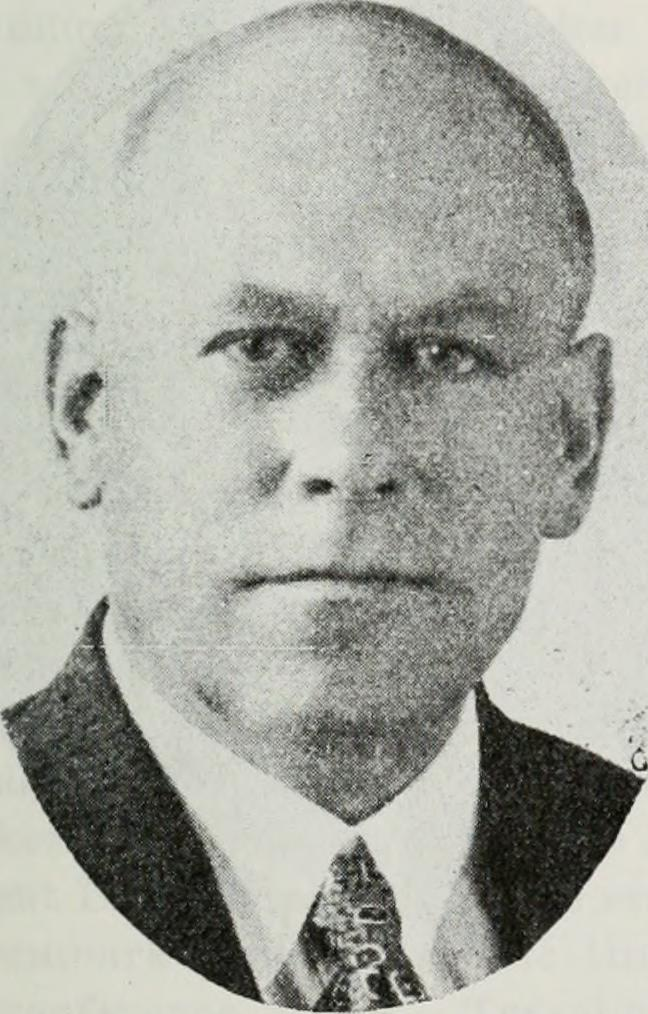
Frank lemke Kooyman

Frank Iemke Kooyman (Born Iemke Daniels Kooijman) (November 12, 1880 – September 13, 1963) was a hymnwriter who wrote several hymns used by the Church of Jesus Christ of Latter-day Saints.

Kooyman was born in Terschelling, West Frisian Islands, Netherlands on November 12, 1880. He moved to Amsterdam in 1897, and was baptized into the Church of Jesus Christ of Latter-day Saints in 1899. From 1902 to 1905 he served as an LDS missionary in the Netherlands. Kooyman spent most of his adult life living in Utah.

In 1929 he returned to the Netherlands as mission president and served in this capacity for four years, residing there with his wife and three children. He wrote many articles that were published in the local press while in this capacity.

While mission president, Kooyman translated at least fifty hymns into Dutch and published a Dutch hymnal. He later assisted in making new Dutch translations of the Book of Mormon, Doctrine and Covenants and Pearl of Great Price. He translated the temple ordinances into Dutch.

Kooyman worked in the office of the Church Historian on his return from the Netherlands. He was on the committee that compiled the 1948 English hymnal of the LDS Church.

In the current English edition of the hymnal are the following hymns for which Kooyman wrote the text:

- "In Memory of the Crucified" (Hymn # 190)
- "How Beautiful Thy Temples Lord" (Hymn # 288)
- "Thy Spirit, Lord, Has Stirred Our Souls" (Hymn # 157)
- "Thy Will, O Lord, Be Done" (Hymn # 188)
