= Karen Lynn Davidson =

Karen Lynn Davidson (1943–2019) was a Latter-day Saint hymn writer, author, and literary critic. Davidson wrote widely on the hymns of the Church of Jesus Christ of Latter-day Saints (LDS Church) and of the Community of Christ.

== Education ==
Davidson received her B.A. and M.A. from Brigham Young University. She then received her Ph.D. from the University of Southern California in 1973. She did post-doctoral research at the University of Cambridge and at the University of Chicago.

She taught English at Brigham Young University and was on the English faculty at the Mayfield Senior School.

== Music ==
Two hymns with texts by Davidson, "O, Savior Thou Who Wearest" and "Each Life That Touches Ours For Good", are in the 1985 English-language edition of the LDS Church hymnal.

Davidson was a member of the LDS Church's General Church Music Committee. She played violin with the Orchestra at Temple Square.

== Books ==
Davidson authored "Our Latter-day Hymns: The Stories and the Messages" published in March 1988 by Deseret Book Company.

Davidson was co-editor of one already-published volume and worked as a co-editor of another volume in the Joseph Smith Papers Project. She was also co-editor of "Out of the Black Patch", an autobiography of Effie Marquess Carmack published by Utah State University Press in 1999.

She co-authored Eliza: The Life and Faith of Eliza R. Snow with Jill Mulvay Derr.

In 2010 she received the "best documentary editing, bibliography award" from the Mormon History Association along with Derr for their collection of Eliza R. Snow's poetry. She received the same award in 2013 as part of the team that edited The Joseph Smith Papers: Histories.

== Personal life ==
Davidson was married to David Davidson, who died in 2016. She died on October 14, 2019, from pancreatic cancer.
