= Joseph J. Daynes =

English-American organist (1851–1920)

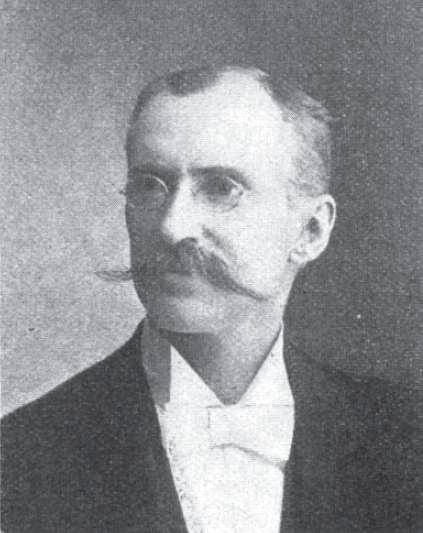

Personal details
- Born: Joseph John Daynes; April 2, 1851; Norwich, England
- Died: January 15, 1920 (aged 68); Salt Lake City, Utah, United States
- Resting place: Salt Lake City Cemetery; 40.7772°N 111.85800°W
- Occupation: Musician
- Title: Organist at the Tabernacle in Salt Lake City, Utah
- Spouse(s): Mary Jane Sharp
- Parents: John and Eliza Miller Daynes

Joseph John Daynes (April 2, 1851 – January 15, 1920) was the first organist at the Salt Lake Tabernacle and for the Mormon Tabernacle Choir. Daynes was born in Norwich, England, to John Daynes and Eliza Miller. The Daynes family later joined the Church of Jesus Christ of Latter-day Saints (LDS Church) and then immigrated to Utah Territory in 1862.

Upon their arrival in the Salt Lake Valley, Brigham Young met the group of Latter-day Saints with whom the Daynes family had traveled. Young heard the eleven-year-old Joseph playing the melodeon and declared: "There is our organist for the great Tabernacle organ." This declaration came true in 1867, when Joseph H. Ridges completed the building of the organ in the Salt Lake Tabernacle. Daynes had been sent to study music in New York. Upon the organ's completion, he became the first Tabernacle organist at age sixteen, a position which he held until 1900. Daynes also served as the music conductor of the 20th Ward Choir in Salt Lake City.

Daynes came from a very musical family. Though his father, John, was a watchmaker by trade, his hobby was music. The piano which John purchased in England is the instrument Daynes learned to play on. Daynes learned quickly—and largely on his own—and by age six participated in an organ recital. When the Daynes family left England for the United States, they brought several instruments with them, including the melodeon Young heard Daynes playing to entertain the other pioneers.

John Daynes continued to develop his love of music and founded Daynes Music in 1862, in Salt Lake City, a company which is still in business today.

Joseph Daynes married Mary Jane Sharp on November 18, 1872, in Salt Lake City. They had seven children.

Daynes was one of the main editors of the Latter-day Saints' Psalmody. He also wrote the music for many of the hymns of the LDS Church. The 1985 English-language hymnal of the church contains five hymns with music composed by Daynes, while the previous edition of the hymnal contained 27 hymns with music by him. Daynes also wrote several anthems. Among the hymns Daynes composed the music for are "Come Listen to a Prophet's Voice," "Now We'll Sing with One Accord," and "As the Dew from Heaven Distilling," which is the traditional closing hymn for the Tabernacle Choir's weekly Music and the Spoken Word broadcasts.

Daynes's son Joseph J. Daynes Jr. served as the first president of the Grant Stake in Salt Lake City. Daynes Jr. was also the president of the Western States Mission of the church, based in Colorado, and was married to one of Wilford Woodruff's daughters.

Evan Stephens, who conducted the Mormon Tabernacle Choir for many years while Daynes accompanied them, said of Daynes: "He was, without doubt, one of the greatest organists of his time. In my experience I never heard his equal as an accompanist for the choir and soloists and he was the very best sight reader I ever knew."
