= B. Cecil Gates =

Brigham Cecil Gates (August 17, 1887 – August 31, 1941) was an American music conductor and composer.

== Life ==
Gates was born in Laie, Oahu, Kingdom of Hawaii, to Jacob F. Gates and his wife Susa Young Gates, Americans from Utah Territory serving in Hawaii as missionaries for the Church of Jesus Christ of Latter-day Saints (LDS Church). He was the second of the couple's 12 children.

Following early training in music from teachers at Brigham Young Academy, John H. McClellan, and the New England Conservatory of Music, Gates taught piano in St. George, Utah.

From 1907 to 1910, Gates served as an LDS Church missionary in the Eastern States Mission, which was headquartered in New York City. He studied in the Scharwenka Conservatory of Music in Berlin from 1910 to 1913 and graduated with high honors.

On June 30, 1917, Gates married Gweneth Gibbs in the Salt Lake Temple. They were the parents of five children.

From 1913 to 1925, Gates was head of the Music Department of LDS University, the predecessor of LDS Business College. During this period, he assembled a faculty and began what later became the McCune School of Music. The school gained national recognition for the high quality of its administration and teachings.

In 1920, when the LDS Church organized its General Church Music Committee, Gates was one of its original 13 members.

From 1916 to 1935, Gates was assistant director of the Mormon Tabernacle Choir. He was a member of the General Board of the Young Men's Mutual Improvement Association from 1918 to 1929. With his sister Emma Lucy Gates Bowen, he organized the Lucy Gates Grand Opera Company of Salt Lake City in 1915 and conducted many of the world's great operas there. In 1926, Gates was appointed chairman of the Music Department at Utah State University. He also composed a significant number of choral and orchestral works, which are popular with people of all levels of musical background and ability.

Gates also served as director of the Salt Lake Oratorio Society.

Gates died in Salt Lake City after suffering from a debilitating illness for several years before his death.

== Legacy ==
The B. Cecil Gates Opera Workshop, part of the Franklin S. Harris Fine Arts Center at BYU, is used for rehearsal and preparation of student opera productions. It is also used as a large lecture classroom.

The Gates Opera Workshop is a rectangular room off the de Jong Concert Hall stage. An oversized doorway permits transporting large scene pieces back and forth from the stage area to the workshop room. A capacious storage area is located on the west side of the room, and access to it from the tunnel is possible, permitting trucks and equipment to be moved in easily (Special Program, 8).

Among works by Gates are an arrangement of The Lord's Prayer, the Easter cantata "Resurrection Morning," "My Redeemer Lives," "How Long Oh Lord Most Holy and True" (words by his brother-in-law, John A. Widtsoe), "Hear My Prayer," and "The Festival Overture."

== See also ==
- Emma Lucy Gates Bowen
