= J. Spencer Cornwall =

Conductor of the Mormon Tabernacle Choir

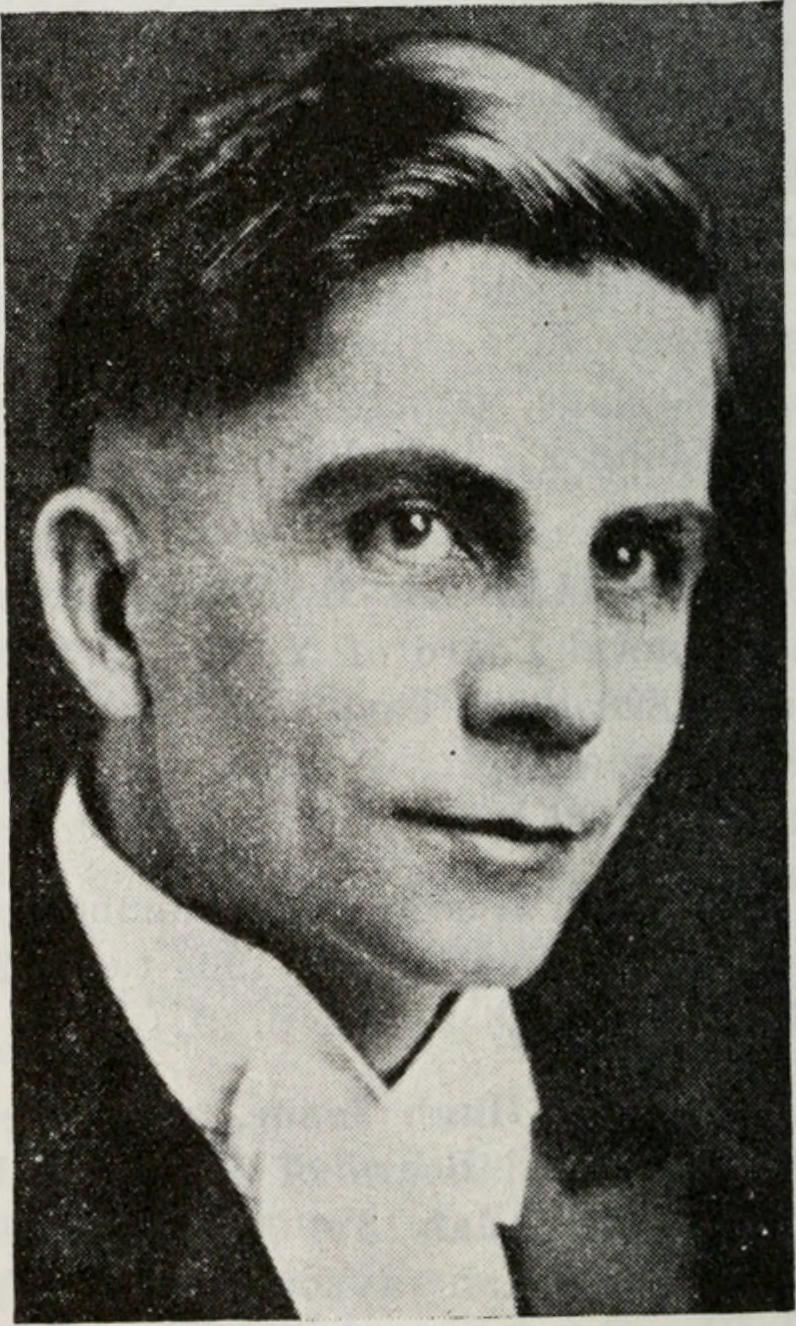

Personal details
- Born: Joseph Spencer Cornwall; February 23, 1888; Mill Creek, Utah Territory.
- Died: February 26, 1983 (aged 95); Salt Lake City, Utah
- Notable works: The Story of Our Mormon Hymn; Composed the music to "Softly Beams the Sacred Dawning": 1985 LDS Church hymnal #56
- Title: Conductor of the Mormon Tabernacle Choir
- Spouse(s): Mary Alice Haigh
- Children: 7, including: Carol Cornwall Madsen

Joseph Spencer Cornwall (February 23, 1888 – February 26, 1983) was a conductor of the Mormon Tabernacle Choir in the mid-20th century.

Cornwall was born at Mill Creek, Utah Territory.

Cornwall was the conductor of the Mormon Tabernacle Choir from 1935 to 1957. Under his leadership the choir made some of its first trips outside of the United States. Probably the most noted of these was when it performed at the dedication of the Swiss Temple.

Cornwall was also a writer. He wrote The Story of Our Mormon Hymns as well as a centennial history of the Mormon Tabernacle Choir, A Century of Singing, published by Deseret Book in 1958.

Among his early music instructors was George Careless.

As choir director, Cornwall tried to raise the level of performance in the choir.

Cornwall composed the music to John Jaques's "Softly Beams the Sacred Dawning," which is hymn #56 in the 1985 LDS Church hymnal.

== Personal life ==
Cornwall married Mary Alice Haigh. Cornwall first met her when her music instructor, Hugh W. Dougall, asked Cornwall to accompany a song by Haigh. Haigh performed widely after her marriage to Cornwall and was later a member of the Mormon Tabernacle Choir before and during her husband's time as director of the choir. The Cornwalls had seven children, the youngest of whom is Carol Cornwall Madsen.
