= List of Tabernacle Choir music directors =

The music director of The Tabernacle Choir at Temple Square is responsible for musical and creative supervision of the Tabernacle Choir at Temple Square, the Orchestra at Temple Square, the Temple Square Chorale, and the Bells on Temple Square, which are all official musical organizations within the Church of Jesus Christ of Latter-day Saints (LDS Church). Part of a group of 85 Welsh converts that immigrated in 1849, John Parry was invited by Brigham Young to organize a choir for the church's next general conference.

== Directors ==
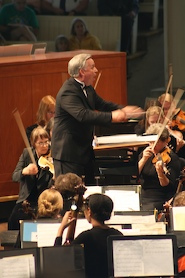
Craig Jessop.

Name	Years	Notes
John Parry	1849–54	Converted Welsh Baptist minister; organized the choir at the request of Brigham Young.
Stephen Goddard	1854–56	–
James Smithies	1856–62	Also member of the Nauvoo Brass Band
Charles John Thomas	1862–65	First director to lead the choir in the current Salt Lake Tabernacle building in regular performances
Robert Sands	1865–69	Directed the choir for the first performance in the Salt Lake Tabernacle, 1867.
George Careless	1869–80	Had previously directed the Salt Lake Theatre Orchestra
Thomas Griggs	1880	Appointed in absentia. Composer of the music to Gently Raise the Sacred Strain
Ebenezer Beesley	1880–89	Composed 11 hymns, which are still included in the current LDS hymnal
Evan Stephens	1890–1916	Directed the choir for its first recording, and was the first employed full-time.
Anthony C. Lund	1916–35	Directed the choir for its first national performance of Music and the Spoken Word on July 15, 1929.
J. Spencer Cornwall	1935–57	Directed the choir in the film This is Cinerama, and for its first performance abroad in 1955.
Richard P. Condie	1957–74	1959 Grammy Award for Best Performance by a Vocal Group or Chorus for "The Battle Hymn of the Republic".
Jay E. Welch	1974	Served from July to December before retiring for personal reasons
Jerold Ottley	1974–99	Directed the choir for numerous commercial recordings, including one with The United States Air Force Band that required special legislation in Congress to permit the Band to be published.
Craig Jessop	1999–2008	Along with the choir, was a 2003 recipient of the National Medal of Arts
Mack Wilberg	2008–present	A published composer who directed choirs at Brigham Young University.

== Works cited ==
- Porcaro, Mark David. Secularization of the Repertoire of the Mormon Tabernacle Choir, 1949-1992. University of North Carolina, 2006
- Pyper, George D. Stories of Latter Day Saint Hymns Their Authors and Composers. Kessinger Publishing, 2004. ISBN 1-4179-6856-7
