= Spirit of the Season (album) =

Live album by Mormon Tabernacle Choir and Orchestra at Temple Square
- Released: September 25, 2007
- Recorded: December 14–17, 2006
- Genre: Christmas
- Label: Mormon Tabernacle Choir, Universal Norway
- Producer: Mack Wilberg, Craig Jessop, Bruce Leek, Fred Vogler

Mormon Tabernacle Choir and Orchestra at Temple Square chronology
The Wonder of Christmas (2006)	Spirit of the Season (2007)	Rejoice and Be Merry! (2008)

Spirit of the Season was recorded during the Mormon Tabernacle Choir's 2006 Christmas concert "The Spirit of the Season," with special guest Sissel, joined by the Mormon Tabernacle orchestra and bells, conducted by Music Director Craig Jessop. The album was released in 2007 along with a concert DVD and reached No. 1 on the Billboard Classical chart within five weeks of its release and remained there for nine weeks. The album was also nominated for two Grammy Awards, Best Classical Crossover Album and Best Engineered Album - Classical. The recorded concert was also broadcast on PBS stations in December 2007 to more than 4 million Americans.

The album was the choir's first No. 1 Billboard Classical album. and topped the Billboard Traditional Classical Albums chart for nine consecutive weeks. The album was also released in Sissel's home of Norway via Universal Norway on December 10, 2007 due to high demand where it charted in the top 10.

== Track listing ==
CD
No.	Title	Performer(s)	Length
1.	"Bring a Torch, Jeanette Isabella"	Choir, Orchestra, and Bells	4:58
2.	"Wexford Carol"	Choir and Orchestra	5:01
3.	"Sunny Bank"	Choir and Orchestra	3:12
4.	"Hark! The Herald Angels Sing"	Choir and Orchestra with Sissel	2:34
5.	"In the Bleak Midwinter"	Sissel with Orchestra	3:24
6.	"In Dulci Jubilo"	Choir and Orchestra with Sissel	4:16
7.	"Mitt Hjerte Alltid Vanker"	Sissel with Orchestra	4:10
8.	"Noe! Noe!"	Choir and Orchestra	3:11
9.	"Maria wiegenlied"	Choir and Orchestra with Sissel	3:18
10.	"Spirit of the Season, from The Polar Express"	Choir, Orchestra, and Bells	2:35
11.	"Like an Angel Passing through My Room"	Sissel with Orchestra	5:00
12.	"The Bells of Christmas Medley (The Bells of Christmas; Carol of the Bells; From Every Spire on Christmas Eve; I Heard the Bells...)"	Choir, Orchestra, and Bells	4:25
13.	"Vitae Lux (Light of Life)"	Sissel with Orchestra	3:45
14.	"Lux Aurumque"	Choir and Orchestra	3:51
15.	"Silent Night"	Choir and Orchestra	5:33
16.	"Angels, from the Realms of Glory"	Choir, Orchestra, and Bells with Sissel	4:44

== Charts ==
Chart (2007)	Peak position
US Billboard 200	154
US Billboard Holiday	20
US Billboard Classical	1
US Billboard Independent	15
US Billboard Christian	11
Norwegian Top 40	8
