= Rejoice and Be Merry! =

Live album by Mormon Tabernacle Choir and Orchestra at Temple Square
- Released: September 30, 2008
- Recorded: 2007
- Genre: Christmas
- Length: 73:52
- Label: Mormon Tabernacle Choir
- Producer: Mack Wilberg, Craig Jessop, Bruce Leek, Fred Vogler

Mormon Tabernacle Choir and Orchestra at Temple Square chronology
Spirit of the Season (2007)	Rejoice and Be Merry! (2008)	Ring Christmas Bells (2009)

Rejoice and Be Merry!: Christmas with the Mormon Tabernacle Choir and Orchestra at Temple Square featuring The King's Singers was recorded during the Mormon Tabernacle Choir's 2007 Christmas shows in the LDS Conference Center with special guests The King's Singers. The album was released on September 30, 2008 and a concert DVD was released on October 21, 2008.

The CD features both a cappella and accompanied songs by the Mormon Tabernacle Choir and Orchestra at Temple Square featuring The King's Singers. Six tracks feature the King's Singers alone, with another five tracks featuring the combined Mormon Tabernacle Choir, Orchestra at Temple Square and King's Singers, the remaining eight tracks feature the Mormon Tabernacle Choir and Orchestra at Temple Square. The recorded concert was also broadcast on PBS stations in December 2008.

== Track listing ==
CD
No.	Title	Performer(s)	Length
1.	"Sussex Carol"	Choir, Orchestra, and Bells featuring The King's Singers	3:09
2.	"Carol to the King"	Choir and Orchestra	4:46
3.	"The First Nowell"	Choir and Orchestra	4:58
4.	"Deck the Halls with Boughs of Holly"	Choir and Orchestra featuring The King's Singers	3:46
5.	"El Niño Querido"	The King's Singers	3:02
6.	"La Peregrinación"	The King's Singers	3:12
7.	"Riu, Riu, Chiu"	The King's Singers	1:30
8.	"Rejoice and Be Merry!"	Choir, Orchestra, and Bells	5:20
9.	"Joseph Dearest, Joseph Mine"	Choir	4:29
10.	"Ding Dong! Merrily on High"	Choir, Orchestra, and Bells	2:50
11.	"O Holy Night"	Choir and Orchestra featuring The King's Singers	6:49
12.	"One December, Bright and Clear"	Choir and Orchestra	1:53
13.	"Rise Up, Shepherd, and Follow!"	The King's Singers	2:40
14.	"Little Drummer Boy"	The King's Singers	2:49
15.	"Jingle Bells"	The King's Singers	1:34
16.	"I Saw Three Ships"	Richard Elliott	2:19
17.	"The Twelve Days of Christmas"	Choir and Orchestra featuring The King's Singers	8:34
18.	"What Child Is This?"	Choir and Orchestra	4:59
19.	"Angels, from the Realms of Glory"	Choir, Orchestra, and Bells featuring The King's Singers	4:55
Total length:			73:52

== Charts ==
Chart (2008–2009)	Peak position
US Billboard Classical	7
US Billboard Christian	17
US Billboard Holiday	18
US Billboard Independent	30
