= The Wonder of Christmas =

2006 live album / compilation album by Mormon Tabernacle Choir and Orchestra

Live album / compilation album by Mormon Tabernacle Choir and Orchestra at Temple Square
- Released: September 26, 2006
- Recorded: 2001–2005
- Genre: Christmas
- Label: Mormon Tabernacle Choir
- Producer: Mack Wilberg

Mormon Tabernacle Choir and Orchestra at Temple Square chronology
The Wonder of Christmas (2006)	Spirit of the Season (2007)

The Wonder of Christmas was recorded during the Mormon Tabernacle Choir's 2001-2005 Christmas shows in the LDS Conference Center with special guests Angela Lansbury, Bryn Terfel, Audra McDonald, Frederica von Stade, Renée Fleming, and Walter Cronkite. The album was released in 2006.

== Christmas concert DVDs ==
The tracks were compiled from multiple Christmas concerts which were released individually as DVDs, including:

- The Joy of Christmas featuring Angela Lansbury (2003)
- Silent Night, Holy Night with guest conductor Walter Cronkite
- Christmas with the Mormon Tabernacle Choir and Orchestra at Temple Square: Featuring Frederica von Stade and Bryn Terfel (2004)
- Christmas with the Mormon Tabernacle Choir and Orchestra at Temple Square: Featuring Audra McDonald and Peter Graves (2005)
- Christmas with the Mormon Tabernacle Choir and Orchestra at Temple Square: Featuring Renee Fleming and Claire Bloom (2006)

== Track listing ==
CD
No.	Title	Performer(s)	Length
1.	"Joy to the World"	Choir, Orchestra, and Band of the United States Air Force Reserve	2:58
2.	"Whence Is That Goodly Fragance Flowing?"	Choir and Orchestra	4:52
3.	"Oh, Come, All Ye Faithful"	Bryn Terfel with Choir and Orchestra	3:59
4.	"Carol of the Bells"	Choir, Orchestra, and Bells	2:53
5.	"The First Nowell"	Frederica von Stade with Choir and Orchestra	5:17
6.	"Christmas Processional: Gloria in Excelsis Deo!"	Choir and Orchestra	3:58
7.	"Sweet Little Jesus Boy"	Audra McDonald with Choir and Orchestra	2:35
8.	"Children, Go Where I Send Thee"	Audra McDonald with Choir and Orchestra	2:34
9.	"Winter Wonderland"	Choir and Orchestra	2:55
10.	"We Need a Little Christmas, from Mame"	Angela Lansbury with Choir, Orchestra, and Bells	1:53
11.	"White Christmas"	Choir and Orchestra	4:11
12.	"Sleigh Ride"	Choir and Orchestra	2:46
13.	"Bring a Torch, Jeanette, Isabella"	Richard Elliott	2:55
14.	"What Shall We Give to the Babe in the Manger?"	Choir and Orchestra	4:17
15.	"Angels, from the Realms of Glory"	Renée Fleming with Choir and Orchestra	4:22
16.	"Hallelujah"	Choir and Orchestra, conducted by Walter Cronkite	3:32

== Charts ==
Chart (2004)	Peak position
Billboard 200	187
Billboard Classical	8
Billboard Independent	12
Billboard Christian	12
