= The Most Wonderful Time of the Year (Mormon Tabernacle Choir album) =

Glad Christmas Tidings

Live album by Mormon Tabernacle Choir featuring Natalie Cole
- Released: August 24, 2010
- Recorded: 2009
- Genre: Christmas
- Length: 65:32
- Label: Mormon Tabernacle Choir
- Producer: Mack Wilberg, Bruce Leek, Fred Vogler

Mormon Tabernacle Choir featuring Natalie Cole chronology
Ring Christmas Bells (2009)	Glad Christmas Tidings (2010)	Glad Christmas Tidings (2011)

The Most Wonderful Time of the Year was recorded during the Mormon Tabernacle Choir's 2009 Christmas shows in the LDS Conference Center with special guests Natalie Cole and David McCullough. The album was released on August 24, 2010 along with a concert DVD. A national PBS special of the show aired in December 2010.

== Track listing ==
CD
No.	Title	Performer(s)	Length
1.	"Processional: Come, O Come"	Choir, Orchestra, and Bells	4:46
2.	"Dance and Sing (Il Est Né)"	Choir, Orchestra, and Bells	2:44
3.	"It's the Most Wonderful Time of the Year"	Natalie Cole with Choir, Orchestra, and Bells	3:02
4.	"Grown-Up Christmas List"	Natalie Cole with Orchestra	3:43
5.	"Caroling, Caroling"	Natalie Cole with Choir, Orchestra, and Bells	3:12
6.	"For Unto Us a Child is Born, from Messiah"	Choir and Orchestra	4:20
7.	"O Holy Night"	Choir and Orchestra	6:32
8.	"The Holly and the Ivy"	Natalie Cole with Orchestra	4:27
9.	"Hark! The Herald Angels Sing"	Natalie Cole with Choir, Orchestra, and Bells	3:57
10.	"The Christmas Song (Chestnuts Roasting on an Open Fire)"	Natalie Cole with Orchestra	3:43
11.	"Good King Wenceslas"	Richard Elliott	3:11
12.	"Christmas Carols in the Air"	Choir and Orchestra	11:28
13.	"In the Bleak Midwinter"	Choir and Orchestra	5:47
14.	"Angels, from the Realms of Glory"	Natalie Cole with Choir, Orchestra, and Bells	4:40
Total length:			65:32

== Charts ==
Chart (2010)	Peak position
US Billboard 200	185
US Billboard Holiday	12
US Billboard Classical	2
US Billboard Independent	11
US Billboard R&B	31

=== Year-end charts ===
Chart (2011)	Position
US Billboard Classical Albums	16
