= Heavensong =

Heavensong: Music of Contemplation and Light

Compilation album by Mormon Tabernacle Choir and Orchestra at Temple Square
- Released: January 5, 2010

Heavensong: Music of Contemplation and Light is a compilation album released by the Mormon Tabernacle Choir and Orchestra at Temple Square.

The album reached topped the Billboard Classical albums chart. The album features guest artists Igor Gruppman (track 10) and David Foster (track 13). The Bells at Temple Square were also featured (track 1). The album was recorded live in the Tabernacle in Salt Lake City on September 8–12, 2009.

== Track listing ==
No.	Title	Writer(s)	Arranger	Length
1.	"The Shepherd"	Mack Wilberg, David Warner		2:33
2.	"Sheep May Safely Graze"	Johann Sebastian Bach, Katherine K. Davis	Katherine K. Davis, William Walton	5:10
3.	"Brother James's Air"	James Leith Macbeth Bain	Mack Wilberg	4:19
4.	"O Lord Most Holy (panis angelicus)"	César Franck, Arthur Ryder	Alexander Schreiner and Leroy Robertson, Mack Wilberg	3:48
5.	"Be Thou My Vision"	Translated by Mary E. Byrne, versed by Eleanor H. Hull	Mack Wilberg	4:08
6.	"Pavane"	Gabriel Fauré	Nathan Hofhiens	6:51
7.	"O Light of Life"	Mack Wilberg, David Warner		5:06
8.	"O Lord God"	Paul Chesnokov, English adaption by N. Lindsay Nordon from Psalm 104		3:58
9.	"Jesu, Joy of Man's Desiring"	Johann Sebastian Bach, Martin Jahn; English translation by Robert Bridges	Lucien Calliet	3:28
10.	"Meditation (from Thaïs)"	Jules Massenet		5:27
11.	"The Lord Is My Shepherd"	Howard Goodall		3:07
12.	"I Will Lift Up Mine Eyes"	John Rutter		6:54
13.	"The Prayer (from Quest for Camelot)"	Carole Bayer Sager and David Foster	Mack Wilberg, William Ross	4:50
14.	"Alleluia"	Ralph Manuel	Mack Wilberg	3:56
15.	"Benediction"	Mack Wilberg, David Warner		2:28

== Charts ==
Chart (2010)	Peak position
Billboard Classical	1
