= Anthony C. Lund =

American conductor (1871–1935)

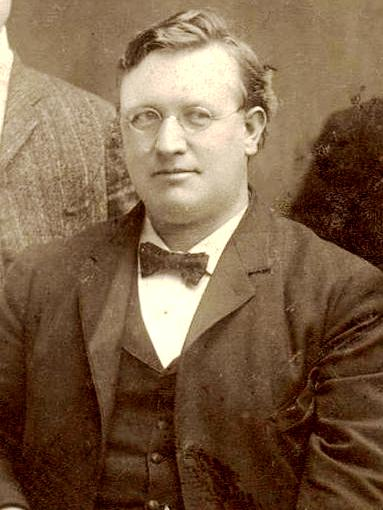

Music Director of the Mormon Tabernacle Choir
- 1916 – 1935
- Predecessor: Evan Stephens
- Successor: J. Spencer Cornwall

Personal details
- Born: Anthony Canute Lund; February 25, 1871; Ephraim, Utah Territory, United States
- Died: June 11, 1935 (aged 64); Salt Lake City, Utah, United States
- Resting place: Salt Lake City Cemetery; 40.7772°N 111.8580°W
- Spouse(s): Cornelia Sorenson
- Parents: Anthon H. Lund; Sarah Ann Peterson

Anthony Canute Lund (February 25, 1871 – June 11, 1935) was the director of the Mormon Tabernacle Choir in Salt Lake City, Utah from 1916 until 1935. Lund was also a professor of music at Brigham Young University.

== Early life and education ==
Lund was born of Danish immigrant Anthon H. Lund in Ephraim, Utah Territory. He began taking organ lessons at the age of eight. At 18, he was made choir director in Ephraim. In 1891, Lund graduated from Brigham Young Academy as valedictorian of his class. He then studied at the Royal Conservatory in Leipzig. He also did studies in London and Paris.

== Leadership ==
In 1895, at the age of 25, Lund served as the youngest member of the Utah Constitutional Convention, which allowed the Utah Territory to become a state in America. In 1897, Lund became head of what was then the Brigham Young Academy Music Department. Under his direction it was changed from being a department to being a school of music in 1901. He continued as head of the music department after the school became Brigham Young University. Lund served as the president of the BYU Alumni Association from 1904 to 1905. He also was on the faculty of the Utah Conservatory and the McCune School of Music. Lund served on the LDS Church's first General Music Committee, established in 1920.

Lund's left BYU to direct the Mormon Tabernacle Choir in 1916, and BYU had difficult replacing him. Lund replaced Evan Stephens as choir director. He implemented a European choral sound, and directed the choir in its first electrical recordings on the Victor Label. Lund held the position of choir director until his death in 1935. He was succeeded as director of the choir by J. Spencer Cornwall.

Lund also composed music. Some of Lund's most popular compositions include "Day Follows Night", "Build Thee More Stately Mansions, O My Soul", and "Bring, O Heavy Heart, Your Grief to Me". He worked in collaboration with Herbert S. Auerbach on these songs.

== Family and death ==
Lund married Cornelia Sorenson on December 21, 1902. The two met at Brigham Young Academy. They had six children together. Lund died at home on June 11, 1935, of a heart attack and kidney trouble. A public funeral service was held in Lund's honor on June 16, 1935. Over 6,000 people were in attendance of the services held at the Salt Lake Tabernacle. An additional memorial service was held in Lund's hometown of Ephraim the same day.
