= Ring Christmas Bells =

Ring Christmas Bells may refer to:

- Ring Christmas Bells (album), a 2009 Christmas album by the Mormon Tabernacle Choir feat. Brian Stokes Mitchell
- Carol of the Bells
