= America's Choir =

America's Choir: Favorite Songs, Hymns, & Anthems

Compilation album by Mormon Tabernacle Choir and Orchestra at Temple Square
- Released: 2004

America's Choir: Favorite Songs, Hymns, & Anthems is a compilation album released by the Mormon Tabernacle Choir and Orchestra at Temple Square. The choir was first called "America's Choir" by U.S. President Ronald Reagan. The choir has performed at the inaugurations of United States Presidents Lyndon B Johnson (1965), Richard M Nixon (1969), Ronald Reagan (1981), George Bush (1989), George W Bush (2001), and Donald Trump (2016). They also performed at the American Bicentennial, US Constitution bicentennial celebration, 2002 Winter Olympics (national anthem), and national broadcasts honoring the passing of US Presidents Franklin D Roosevelt and John F Kennedy.

The selections in this recording bring together favorite songs, hymns, and anthems from the Choir's repertoire. Other songs and anthems in this collection speak of the many facets of life: “Cindy” is a rousing folk song; “O Home Beloved,” a plaintive remembrance; “Come Thou Fount of Every Blessing,” a stirring tribute to the grace of God, “Climb Ev’ry Mountain,” the reach for dreams yet unrealized, “Battle Hymn of the Republic” the anthem that made the Choir famous.

== Track listing ==
No.	Title	Writer(s)	Arranger	Length
1.	"Alleluja Fanfare/Praise to the Lord, the Almighty"	German Hymn Tune, Joachim Neaner, trans. by Catherine Winkworth	Mack Wilberg	3:01
2.	"Come, Thou Fount of Every Blessing"	American Folk Hymn, Robert Robinson	Mack Wilberg	5:15
3.	"This Is My Father's World"	Trad. English Melody, adapt. Franklin L. Shepphard, Maltbie D. Babcock	Mack Wilberg	3:24
4.	"Hallelujah Chorus"	Ludwig van Beethoven		3:49
5.	"Fugue in C Major ("Jig")"	Dietrich Buxtehude adapt. by Mack Wilberg		2:13
6.	"Come, Come Ye Saints"	English Folk Song, William Clayton	Mack Wilberg	4:11
7.	"O Home Beloved"	Joseph Parry	Evan Stephens	2:29
8.	"Come, Let Us Anew"	attributed to James Lucas, Charles Wesley	Mack Wilberg	4:31
9.	"Bound for the Promised Land"	American Folk Hymn	Mack Wilberg	2:35
10.	"Shenandoah"	American Folk Song	Mack Wilberg	4:48
11.	"Cindy"	American Folk Song	Mack Wilberg	4:24
12.	"Danny Boy"	Traditional Irish Tune, Frederick E. Wetherby	Joseph Flummerfelt	5:26
13.	"Climb Ev'ry Mountain"	Richard Rodgers, Oscar Hammerstein II	Arthur Harris	3:22
14.	"Battle Hymn of the Republic"	William Steffe, Julia Ward Howe	Peter J. Wilhousky	5:19
15.	"Praise to the Lord, the Almighty (Reprise)"	German Hymn Tune	Mack Wilberg	2:29
16.	"God Be with You Till We Meet Again"	William G. Tomer, Jeremiah E. Rankin	Mack Wilberg	2:36

== Charts ==
=== Charts ===
Chart (2004)	Peak position
Billboard Classical	1
Billboard Independent	50
