= This Is the Christ =

Studio album by Mormon Tabernacle Choir
- Released: July 2, 2011
- Recorded: 2011
- Genre: Christian music
- Length: 65:41
- Label: Mormon Tabernacle Choir

Mormon Tabernacle Choir chronology
This Is the Christ (2011)	Glory! Music of Rejoicing (2012)

This Is the Christ is a studio album by the Tabernacle Choir at Temple Square with the Orchestra at Temple Square. The album reached #1 on the Billboard Christian Albums chart on July 2, 2011.

== Track listing ==
No.	Title	Length
1.	"This Is the Christ"	5:11
2.	"The Lord My Pasture Will Prepare"	3:17
3.	"Dear to the Heart of the Shepherd"	6:08
4.	"Come Unto Him"	4:28
5.	"Sunshine in My Soul"	3:23
6.	"Where Can I turn for Peace?"	4:14
7.	"God So Loved the World"	4:10
8.	"Our Savior’s Love"	4:36
9.	"O, Divine Redeemer"	5:37
10.	"Jesus, the Very Thought of Thee"	4:02
11.	"Nearer, Dear Savior, to Thee"	3:56
12.	"Softly and Tenderly"	5:48
13.	"Beautiful Savior"	5:58
14.	"I Believe in Christ"	4:53

== Charts ==
Chart (2011)	Peak position
Billboard 200	118
Billboard Independent Albums	20
Billboard Christian Albums	1
Billboard Classical Albums	1

=== Year-end charts ===
Chart (2011)	Position
US Billboard Classical Albums	12
