= Ring Christmas Bells (album) =

Live album by Mormon Tabernacle Choir featuring Brian Stokes Mitchell
- Released: August 31, 2009
- Recorded: 2008
- Genre: Christmas
- Label: Mormon Tabernacle Choir
- Producers: Mack Wilberg, Bruce Leek, Fred Vogler

Mormon Tabernacle Choir featuring Brian Stokes Mitchell chronology
Rejoice and Be Merry! (2008)	Ring Christmas Bells (2009)	The Most Wonderful Time of the Year (2010)

Ring Christmas Bells is a live album by the Mormon Tabernacle Choir. It was recorded during the Choir's 2008 Christmas shows in the LDS Conference Center with special guests Brian Stokes Mitchell and Edward Herrmann. The album was released on August 31, 2009 along with a concert DVD. A recording of the concert aired on PBS in December 2009.

== Track listing ==
CD
No.	Title	Performer(s)	Length
1.	"Processional on "God Rest Ye Merry, Gentlemen""	Choir, Orchestra, and Bells	5:31
2.	"Once in Royal David's City"	Choir and Orchestra	4:38
3.	"The Christmas Song/A Crazy Christmas List"	Brian Stokes Mitchell with Orchestra, and Bells	3:19
4.	"The Friendly Beasts"	Brian Stokes Mitchell with Choir and Orchestra	6:36
5.	"Through Heaven's Eyes, from The Prince of Egypt"	Brian Stokes Mitchell with Choir, Orchestra, and Bells	3:52
6.	"I Saw Three Ships"	Choir, Orchestra, and Bells	2:55
7.	"Whence Is That Goodly Fragrance Flowing?"	Choir and Orchestra	4:41
8.	"Sleigh Ride"	Brian Stokes Mitchell with Choir, Orchestra, and Bells	3:05
9.	"New Words"	Brian Stokes Mitchell with Choir and Orchestra	4:21
10.	"Jesu, Joy of Man's Desiring"	Brian Stokes Mitchell with Choir and Orchestra	6:29
11.	"Grateful"	Brian Stokes Mitchell with Choir and Orchestra	5:43
12.	"Go, Tell It On The Mountain"	Richard Elliott	1:56
13.	"And the Glory of the Lord, from Messiah"	Choir and Orchestra	3:03
14.	"Hallelujah, from Messiah"	Choir and Orchestra	3:45
15.	"Suo Gân"	Choir and Orchestra	5:05
16.	"Angels, from the Realms of Glory"	Brian Stokes Mitchell with Choir and Orchestra	4:35

== Charts ==
Chart (2004)	Peak position
US Billboard Holiday	4
US Billboard Classical	4
US Billboard Independent	13
US Billboard Christian	9

=== Year-end charts ===
Chart (2010)	Position
US Billboard Classical Albums	13
