= Bells at Temple Square =

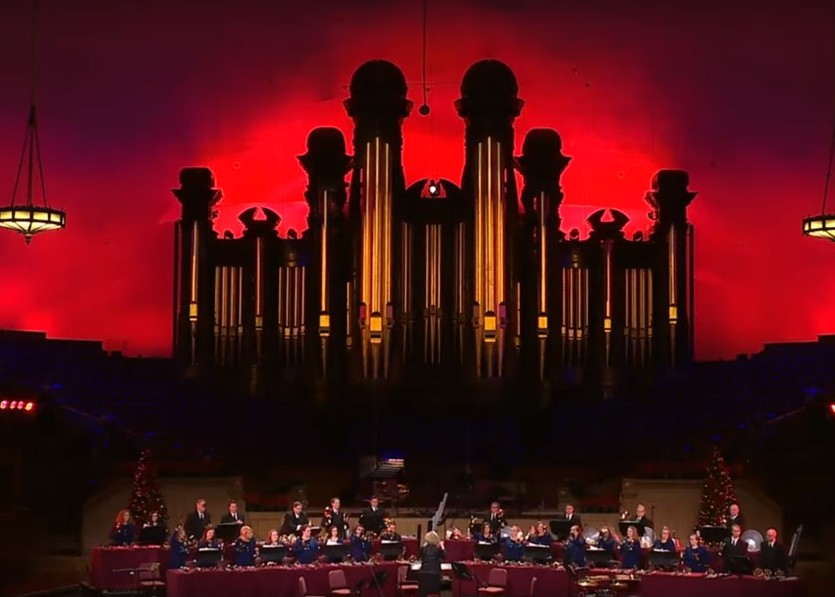
- The Bells at Temple Square performing in the Salt Lake Tabernacle

Background information
- Origin: Salt Lake City, Utah, United States
- Genres: Worship, classical
- Years active: 2005–present
- Labels: Mormon Tabernacle Choir Label; The Tabernacle Choir at Temple Square Label (current)
- Website: Bells at Temple Square

The Bells at Temple Square (formerly known as the Bells on Temple Square) is a handbell choir that is an official music organization of the Church of Jesus Christ of Latter-day Saints (LDS Church). It was formed in 2005 under the direction of the Tabernacle Choir at Temple Square (Choir).

The Bells at Temple Square is a double handbell choir, composed of 27 to 35 ringers on two sets of Malmark handbells (one seven-octave set and one 6½ octave set) and two sets of Malmark handchimes (six octaves each). The octave two bells are Malmark aluminum bells. Each part is usually doubled (played by two ringers on separate sets), except octave two.

== History ==
The Choir developed an interest in using English handbells in their performances, and Jerold Ottley invited the Wesley Bell Ringers to perform in the Choir's 1989 and 1999 Christmas programs. Craig Jessop also had his interest in English handbells sparked when he attended a Christmas concert at the York Minster cathedral when he was an LDS Church missionary. He purchased a set of handbells when he led The Singing Sergeants and had them ring and sing. When he later led the Choir, he borrowed bells from the Brighton High School at first.

After receiving approval from LDS Church president Gordon B. Hinckley and funding from a large anonymous donation, Jessop organized the Bells on Temple Square in 2005, with Thomas Waldron as the first conductor.

The Bells at Temple Square was selected to perform the closing concert at the 2017 National Seminar for the Handbell Musicians of America, held in Anaheim, CA. The group was also selected to perform at the 2023 National Seminar for the Handbell Musicians of America, held in Irving, Texas.

On May 8, 2020, it was announced that the Bells on Temple Square would now be known as the Bells at Temple Square, following the Choir's new visual identity.

== Performances ==
The Bells at Temple Square ensemble frequently accompanies the Choir in its annual Christmas concert and on the weekly Music and the Spoken Word broadcast. Additionally, the group performs semi-annual concerts, typically in November and June.

== Leadership ==
Thomas M. Waldron served as the group's first conductor from 2005 to 2011. LeAnna Willmore succeeded him in 2011, after serving as associate director since 2005. She retired in June 2024 and was succeeded by Geoff Anderson, who had served as the associate conductor since 2017. Mat Ulmer was called to serve as the associate conductor in spring 2025.

== Gallery ==
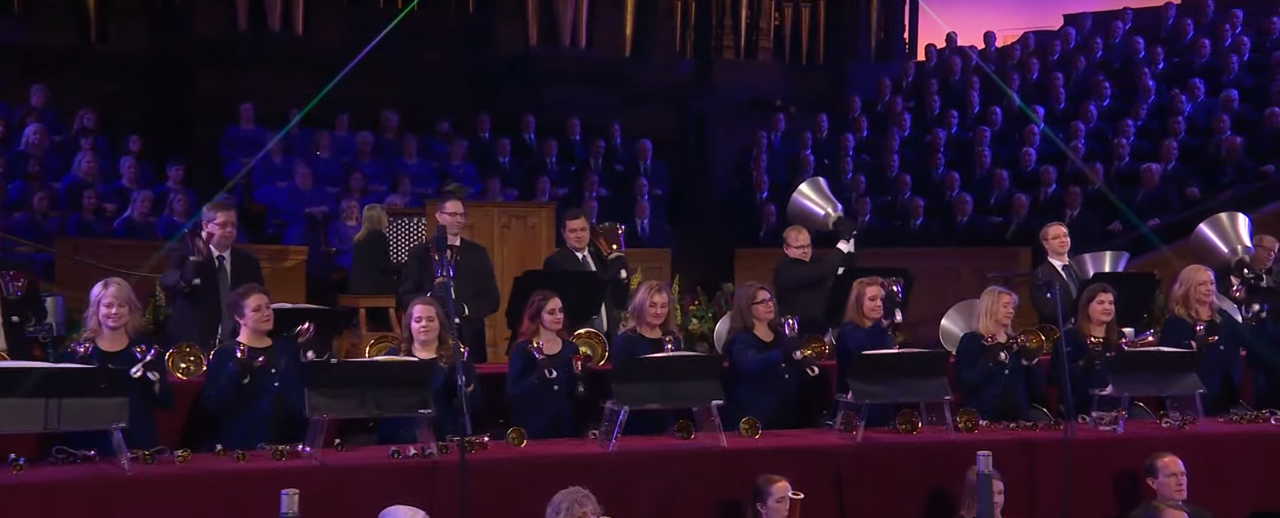
The Bells at Temple Square performing in "Music and the Spoken Word"

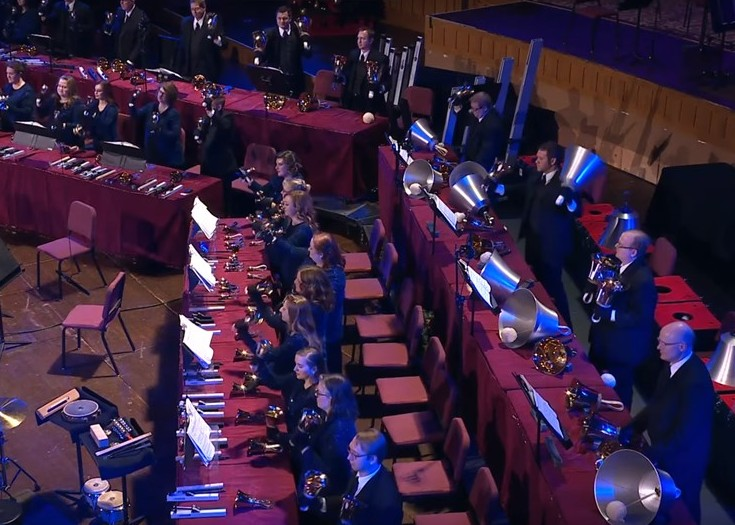
The Bells at Temple Square performing in the Salt Lake City Tabernacle

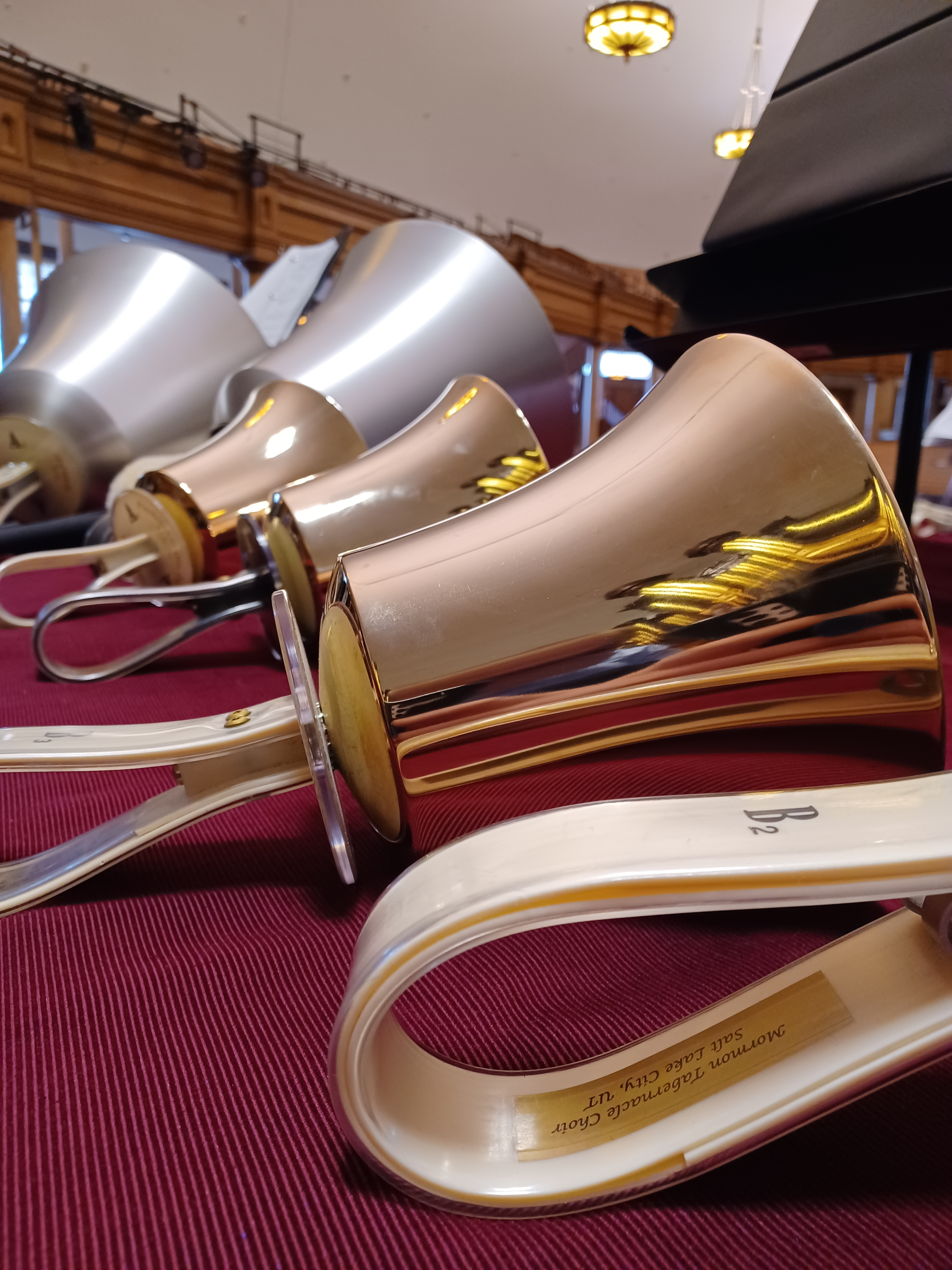
Handbells owned by the Bells at Temple Square in the Tabernacle

== See also ==
- Temple Square Chorale
- Orchestra at Temple Square
