= Mormon Tabernacle Choir & Friends =

Studio album by Mormon Tabernacle Choir
- Released: May 12, 2017
- Genre: Christian music
- Length: 44:47
- Label: Mormon Tabernacle Choir

Mormon Tabernacle Choir & Friends is a studio album by the Mormon Tabernacle Choir featuring several prominent collaborating artists including Sting, Yo-Yo Ma, David Foster, Amy Grant, James Taylor, Santino Fontana, Renée Fleming, Brian Stokes Mitchell, Sissel, Bryn Terfel, Angela Lansbury, and The King's Singers. The album topped the Billboard Classical Crossover Albums chart for the week of June 3, 2017, its second week on the chart.

== Track listing ==
No.	Title	Length
1.	"Fragile" (featuring Sting and Yo-Yo Ma)	4:22
2.	"The Prayer" (live; from Quest for Camelot) (featuring David Foster)	4:57
3.	"Thy Word" (featuring Amy Grant)	4:03
4.	"That Lonesome Road" (live; featuring James Taylor)	2:38
5.	"He Lives in You" (live; from The Lion King) (featuring Santino Fontana)	3:14
6.	"How Can I Keep from Singing?" (featuring Renée Fleming)	5:29
7.	"Through Heaven's Eyes" (live; from The Prince of Egypt) (featuring Brian Stokes Mitchell)	4:00
8.	"Vitae Lux" (live; featuring Sissel)	3:52
9.	"Homeward Bound" (featuring Bryn Terfel)	6:09
10.	"Beauty and the Beast" (live; from Beauty and the Beast) (featuring Angela Lansbury)	2:48
11.	"I'm Runnin' On" (featuring The King's Singers)	3:15

== Charts ==
Chart (2017)	Peak position
US Top Christian Albums (Billboard)	21
US Top Classical Albums (Billboard)	2
