= John Parry (Mormon) =

Welsh Latter-day Saint

John Parry Sr.
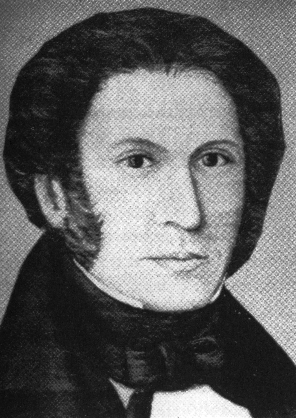

Personal details
- Born: John Parry; February 10, 1789; Newmarket, Flintshire, Wales, Great Britain
- Died: January 13, 1868 (aged 78); Salt Lake City, Utah Territory, United States

John Parry Sr. (February 10, 1789 – January 13, 1868) was an early Welsh convert to the Church of Jesus Christ of Latter-day Saints (LDS Church) and was the first musical conductor of the Mormon Tabernacle Choir.

Parry was born in Newmarket (now known as Trelawnyd), Flintshire, in north-east Wales. Prior to his conversion to Mormonism, Parry was a Campbellite minister and was the leader of a church in Newmarket called "John Parry's Association", which was fashioned after the teachings of Alexander Campbell. In 1846, Parry and his wife Mary Williams were baptized by Mormon missionaries. About the Parrys, one commentator has stated that they were "in all likelihood the most distinguished of the Welsh to join the Church up to that time, and [their conversion] caused great excitement among other Welsh Mormons".

In 1849, Parry and about 100 Welsh Mormons sailed from Liverpool to America. Upon arriving in Council Bluffs, Iowa, on May 17, 1849 Mary Parry died of cholera. Parry continued the Mormon pioneer journey to Utah Territory and arrived later in 1849.

At the October 1849 general conference of the LDS Church, Parry conducted 85 Welsh converts in singing several musical numbers. After the conference, church president Brigham Young invited Parry to formally organize a church choir that could provide music at future church conferences. Parry thus proceeded to organize what would later be called the Mormon Tabernacle Choir. Parry was the conductor of the choir until 1854, when he was succeeded by Stephen Goddard.

Like many early Latter Day Saints, Parry practiced plural marriage. In 1851, he married Patty Bartlett Sessions, and over the next two years he would marry Grace Ann Williams—a sister of his deceased wife Mary—and Harriet Parry, one of his first cousins. Parry was the father of 12 children.

Parry died in Salt Lake City and was buried there.

Edwin F. Parry, a son of John Parry, was a Mormon hymnwriter.
