= 100 Years: Celebrating a Century of Recording Excellence =

Compilation album by Mormon Tabernacle Choir
- Released: June 15, 2010
- Length: 154:40

100 Years: Celebrating a Century of Recording Excellence is a 2010 religious compilation album released on June 15 by the Mormon Tabernacle Choir to mark the centennial of its earliest recording (September 1, 1910).

The album has three disks, the first two are CDs, but the third one is a hybrid CD/DVD. the latter is pretty similar to DualDisc and DVDplus.

The album reached No. 154 on the Billboard 200 on July 3, 2010, No. 6 on the Christian chart (charting lower for 17 weeks), No. 21 on the Independent Albums chart and No. 1 on the Classical Albums chart (48 weeks total).

== Track listing ==
Standard edition disc 1
No.	Title	Writer(s)	Arranger	Length
1.	"Alleluja Fanfare/Praise to the Lord the Almighty"	German Hymn Tune, Joachim Neaner, translated by Catherine Winkworth		3:09
2.	"How Great Thou Art"	Swedish folk melody, Stuart K. Hine	Nathan Hofhiens	5:00
3.	"Morning Has Broken"	Traditional Gaelic melody, Eleanor Farjeon	Mack Wilberg	2:25
4.	"Brother James's Air"	James Leith Macbeth Bain, Psalm 23	Mack Wilberg	4:27
5.	"Jesu, Joy of Man's Desiring"	Martin John; Engl. translated by Robert Bridges	Orchestration: Lucien Cailliet	3:36
6.	"The Lord's Prayer"	Albert Hay Malotte	Carl Deis	3:30
7.	"The Impossible Dream"	Mitch Leigh, Joe Darion	Arthur Harris	3:49
8.	"Homeward Bound"	Marta Keen Thompson	Mack Wilberg	5:54
9.	"Old Time Religion"	Traditional	Benjamin Harlan	3:03
10.	"Climb Ev'ry Mountain"	Richard Rodgers, Oscar Hammerstein II	Arthur Harris	3:30
11.	"God Bless America"	Irving Berlin	Roy Ringwald	3:53
12.	"Call of the Champions"	John Williams, Olympic Motto		4:55
13.	"Come, Thou Fount of Every Blessing"	American folk hymn, Robert Robinson	Mack Wilberg	6:13
14.	""Hallelujah" from Messiah"	George Frideric Handel		3:55
15.	"Glorious Everlasting"	M. Thomas Cousins, Psalm 57	Arthur Harris	3:15
16.	"Betelehemu"	Via Olatunji, Wendell Whalum, traditional	Barrington Brooks	5:29

Standard edition disc 2
No.	Title	Writer(s)	Arranger	Length
1.	"How Firm a Foundation"	Attributed to J Ellis, Robert Keen	Mack Wilberg	4:36
2.	"Consider the Lilies"	Roger Hoffman	A. Laurence Lyon	5:26
3.	"Simple Gifts"	Shaker song, additions by David Warner	Mack Wilberg	3:13
4.	"Be Still, My Soul"	Jean Sibelius, Katarina von Schlegel, translated by Jane Borthwick	Mack Wilberg	4:58
5.	""Hallelujah Chorus" from Christ on the Mount of Olives"	Ludwig van Beethoven		3:57
6.	"Come, Come, Ye Saints"	English folk song, William Clayton	Mack Wilberg	4:20
7.	"You'll Never Walk Alone (from Carousel)"	Richard Rodgers, Oscar Hammerstein II	Arthur Harris	3:19
8.	"Shenandoah"	American folk song	Mack Wilberg	4:58
9.	"The Battle of Jericho"	African-American spiritual	Moses Hogan	2:40
10.	"Over the Rainbow (from The Wizard of Oz)"	Harold Arlen, E.Y. Harburg	Arthur Harris	4:44
11.	"Down to the River to Pray"	American folk hymn and African-American spiritual	Mack Wilberg	3:57
12.	"Amazing Grace"	American folk hymn, John Newton	Mack Wilberg	6:25
13.	"God Be with You Till We Meet Again"	William G Tomer, Jeremiah E Rankin	Mack Wilberg	2:45
14.	"Battle Hymn of the Republic"	William Steffe, Julia Ward Howe	Peter J Wilhousky	5:28
15.	"All People That on Earth Do Dwell"	Louis Bourgeois, metrical paraphrase by Rev. William Kethe		3:36
16.	"Danny Boy"	Frederick E Weatherly	Mack Wilberg	5:18

== Charts ==
Chart (2010)	Peak position
Billboard 200	154
Billboard Classical	1
Billboard Independent	21
Billboard Christian	6

=== Year-end charts ===
Chart (2010)	Position
US Billboard Classical Albums	15

Chart (2011)	Position
US Billboard Classical Albums	41
