= Glory! Music of Rejoicing =

Studio album by Mormon Tabernacle Choir
- Released: January 10, 2012
- Recorded: 2011
- Genre: Christian music
- Length: 63:02
- Label: Mormon Tabernacle Choir

Mormon Tabernacle Choir chronology
This Is the Christ (2011)	Glory! Music of Rejoicing (2012)

Glory! Music of Rejoicing is a studio album by the Mormon Tabernacle Choir. It topped the Billboard Traditional Classical Albums chart for five weeks in 2012.

== Track listing ==
No.	Title	Length
1.	"Hymn of Praise"	4:03
2.	"Pilgrim Song"	4:23
3.	"Look to the Day"	4:23
4.	""Wonder" from Dances to Life"	2:29
5.	""My House" from Peter Pan"	3:47
6.	""Exsultate Justi" from Empire of the Sun"	5:08
7.	"Glory!"	4:20
8.	"Psalm 148"	5:04
9.	""Cum Sancto Spiritu" from Messe Solennelle"	6:05
10.	""Blessed Be the Lord" from Messe Solennelle de Ste. Cécile"	3:13
11.	"The Holy City"	5:54
12.	""Nella Fantasia" (based on "Gabriel's Oboe) from The Mission"	4:10
13.	""Non Nobis, Domine" from Henry V"	4:26
14.	""Ode to Joy" from Symphony No. 9"	5:37

== Charts ==
Chart (2012)	Peak position
Billboard 200	179
Billboard Classical	1
Billboard Independent	21
Billboard Christian	11

=== Year-end charts ===
Chart (2012)	Position
US Billboard Classical Albums	28
US Billboard Traditional Classical Albums	3
