= Temple Square Chorale =

Chorale at Temple Square
- Origin: Salt Lake City, Utah, USA
- Genres: Worship, classical
- Occupation: Musician
- Years active: 1999–present
- Label: The Tabernacle Choir at Temple Square label (current)
- Website: Chorale at Temple Square

The Chorale at Temple Square (Chorale), formerly known as the Temple Square Chorale, is one of the musical organizations on Temple Square in Salt Lake City, Utah. The main purpose is to train its members musically for the Tabernacle Choir at Temple Square (Choir), which is a more rigorous musical institution.

== About ==
In response to a charge from Gordon B. Hinckley, president of the Church of Jesus Christ of Latter-day Saints, for the Choir to "get better and better," the Chorale was organized in 1999 as an in-service program for current Choir members, as well as a training venue for its applicants.

The first session of the Chorale began in July 1999, with Mack Wilberg as music director and a previous Choir director, Jerold Ottley, along with his wife, soloist and renowned teacher, JoAnn, co-directing the training school.

Under the leadership of Wilberg and the Ottleys, the Chorale conducted two 12-week sessions each year. Each session allowed the Chorale the opportunity to focus on major choral works—a luxury not often afforded within the rigorous schedule of the Choir. In the past, the Chorale has performed such works as the St. Matthew Passion by Bach, King David by Arthur Honegger, Requiem by Mozart and Saul by Handel.

Since 2009, Ryan Murphy, who is also the Choir's associate music director, has been the Chorale's director. As of June 2020, the training school is directed by Cherilyn Worthen.

On May 8, 2020, it was announced that the Temple Square Chorale would be known as the Chorale at Temple Square, in accordance with the Choir's new visual identity.

The Chorale's membership changes with each new three-month session. Each session includes new applicants who have passed the audition requirements for the Choir, which includes taped and in-person vocal auditions, as well as a detailed music aptitude exam. Additionally, Murphy works with Wilberg, now the Choir's music director, to identify current Choir members who participate to complete in-service training with the Chorale to hone and improve their musical skills. Total membership of the Chorale varies with each session, but it usually numbers between 70 and 80 members.

The culmination of each three-month session is the performance of a major choral piece. The Chorale is accompanied in these performances by members of the Orchestra at Temple Square.
