= Herbert S. Auerbach =

American politician (1882–1945)

- Born: October 4, 1882; Salt Lake City, Utah, U.S.
- Died: March 19, 1945 (aged 62)
- Military career
- Other work: member of the Utah House of Representatives

Herbert S. Auerbach (October 4, 1882 – March 19, 1945) was a prominent Jewish businessman in Salt Lake City and also a Republican member of the Utah House of Representatives.

== Early life and education ==
Auerbach was born on October 4, 1882, in Salt Lake City, where his father ran a department store. At age 15 he went to Germany to study at J. J. Meier School in Wiesbaden, then Lausanne, Switzerland. He then went to Columbia University where he received a degree in metallurgy in 1906.

== Career ==
He spent the next five years working with mines in Colorado, but from 1911 on spent his time running the family department store in Salt Lake City.

Auerbach also served as a member of the University of Utah board of regents, a major in the Ordnance Section of the United States Army during World War I, and a member of the Utah State Legislature from 1925 to 1929.

Auerbach also pursued studies in Utah history and was a poet and songwriter.

== Death and legacy ==
Auerbach died on March 19, 1945.

Although a Jew, his funeral was held at the Salt Lake Assembly Hall of the Church of Jesus Christ of Latter-day Saints with Frank W. Asper as organist and Jessie Evans Smith singing at least one solo.

== Sources ==
- bio of Auerbach
