= Grammy Award for Best Performance by a Vocal Group or Chorus =

Music award category

The Grammy Award for Best Performance by a Vocal Group or Chorus was awarded from 1959 to 1960. In 1961 the award was split into two awards for Best Performance by a Vocal Group and Best Performance by a Chorus.

Years reflect the year in which the Grammy Awards were presented, for works released in the previous year.

== 1959 ==
1st Annual Grammy Awards winner: Keely Smith and Louis Prima for "That Old Black Magic"

Other nominees:

- Kirby Stone Four – Baubles, Bangles, and Beads
- The King Sisters – Imagination
- Lambert, Hendricks, and Ross – Sing a Song of Basie
- The Kingston Trio – "Tom Dooley" lyrics

== 1960 ==
2nd Annual Grammy Awards winner: Richard Condie (choir director), for "The Battle Hymn of the Republic", performed by the Mormon Tabernacle Choir

Other nominees:

- Ames Brothers – The Ames Brothers Sing Famous Hits of Famous Quartets
- The Kingston Trio – The Kingston Trio at Large
- The Browns – "The Three Bells" lyrics
