= Jerold Ottley =

American conductor (1934–2021)

- Born: Jerold Don Ottley; April 7, 1934; Murray, Utah, U.S.
- Died: February 19, 2021 (aged 86); Salt Lake City, Utah, U.S.
- Education: University of Utah; University of Oregon
- Occupations: Music director; Conductor

Jerold Don Ottley (April 7, 1934 – February 19, 2021) was an American music director and choral conductor. He served as the director of the Mormon Tabernacle Choir (Choir) from 1974 to 1999. During his tenure, Ottley established the Choir's annual Christmas concert and appointed its first female organist. Prior to that, he was assistant chair of the University of Utah's Music Department.

== Early life ==
Ottley was born in Murray, Utah, on April 7, 1934, to Sidney and Alice Ottley. He studied choral conducting at the University of Utah, where he earned a master's degree. He was subsequently granted a Fulbright scholarship to study at the Academy of Music in Cologne, and later earned a doctorate from the University of Oregon. He became a faculty member at the University of Utah's Music Department and served as its assistant department chair.

== Career ==
Ottley first worked with the Choir as assistant director on a part-time basis. In 1974, he was requested to act as the Choir's musical director and accepted the position, succeeding Jay E. Welch. Under Ottley's leadership, the rules regarding the Choir became more restrictive; prospective members needed to have a recommendation from the lay leaders of their local congregation (ward or branch). This is recognized as giving the group a more religious direction. An attendance policy was also instituted and auditions came to be more formal and organized.

Ottley's duties with the Choir included the preparation and performance of nearly thirteen hundred weekly radio and television broadcasts of Music and the Spoken Word. He also led the choir in more than thirty commercial recordings and more than twenty major tours, in addition to regular concerts in the Choir's home in the Salt Lake Tabernacle. The group sang at the inaugural march of the 1981 inauguration of Ronald Reagan, who labelled them "America’s Choir". Eight years later, they performed at the inauguration of George H. W. Bush, who described them as "a national treasure". Ottley appointed Bonnie Goodliffe as one of the Choir's organists in 1988. She was its first female organist; Goodliffe later described Ottley as being "very forward-thinking". He also established the group's annual Christmas concert.

After Ottley retired in 1999, he was involved in volunteer work for four years as administrator and teacher for the Choir's Training School at Temple Square, as a Choir staff volunteer to revise the choral library computer database, as artistic advisor to the Salt Lake Interfaith Roundtable, and as bishop of his ward in the Church of Jesus Christ of Latter-day Saints (LDS Church). From 2005 to 2008, he directed the University Chorale, taught music education courses, and assisted in administration at Brigham Young University–Hawaii, a LDS Church-owned university in the town of Laie, on Oahu's north shore.

== Personal life and death ==
Ottley married JoAnn South in 1956, and they remained married until his death. She was an accomplished soprano who, like her husband, was a Fulbright scholar at Cologne's Academy of Music. Together, they had two children, Brent and Allison.

Ottley and his wife were diagnosed with COVID-19 in November 2020 during the pandemic in Utah. He died from complications of the virus in Salt Lake City, on February 19, 2021, at age 86.
