= Craig Jessop =

American academic, musician and singer (born 1949)

- Education: Utah State University, Brigham Young University, Stanford University
- Known for: Music director of Mormon Tabernacle Choir

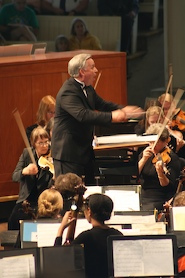
Craig Jessop conducting an orchestra

Craig D. Jessop (born 1949) is an American academic, musician, and singer best known for his tenure as the music director of the Mormon Tabernacle Choir (Choir) from 1999 to 2008.

== Biography ==
A native of Millville, Utah, Jessop has been a lifelong member of the Church of Jesus Christ of Latter-day Saints (LDS Church). He was a student of Robert Shaw and received a B.A. from Utah State University (USU), an M.A. from Brigham Young University (BYU), and a D.M.A. from Stanford University.

Jessop is a retired lieutenant colonel of the United States Air Force, where he was director of the Singing Sergeants from 1979 to 1987 and commander/conductor of the Band of the United States Air Forces in Europe from 1987 to 1991. He was conductor for Ramstein Community Choir/Rheinpfalz Community Choir from 1988 to 1991 and commander/conductor of the Air Combat Command Heartland of American Band from 1991 to 1995.

He has been the director of the National High School Choir Festival since its founding in 2005.

He has also spent seven years as a baritone with the Robert Shaw Festival Singers and performed in the choirs of Helmuth Rilling and John Rutter.

He began his career in education as director of choral activities at Granite High School in Salt Lake City.

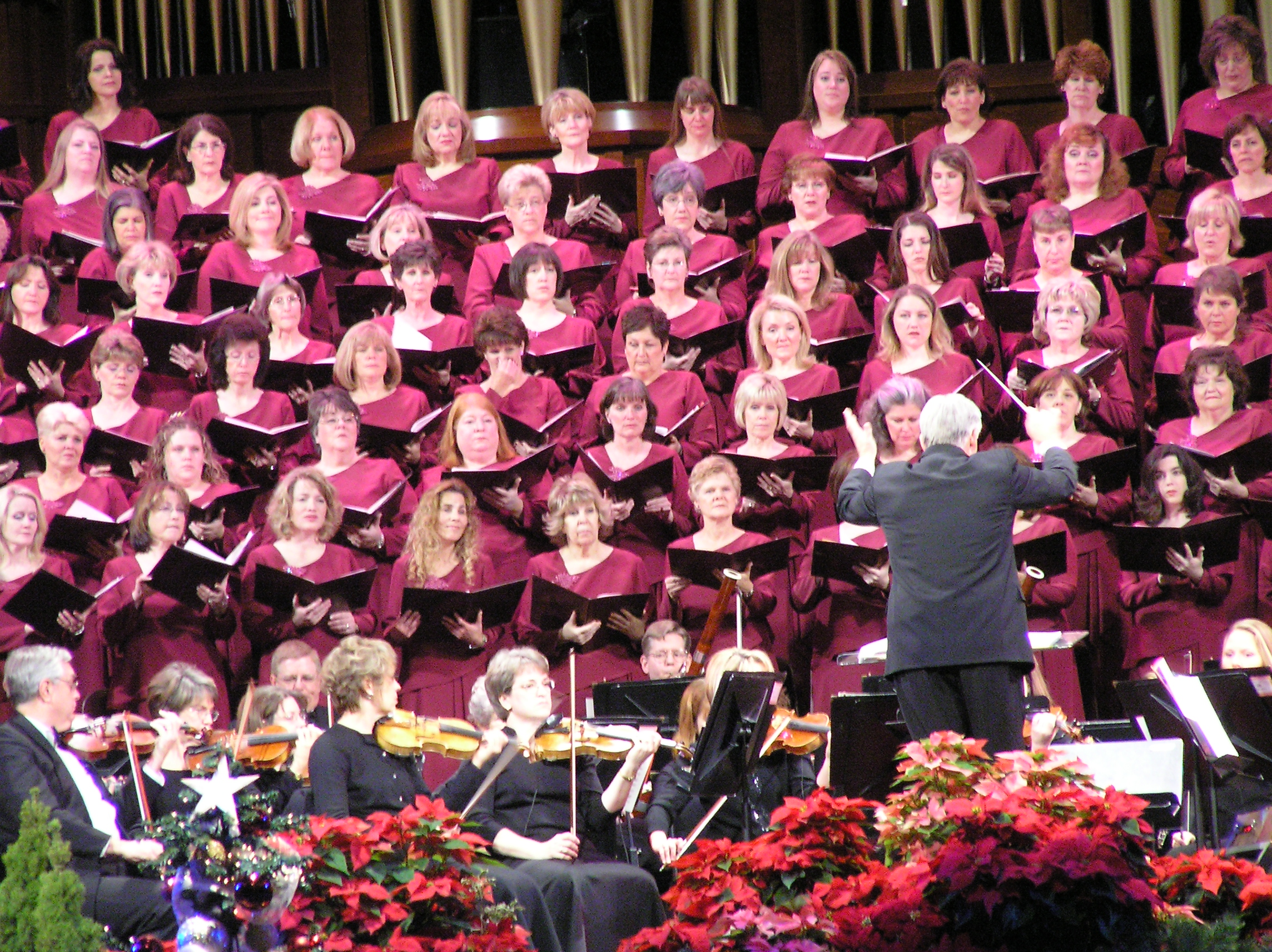
The Mormon Tabernacle Choir and Orchestra at Temple Square performing on December 3, 2005, in the Conference Center under Jessop's direction

Jessop was named Associate Director of the Choir in 1995 and became its director in 1999. Under Jessop's direction the Choir won many awards, including the Special Recognition Award from the International Radio and Television Society Foundation and a National Medal of Arts presented by George W. Bush. He served in that position until suddenly resigning on March 4, 2008.

=== Academia ===
Jessop became head of the Music Department at USU, in Logan, Utah, on May 5, 2008. He founded the American Festival Chorus, a new 270-member choir headquartered at USU. The choir performed with the USU Symphony Orchestra on November 11, 2008 in a Veteran's Day tribute. On November 15, 2008, the American Festival Chorus and Orchestra debuted with a performance of Mozart's Requiem. On February 28, 2009, Jessop was invited to guest conduct a special concert with BYU's choirs. On April 2, 2010, USU announced that Jessop would become the first dean of the Caine College of the Arts (CCA), which was created after the College of Humanities, Arts, and Social Sciences was split into two colleges: CCA and the College of Humanities and Social Sciences.

Since 2011, Jessop has served as Artistic Director for the National Memorial Day Choral Festival held annually in the John F. Kennedy Center for the Performing Arts in Washington, DC, sponsored by Music Celebrations International and the American Veterans Center. An uplifting and inspired program of patriotic music is selected each year by Jessop and is performed by choirs from around the United States to honor veterans past and present.

On December 22, 2012, Jessop conducted Joy to the World Christmas Musical Celebration Hosted by the LDS Church in central Oklahoma. The 60-member orchestra and 300 choir members are volunteers from many faiths in central Oklahoma, with the core membership drawn from 44 Latter-day Saint congregations.

From November 19–21, 2014, Jessop directed 440 of Nebraska's best choir members in the Nebraska Music Educators Association All-State Choir at the annual NMEA conference.

On November 16, 2015, Jessop conducted a concert called Through The Eyes Of A Child in Columbus, Ohio with the Hilliard Darby Symphonic Choir, Una Voce and the Columbus Children's Choir. The pieces included Count Your Blessings from White Christmas, Mass of the Children by John Rutter, and When You Wish upon a Star from Disney's Pinocchio.

On April 10, 2017, Jessop conducted at the WorldStrides Festival of Gold Honor Choir and Honor Orchestra in San Francisco. He conducted children in middle and high school at this prestigious event. This event took place at the Louise M. Davies Symphony Hall and the group performed "Proud To Serve".

In August 2018, after nearly 11 years as dean, Jessop announced his resignation from the CCA, effective June 1, 2019. He was replaced by Rachel Nardo. The announcement stated his plans to return as a professor in the fall of 2020 as a professor after a sabbatical.

== Personal life ==
Jessop and his wife, ReNae, live in Cache County, Utah, and have four children and ten grandchildren.

== Awards and recognition ==
Jessop received the 2013 Madeleine Award for Distinguished Service to the Arts and Humanities.
