= Brian Stokes Mitchell =

American actor and singer (born 1957)

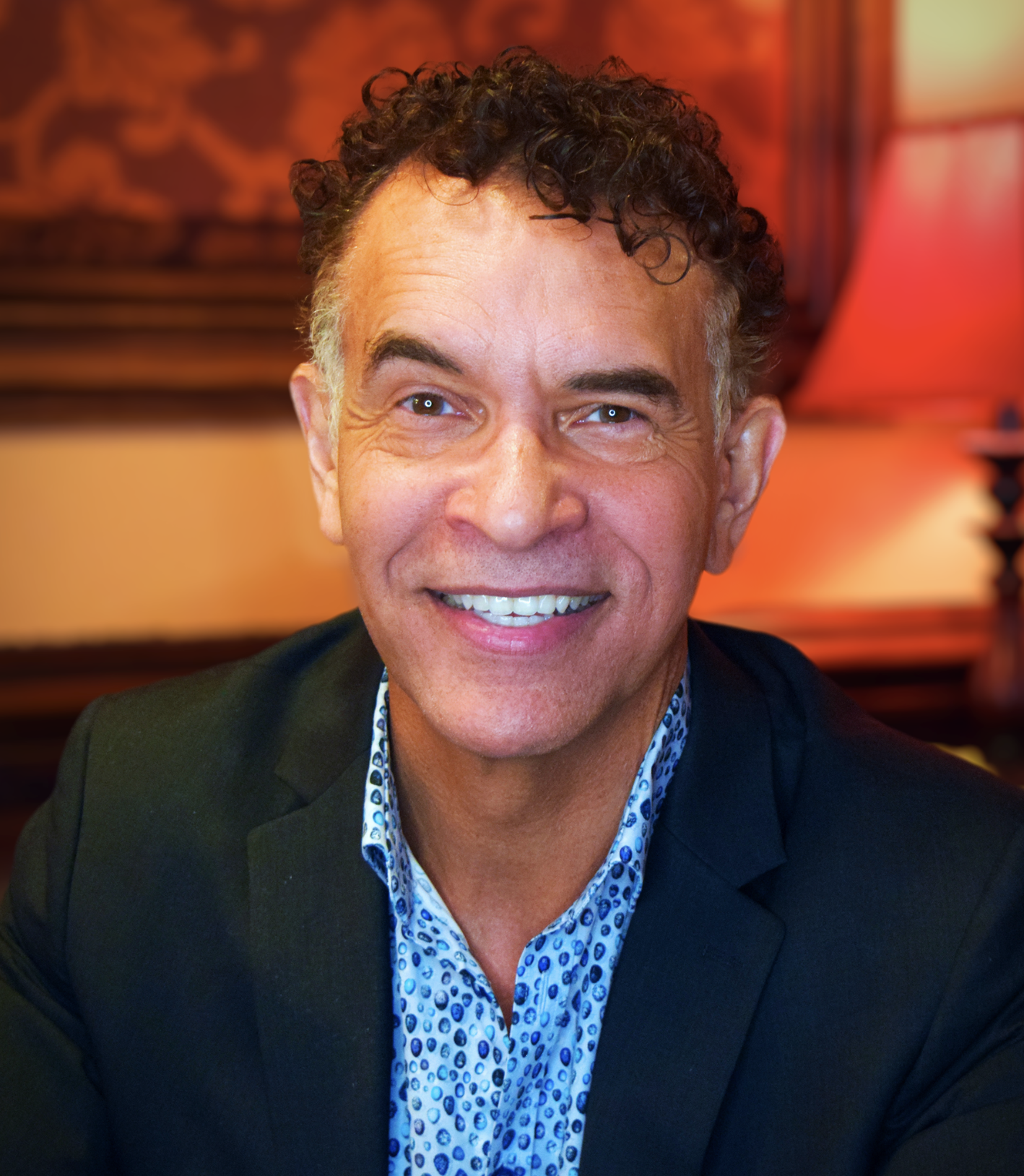
- Mitchell in 2018
- Born: October 31, 1957 (age 69); Seattle, Washington, U.S.
- Occupations: Actor; composer; vocalist
- Years active: 1979–present
- Spouse: Allyson Tucker (m. 1994)
- Children: 1
- Website: www.brianstokes.com

Brian Stokes Mitchell (born October 31, 1957) is an American actor and singer. A powerful baritone, he has been one of the central leading men of the Broadway theater since the 1990s. He has received numerous accolades including a Tony Award, a Drama Desk Award, Outer Critics Circle Award and a nomination for a Grammy Award. In 2016 he received the Isabelle Stevenson Award.

Mitchell won the Tony Award for Best Actor in a Musical for his performance as Fred Graham / Petruchio in the Broadway revival of Kiss Me, Kate (2000). His other Tony-nominated performances were in Ragtime (1998), King Hedley II (2001), and Man of La Mancha (2003). Mitchell's other notable roles include in Oh, Kay! (1991), Jelly's Last Jam (1992), Kiss of the Spider Woman (1993), Sweeney Todd: The Demon Barber of Fleet Street (2002), South Pacific (2005), Les Misérables (2008), Guys and Dolls (2009), Women on the Verge of a Nervous Breakdown (2010), Oliver! (2012), Camelot (2014), Shuffle Along (2016), and Love Life (2025).

Mitchell is also known for his television roles, including Dr. Justin Jackson in the CBS medical drama Trapper John, M.D. (1979 to 1986) and recurring roles on shows such as Frasier, Glee, Mr. Robot, The Path, Billions, and The Good Fight. He took the role of Walt in the CBS sitcom Fam (2019). He received a Grammy Award for Best Spoken Word Album nomination for The Complete Shakespeare Sonnets in 2001.

== Early life and education ==
Mitchell was born in Seattle, Washington, the youngest of four children of George Mitchell, an electronics engineer, and his wife Lillian (née Stokes), a school administrator. Mitchell is of mixed racial heritage, including African American, German, Scots, and Native American descent. Mitchell grew up at various U.S. military bases overseas, where his father, a former Tuskegee Airman, was a civilian engineer for the U.S. Navy. His mother, who earned a masters in social work, was the first African-American policewoman in Seattle. When the family settled in San Diego, California, he began acting in junior high musicals. He did not attend college, having begun performing professionally while a student at Patrick Henry High School, although he did have private teachers in both acting and voice in his teen years. He has said that he studied film scoring, orchestration, and conducting through UCLA. Prior to Ragtime, he was known professionally as Brian Mitchell.

== Career ==
Mitchell has a number of television and film credits, including the role of John Dolan in Roots: The Next Generations (1979), and a seven-year stint as Dr. Justin 'Jackpot' Jackson on Trapper John, M.D. from 1979 to 1986. Mitchell made several appearances as a celebrity panelist on episodes of $25,000 Pyramid and $100,000 Pyramid in the 1980s, and was considered one of the game's better celebrity players, helping a contestant win the $100,000 grand prize on the latter show in February 1986. Mitchell also participated as a celebrity panelist in four weeks' worth of episodes of The Match Game-Hollywood Squares Hour, a short-lived NBC game show that ran from 1983 to 1984.

Mitchell first performed on Broadway in the musical Mail in 1988, with music by Michael Rupert and lyrics by Jerry Cocker, winning the Theatre World award. His Broadway credits include an all-black revival of George and Ira Gershwin's Oh, Kay! (1990), Jelly's Last Jam (1992) based on the works of jazz artist Jelly Roll Morton, and Kander and Ebb's Kiss of the Spider Woman (1993). He played recurring roles as Hilary Banks' news anchor fiancé Trevor Newsworthy/Collins on The Fresh Prince of Bel-Air and supplied the singing voice of Jethro in the animated feature The Prince of Egypt (1998). He originated the role of Coalhouse Walker Jr, in the musical Ragtime, which opened on Broadway in January 1998. He received a 1998 Tony Award nomination for Best Actor in a Musical. He appeared in the 1999 revival of Cole Porter's Kiss Me, Kate as Fred Graham / Petruchio, winning the Tony Award for Best Actor in a Musical. He appeared on Broadway in King Hedley II in 2001 (Tony Award nomination) and Man of La Mancha in 2002 (Tony Award nomination). In 2002 he acted in Frasier as Dr. Frasier Crane's upstairs neighbor and nemesis Cam Winston. He played the title role in the 2002 Kennedy Center production of Sweeney Todd, part of the Stephen Sondheim celebration.

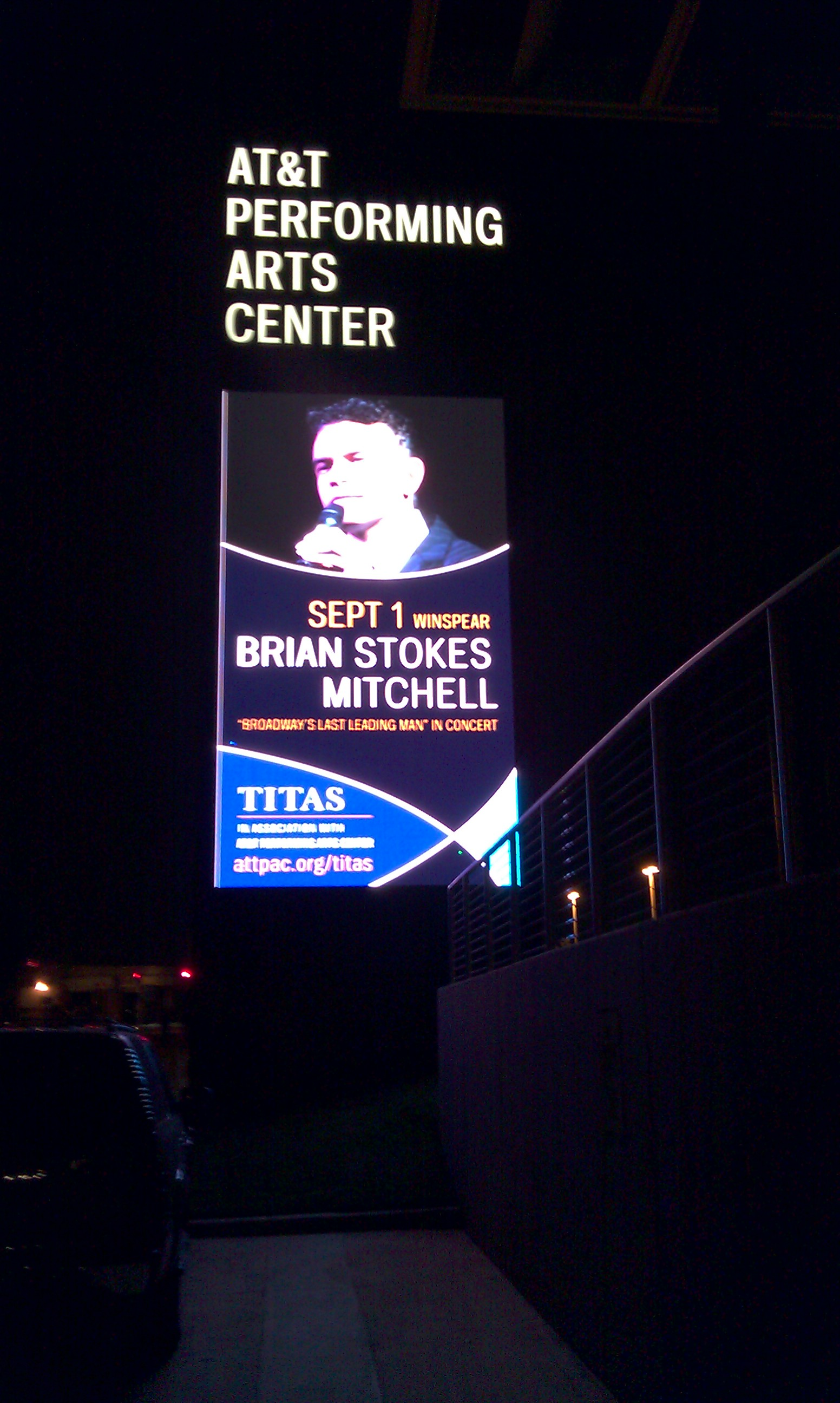
Brian Stokes Mitchell Concert Marquee outside the Winspear Opera House in Dallas, September 1, 2011

He appeared in the New York City Center Encores! staged concert productions of Jule Styne's Do Re Mi (1999), Bob Merrill's Carnival! (2002), Kismet (2006), and The Band Wagon in 2014. On June 9, 2005, Mitchell appeared in a concert version of the Rodgers and Hammerstein musical South Pacific at Carnegie Hall. He starred as Emile, alongside Reba McEntire as Nellie Forbush and Alec Baldwin as Luther Billis. The production was taped and telecast by PBS in 2006. Of his performance, Ben Brantley wrote in The New York Times, "As for Mr. Mitchell, his place in the pantheon of romantic musical leads is now guaranteed."

Playbill Records released his debut solo CD, Brian Stokes Mitchell on June 6, 2006. Mitchell has also performed in a Christmas concert with the Mormon Tabernacle Choir later released as a CD and DVD entitled Ring Christmas Bells. His second solo CD, Simply Broadway, was released October 30, 2012, by CD Baby. Mitchell returned to Broadway to star with Patti LuPone in the musical version of the Pedro Almodóvar film Women on the Verge of a Nervous Breakdown, which opened at the Belasco Theatre in November 2010. He guest starred in March 2010 in Ugly Betty as Wilhelmina Slater's ex-boyfriend, Don. He appeared on the 57th episode of Glee, titled "Heart" in 2012, and the 58th, titled "On My Way," as one of Rachel's dads (LeRoy) along with Jeff Goldblum.

He has also done voice-overs for animation including Animaniacs, Capitol Critters, Tiny Toon Adventures, A Pup Named Scooby-Doo, The Further Adventures of SuperTed, Kid 'n Play, New Kids on the Block, Scooby-Doo! and the Reluctant Werewolf, Gravedale High, Potsworth & Co., Captain Planet and the Planeteers, The Tom and Jerry Kids Show, Yo Yogi!, Fantastic Max, Pound Puppies, The Addams Family, California Raisins, The Angry Beavers, James Bond Jr., Batman: The Animated Series, Paddington Bear, Pinky and the Brain, Defenders of Dynatron City, The Hot Rod Dogs and Cool Car Cats, Droopy, Master Detective, Denver, the Last Dinosaur, Mighty Max, Don Coyote & Sancho Panda, Vampirina, and the two Flintstones animated movies Hollyrock-a-Bye Baby and I Yabba-Dabba Do!. Mitchell plays Nicholas Prophet in Wolverine: The Long Night, a scripted podcast serial.

He also played a recurring role on the USA Network series Mr. Robot as Scott Knowles, CTO of E Corp. The series began in June 2015 and ended in December 2019. A new musical titled Shuffle Along, or, the Making of the Musical Sensation of 1921 and All That Followed, based on the making of Shuffle Along, opened on Broadway on March 14, 2016, in previews and officially on April 21 at the Music Box Theatre. Mitchell played F.E. Miller, with Audra McDonald as Lottie Gee, Billy Porter, Joshua Henry and Brandon Victor Dixon.

== Personal life ==
He has been married to actress Allyson Tucker since 1994 and has a son, Ellington.

== Filmography ==
=== Film ===
Year	Title	Role(s)	Notes
1990	Ghost Dad	Teacher	
1998	The Prince of Egypt	Jethro	Singing voice
2001	Call Me Claus	Cameron	
2001	Ruby’s Bucket of Blood	Earl Delacroix	
2005	One Last Thing...	Dr. Emerson	
2011	Jumping the Broom	Mr. Watson	
2018	Mapplethorpe	Father Stack	
2021	Tick, Tick... Boom!	"Sunday" Legend	
2024	Shirley	Stanley Townsend	

=== Television ===
Year	Title	Role(s)	Notes
1979	The White Shadow	Lucius Robinson	Episode: "Spare the Rod"
1979	Roots: The Next Generations	John Dolan	Episode: "Part 1 (1882–1883)"
1979–1986	Trapper John, M.D.	Dr. Justin "Jackpot" Jackson	151 episodes
1985	Hotel	Lucas Todd	Episode: "Resolutions"
1985	The Love Boat	Jeffrey Niver	Season 6 – Episode: 16
1987	227	Ed	Episode: "The Honeymoon's Over"
1987	Pound Puppies	Nahook	Episode: "Snow Puppies"
1987	Houston Knights	Nat Holliday	Episode: "Moving Violation"
1987	Foofur	Various roles	Voice; 13 episodes
1987	ALF	Nathan Pearl	Episode: "Hail to the Chief"
1988	Night Court	Mr. Morley	Episode: "Another Day in the Life"
1988	Scooby-Doo! and the Reluctant Werewolf	Bonejangles	Voice; Television movie
1988–1989	Fantastic Max	Additional voices	Voice; 3 episodes
1989	The Further Adventures of SuperTed	Narrator	Voice; 13 episodes
1989	Generations	David Jeffries	2 episodes
1989	A Pup Named Scooby-Doo	Buddy Chillner	Voice; Episode: "The Spirit of Rock'n Roll"
1989	The California Raisin Show	Red	Voice; Episode: "The Apple, Raisin Style"
1989–1990	Paddington Bear	Additional voices	Voice; 2 episodes
1990	Mancuso, F.B.I.	Performer	2 episodes
1990	Midnight Patrol: Adventures in the Dream Zone	Various roles	Voice; 13 episodes
1990	Tiny Toon Adventures	Vinnie	Voice; Episode: "Mr. Popular's Rules of Cool"!
1990	New Kids on the Block	Danny Wood	Voice; 16 episodes
1991	James Bond Jr.	Coach Mitchell	Voice; 14 episodes
1992	Batman: The Animated Series	Brian Rogers	Voice; Episode: "Fear of Victory"
1993	Animaniacs	Noodles	2 episodes
1992–1993	The Fresh Prince of Bel-Air	Trevor	6 episodes
1992–1993	The Addams Family	Additional roles	Voices; 21 episodes
1992–1995	Capitol Critters	Various roles	Voice; 6 episodes
1996	In the House	Dr. Stone Clarke	Episode: "Three the Hard Way"
1999	Double Platinum	Adam Harris	Television movie
2001	Call Me Claus	Cameron	Television movie
2002	Frasier	Cam Winston	3 episodes
2002	Crossing Jordan	D.A. Jay Myers	2 episodes
2010	Ugly Betty	Don Jones	Episode: "Fire and Nice"
2012–2015	Glee	LeRoy Berry	3 episodes
2014	Madam Secretary	Vincent Marsh	Episode: "So it Goes"
2015–2016	Mr. Robot	Scott Knowles	8 episodes
2016–2018	The Path	Bill	7 episodes
2017	The Blacklist	David Levine	2 episodes
2017	Bull	Perry Sinclair	Episode: "School for Scandal"
2017–2021	Vampirina	Grandpop	Voice; 13 episodes
2018	Billions	Alvin Epstein	2 episodes
2018	The Good Fight	Rod Habercore	2 episodes
2018	Elementary	Dominic Voth	Episode: "Bits and Pieces"
2019	Fam	Walt	13 episodes
2020	Prodigal Son	Everett Sterling	2 episodes
2021	Evil	Father Mulvehill	4 episodes
2021	Centaurworld	The Nowhere King/Elktaur	Voice; 4 episodes
2023	Up Here	Ted McGooch	2 episodes
2023	East New York	Detective Ken Corley	3 episodes
2023	Run the World	Arnold Greene	Episode: "Homecoming"
2025	The Gilded Age	Frederick Kirkland	Recurring cast; season 3

=== Video games ===
Year	Title	Role(s)	Notes
2014	Watch Dogs	Additional voices	Voice

== Theatre ==
Year	Title	Role(s)	Venue
1988	Mail	Franklin	Music Box Theatre, Broadway
1991	Oh, Kay!	Jimmy Winter	Richard Rogers Theatre, Broadway
1992–1993	Jelly's Last Jam	Jelly Roll Morton	Virginia Theatre, Broadway
1993–1995	Kiss of the Spider Woman	Valentin Arregui Paz	Broadhurst Theatre, Broadway
1996–1997	Ragtime	Coalhouse Walker, Jr.	Meridian Arts Centre, Toronto
1997	Ragtime	Coalhouse Walker, Jr.	Shubert Theatre, Los Angeles
1998	Ragtime	Coalhouse Walker, Jr.	Ford Center for the Performing Arts, Broadway
1998	Sweet Charity	Oscar Lindquist	Avery Fisher Hall
1999–2001	Kiss Me, Kate	Fred Graham / Petruchio	Martin Beck Theatre, Broadway
2000	The Frogs	Xanthias / Pluto	Library of Congress, Washington, DC
2001	King Hedley II	King	Kennedy Center; Virginia Theatre, Broadway
2002	Sweeney Todd: The Demon Barber of Fleet Street	Sweeney Todd	Kennedy Center
2002–2003	Man of La Mancha	Don Quixote / Miguel de Cervantes	National Theatre, Washington, D.C. Martin Beck Theatre, Broadway
2003	The Exonerated	Performer	Bleecker Street Theater, Off-Broadway
2005	South Pacific	Emile de Becque	Carnegie Hall
2006	Kismet	Hajj	Encores!, Off-Broadway
2007	South Pacific	Emile de Becque	Hollywood Bowl
2008	Les Misérables	Inspector Javert	Hollywood Bowl
2009	Guys and Dolls	Sky Masterson	Hollywood Bowl
2010–2011	Women on the Verge of a Nervous Breakdown	Ivan	Belasco Theatre, Broadway
2012	Oliver!	Fagin	Shubert Theatre, Broadway
2014	Camelot	King Arthur	Kennedy Center
2014	Much Ado About Nothing	Don Pedro	Delacorte Theater, Off-Broadway
2014	The Band Wagon	Tony Hunter	Encores!, Off-Broadway
2016	Shuffle Along	F.E. Miller	Music Box Theatre, Broadway
2016	Ragtime	Narrator	Ellis Island
2016	White Rabbit Red Rabbit	Performer	Westside Theatre, Off-Broadway
2019	The Light in the Piazza	Signor Naccarelli	Los Angeles Opera
2023	Ragtime	Coalhouse Walker, Jr.	Minskoff Theatre, Broadway
2025	Love Life	Sam Cooper	New York City Center, Encores!
2026	Shuffle Along	F.E. Miller	Lincoln Center
2027	The Prince of Egypt	Jethro	Lincoln Center

== Discography ==
- Brian Stokes Mitchell (June 6, 2006)
  - Track listing
1. "Something's Coming" (West Side Story)
2. "The Best Is Yet to Come" (Cy Coleman)
3. "Pretty Women" (Sweeney Todd)
4. "Just In Time" (Bells are Ringing)
5. "Lazy Afternoon" (The Golden Apple)
6. "Another Hundred People" (Company)/"Take the 'A' Train"
7. "How Long Has This Been Going On?" (Funny Face)
8. "Life is Sweet" (Wonderful Town)
9. "Losing My Mind" (Follies)
10. "Being Alive" (Company)
11. "How Glory Goes" (Floyd Collins)
12. "Grateful"
- Simply Broadway (2012)
- Plays With Music (2019)

== Awards and nominations ==
Sources: Playbill BroadwayWorld

Year	Award	Category	Title	Result	Ref.
2001	Grammy Award	Best Spoken Word Album	The Complete Shakespeare Sonnets	Nominated	
1998	Tony Award	Best Actor in a Musical	Ragtime	Nominated	
2000	Tony Award	Best Actor in a Musical	Kiss Me, Kate	Won	
2001	Tony Award	Best Actor in a Play	King Hedley II	Nominated	
2003	Tony Award	Best Actor in a Musical	Man of La Mancha	Nominated	
2016	Tony Award	Isabelle Stevenson Award	—N/a	Won	
1998	Drama Desk Award	Outstanding Actor in a Musical	Ragtime	Nominated	
2000	Drama Desk Award	Outstanding Actor in a Musical	Kiss Me, Kate	Won	
2001	Drama Desk Award	Outstanding Actor in a Play	King Hedley II	Nominated	
2003	Drama Desk Award	Outstanding Actor in a Musical	Man of La Mancha	Nominated	
2011	Drama Desk Award	Outstanding Featured Actor in a Musical	Women on the Verge of a Nervous Breakdown	Nominated	
1998	Outer Critics Circle Awards	Outstanding Actor in a Musical	Ragtime	Nominated	
2000	Outer Critics Circle Awards	Outstanding Actor in a Musical	Kiss Me, Kate	Won	
2001	Outer Critics Circle Awards	Outstanding Actor in a Play	King Hedley II	Nominated	
2003	Outer Critics Circle Awards	Outstanding Actor in a Musical	Man of La Mancha	Nominated	
1988	Theatre World Award	—N/a	Mail	Won	
2023	Theatre World Award	Lifetime Achievement in the Theatre	—N/a	Won	
1998	Drama League Award	Distinguished Performance	Ragtime	Won	
2002	Helen Hayes Awards	Outstanding Lead Actor, Non-Resident Production	King Hedley II	Nominated	
2003	Helen Hayes Awards	Outstanding Lead Actor, Non-Resident Production	Man of La Mancha	Won	
2003	Helen Hayes Awards	Outstanding Lead Actor, Resident Musical	Sweeney Todd	Nominated	

== Honors ==
- 2004 – Mitchell was elected the Chairman of the Board of the Actors Fund of America
- 2016 – Mitchell received the Isabelle Stevenson Award "for his commitment to supporting members of the entertainment community in crisis or transition through his work with The Actors Fund."
- 2016 – Mitchell was inducted into the American Theatre Hall of Fame
