= Tabernacle Choir =

LDS choir in Salt Lake City, Utah, US

The Tabernacle Choir at Temple Square
- Choir
- Origin: Salt Lake City, Utah, U.S.
- Founded: August 22, 1847; 179 years ago
- Genre: Worship, classical, religious, gospel
- Members: 360
- Music director: Mack Wilberg
- Affiliation: The Church of Jesus Christ of Latter-day Saints
- Associated groups: Orchestra at Temple Square, Temple Square Chorale, Bells at Temple Square
- Awards: National Medal of Arts; American Classical Music Hall of Fame; NAB Broadcasting Hall of Fame; 1x Grammy Award; 2x Peabody Awards; 3x Emmy Awards
- Website: www.thetabernaclechoir.org

The Tabernacle Choir and West Point Band performing "Battle Hymn of the Republic"

"Come, Come Ye Saints"
Text written by William Clayton in 1846. Performed by The Tabernacle Choir at Temple Square and Orchestra at Temple Square in 2008.

"I Believe in Christ"
Text written by Bruce R. McConkie in 1972 with music written by John Longhurst in 1985. Performed by The Tabernacle Choir at Temple Square and Orchestra at Temple Square in 2007. [Note also in 2008]

"Sunrise, Sunset"
From "Fiddler on the Roof". Written in 1964 with music by Jerry Bock and text by Sheldon Harnick. Performed by The Tabernacle Choir at Temple Square and Orchestra at Temple Square in 2007.

The Tabernacle Choir at Temple Square, formerly known as the Mormon Tabernacle Choir, is an American choir affiliated with the Church of Jesus Christ of Latter-day Saints (LDS Church). It has performed in the Salt Lake Tabernacle for over 100 years. Its weekly devotional program, Music & the Spoken Word, is one of the longest-running radio programs in the world, having aired on radio every week since July 15, 1929, and on television every week since October 1949.

The choir was founded on August 22, 1847, shortly after the Mormon pioneers entered the Salt Lake Valley. Prospective singers must be LDS Church members who are eligible for a temple recommend, be between 25 and 55 years of age at the start of choir service, and live within 100 miles (160 km) of Temple Square.

The Tabernacle Choir is one of the most famous choirs in the world. It first performed for a U.S. president in 1911, and has performed at the inaugurations of presidents Lyndon B. Johnson (1965), Richard Nixon (1969), Ronald Reagan (1981), George H. W. Bush (1989), George W. Bush (2001), and Donald Trump (2017).

== History ==
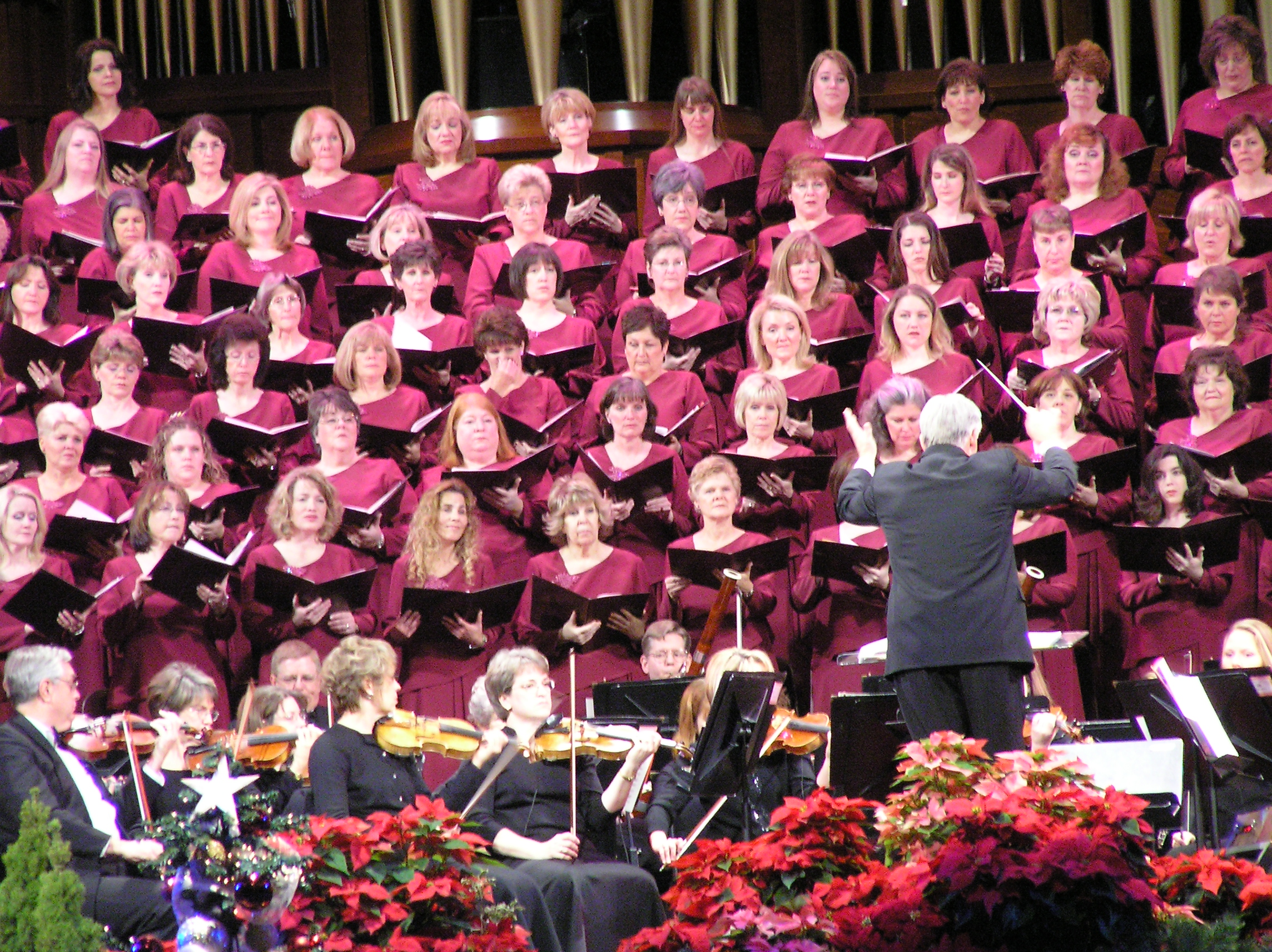
The Tabernacle Choir and Orchestra at Temple Square performing on December 3, 2005, in the LDS Conference Center under the direction of Craig Jessop

"I Am a Child of God"
Music and text written by Naomi Ward Randall in 1957. Performed by The Tabernacle Choir at Temple Square and Orchestra at Temple Square in 2005.

The Tabernacle was completed in October 1867 and the choir held its first concert there on July 4, 1873.

The choir started out fairly small and rather undisciplined. On April 6, 1869, George Careless was appointed as the choir's conductor and the Tabernacle Choir began to improve musically. Under Careless, the first large choir was assembled by adding smaller choral groups to the main Salt Lake Choir. This larger choir, just over 300, sang at the church's October 6–8, 1873 general conference. It was at this point that the choir began to match the size of the spacious Tabernacle. On September 1, 1910, the choir sang the song "Let the Mountains shout for Joy" as their first ever recording. Three hundred of the 600 members showed up for the recording.

Since July 15, 1929, the choir has performed a weekly radio broadcast, Music & the Spoken Word, which is one of the longer-running continuous radio network broadcasts in the world.

Later directors brought more solid vocal training and worked to raise the standards of the choir. The choir also began improving as an ensemble and increased its repertoire from around one hundred songs to nearly a thousand. On July 15, 1929, the choir performed its first radio broadcast of Music & the Spoken Word. By 1950, the Tabernacle Choir at Temple Square performed numerous concerts each year and had released its first long-playing recording. During the 1950s, the choir made its first tour of Europe and earned a Grammy Award for its recording of the "Battle Hymn of the Republic."

At the end of the choir's 4,165th live broadcast on July 12, 2009, the show's host, Lloyd D. Newell, announced another milestone that the show had hit: the completion of its 80th year in existence. The show has been televised since the early 1960s and is now broadcast worldwide through approximately 1,500 radio and television stations.

On October 5, 2018, the choir retired the name "The Mormon Tabernacle Choir" and adopted the name "The Tabernacle Choir at Temple Square" in order to align with the direction of LDS Church leadership regarding the use of terms "Mormon" and "LDS" in referencing church members. The new name retains the reference to the historic Salt Lake Tabernacle, which has been the choir's home for over 150 years, and its location on Temple Square in Salt Lake City, Utah.

Several award-winning popular artists have reflected on the beauty of the choir's music publicly, including Bryn Terfel, Gladys Knight (of Gladys Knight & the Pips), Sting (of The Police), James Taylor, Ric Ocasek (of The Cars), and The Osmonds.

== Milestones ==
Since its establishment, the Tabernacle Choir at Temple Square has performed and recorded extensively, both in the United States (where U.S. President Ronald Reagan called it "America's Choir") and around the world. The following are some of its key points:

- Visited twenty-eight countries outside the United States.
- Performed at thirteen World's Fairs and Expositions.
- Released more than 130 musical compilations and several films and videotapes.
- Reached more than 100 million YouTube views on its channel (in October 2017).
- "Come, Thou Fount of Every Blessing" became the choir's first video to surpass 10 million YouTube views (in July 2020).

The Tabernacle Choir at Temple Square has performed for ten presidents of the United States beginning with William Howard Taft. The choir has also performed at the inaugurations of United States presidents Lyndon B. Johnson (1965), Richard M. Nixon (1969), Ronald Reagan (1981), George H. W. Bush (1989), George W. Bush (2001), and Donald Trump (2017).

Other notable events the choir has performed at include the following:

- Performed over twenty times at the 2002 Winter Olympics in Salt Lake City, including at the opening ceremony, where they sang the national anthem and the Olympic Hymn under the direction of John Williams.
- The American Bicentennial in Washington, D.C. (July 4, 1976)
- The Constitution's bicentennial celebration at Independence Hall in Philadelphia, Pennsylvania (1987)

It has also participated in several significant events, including:

- National broadcasts honoring the passing of U.S. presidents:
  - Franklin D. Roosevelt (April 12, 1945)
  - John F. Kennedy (November 24, 1963)

=== Tours ===
From its first national tour in 1893, under the direction of Evan Stephens, to the Chicago World's Fair, the choir has performed in locations around the world, including:

- Los Angeles (1926) Hollywood Bowl.
- Chicago (1934) Century of Progress Exposition.
- San Diego (1935) California Pacific International Exposition.
- Western Europe (August 19 – September 17, 1955) Glasgow, Manchester, Cardiff, Prince Albert Hall in London, Amsterdam, Scheveningen, Copenhagen, West Berlin, Wiesbaden, Bern, Palais de Chaillot in Paris. Also sang at the dedication of the Bern Switzerland Temple on 11 September 1955 on this tour.
- Central America (1968, 1972)
- Western Europe (1973, 1998)
- Western Europe (June 5–21, 1982) Bergen International Festival in Bergen, Oslo, Stockholm, Helsinki, Copenhagen, Aalborg, Rotterdam, Royal Albert Hall in London.
- Central Europe and the former Soviet Union (June 8–29, 1991) Frankfurt, Strasbourg, Zürich, Vienna, Budapest, Prague, Dresden, Berlin, Warsaw, Moscow, Leningrad.
- Israel (December 26, 1992 – January 6, 1993) Haifa, Jerusalem, Tel Aviv.
- Japan/Korea (September 8–13, 1979) Festival Hall in Osaka, Kaikan Hall in Kyoto, Fumon-kan Hall in Tokyo, Seoul National Theater in Seoul.
- Japan/Korea (1982)
- Brazil (May 24–30, 1981) "Week of Music of the Americas" and Ibirapuera Auditorium in São Paulo.
- South Pacific (June 14 – July 5, 1988) Laie, Honolulu, Auckland, Christchurch, Wellington, Adelaide, Brisbane, Melbourne, Perth, Sydney.
- Eastern United States (2003) Interlochen, Wolftrap, Saratoga, Lincoln Center, Tanglewood.
- Canada and Eastern United States (June 20–27, 2011) Chautauqua, New York City, Norfolk, Philadelphia, Toronto, Washington, D.C.
- Western United States (2012)
- Midwest United States (June 12–20, 2013) Chicago, Columbus, Indianapolis, Madison, Milwaukee, Minneapolis.
- Eastern United States (June 24 – July 7, 2015) Bethel Woods, Bethesda, Boston, New York City, Saratoga Springs.
- Western Europe (June 27 – July 16, 2016) Brussels, Berlin, Frankfurt, Nuremberg, Rotterdam, Vienna, Zürich.
- U.S. West Coast (June 19 – July 2, 2018) Costa Meta, Los Angeles, Berkeley, Mountain View, Rohnert Park, Vancouver, Seattle.
- In the Philippines (February 20-29, 2024) - The choir, with 400 singers and orchestra members, for the second stop of its world tour, performed for the first time in the Philippines during the interfaith concert with Leaders, including Cardinal Jose Advincula at the University of Santo Tomas. The choir also performed at Makati Shangri-La, Manila and SM Mall of Asia where Lea Salonga will perform as guest artist. It also visited the Manila American Cemetery to honor the fallen US soldiers.
- To Lima, Peru (February 18-23, 2025) - The choir and orchestra at Temple Square performed in the Estadio Nacional de Lima as its inaugural visit to Peru and a continuation of its Latin-American legacy tour "Canciones de Esperanza" ("Songs of Hope"). The 50,068 seat venue was filled to capacity and many attendees visited from neighboring countries like Bolivia, Ecuador, and Colombia. The choir was joined by renowned artists like Mauricio Mesones, Fonseca, Los Kjarkas, The Fabre Family, as well as emcee performers Adassa and Alex Melecio. The concert was broadcast live to "watch parties" in other countries, and an estimated 70,000 viewers participated live. The choir was accompanied by Elder Ulisses Soares, a member of the Quorum of the Twelve Apostles.

=== Multi-year global ministry tour ===
A "heritage tour," which would have taken the choir to various European venues, had been planned for 2021, but was postponed to 2022, before subsequently being canceled. In 2023, the choir announced it would embark on a multi-year, multi-stop global ministry tour. The first stop took the choir to Mexico City, Mexico for six days, where they performed multiple concerts, engaged in service projects, and recorded a music video. In late 2023, the choir announced that the next stop in their tour would be the Philippines in 2024.

=== Christmas concerts ===
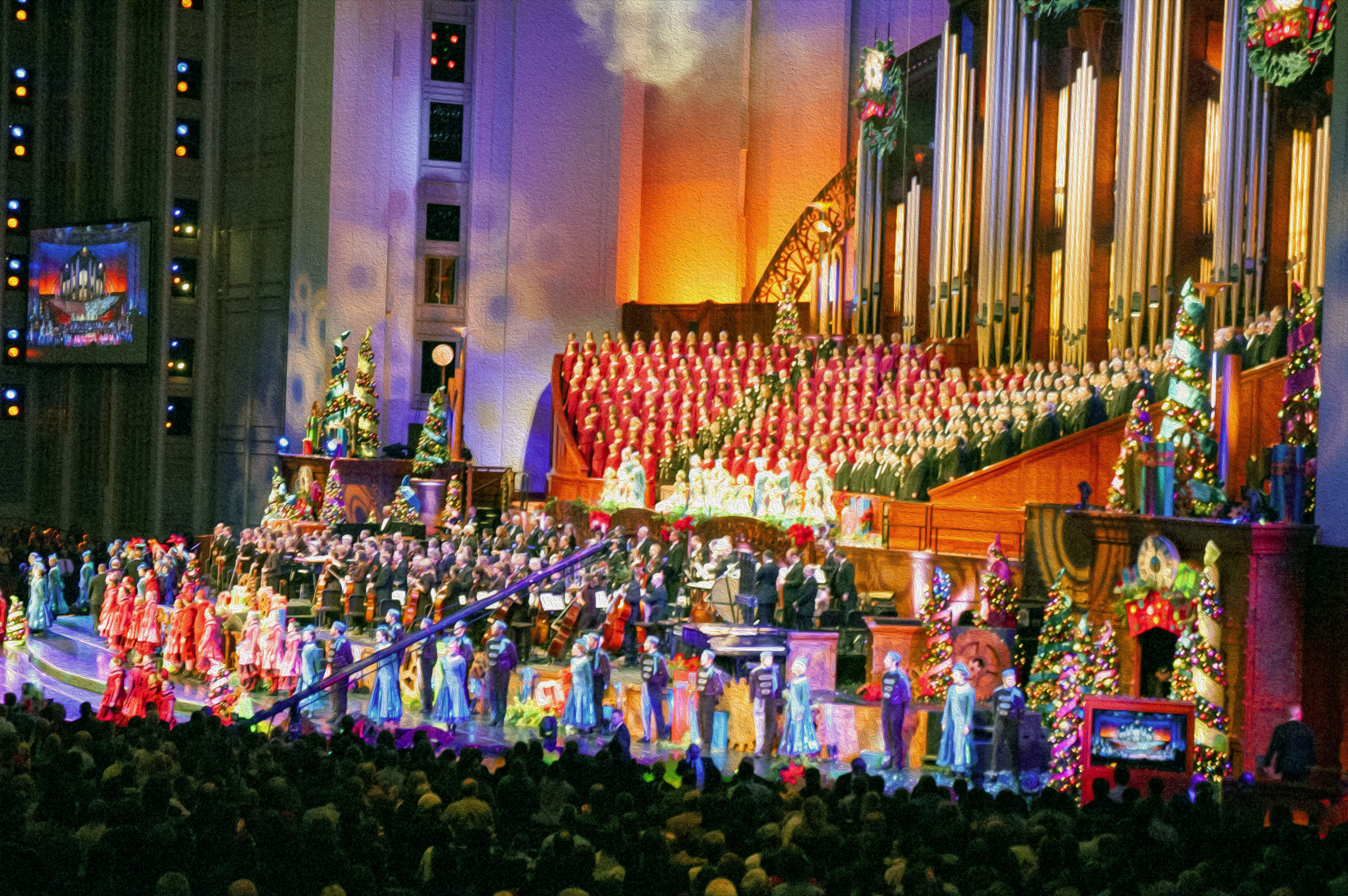
Tabernacle Choir at Temple Square performing in the Conference Center in 2014

"Angels We Have Heard on High"
Performed by the Tabernacle Choir at Temple Square in 1997.

The choir performs an annual Christmas concert in the Conference Center in Salt Lake City during the month of December. Typically, the concert series consists of a Wednesday dress rehearsal, Saturday afternoon recording session and three performances on Thursday, Friday and Saturday evenings followed with a shortened version of the concert on Sunday morning in the weekly Music and the Spoken Word broadcast. The combined audience for each concert series is approximately 63,000. Tickets to the concert are free, and are available on a first-come, first-served basis. A live album (CD/DVD) is typically released, along with the concert being aired on PBS and BYUtv, during December of the following year. The concert traditionally concludes with a performance of "Angels, from the Realms of Glory".

Guest artists participate and sing with the choir most years. A guest narrator is also invited most years to read the Christmas story from the Book of Luke. Past guest artists have included:

- 2000: R&B singer Gladys Knight and actress Roma Downey
- 2001: Actress Angela Lansbury
- 2002: News anchor Walter Cronkite
- 2003: Mezzo-soprano Frederica von Stade and baritone Bryn Terfel
- 2004: Broadway actress Audra McDonald and actor Peter Graves
- 2005: Soprano Renée Fleming and actress Claire Bloom
- 2006: Soprano Sissel Kyrkjebø
- 2007: A cappella group the King's Singers
- 2008: Broadway singer Brian Stokes Mitchell and actor Edward Herrmann
- 2009: Jazz singer Natalie Cole and historian David McCullough
- 2010: Pop singer David Archuleta and actor Michael York
- 2011: Operatic baritone Nathan Gunn and actress Jane Seymour
- 2012: Tenor Alfie Boe and news anchor Tom Brokaw The event also featured Col. Gail "Hal" Halvorsen.
- 2013: Soprano Deborah Voigt and actor John Rhys-Davies
- 2014: Broadway actor Santino Fontana and The Sesame Street Muppets
- 2015: Broadway actress Laura Osnes, actor Martin Jarvis, and four Metropolitan Opera soloists.
- 2016: Tenor Rolando Villazón
- 2017: Actress Sutton Foster and actor Hugh Bonneville
- 2018: Actress and coloratura soprano Kristin Chenoweth
- 2019: Broadway actress Kelli O'Hara and actor Richard Thomas
- 2020: No concert (owing to COVID-19 pandemic)
- 2021: Broadway actress and soprano Megan Hilty and actor Neal McDonough
- 2022: Broadway actress Lea Salonga and actor David Suchet
- 2023: Broadway actor Michael Maliakel and actress Lesley Nicol
- 2024: Broadway actress Ruthie Ann Miles and actor Dennis Haysbert
- 2025: Broadway actress Stephanie J. Block and her husband, actor Sebastian Arcelus

=== Pioneer Day / Summer concerts ===
From 2011 to 2023, the choir held a yearly summer concert in mid-late July as part of Utah's Pioneer Day celebrations. Unlike the Christmas concerts, there were typically only two shows: one on Friday and the other on the following Saturday. The tickets were available on a first-come, first-served basis.

Guest artists were typically invited every year. Each year's guest artist(s) are as follows:

- 2011: Brian Stokes Mitchell and Linda Eder
- 2012: Katherine Jenkins
- 2013: Nathan Pacheco and Lindsey Stirling
- 2014: Santino Fontana and Sylvia McNair
- 2015: Laura Osnes
- 2016: King's Singers
- 2017: Alex Boyé
- 2018: Matthew Morrison and Laura Michelle Kelly
- 2019: Sissel Kyrkjebø
- 2020: No concert (owing to COVID-19 pandemic)
- 2021: No concert (owing to COVID-19 pandemic)
- 2022: "Love one Another" concert, featuring baritone Shea Owens
- 2023: Adassa and Alex Melecio
- 2024: No concert
- 2025: No concert
- 2026: Donny Osmond, David Foster, Katharine McPhee, Stephanie J. Block, Sebastian Arcelus, and The Bonner Family at The Hollywood Bowl

== Leadership ==
The Tabernacle Choir at Temple Square has about fifteen staff members including a president, directors, organists, a Music and the Spoken Word announcer, and two business-related staff members.

=== Music directors ===
Mack Wilberg is the current director, with associate director Ryan Murphy. Wilberg was appointed as director in March 2008, and Murphy was appointed to replace Wilberg in his former position as associate director in March 2009.

=== Organists ===
Richard Elliott, Andrew Unsworth, Linda Margetts, Brian Mathias, and Joseph Peeples are the current organists.

=== Music & the Spoken Word announcers ===
Since its inception in 1929, the "spoken word" segment of the program has been voiced by five separate individuals. The original writer, producer, and announcer of the spoken portion of the broadcast was Edward (Ted) Kimball, who would stand at the top of a tall ladder and announce the name of each performance piece into the microphone suspended from the Tabernacle ceiling. Kimball remained at the post for only 11 months, when he was replaced by Richard L. Evans, who continued in that capacity until his death in 1971. J. Spencer Kinard took over as announcer in 1972 until he stepped down in 1990. Lloyd D. Newell served as the announcer until mid-June 2024, and he was succeeded by Derrick Porter.

== Awards and inductions ==
The choir has received numerous awards, including the National Medal of Arts (2003), a Grammy Award for Best Performance by a Vocal Group or Chorus (1960), and four Emmy Awards (1987, 2013, 2014). The choir is also an inductee to the American Classical Music Hall of Fame (2015) and the National Association of Broadcasters Broadcasting Hall of Fame (2004). The 320-person choir is the largest act to chart on the Billboard Hot 100—their version of "The Battle Hymn of the Republic" reached No. 13 in 1959.

1944

- Peabody Award — Music and the Spoken Word for Outstanding Entertainment in Music

1961

- Peabody Award — Music and the Spoken Word — "Let Freedom Ring"

1981

- Freedoms Foundation's George Washington Award — Music and the Spoken Word — Fourth of July Broadcast

1988

- Freedoms Foundation's George Washington Award

2003

- International Radio and Television Society Foundation's Special Recognition Award
- Chorus America's Margaret Hillis Award for Choral Excellence

2004

- Library of Congress' National Recording Registry — Handel's Messiah (1959)

2006

- Mother Teresa Award

2010

- National Radio Hall of Fame — Music and the Spoken Word

== Recordings ==
Since its first recording in 1910, the choir has earned five gold albums (two in 1963: The Lord's Prayer and Handel's Messiah; one in 1979: The Joy of Christmas; and two in 1985: The Mormon Tabernacle Choir Sings Christmas Carols and Joy to the World) and two platinum albums (in 1991, Hallmark Christmas: Carols of Christmas and in 1992, Hallmark Christmas: Celebrate Christmas!). The choir has made over 200 recordings and continues to produce albums. For some live performances and albums, the choir has collaborated with large orchestras such as the New York Philharmonic, the Philadelphia Orchestra, the Royal Philharmonic Orchestra of London, the Boston Pops Orchestra, and the Orchestra at Temple Square. The choir's own record label was formed in 2003.

=== Chart-topping albums ===
Title	Details	Peak chart positions			
Title	Details	US Classical	US Classical Crossover	US Traditional Classical	US Christian
America's Choir: Favorite Songs, Hymns, & Anthems	Released: 2004; Label: Intellectual Reserve; Format: Digital download, CD	5	—	1	42
Choose Something Like a Star	Released: 2005; Label: Intellectual Reserve; Format: Digital download, CD	7	—	1	—
Spirit of the Season	Released: 2007; Label: Intellectual Reserve; Format: Digital download, CD	5	—	1	11
Come Thou Fount of Every Blessing: American Folk Hymns & Spirituals	Released: 2009; Label: Intellectual Reserve; Format: Digital download, CD	1	1	—	8
Heavensong: Music of Contemplation and Light	Released: 2010; Label: Intellectual Reserve; Format: Digital download, CD	2	1	—	15
Men of the Mormon Tabernacle Choir	Released: 2010; Label: Intellectual Reserve; Format: Digital download, CD	1	—	1	9
100 Years: Celebrating a Century of Recording Excellence	Released: 2010; Label: Intellectual Reserve; Format: Digital download, CD	1	—	—	6
This Is the Christ	Released: 2011; Label: Intellectual Reserve; Format: Digital download, CD	2	—	1	1
GLORY! Music of Rejoicing	Released: 2012; Label: Intellectual Reserve; Format: Digital download, CD	5	—	1	11
He Is Risen (EP)	Released: 2014; Label: Intellectual Reserve; Format: Digital download, CD	1	—	1	19
George Frideric Handel: Messiah	Released: 2016; Label: Intellectual Reserve; Format: Digital download, CD	3	—	1	34
Mormon Tabernacle Choir & Friends	Released: 2017; Label: Intellectual Reserve; Format: Digital download, CD	2	1	—	21
Let Us All Press On: Hymns of Praise and Inspiration	Released: 2019; Label: Intellectual Reserve; Format: Digital download, CD	3	—	1	40
When You Believe: A Night at the Movies (EP)	Released: 2020; Label: Intellectual Reserve; Format: Digital download, CD	11	1	—	—

=== Filmography ===
- This Is Cinerama (1952)
- Mr. Krueger's Christmas (1980), starring James Stewart
- Nora's Christmas Gift (1989)
- Singing with Angels (2016)

== See also ==
- Orchestra at Temple Square
- Bells at Temple Square
