= Orchestra at Temple Square =

American orchestra

Tabernacle Choir at Temple Square and Orchestra at Temple Square in the LDS Conference Center
- Orchestra
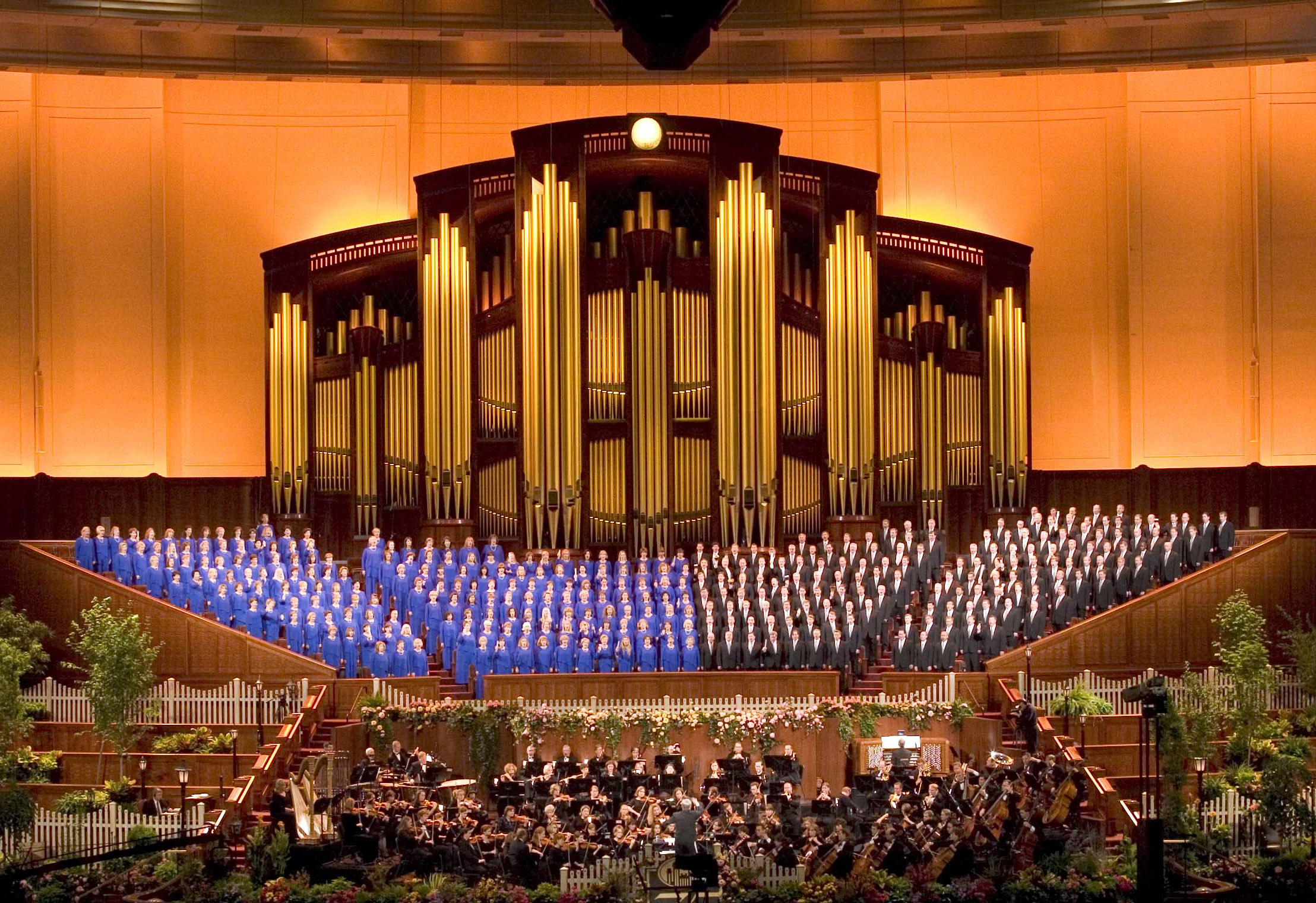
- Founded: 1999
- Location: Salt Lake City, Utah, USA
- Concert hall: Salt Lake Tabernacle, Temple Square
- Principal conductor: Igor Gruppman
- Website: http://www.thetabernaclechoir.org/

The Orchestra at Temple Square (Orchestra) is a 110-member orchestra based in Salt Lake City, Utah. The orchestra was created in 1999 under the direction of Gordon B. Hinckley, then the president of the Church of Jesus Christ of Latter-day Saints (LDS Church), as part of an initiative to continually strengthen and expand the capabilities of the church's music organizations.

== History ==
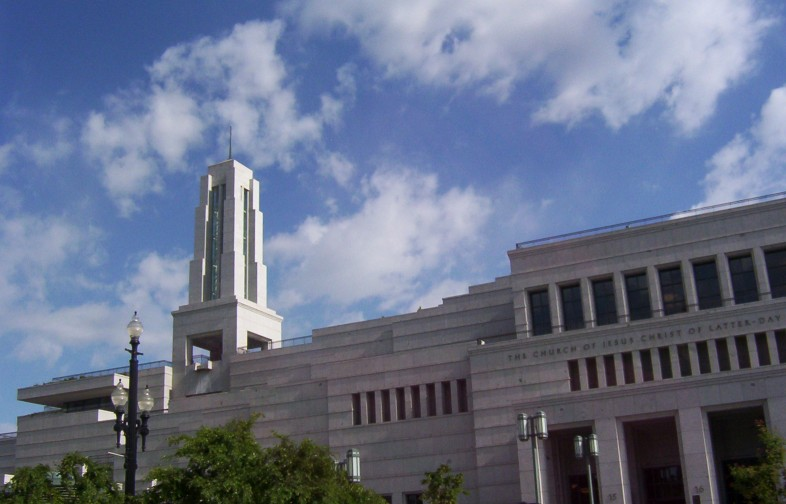
The LDS Conference Center, primary concert hall of the Orchestra at Temple Square during renovation of the Salt Lake Tabernacle.

Formed in 1999, the orchestra fulfilled the desire of LDS Church leaders of having a permanent orchestra both to enhance the quality of the Tabernacle Choir at Temple Square (Choir) performances and to involve instrumental musicians in church music projects on the same volunteer basis as Tabernacle Choir members. While some initial recording contracts in the first years of the orchestra's existence were paid, with the creation of the Tabernacle Choir's own recording label the 110-member Orchestra has evolved into a purely volunteer organization. Although many orchestra members are professional musicians, in order to participate they are required to give their time and talents to the orchestra without financial compensation.

Like the Tabernacle Choir, the orchestra makes its home in the Salt Lake Tabernacle on Temple Square in Salt Lake City. During structural renovations to the tabernacle, the orchestra rehearsed and performed in the adjacent LDS Conference Center, as did the choir.

The orchestra was initially directed by former Tabernacle Choir associate director (and current creative director of Utah Chamber Artists) Barlow Bradford. Under his direction the group developed into a critically acclaimed symphony orchestra. Bradford unexpectedly resigned shortly after the 2002 Winter Olympics. The orchestra continued under the musical supervision of Tabernacle Choir director Craig Jessop, until his abrupt resignation on March 4, 2008. Under his direction, the orchestra increased its role as accompanist to the Tabernacle Choir and Temple Square Chorale, but continued to perform on its own under the baton of Igor Gruppman, concertmaster of the Rotterdam Philharmonic Orchestra. Gruppman was the orchestra's concertmaster at the inaugural concert in 1999 and was named conductor of the orchestra in 2003.

== Repertoire and performances ==
The orchestra performs masterworks from the standard symphony orchestra repertoire several times a year, both at home and on tour, under the direction of the Ukrainian-born Gruppman.

The orchestra also regularly appears in the Tabernacle Choir's weekly radio and TV broadcasts of Music & the Spoken Word, the Choir's acclaimed Christmas specials on PBS, and in the Choir's recording projects, including several on the Telarc label. More recent recordings on the Choir's own label have enjoyed tremendous success, appearing prominently on Billboard's classical and classical crossover charts. Additionally, the orchestra accompanies the Temple Square Chorale in its semiannual concerts and has provided the music for various LDS Church stage productions such as the annual Christmas favorite Savior of the World.

== Guest artists ==
The orchestra featured pianist George Li and organist Clay Christiansen at its fifteenth-anniversary celebration concert.

== See also ==
- The Tabernacle Choir at Temple Square
- Bells at Temple Square
