= Mack Wilberg =

American music director (born 1955)

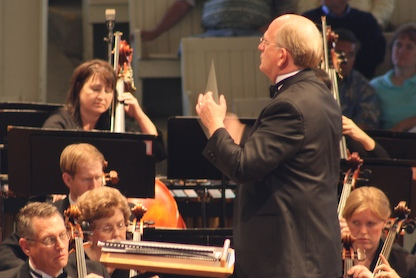
- Mack Wilberg conducting on June 22, 2007
- Born: February 20, 1955 (age 71); Price, Utah, U.S.
- Education: Brigham Young University (BM); University of Southern California (MM, DMus)
- Occupations: Composer, arranger, conductor, music director

Mack J. Wilberg (born February 20, 1955) is an American composer, arranger, pianist, conductor, and choral clinician who has been the music director of the Tabernacle Choir at Temple Square (formerly known as the Mormon Tabernacle Choir) since 2008. He was a professor of music at Brigham Young University (BYU) from 1984 to 1999.

== Early life and education ==
Wilberg was born on February 20, 1955, in Price, Utah, and grew up in the nearby town of Castle Dale. Wilberg learned how to play the piano at the age of four. He served as a missionary for the Church of Jesus Christ of Latter-day Saints (LDS Church) in South Korea where he was part of New Horizons, a vocal group made up of LDS missionaries.

Wilberg attended BYU after finishing his missionary service, graduating in 1979 with a Bachelor of Music degree in piano performance and composition. He then did graduate study in choral music at the University of Southern California's Thornton School of Music, earning both master of music and doctor of musical arts degrees, with a doctoral dissertation researching works written for chorus and piano.

== Career ==
Wilberg began his career at BYU as a professor of music. Wilberg was a professor of music at BYU from 1984 to 1999, where he directed the Men's Chorus and Concert Choir. At BYU, he was a member of the American Piano Quartet, which toured internationally and commissioned many original works, with Wilberg creating many of its arrangements himself.

He was the associate director of the Tabernacle Choir and music director of the Chorale at Temple Square from May 1999 until his appointment as the Choir's director on March 28, 2008. Wilberg is a noted composer and arranger, and his works are published by Oxford University Press, including his major work, Requiem. His arrangements have been performed at the funerals for United States presidents Gerald Ford, Jimmy Carter, Ronald Reagan, and George H. W. Bush.

Wilberg's numerous choral compositions and arrangements are performed and recorded by choral organizations throughout the world. For many of the works he has written/arranged for the Choir, public performances have involved guests artists invited by the Choir, including Renée Fleming, Frederica von Stade, Bryn Terfel, the King’s Singers, Audra McDonald, David Archuleta, Natalie Cole, Brian Stokes Mitchell, Kristin Chenoweth, Madeleine Albright, Walter Cronkite, and Claire Bloom. In 2006, he was awarded the Brock Commission from the American Choral Directors Association.

Wilberg plans and conducts a weekly performance of Music & the Spoken Word.

== Family ==
Wilberg's father was part owner of the family's coal mine but was killed in a 1964 mining accident, well before the 1984 fire. Wilberg and his wife, Rebecca, are the parents of four children. Rebecca also works with Wilberg as a vocal coach and is a member of the choir school faculty of the Tabernacle Choir.
