= LDS Conference Center =

LDS General Conference Meetingplace

Coordinates: 40°46′21″N 111°53′33″W

The Church of Jesus Christ of Latter-day Saints Conference Center
- Conference Center
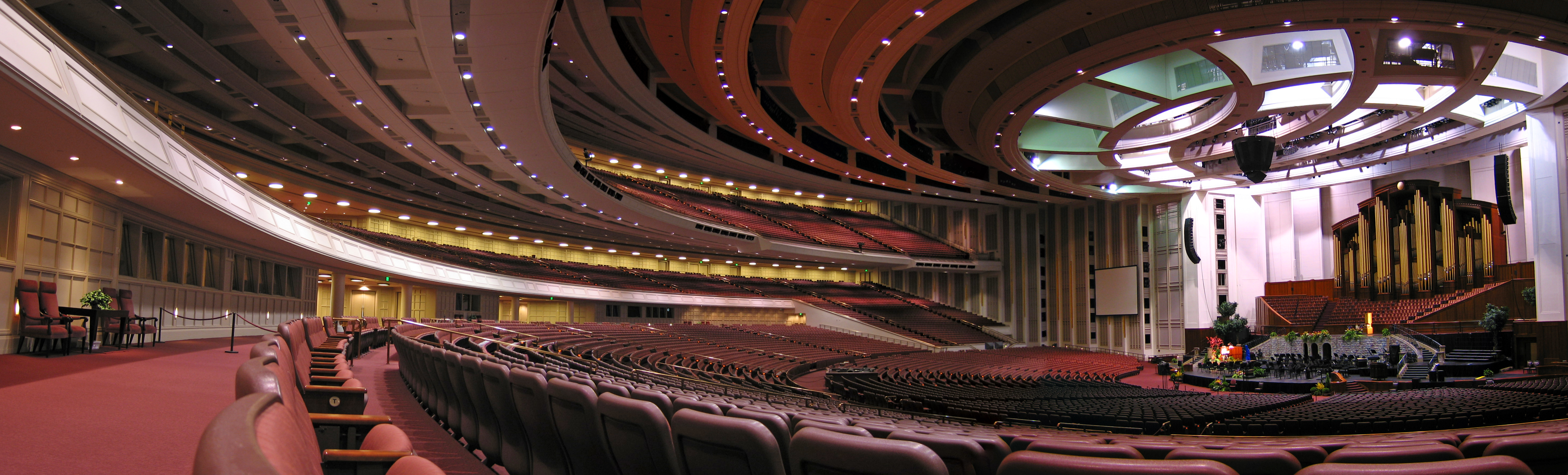
- Conference Center interior looking towards the rostrum and organ.
- Interactive map of The Church of Jesus Christ of Latter-day Saints Conference Center
- Location: 60 W. North Temple; Salt Lake City, Utah
- Owner: The Church of Jesus Christ of Latter-day Saints
- Seating type: Reserved by Section
- Capacity: 21,000
- Type: Theater
- Public transit: Temple Square Trax Station

Construction
- Groundbreaking: 24 July 1997
- Opened: April 1, 2000; October 8, 2000 (building dedication)
- Architect: ZGF Architects LLP

Website
- Conference Center

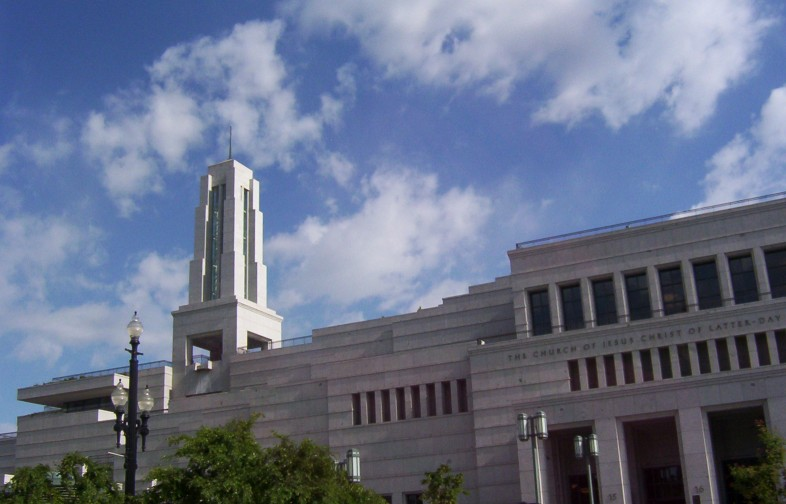
View of Conference Center spire taken from the south, from North Temple St., Salt Lake City, Utah.

The Conference Center, in Salt Lake City, Utah, is the premier meeting hall for the Church of Jesus Christ of Latter-day Saints (LDS Church). Completed in 2000, the 21,000-seat Conference Center replaced the traditional use of the nearby Salt Lake Tabernacle, built in 1868, for the church's twice-yearly general conference and other major gatherings, devotionals, and events.

== Features ==
The 1,400,000-square-foot (130,000 m^{2}) Conference Center seats 21,200 people in its main auditorium. This includes the rostrum behind the pulpit facing the audience, which provides seating at general conference for general authorities and general officers of the church and the 360-voice Tabernacle Choir at Temple Square. The auditorium is large enough to hold a Boeing 747 in the space between the seats and the rear of the stage. All seats in the audience have an unobstructed view of the pulpit because the roof is held up by radial trusses. The balcony is supported by a series of 34 cantilevers. This construction method allows the balcony to sink 5/8 inch (16 mm) under full capacity. Behind the podium is a 7,708-pipe and 130-rank Schoenstein pipe organ. Underground is a parking garage that can hold 1,400 cars. A modernist, three-story chandelier hangs in a skylight in the interior of the building. A waterfall descends from the spire. City Creek flows in a rough-hewn riverbed, complementing the Conference Center.

On the third floor of the Conference Center there are busts of current and past church presidents and photographs of church leaders; photographs of female church leaders were added in 2014.

Because the building sits near the base of Salt Lake City's Capitol Hill, the roof is landscaped for attractiveness, an extension of the Gardens at Temple Square. About 3 acres (12,000 m^{2}) of grass and hundreds of trees have been planted on the roof. Twenty-one native grasses were employed to conserve water and showcase local foliage. The rooftop garden includes a central garden of rectangular planters of aspen and conifers with long runnels and basins of water. The landscaping is meant to echo the mountains and meadows of Utah.

=== Conference Center Theater ===
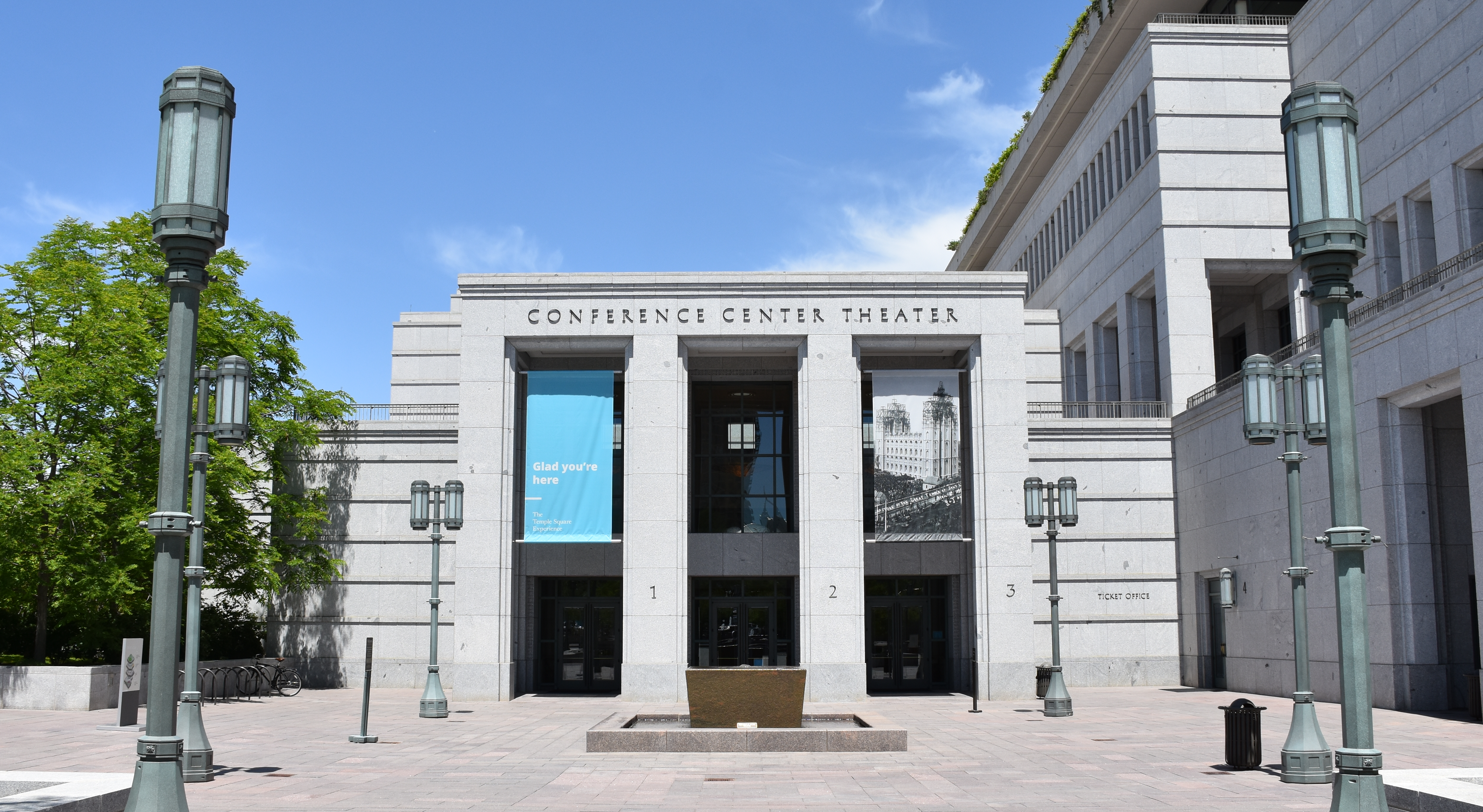
The Conference Center Theater

Attached to the main building on the northwest corner is the 900-seat Conference Center Theater that can be used as a dedicated theater or as an overflow room.

== Planning and construction ==
Plans "for construction at some indefinite date of a 30,000-seat auditorium of the block north of Temple Square" were first announced at the October 1951 General Conference by church president David O. McKay as part of his worldwide building effort. The designs were solicited by church architect Leland A. Gray in the early 1990s, in conjunction with Gordon B. Hinckley who then became church president in 1995. The LDS Church originally sought a 26,000-seat building no more than 75 feet (23 m) high in accord with zoning regulations for the church-owned 10 acres (40,000 m^{2}) block immediately north of Temple Square.

Hinckley publicly announced the project in the April 1996 general conference. The final plans, completed in late 1996, featured 21,200 seats in the main hall, with 905 in the side theater. The design of the Conference Center was accomplished by Portland, Oregon-based Zimmer Gunsul Frasca Partnership. Auerbach & Associates of San Francisco was responsible for theater design and architectural lighting.

Contracting for the building was done by Jacobsen, Layton, and Oakland—three Salt Lake City construction firms. The three companies submitted a joint bid in order to compete with national firms. The companies jointly operated under the name "Legacy Constructors" after winning the contract in late 1996.

Demolition of existing LDS Church properties on the site began May 1997. Deseret Gym—a YMCA-like gymnasium—and the Mormon Handicraft store had to be razed for the project.

Ground was broken July 24, 1997. This date coincided with the 150th anniversary of Mormon pioneers entering the Salt Lake Valley, an event celebrated in Utah as Pioneer Day.

=== Little Cottonwood Canyon controversy ===
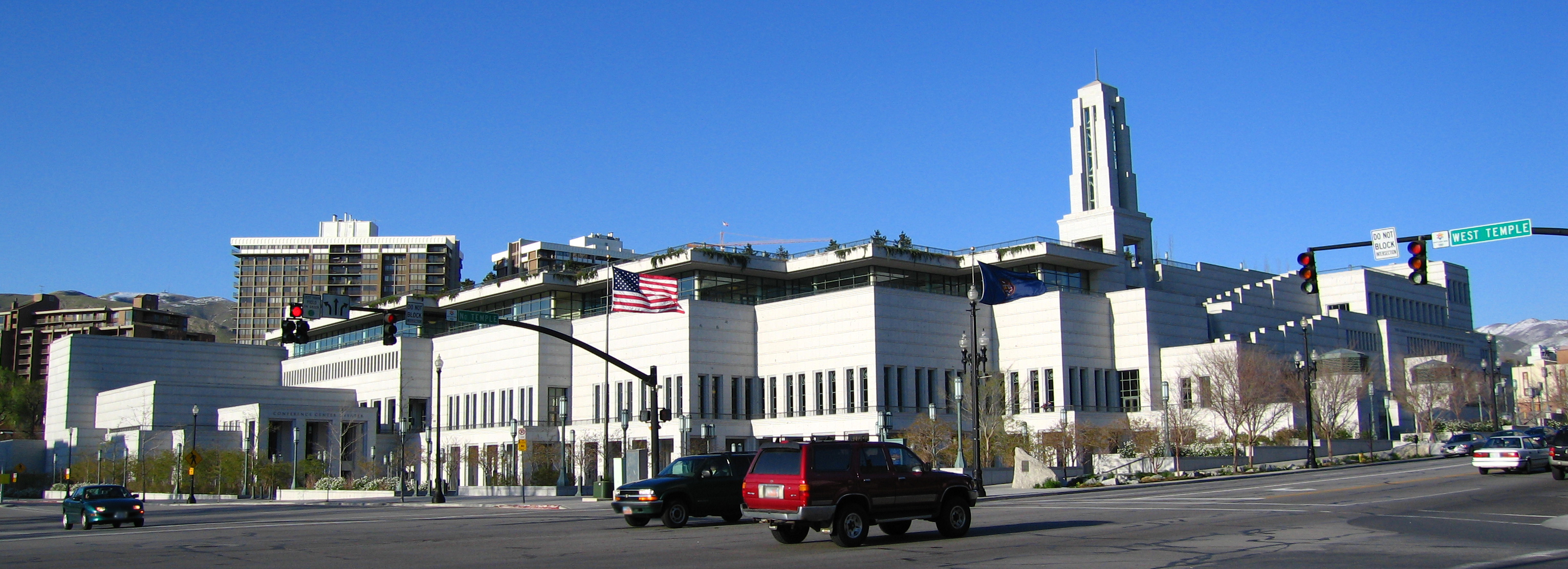
Conference Center from its southwest corner

Although the Conference Center is a modern steel truss and rebar-based design without need for masonry support, the LDS Church sought slabs of quartz monzonite, a form of granite, to clad all exterior walls. Specifically, the church wanted granite to match rock quarried more than a hundred years earlier to build the adjacent Salt Lake Temple. Therefore, the church requested a permit to quarry granite from Little Cottonwood Canyon southeast of Salt Lake City. The Salt Lake County Commission granted a two-year permit on condition that extraction not interfere with the ski season. Critics of the extraction argued that the quarry harmed the environment and burdened residents while endangering drivers through Little Cottonwood Canyon below.

Quarrying began May 28, 1998. The quarry location was further up the canyon from where stone was extracted for the Salt Lake Temple. Although court filings challenged the legality of extracting the granite (specifically attacking Salt Lake County's authority to issue permit), the project was interrupted only by winter weather. The church finished quarrying by November 1999. Over 300,000 square feet (28,000 m^{2}) of granite was extracted. The granite was quarried by Idaho Travertine (now Yellowstone Rock) and subsequently cut into slabs at their Idaho Falls Facility for use as the facade of the building. There was not enough granite extracted from the Little Cottonwood Canyon quarry for the entire project, so extra granite was brought in from the mid-west and used for the flooring.

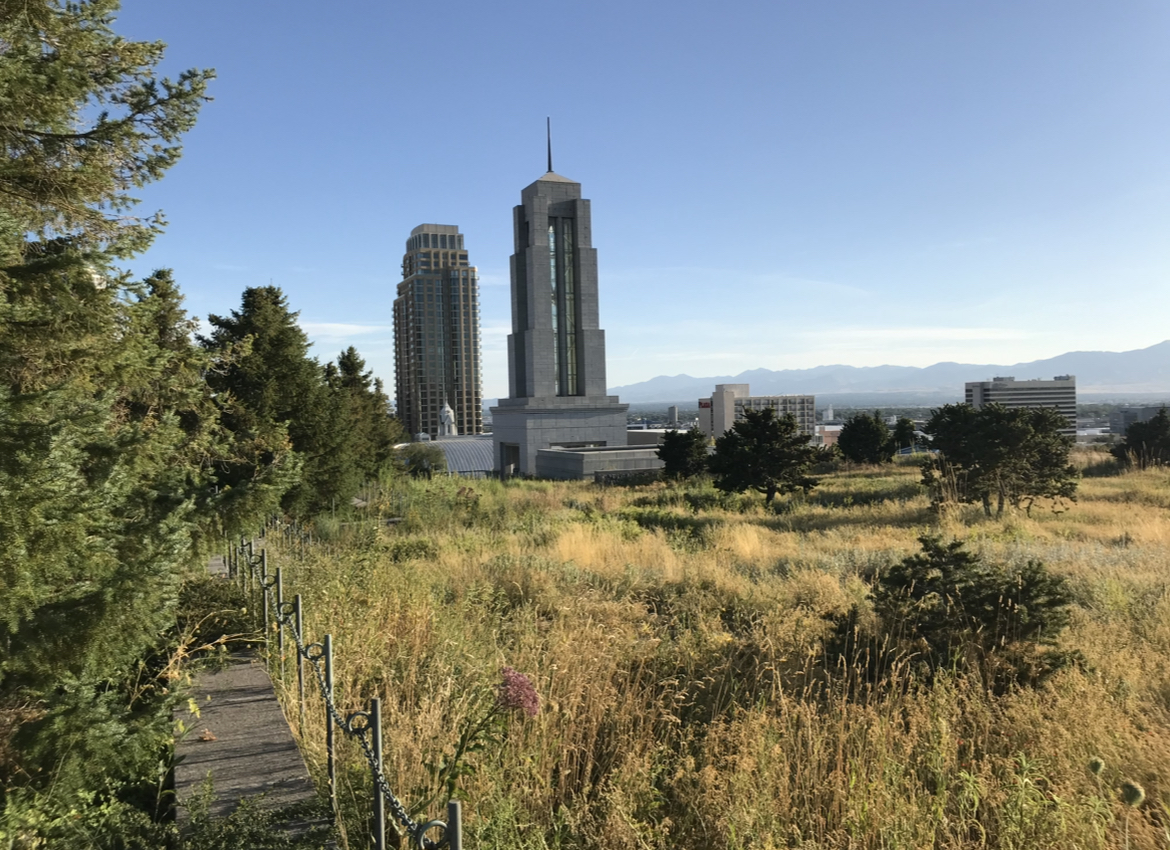
The green roof of the Conference Center

=== Completion ===
The Salt Lake City Tornado hindered construction on August 11, 1999. Construction cranes toppled at the work site, and four injuries to crew were reported.

Construction was complete enough for the building to be used for the 170th annual general conference on April 1 and 2, 2000. The pipe organ was not yet operational, so the Mormon Tabernacle Choir was accompanied by an electric organ amplified through the center's speaker system. Hinckley remarked in his opening address that over 370,000 people had inquired about tickets for the center's inaugural general conference. He also related that a black walnut tree that he had planted decades earlier in his backyard provided wood for the pulpit of the new center.

The Conference Center was completed later in the year and formally dedicated on October 8, during the 170th semiannual general conference. As part of the event, the dedicatory prayer was followed by a "hosanna shout"—a show of gratitude that dates to the early days of the Latter Day Saint movement. The shout involves participants waving white handkerchiefs while repeating "Hosanna, hosanna, hosanna, to God and the Lamb" three times. Though it had been used in public before, such as during the capstone ceremony for the Salt Lake Temple and at the church centennial celebration in 1930, before this public broadcast of the hosanna shout, some assumed it was exclusively related to temple dedications, which are not accessible to non-Latter-day Saints. The Conference Center dedication demonstrated that the hosanna shout, although considered sacred by the Latter-day Saints, is not necessarily used exclusively in temple-related settings.

=== Schoenstein Organ at the Conference Center ===
This organ is internationally significant, both because of its role in accompanying choirs in conferences, and also in that it is one of only a few organs in the world that has registers of pipes extending down into the 64' series, the 64' Contra Trombone and 64' Contra Gamba, which both extend 4 pipes down to GGGGG#, 13 semitones below the lowest note on a standard piano. The tallest pipe used to produce this note is approximately 40 feet (5 stories) tall. This organ also has many other unique features, including full-compass manual 32' reed and flute registers, double expression, and many heroic voices on high pressure. High pressures are used throughout the organ due to the monumental amount of sound needed to project out into an auditorium of this size.
