= Hymns: Church of Jesus Christ of Latter-day Saints (1948/1950) =

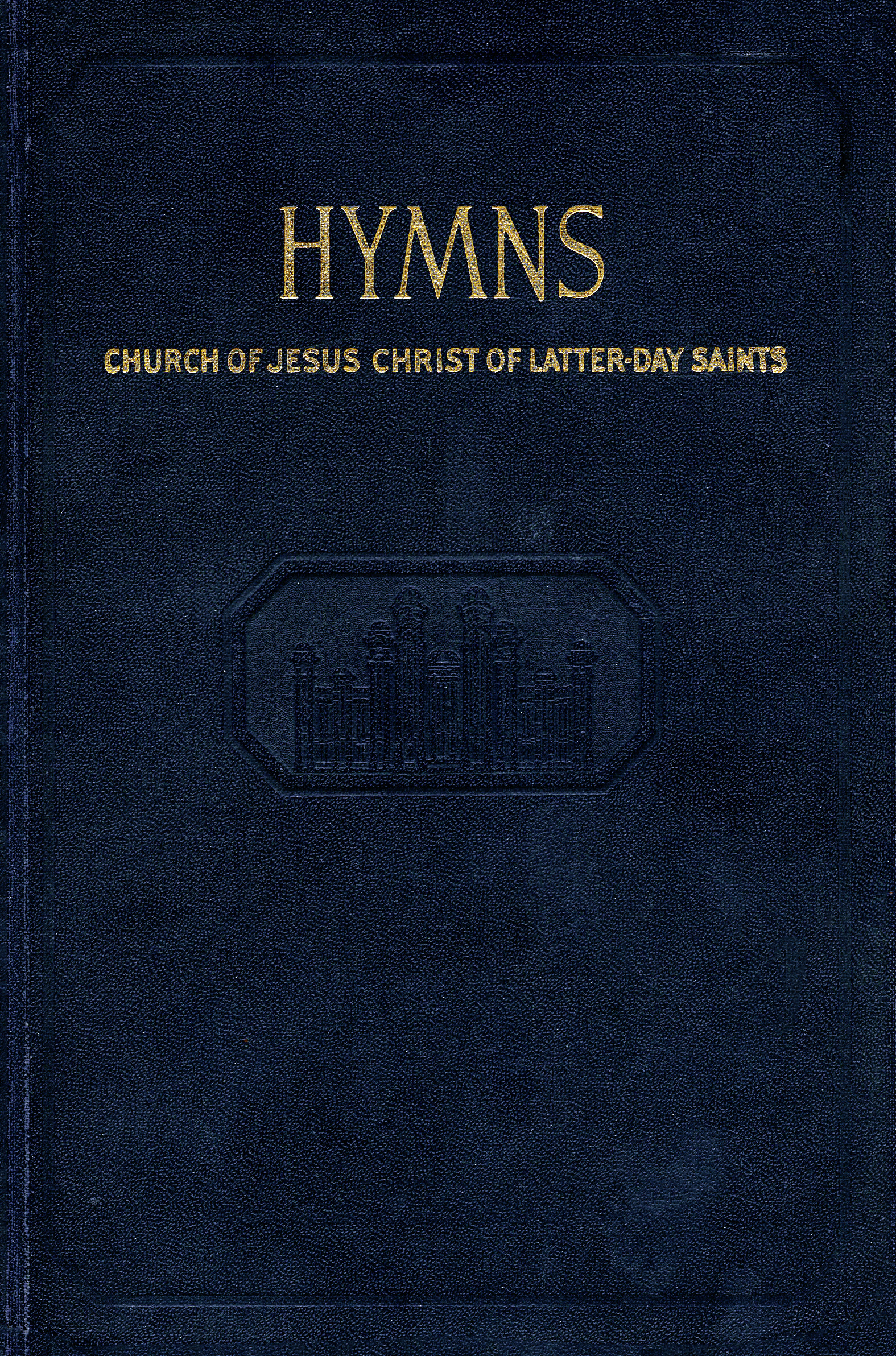
1948 LDS Hymnbook

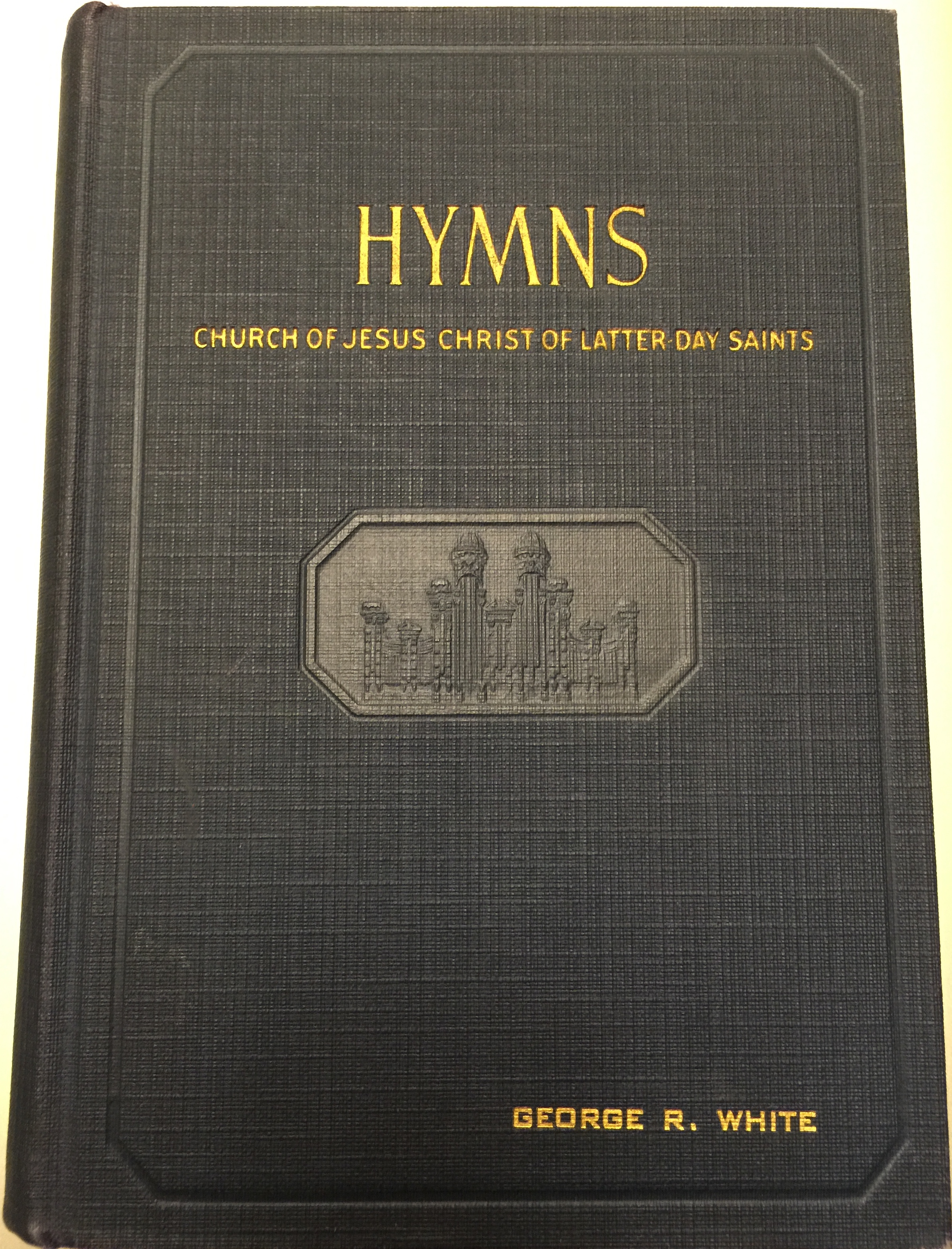
1950 LDS Hymnbook

In 1948, a new hymnbook that replaced both the Latter-day Saint Hymns (1927) and the Deseret Sunday School Songs was published under the title Hymns: The Church of Jesus Christ of Latter-day Saints and served as the official hymnbook of The Church of Jesus Christ of Latter-day Saints from 1948 to 1985. The 1948 edition included 387 hymns.

== Background and Development ==
With the deaths of Evan Stephens and George Careless in the early 1930s, the pioneer-era musicians that had dominated LDS hymnody had died, leaving the torch to a new generation of LDS musicians, such as Tracy Y. Cannon. Whereas the previous generation had heavily emphasized homespun music and they were often heavily influenced by operatic composers like Arthur Sullivan, the new generation largely turned to more classical Protestant sources for inspiration. The music committee even specifically noted that many of the finest and favorite hymns in the Mormon tradition were adopted from Protestant sources rather than Mormon ones, and suggested that they seek out more hymns from the Protestant tradition. They were also influenced by the research and writings of Sterling Wheelwright, who felt that LDS hymnals were losing their relevance through focusing on upbeat but trivial hymns rather than intimate and meditative ones. Overall, they sought to publish a hymnbook with a "better standard of musical expression" than previous LDS hymnals. Still, Church leaders weren't entirely trusting of leaving Mormon musicians to their own devices to select hymns and they created an executive committee of four apostles to oversee their work.

The music committee, now proceeding with direct apostolic oversight, sponsored an ongoing hymn contest for Mormons and set about collecting Protestant hymns. The latter were often slightly edited to conform to LDS theology. Frank I. Kooyman provided several of the new Mormon hymn texts that the committee favored, such as “Thy Spirit, Lord, Has Stirred Our Souls” and “When in the Wondrous Realms Above.” New musical compositions were encouraged to be dignified, singable, and similar to older styles of hymns (particularly the Johann Sebastian Bach chorales), perhaps best exemplified by Temple Square organist Alexander Schreiner’s neo-Bachian settings for hymns. The world-renowned classical composer Leroy Robertson also submitted music that was deemed suitable for many of the texts that were accepted by the committee. It was acknowledged, however, that the general membership of the Church might prefer the lighter hymns the committee was seeking to eliminate over the “better standard of musical expression” they were pushing for. Thus, committee head Tracy Y. Cannon suggested that the transition be performed gradually.

== Publication ==
The resulting hymnbook dropped many of the Evan Stephens hymns that were prominent in previous hymnbooks and incorporated less hymns by committee members than the previous hymnbook had. Leroy Robertson had twelve, Alexander Schreiner eleven, and Tracy Cannon only had five. Protestant hymns formed approximately half of the 387 hymns selected for inclusion.

== 1950 Edition ==
Despite the involvement of apostles, some Church leaders questioned the hymns chosen by the committee after publication, and members tended to complain about the size and poor binding of the book. Due to this lackluster response, the music committee yielded and revised the hymnbook, releasing a modified second edition in 1950. This second edition dropped some of the well-respected Protestant hymns in favor of some popular hymns included in previous LDS hymnbooks that they had deleted. This change, in turn, set a precedent for the waning control of the music committee and their ability to push for what they deemed to be properly ascetic over lighter popular music in the Church's hymnbooks.

The differences between the 1948 and 1950 editions were as follows:

1948 Hymns	No.	1950 Hymns	No.
Angels from the Realms of Glory	5	As swiftly my days go out on the wing	5
Cease, ye fond parents, cease to weep	9	In hymns of praise	9
Come, O thou King of kings	19	Come along, come along	19
Come, labor on	20	Come, O thou King of kings	20
From all that dwell below the skies	38	Each cooing dove	38
Father of light	39	The First Noel	39
Good Christian men, rejoice	52	From all that dwell below the skies	52
Hail to the brightness of Zion's glad morning	57	Guide us, O Thou great Jehovah	57
Hark! The evening hymn is stealing	58	Have I done any good in the world today	58
I Heard the Bells on Christmas Day	72	There is a land whose sunny vales	72
I Need Thee Every Hour	78	Beautiful Zion, built above	78
Mid pleasures and palaces	107	For our devotions, Father	107
Mine eyes have seen the glory	109	Precious Savior, dear Redeemer	109
Lead me into life eternal	110	Choose the right	110
O Lord responsive to thy call	138	O my Father, thou that dwellest	138
There is beauty all around	170	Dearest children, God is near you	170
I wander through the stilly night	171	Now to heaven our prayer	171
We Gather Together	182	Hail to the brightness of Zion's glad morning	182
Though in the outward Church below	183	Awake! O ye people, the Savior is coming	183
Rejoice, ye pure in heart	185	Mid pleasures and palaces	185
Sometime we'll understand	267	Not now, but in the coming years	267
Proud? yes, of our home	278	Rest, rest for the weary soul	278
Sometime, somewhere	286	Unanswered yet? the prayer	286
Thou dost not weep, to weep alone	294	I wander through the stilly night	294
Ye simple souls who stray	298	The Lord imparted from above	298
Sometime we'll understand	334	Not now, but in the coming years	334
Rock of Ages	338	Come, lay his books and papers by	338
Who are these arrayed in white	343	Reverently and meekly now	343

In 1960, two more hymns were added to the hymnal:

FIRST LINE	HYMN NUMBER
Who's On the Lord's Side?	388
This Earth Was Once a Garden Place	389

== Organization ==
The hymnal as published in 1948

1–50
Number	Hymn	Words	Music	Notes
1	Abide With Me! Fast Falls with Eventide	Henry F. Lyte	William Henry Monk	
2	Abide with Me, 'Tis Eventide	M. Lowrie Hofford	Harrison Millard	
3	Behold Thy Sons and Daughters, Lord	Parley P. Pratt	Alexander Schreiner	
4	All Creatures of Our God and King	Francis of Assisi	From Cologn	
5	Angels, From the Realms of Glory	James Montgomery	Henry Smart	
6	Beautiful Zion for Me	Charles W. Penrose	J. R. Thomas	Arr. by Evan Stephens
7	Behold! A Royal Army	Fanny J. Crosby	Adam Geibel	
8	God, Our Father, Hear Us Pray	Annie Malin		Arr. from Louis M. Gottschalk
9	Cease, Ye Fond Parents, Cease to Weep	Eliza R. Snow	Franz Josef Haydn	
10	Christ the Lord Is Risen Today	Charles Wesley	Henry Carey	
11	Come All Ye Saints and Sing His Praise	Lorin F. Wheelwright	Lorin F. Wheelwright	
12	Come, All Ye Saints Who Dwell on Earth	William W. Phelps	Old Tune	
13	Come, Come, Ye Saints	William Clayton	Old English Tune	
14	Come, Follow Me	John Nicholson	S. McBurney	
15	Come, Go With Me, Beyond the Sea	Cyrus H. Wheelock		Arr. by Thomas C. Griggs
16	Come Hail the Cause of Zion's Youth	Bertha A. Kleinman		
17	Come, Let Us Anew	Charles Wesley	James Lucas	
18	Come, Listen to a Prophet's Voice	Joseph J. Daynes		
19	Come, O Thou King of Kings	Parley P. Pratt		
20	Come, Labor On	Jane Borthwick	Alexander Schreiner	
21	Come Unto Jesus	Orson Pratt Huish	Orson Pratt Huish	
22	Come, We That Love the Lord	Isaac Watts	Aaron Williams	
23	Come, Ye Children of the Lord	James H. Wallis		
24	Come, Thou Fount of Every Blessing	Robert Robinson	John Wyeth	
25	Come, Ye Disconsolate	Thomas Moore		Alt. by Thomas Hastings; Arr. From Samuel Webbe
26	Dear to the Heart of the Shepherd	Mary B. Wingate	William J. Kirkpatrick	
27	Do What is Right	E. Kaillmark		
28	Down by the River's Verdant Side			
29	Come, Ye Thankful People, Come	Henry Alford (theologian)	George Elvey	
30	Earth, With Her Ten Thousand Flowers	W. W. Phelps (Mormon)	Thomas C. Griggs	
31	Ere You Left Your Room This Morning			
32	Come, Sing to the Lord	Gerrit de Jong Jr.	Gerrit de Jong Jr.	
33	Far, Far Away on Judea's Plains	John Menzies Macfarlane	John Menzies Macfarlane	
34	Farewell All Earthly Honors		William Batchelder Bradbury	
35	God of Power, God of Right	Wallace F. Bennett	Tracy Y. Cannon	
36	Father in Heaven	Angus S. Hibbard	Friedrich F. Flemming	
37	Father of Light	William C. Doane	J. Albert Jeffery	
38	From All that Dwell Below the Skies	Issac Watts	John Hatton	
39	The First Noel	Traditional	Traditional	
40	Father in Heaven, We Do Believe	Parley P. Pratt	Jane Romney Crawford	
41	From Greenland's Icy Mountains	Reginald Heber	Lowell Mason	
42	Firm as the Mountains Around Us	Ruth May Fox	Alfred M. Durham	
43	Father, They Children to Thee Now Raise	Evan Stephens	Evan Stephens	
44	Glory to God on High	James Boden	Felice Giardini	
45	The Glorious Gospel Light Has Shone	Joel H. Johnson	Leroy J. Robertson	
46	God Loved Us, So He Sent His Son	Edward P. Kimball	Alexander Schreiner	
47	God Be with You	J. E. Rankin	W. G. Tomer	
48	God Moves in a Mysterious Way	William Cowper		
49	God of Our Fathers, Known of Old	Rudyard Kipling	Leroy J. Robertson	
50	God of Our Fathers, We Come Unto Thee	Charles W. Penrose	Ebenezer Beesley	

1–50
Number	Hymn	Words	Music	Notes
51	God of Our Fathers, Whose Almighty Hand	Daniel C. Roberts	G. W. Warren	
52	Good Christian Men, Rejoice	John Mason Neale	Fourteenth Century Melody	
53	Great King of Heaven, Our Hearts We Raise	Carrie S. Thomas	Leroy J. Robertson	
54	God Save the King	Henry Carey	Henry Carey	
55	Great God, to Thee My Evening Song	M. M. Steel	Edward P. Kimball	
56	Guide Us, O Thou Great Jehovah	Robert Robinson	John Hughes	
57	Hail to the Brightness of Zion's Glad Morning	Thomas Hastings	Edwin F. Parry	
58	Hark! The Evening Hymn Is Stealing	Thomas Moore	Russian Air	
59	Hear Thou Our Hymn, O Lord	Frank W. Asper	Frank W. Asper	
60	Hark! The Herald Angels Sing	Charles Wesley	Felix Mendelssohn	
61	He is Risen	Cecil Frances Alexander	Joachim Neander	
62	High on a Mountain Top	John H. Johnson	Ebenezer Beesley	
63	Holy Temples on Mount Zion	Archibald F. Bennett	Alexander Schreiner	
64	Hope of Israel	R. B. Baird	R. B. Baird	
65	How Beautiful Thy Temples Lord	Frank I. Kooyman	Tracy Y. Cannon	
85	How Firm a Foundation	Robert Keen	J. Ellis	
67	How Gentle God's Commands	Philip Doddridge	H. G. Naegeli	
68	How Great the Wisdom and the Love	Eliza R. Snow	Thomas McIntyre	
69	How Long, O Lord, Most Holy and True	John A. Widtsoe	B. Cecil Gates	
70	How Wonderous and Great	Henry U. Onderdonk	J. Michael Haydn	
71	I Have Work Enough to Do	Josephine Pollard	William J. Kirkpatrick	
72	I Heard the Bells on Christmas Day	Henry W. Longfellow	J. Baptiste Calkin	
73	Improve the Shining Moments	R. B. Baird	R. B. Baird	
74	In a World Where Sorrow Ever Will Be Known (Scatter Sunshine)	Lanta Wilson Smith	E. O. Excell	
75	It May Not Be on the Mountain Height (I'll go where you want me to go)	Mary M. Brown	Carrie E. Rounsefell	
76	God of our Fathers	Rudyard Kipling	Isaac B. Woodbury	

== See also ==
- List of English-language hymnals by denomination
- Category:Latter Day Saint hymnals
- Hymns in the Church of Jesus Christ of Latter-day Saints
