= Fruit Heights, Utah =

City in Utah, United States

- City
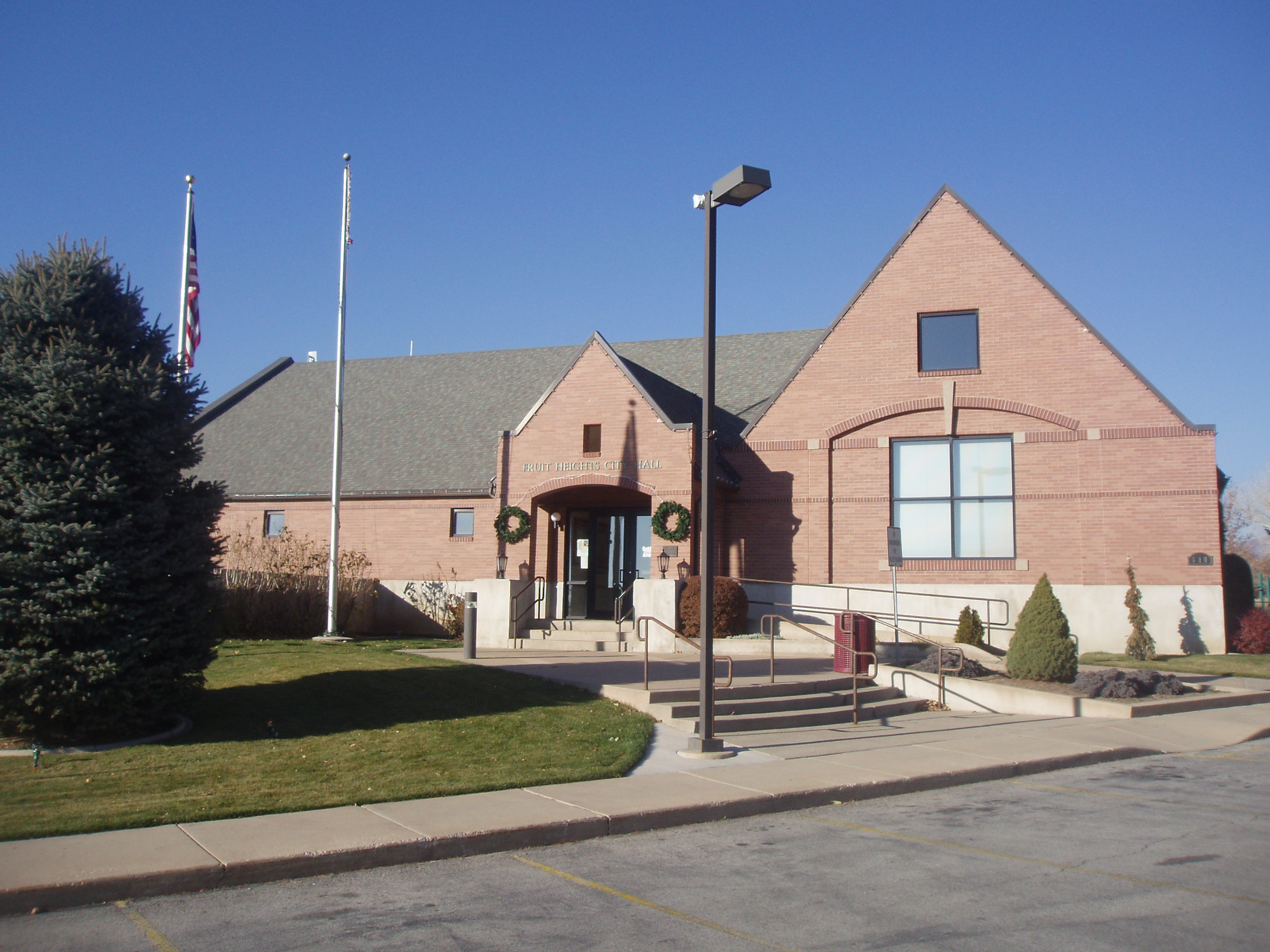
- Fruit Heights City Hall

- Location in Davis County and the state of Utah
- Coordinates: 41°1′41″N 111°54′38″W
- Country: United States
- State: Utah
- County: Davis
- Incorporated: 1939

Area
  - Total: 2.30 sq mi (5.95 km^{2})
  - Land: 2.29 sq mi (5.93 km^{2})
  - Water: 0.0077 sq mi (0.02 km^{2})
- Elevation: 4,698 ft (1,432 m)

Population (2020)
  - Total: 6,101
  - Density: 2,719.3/sq mi (1,049.94/km^{2})
- Time zone: UTC-7 (Mountain (MST))
  - Summer (DST): UTC-6 (MDT)
- ZIP code: 84037
- Area codes: 385, 801
- FIPS code: 49-27490
- GNIS feature ID: 2410552
- Website: www.fruitheights.gov

Fruit Heights is a city in eastern Davis County, Utah, United States. It is part of the Ogden–Clearfield, Utah Metropolitan Statistical Area. It lies along the Wasatch Front adjacent to the larger cities of Farmington and Kaysville. Its population was 6,101 at the 2020 census, a significant increase of 4,987 at the 2010 census.

== Geography ==
Fruit Heights is bordered by the city of Kaysville to the north and west, the city of Farmington to the south and the Wasatch Range to the east. According to the United States Census Bureau, Fruit Heights has a total area of 2.3 square miles (5.9 km^{2}), of which 0.01 square miles (0.02 km^{2}), or 0.42%, is water.

== Demographics ==
Historical population
Census	Pop.	Note	%±
1950	124		—
1960	175		41.1%
1970	800		357.1%
1980	2,728		241.0%
1990	3,900		43.0%
2000	4,701		20.5%
2010	4,987		6.1%
2020	6,101		22.3%
U.S. Decennial Census

=== 2020 census ===
As of the 2020 census, Fruit Heights had a population of 6,101. The median age was 36.8 years, 31.2% of residents were under the age of 18, and 15.6% of residents were 65 years of age or older. For every 100 females there were 100.2 males, and for every 100 females age 18 and over there were 99.1 males age 18 and over.

100.0% of residents lived in urban areas, while 0.0% lived in rural areas.

There were 1,810 households in Fruit Heights, of which 42.5% had children under the age of 18 living in them. Of all households, 75.3% were married-couple households, 8.3% were households with a male householder and no spouse or partner present, and 14.1% were households with a female householder and no spouse or partner present. About 12.4% of all households were made up of individuals and 5.9% had someone living alone who was 65 years of age or older.

There were 1,865 housing units, of which 2.9% were vacant. The homeowner vacancy rate was 0.5% and the rental vacancy rate was 4.6%.

Racial composition as of the 2020 census
Race	Number	Percent
White	5,537	90.8%
Black or African American	22	0.4%
American Indian and Alaska Native	17	0.3%
Asian	91	1.5%
Native Hawaiian and Other Pacific Islander	20	0.3%
Some other race	85	1.4%
Two or more races	329	5.4%
Hispanic or Latino (of any race)	309	5.1%

=== 2010 census ===
As of the 2010 census, the total population of Fruit Heights was 4,987, which is 6.08% more than it was in 2000. There were 1,466 households and 1,285 families residing in the city. The population density was 2,184.73 people per square mile (843.53 people/km^{2}). The racial makeup of the city was 95.79% White, 0.52% African American, 0.48% Native American, 1.22% Asian, 0.84% from other races, and 1.14% from two or more races. Hispanic or Latino of any race were 3.11% of the population.

There were 1,256 households, out of which 48.5% had children under the age of 18 living with them, 81.5% were married couples living together, 5.7% had a female householder with no husband present, and 10.8% were non-families. 9.6% of all households were made up of individuals, and 5.7% had someone living alone who was 65 years of age or older. The average household size was 3.74, and the average family size was 4.02.

In the city, the population was spread out, with 35.1% under 18, 12.3% from 18 to 24, 20.2% from 25 to 44, 24.2% from 45 to 64, and 8.2% who were 65 years of age or older. The median age was 29 years. For every 100 females, there were 99.4 males. For every 100 females aged 18 and over, there were 98.7 males.

The median income for a household in the city was $79,192, and the median income for a family was $82,459. Males had a median income of $62,930 versus $26,042 for females. The per capita income was $24,188. About 0.5% of families and 0.7% of the population were below the poverty line, including 1.1% of those under age 18 and none of those age 65 or over.

== See also ==
- List of cities and towns in Utah

== Notable people ==
- James Cowser, former NFL player
- J. Spencer Kinard, former radio and television personality
