= Hattie Tyng Griswold =

American poet

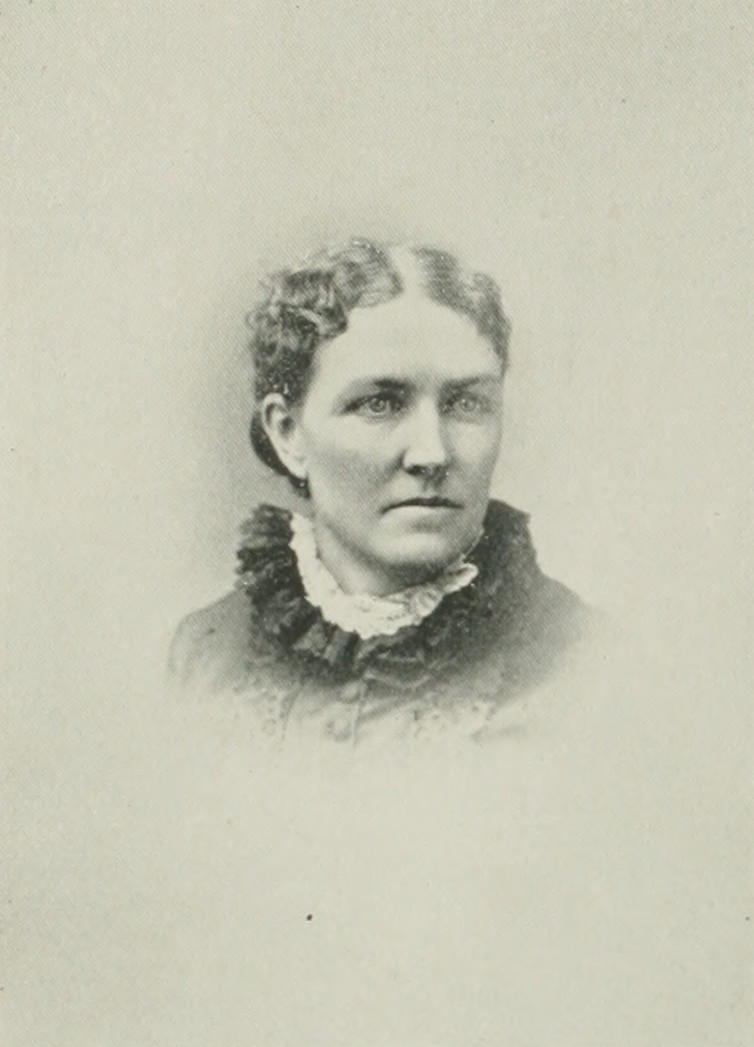
- Photo in A Woman of the Century
- Born: Hattie Tyng; January 26, 1842 Boston, Massachusetts, U.S.
- Died: January 2, 1909 (aged 66) Columbus, Wisconsin, U.S.
- Occupation: author
- Language: English
- Genre: stories, sketches, poems
- Spouse: Eugene Sherwood Griswold

Hattie Tyng Griswold (née Tyng; January 26, 1842 – January 22, 1909) was an American author of the long nineteenth century. She wrote many stories, sketches, and poems. Born in Boston, Griswold relocated with her family to Columbus, Wisconsin, in 1850, where, in the course of time, she married, raised her children, and did much of her work as an author. Her home was a meeting place of many of the notable people of the day, for she had an extensive personal acquaintance with literary and other celebrities. The books by which she is best-known are: Apple Blossoms, Waiting on Destiny, Lucile and Her Friends, and The Home Life of Great Authors. "Under the Daisies" is one of her best-known poems. She wrote stories for the Home Journal of New York, The Knickerbocker, Madison State Journal, Old and New, The Christian Register, and Boston Commonwealth. Griswold served as president of the Woman's Christian Temperance Union in her locale.

== Early life and education ==
Hattie Tyng was born in Boston, Massachusetts, January 26, 1842 (1840 is also mentioned). Her father, Rev. Dudley Tyng, was a Universalist minister. He was a bookworm and a dreamer, very poetic by nature, but never penned his inspirations in aught save sermons. He was born in Maine, where the earlier years of Griswold's life were spent. Her mother's maiden name was Sarah Haines. She was a native of New York, with a keen knowledge of human nature, a great fund of incisive sarcasm, love of argument and disputation upon religious and intellectual themes, and boundless pity for the poor and suffering. Both parents were New Englanders. They were Universalists, converted by Hosea Ballou, in Boston, in early life, and abolitionists. Griswold's unusual inheritance of the poetic gift and intense practicality combined may be traced as a cross between her father's ideality and her mother's Puritanical attention to actual details. Of her parents, Griswold wrote: "Religion absorbed all his mind and all his heart, and left little for practical life. Both embraced Universalism, in its earliest and weakest days, and fought for it with the aggressiveness of the early days to the end."

She was about 11 when her parents settled in Columbus, Wisconsin and she spent the rest of her life there. Soon after their removal, she commenced writing for the local papers, and by her friends, was considered a prodigy. She first wrote for the New Covenant when it was under the control of the Rev. Lemuel Bickford Mason. When the Home Journal of New York was under the control of Nathaniel Parker Willis, and The Knickerbocker was the leading magazine of the country, Griswold, a mere girl, was a contributor to both. When 14 years old, she began to attract attention as one marked with literary ability by her short stories and poems in the Madison State Journal. She also wrote for The Courier-Journal of Louisville, Kentucky.

== Career ==
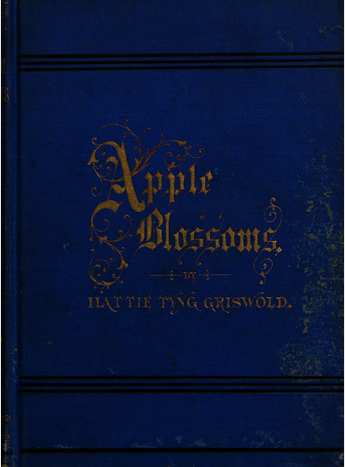
Apple-blossoms (1874)

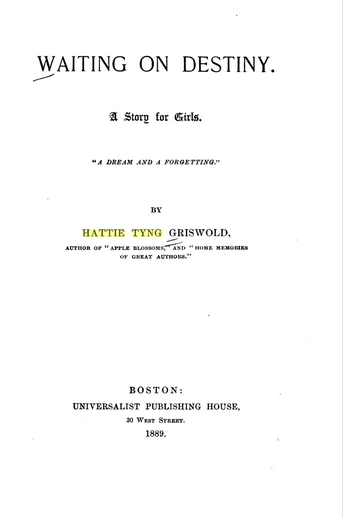
Waiting on Destiny: A Story for Girls (1889)

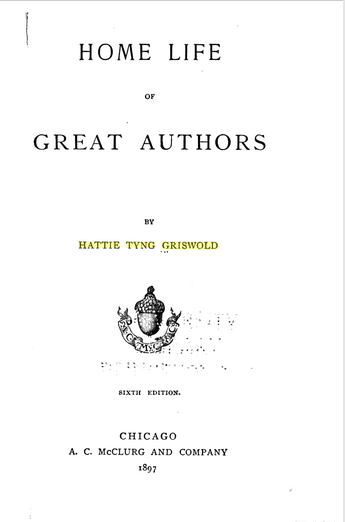
Home Life of Great Authors (1897)

=== Writer ===
Her acquaintance with Mason led to her becoming a member of his family when she was about 18 years old, and she passed several months teaching school in Winnetka, Illinois, where he resided. Very soon after, Rev. Daniel Parker Livermore took the editorial charge of the New Covenant, and Griswold began a pleasant acquaintance with his wife, Mary A. Livermore, who assisted her in many ways, with kindness and attention. Griswold was now an established contributor to Willis's New York Home Journal and Charles Godfrey Leland's Knickerbocker Magazine. She had established a permanent friendship with both of these editors, which was pleasant and useful to her. Willis said of her: "Her imaginings are delicate, and the simplicity with which she expresses her thoughts charms me". She was at this time writing stories for several papers and periodicals, for which she received remuneration, such as Old and New, The Christian Register, Boston Commonwealth, and other publications.

In 1868, in the spirit of Universalism, she wrote a long story, entitled "Fate and Faith". It was published as a serial in the "Ladies' Repository"; it was a struggle after the "eternal verities of God and immortality". Griswold continued to be a regular contributor to the New Covenant after John Wesley Hanson took control, in 1869, until it united with The Star in the West, continuing to communicate with the public through its pages in prose and verse.

The first edition of her poems, Apple Blossoms, was published in Milwaukee, by Strickland, in 1874; the second edition by Jansen, McClurg & Co., Chicago, in 1877. Some of these poems had been published previously, and others had not. A book review stated the book was one of rare merit, with an undertone of sadness, a refrain of grief and pathos, running through all her poems; but their lesson was always of patience and resignation and hope, rather than despondency or despair. Their sadness was that of life and of a woman's heart, when it has known "a sorrow's crown of sorrows," such as is portrayed in 'Three Kisses'".

Home Life of Great Authors, published in Chicago, in 1877, included descriptive sketches of many authors, with glimpses of their home life and personal and domestic character: Goethe, William Wordsworth, Charles Lamb, Percy Bysshe Shelley, Ralph Waldo Emerson, George Sand, Tennyson, Whittier, Robert Browning and Elizabeth B. Browning, Edgar Allan Poe, Eliot, Robert Burns, De Quincey, North, Washington Irving, Thomas Carlyle, Macaulay, Nathaniel Hawthorne, Oliver Wendell Holmes Sr., Charlotte Brontë, Thackeray, Charles Kingsley, Madame de Stael, Scott, Lord Byron, William Cullen Bryant, Victor Hugo, Lytton, Henry Wadsworth Longfellow, James Russell Lowell, Margaret Fuller, Charles Dickens, and Ruskin. As its title would indicate, the book aimed to give a more personal and intimate view of men and women well-known to fame than was to be found in most reference works. The young readers of this volume learned that dates and statistics do not enable them to know people; they need to have some personal details as to the habits and daily lives of the people about whom they read. Griswold said in one of her works that as she had had such a hard time when she was a girl getting any picture in her mind of the great people about whom she read, that she determined to make it easier for other boys and girls to obtain these mental pictures; that is why she wrote The Home Life of Great Authors.

In her time, none of the women poets of America wrote anything more widely known or popular of its class than Griswold's short poem, "Under the Daisies".

The song later appeared in an American periodical, extracted from its source by numerous newspapers throughout the country, but unfortunately the name of its author was not given. In this way, it was copied by almost the entire press of the US and England, and became immensely popular. Conjectures were made as to its authorship, and query editors of newspapers and magazines were appealed to, but the authorship of the poem had been lost. It was in this uncredited state that it fell under the attention of Harrison Millard, the composer, who in turn set it to music. As a ballad, it renewed its popularity. It later transpired that the authorship of the song belonged to Griswold. The discovery was brought to the attention of Millard, who wrote the author assuring Griswold that thereafter, her name would be attached to the ballad in all subsequent editions or forms in which it might be issued.

Personal Sketches of Recent Authors contained sketches of Tennyson, Arnold, Ruskin, Robert Louis Stevenson, Tolstoi, Henry David Thoreau, Ernest Renan, Du Maurier, Huxley, William Dean Howells, Rudyard Kipling, Bayard Taylor, Charles Darwin, Elizabeth B. Browning, Harriet Beecher Stowe, Louisa May Alcott, Christina Rossetti, and J. M. Barrie. Other books included, Waiting on Destiny (Boston, 1889) a story for girls, and Lucille and Her Friends (Chicago, 1890).

=== Social reformer ===
Much of the work of her later years was in the field of practical philanthropy as well as literature. She was a delegate from Wisconsin to the National Conference of Charities in Saint Paul, Minnesota. She read papers that attracted attention in various Unitarian conferences and in State associations. Griswold led locally in the temperance cause for years. Since childhood, she showed sympathy for alcoholics and their families, and she worked to help and cure them. She served as president of the Woman's Christian Temperance Union, and president of the Youths' Alliance, a child's organization for similar work, and for the personal temperance of its members. She supplemented these labors with many written articles. The subject of associated charities also engaged her attention.

== Personal life ==
In 1863, in Columbus, she married Eugene Sherwood Griswold, a merchant, and they raised their three daughters here. Her home was a meeting place of many of the notable people of the day, for she had an extensive personal acquaintance with literary and other celebrities. Griswold died in Columbus, Wisconsin on January 22, 1909.

== Selected works ==
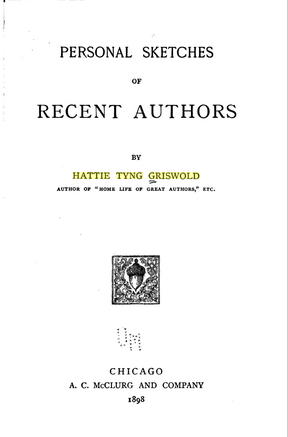
Personal sketches of recent authors (1898)

- 18-?, The Clue: poem
- 1865, Under the Daisies!
- 1877, Apple-Blossoms
- 1887, Home Life of Great Authors
- 1889, Waiting on Destiny: A Story for Girls
- 1892, Fencing with Shadows
- 1892, Lucile and Her Friends: A Story for Girls
- 1898, Personal Sketches of Recent Authors

=== Hymns ===
- "Children, to the rescue"
- "Fair are the clouds in the summer sky"
- "I've enlisted in the ranks"
- "Let us be tender, and trusty, and true"
