= Ted Kimball =

Salt Lake City radio personality (1910–1985)

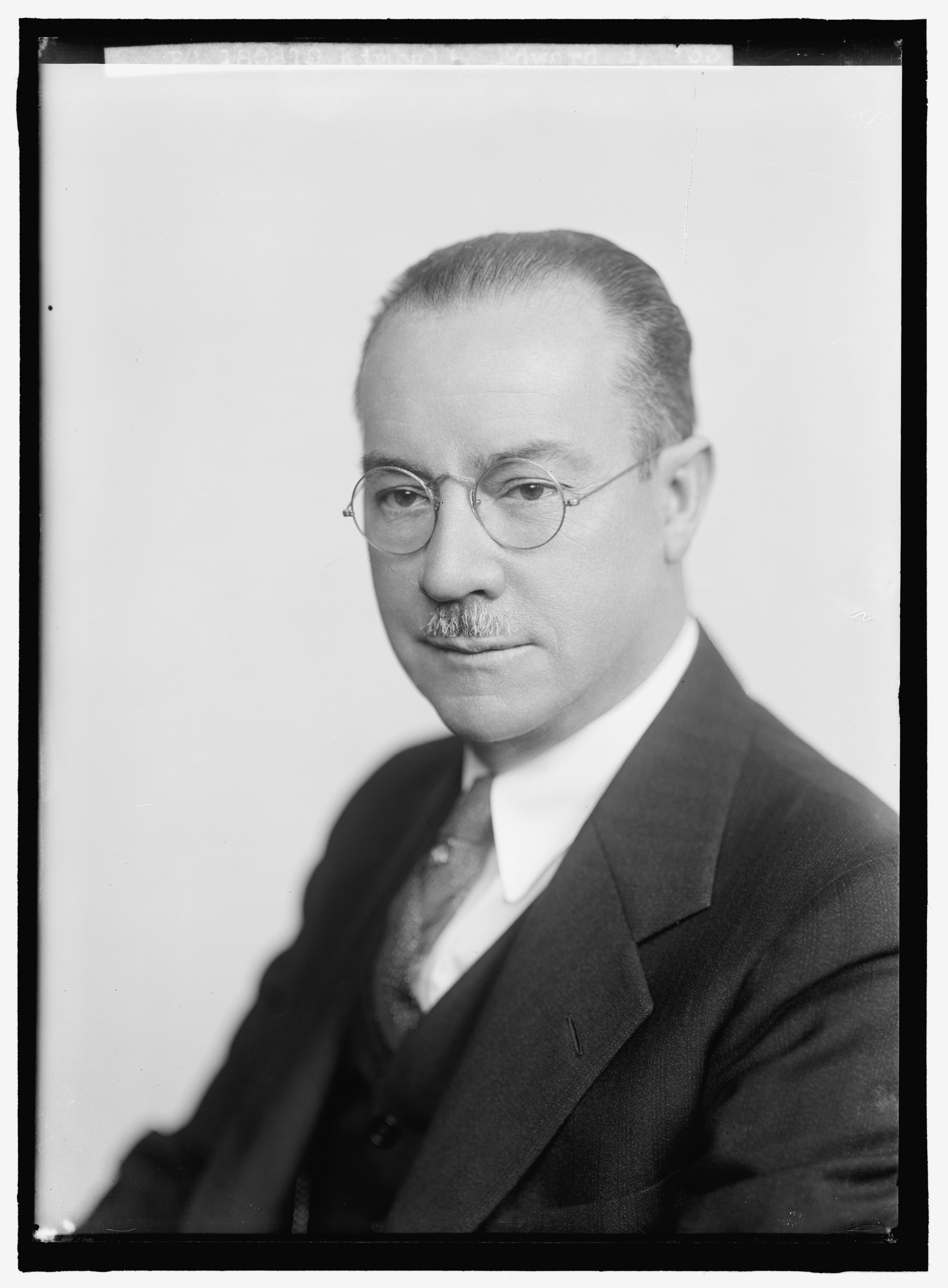
Ted Kimball

Edward Beatie "Ted" Kimball (February 17, 1910 – August 5, 1985), was a professional radio host in the Salt Lake City region. He was the first announcer of the Mormon Tabernacle Choir broadcast "Music and the Spoken Word".

Kimball was born in Salt Lake City in 1910, the son of Edward Partridge Kimball. In 1929, when "Music and the Spoken Word" began radio broadcasting, Kimball was the 19-year-old son of the choir's organist. For the first broadcast a long microphone cable stretched over a block from radio station KDYL to the Salt Lake Tabernacle. With the station's only microphone suspended from the Tabernacle ceiling, Ted Kimball announced each song while standing on a ladder during the whole show. After only eleven months, Kimball was replaced by Richard L. Evans, who is considered the first regular narrator and voice of the show. Evans expanded the narrations to include inspirational thoughts, called "sermonettes", and stayed with the show for 41 years.

In the early 1980s, Kimball worked as a part-time radio host for KWHO-AM in Salt Lake City, a commercial fine arts radio station.

| Preceded by — | Narrator, Music and the Spoken Word; July 15, 1929–June 1930 | Succeeded by Richard L. Evans |
