= Lloyd D. Newell =

American radio presenter

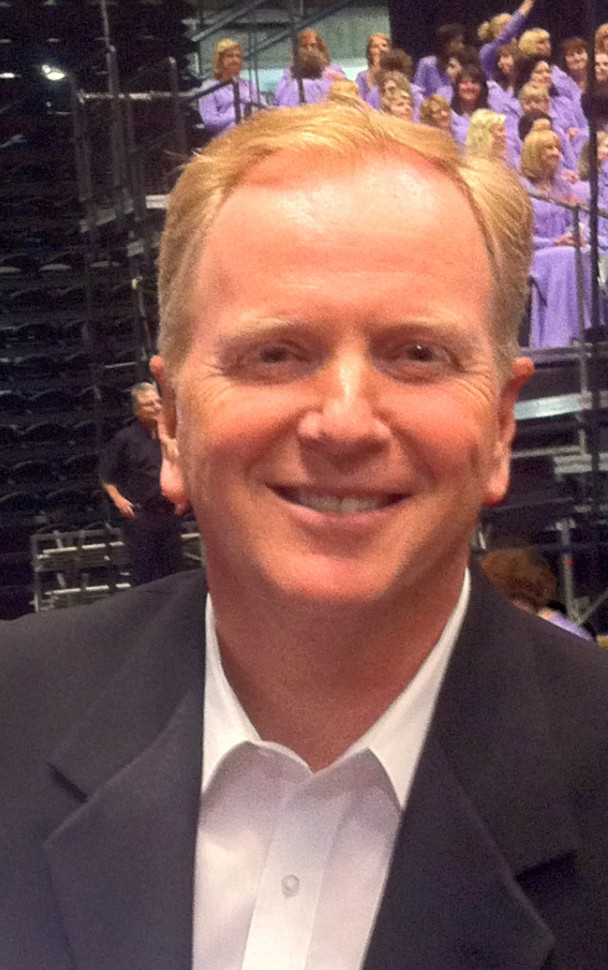
- Lloyd Newell in June 2013
- Born: Lloyd David Newell; 1956 (age 69–70)
- Education: Ph.D. in Family Sciences, Brigham Young University
- Occupations: Television journalist, announcer, author
- Years active: 1990-present
- Notable credit(s): Music and the Spoken Word, CNN, WSEE-TV
- Spouse: Karmel
- Children: four

Lloyd David Newell (born 1956) is an American journalist, university professor, author, and announcer. He is best-known for the thirty-three years as host of Music and the Spoken Word, the oldest weekly nationwide radio broadcast in the United States. Born into the Church of Jesus Christ of Latter-day Saints (LDS Church), he is a descendant of Susannah Stone Lloyd, a member of the Willie handcart company.

== Early life and education ==
Lloyd D. Newell was born on July 17, 1956, the second of the seven children of Neil Oscar Newell and Verna Louise (née Lloyd). His father was a crane operator for Geneva Steel for 37 years. From early childhood, Newell listened to the weekly broadcasts of Music and the Spoken Word in his family's Utah home. After graduating from Orem High School he attended Brigham Young University (BYU), earning a bachelor's degree in communications in 1980. Although he'd intended to attend law school afterward, he changed his mind and instead earned a master's degree in communication, focused on broadcast journalism, in 1985.

== Career ==
He worked for a time in television as both a news anchor and news magazine host in Salt Lake City, Utah and Erie, Pennsylvania. He was also a management consultant and seminar leader. His father's death in an industrial accident at Geneva Steel in 1986 and his mother's poor health required his return from Pennsylvania to Utah. From then until he joined BYU as a full-time educator in 1999, he was a writer, producer and narrator/announcer for the US Department of Veteran Affairs, Bonneville Communications, Novell, Deseret Book, and other companies. He also flew to Atlanta, Georgia as a weekend anchor for CNN.

Newell's work with Bonneville Communications led to his invitation as a backup host of Music and the Spoken Word. In 1990, he became the interim host following the retirement of Spence Kinard. A year later Gordon B. Hinckley, then a counselor in the LDS Church's First Presidency, appointed Newell as the permanent host. When Newell announced his 1992 engagement to Karmel Howell on the air, the Tabernacle Choir serenaded them with "Let Me Call You Sweetheart."

In 1993, he left CNN and began a part-time appointment on the faculty of BYU's Department of Church History and Doctrine while continuing his writing, producing, and announcing work for the Foundation for Ancient Research and Mormon Studies, Deseret Book, Living Scriptures, and other companies. Five years later he joined the full-time faculty. The following year, after earning a Ph.D. in Family Sciences, he became an assistant professor. In 2005, he became an associate professor and in 2010 he became a full professor, all in the same department. He also became an associate faculty member in BYU's School of Family Life.

== Music and the Spoken Word ==
Newell delivered over 1,750 messages during his tenure as the announcer for Music and the Spoken Word from 1990 to 2024. He has been noted for delivering his message with a soothing voice and without denominational boundaries.

Mike Leavitt, former Utah governor and president of the Tabernacle Choir, described Newell as "one of the most prolific and influential contributors of inspirational literature in the history of modern media", noting that his messages became "digestible sermons and insights" for a global audience.

The host role is an LDS Church calling. Gordon B. Hinckley asked him to serve in 1990 with the charge to deliver messages that were "inspirational gems"—inspiring, uplifting, and based in truth. Each message, typically two to three minutes long, was intended to touch people's hearts, bring a ray of hope, and spread goodwill. During the COVID-19 pandemic, he recorded multiple messages in the church's empty Conference Center, which the crew then spliced into previous choir performances.

His messages resonated across faiths. Non-Latter-day Saints often wrote that the broadcast was their de facto worship service, with one listener saying, “This is my church.” He received thousands of letters from listeners who said his words came at just the right moment to offer comfort during illness, strength in hardship, or renewed hope. Though he has never been a minister, pastor or bishop, some of these letters are addressed to "Reverend Newell" at the "Church of the Crossroads of the West." Listeners also described his presence as familiar and familial, like “a trusted friend or family member” sharing sacred truths. Derrick Porter, his successor, recalled mimicking Newell’s tone as a child during mock general conferences, underscoring how his voice was woven into Latter-day Saint culture. As Newell prepared to conclude his service in June 2024, Leavitt called the moment "historic," emphasizing that Newell had become an "icon in inspirational broadcasting."

== Personal life ==
He and his wife, Karmel, are the parents of four children. From 2021 to 2024, he served in the LDS Church as a counselor in a stake presidency. On December 10, 2023, he announced his upcoming departure from Music and the Spoken Word in the summer of 2024 to serve as president of the church's California Los Angeles Mission. His last broadcast was on June 16, 2024. Derrick Porter was appointed as his successor.

== Works ==
- 1992: The Divine Connection: Understanding Your Inherent Worth via Internet Archive
- 1994: May Peace Be With You : Messages from the Spoken Word. Salt Lake City: Deseret Book. OCLC: 1342366033
- 1998: The Divine Connection: Unlocking Your Infinite Potential. Salt Lake City: Shadow Mountain. OCLC: 37878760 Salt Lake City: Deseret Book Company. OCLC: 1331612387
- 1999: This Day and Always. Salt Lake City: Deseret Book Company. OCLC: 51590234
- 2002: with Millet, Robert L.. Jesus, the Very Thought of Thee: Daily Reflections on the New Testament. Salt Lake City: Eagle Gate. OCLC: 50198379
- 2003: with Millet, Robert L. When Ye Shall Receive These Things: Daily Reflections on the Book of Mormon. Salt Lake City: Deseret Book Company. OCLC: 52845642
- 2003: with Evans, Richard L. and Kinard, J. Spencer. Messages from Music and the Spoken Word--75th Anniversary. Salt Lake City: Shadow Mountain and Mormon Tabernacle Choir. 52091978
- 2004: with Millet, Robert L. Draw Near Unto Me: Daily Reflections on the Doctrine and Covenants. Salt Lake City: Deseret Book Company. OCLC: 55077577
- 2005: with Millet, Robert L. A lamp unto my feet : daily reflections on the Old Testament. Salt Lake City: Deseret Book Company. OCLC: 60743151
- 2005: with Hart, Craig; Walton, Elaine; Dollahite, David Dollahite; editors. Helping and Healing Our Families. Salt Lake City: Deseret Book Company. OCLC: 60596125
- 2006: with Staheli, Don H. The Healer’s Art: Faith and the Healing Power of Jesus Christ. Salt Lake City: Deseret Book Company. OCLC: 66392881
- 2006: Come, listen to a prophet's voice : daily counsel and inspiration from Latter-day prophets. Salt Lake City: Deseret Book Company. OCLC: 70251170
- 2007: with Newel, Karmel. A Christmas Treasury for Latter-day Saint Families. Salt Lake City: Deseret Book Company. OCLC: 70251170
- 2008: Let Him Ask of God: Daily Wisdom from the Life and Teachings of Joseph Smith. OCLC: 231745600
- 2009: with Newel, Karmel. I Heard the Bells on Christmas Day. Salt Lake City: Shadow Mountain. OCLC: 320622170
- 2010: He Shall Fulfill All of His Promises. Salt Lake City: Deseret Book Company. OCLC: 631744599
- 2012: as editor. Virtue and the abundant life : talks from the BYU Religious Education and Wheatley Institution Symposium. Salt Lake City: Deseret Book Company. OCLC: 768417901
- 2013: The Gospel of Second Chances. Salt Lake City: Deseret Book Company. OCLC: 1083449011
- 2015: with Black, Susan Easton and Woodger, Mary Jane. Men of character : profiles of 100 prominent LDS men. American Fork, Utah: Covenant Communications. OCLC: 872425514
- 2016: Celebrating Music and the spoken word : 25 years of inspirational spoken words. American Fork, Utah: Covenant Communications. OCLC: 944029641
- 2017: This Day and Always. Salt Lake City: Deseret Book Company. OCLC: 1040685470
- 2017: May Peace Be With You : Messages from the Spoken Word. Salt Lake City: Deseret Book. OCLC: 1083444377
- 2018: with Staheli, Don H. Habits of Holy Men. Salt Lake City: Deseret Book Company. OCLC: 1021062134
- 2018: with Woodger, Mary Jane. Blessed: The Beatitudes and the Christlike Life. American Fork, Utah: Covenant Communications. OCLC: 1079910834
- 2021: with Alford, Kenneth L. and Baugh, Alexander L., eds. Latter-day Saints in Washington, DC : history, people, and places. Provo, Utah: Brigham Young University, Religious Studies Center; Salt Lake City: Deseret Book Company. OCLC: 1200833632
- 2021: with Woodger, Mary Jane. Gifted : spiritual gifts and the Christlike life. Brigham City, Utah: Walnut Springs Press. OCLC: 1227101487

Media offices
Preceded by J. Spencer Kinard	Narrator, Music and the Spoken Word; October 1990–present	Succeeded by Derrick Porter
