= South Surrey Park =

Park in Melbourne, Australia

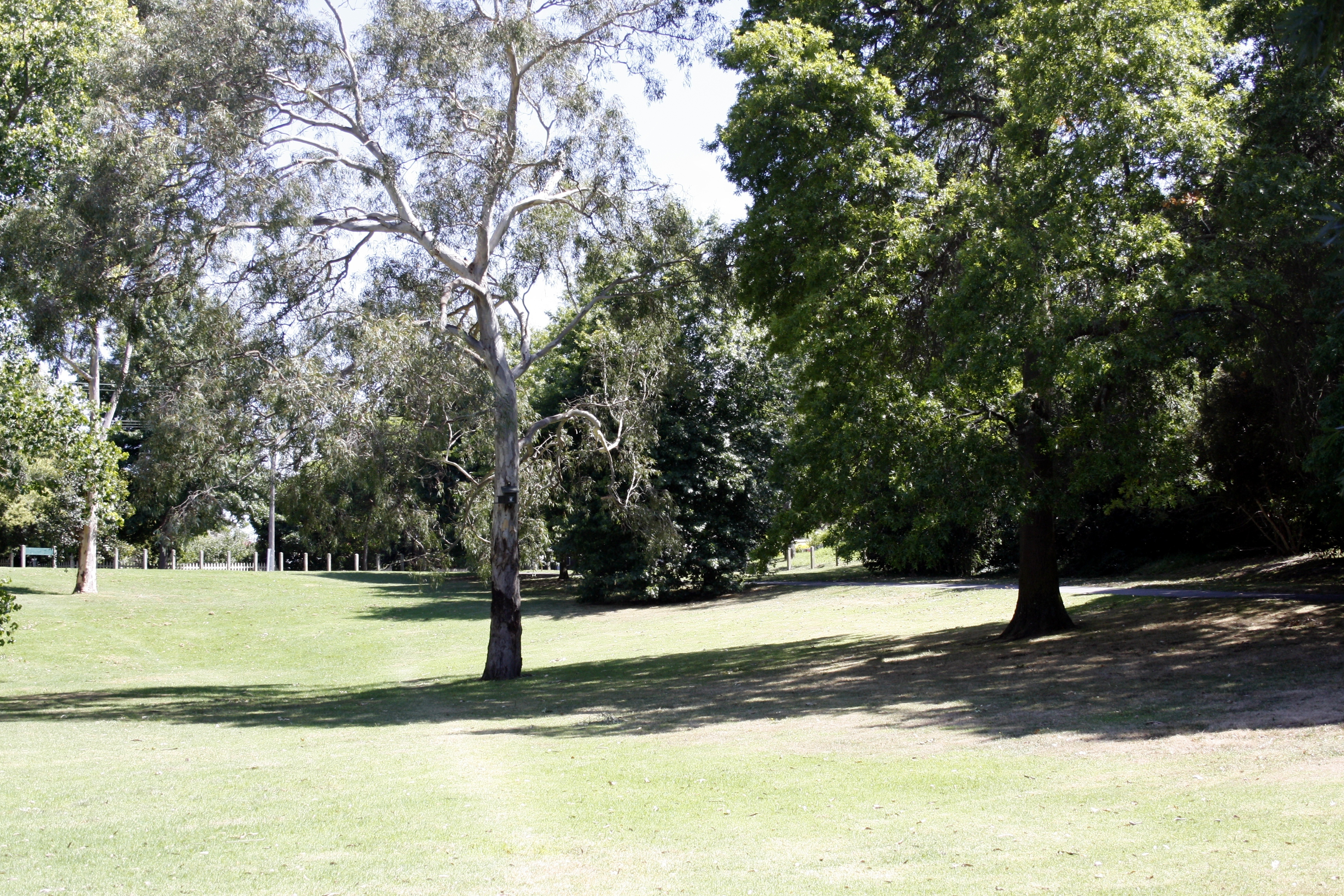
- Interactive map of South Surrey Park
- Location: Melbourne, Australia
- Coordinates: 37.8340106°S 145.092495°E
- Opened: 1937
- Operator: City of Boroondara
- Public transit: Route 70 tram

South Surrey Park is a park in Melbourne, Australia, located in the suburb of Surrey Hills. The park is progressively being replanted with indigenous native species. It is currently maintained by the City of Boroondara and the Friends of South Surrey Park.

South Surrey Park follows the course of Back Creek from Union Road in the north to Riversdale Road in the South. There are well-graded walking paths throughout the park, and a children's playground adjacent to Verdun Street.

== History ==
The park was formed on land owned by Mr W. Kleinert, a coachbuilder and blacksmith of 34 Union Road.

A footbridge across the creek in the park was opened with ceremony in 1937 by the Governor of Victoria, Sir Winston Duggan. The footbridge partially collapsed in the 1990s and was rebuilt using only some new material, giving it a mish-mash appearance today.
