= Richard L. Evans =

American Latter Day Saint writers and apostle; radio producer and announcer (1906–1971)

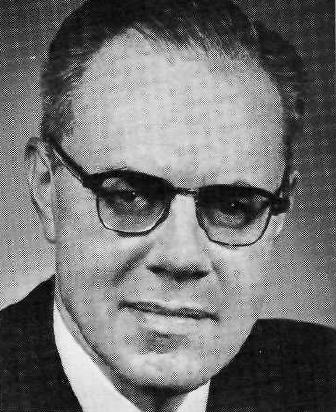

Quorum of the Twelve Apostles
- October 8, 1953 – November 1, 1971
- Called by: David O. McKay

LDS Church Apostle
- October 8, 1953 – November 1, 1971
- Called by: David O. McKay
- Reason: Death of Albert E. Bowen
- Reorganization at end of term: Marvin J. Ashton ordained

First Council of the Seventy
- October 7, 1938 – October 8, 1953
- Called by: Heber J. Grant
- End reason: Called to the Quorum of the Twelve Apostles

Personal details
- Born: Richard Louis Evans; March 23, 1906; Salt Lake City, Utah, U.S.
- Died: November 1, 1971 (aged 65); Salt Lake City, Utah, U.S.
- Resting place: Salt Lake City Cemetery; 40°46′37.92″N 111°51′28.8″W
- Spouse(s): Alice Ruth Thornley
- Children: 4 sons

Richard Louis Evans (March 23, 1906 – November 1, 1971) was a member of the Quorum of the Twelve Apostles of the Church of Jesus Christ of Latter-day Saints (LDS Church) (1953–71); the president of Rotary International (1966–67); and the writer, producer, and announcer of Music and the Spoken Word (1929–71).

== Biography ==
Evans was born in Salt Lake City, Utah. In the late 1920s, he served as a missionary for the LDS Church in the United Kingdom. While on his mission, Evans served as associate editor of the Millennial Star, a periodical published by the mission. He received bachelor's and master's degrees from the University of Utah. There, he joined Pi Kappa Alpha.

His master's degree was in economics. Over the years he served on the boards of directors of several companies.

In the late 1920s, he took a job with KSL radio as an announcer and script writer. He was also employed as the managing editor of the Improvement Era starting in 1936. He worked with the Era for 30 years and eventually became its senior editor. He was also closely involved with the changes that led to the replacement of the Improvement Era with the Ensign, New Era and Friend in 1971.

In 1937, Evans' book A Century of "Mormonism" in Great Britain was published with a copyright by Heber J. Grant, as trustee-in-trust for LDS Church. Evans also served for a time as the president of the Temple Square Mission.

Evans may have been best known as the announcer for the weekly Mormon Tabernacle Choir radio broadcast, Music and the Spoken Word: every week, he wrote, produced, and announced the radio broadcasts, including a short inspirational message. His involvement in these weekly broadcasts spanned from its inception in 1929 until his death in 1971.

Evans' voice was familiar to Latter-day Saints as the narrator of various church productions, most notably Man's Search for Happiness. He also introduced the Salt Lake City choir's contribution to Bing Crosby's annual "Christmas Sing with Bing" radio broadcasts during the 1950s, and is heard on the 1956 Decca LP of the same name, which featured the previous year's "Christmas Sing" edition.

Evans served as president of the University of Utah alumni association for three terms and as a member of its board for 12 years. He also served for a time as a member of the Utah State Board of Higher Education.

Evans first became a church general authority in 1938 when he was called as a member of the First Council of the Seventy. Evans was ordained an apostle on October 8, 1953 by David O. McKay, following the death of Albert E. Bowen.

Evans was the last apostle in the Church to have facial hair while in the office, wearing a neatly trimmed mustache until the mid-1960s.

Evans died at age 65 on November 1, 1971. The vacancy in the Quorum of the Twelve Apostles from his death was filled by Marvin J. Ashton. Evans was buried at Salt Lake City Cemetery.

Known for his ability to reach across religious differences, the Richard L. Evans Chair of Religious Understanding at Brigham Young University was created in his honor on November 1, 1972

Grave marker of Richard L. Evans
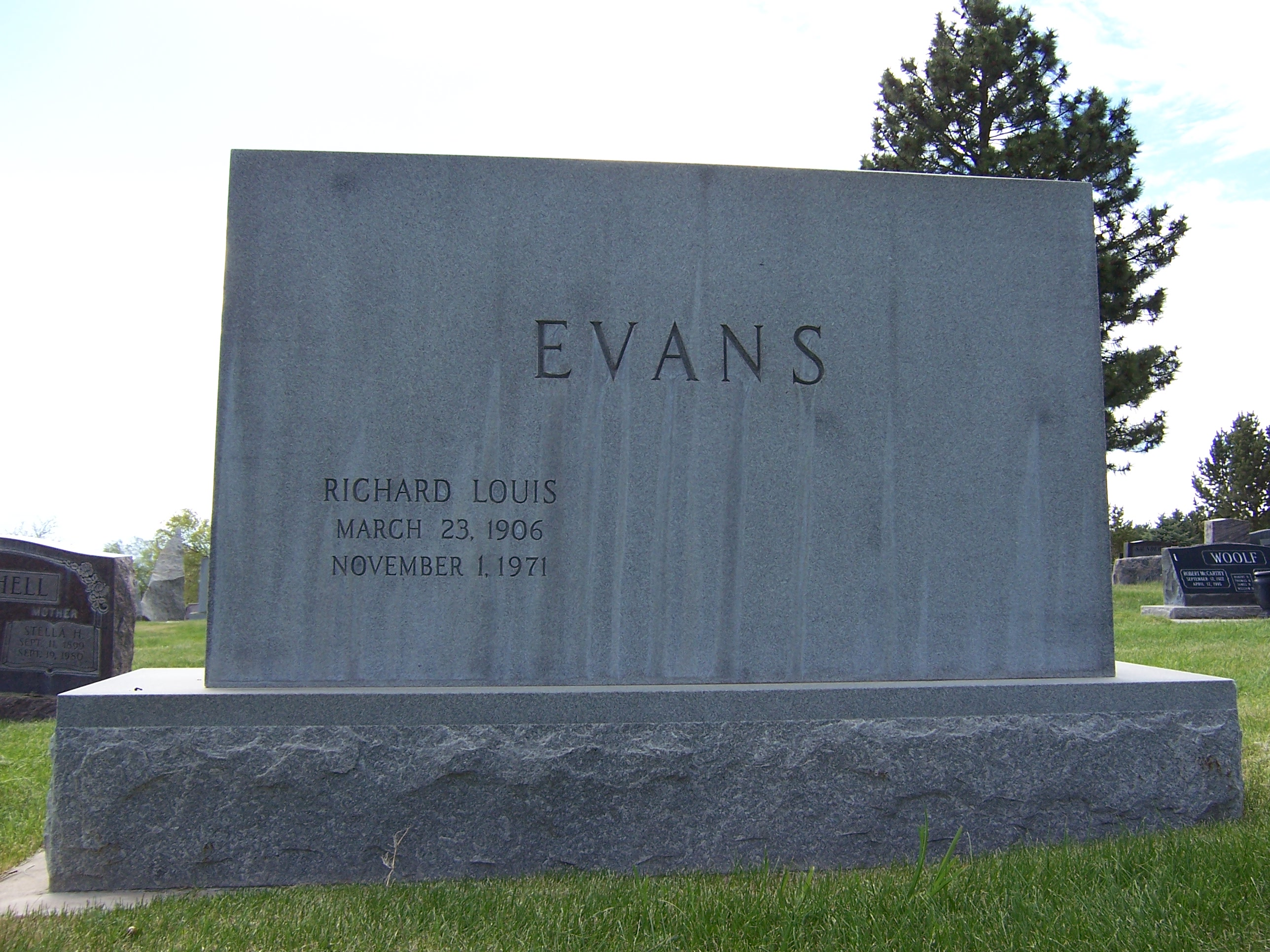
front

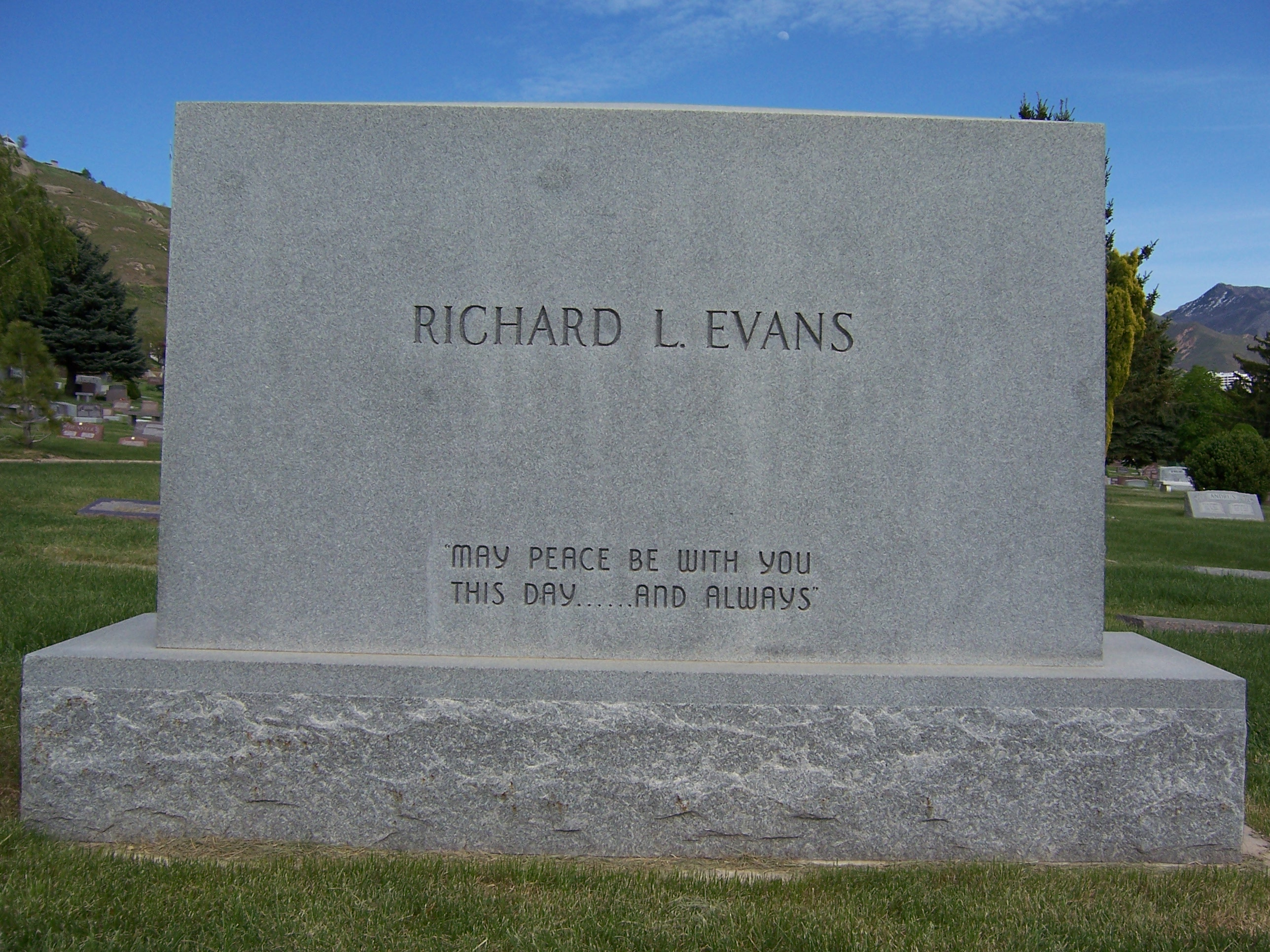
back

== Published works ==
- Evans, Richard L. (1937). A century of "Mormonism" in Great Britain. Salt Lake City: Deseret News Press. LCCN 38030638. OCLC 4322064.
- —— (1940). Unto the Hills. New York, London: Harper & Brothers. LCCN 40008173. OCLC 3189422.
- —— (1942). This day...and always. Harper & Brothers. LCCN 42050833. OCLC 3189434.
- —— (1945). ...and "The Spoken Word". Harper & Brothers. LCCN 45006083. OCLC 1439410.
- —— (1949). At this same hour. Harper & Brothers. LCCN 49009729. OCLC 1439435.
- —— (1952). Tonic for our times. Harper & Brothers. LCCN 52012774. OCLC 444780.
- —— (1955). From the crossroads. Harper & Brothers. LCCN 55009688. OCLC 3068520.
- Richards, LeGrand; et al. (1955). The Ten Commandments today: a discussion of the decalog. Salt Lake City: Deseret Book. OCLC 55056948.
- Evans, Richard L. (1957). The Everlasting Things. Harper & Brothers. LCCN 57010532. OCLC 2489723.
- —— (1959). From within these walls. Harper & Brothers. LCCN 59014531. OCLC 1245208.
- —— (1961). May peace be with you. Harper & Brothers. LCCN 61013283. OCLC 13961602.
- —— (1963). Faith in the future. New York: Harper & Row. LCCN 63021589. OCLC 2503657.
- —— (1966). Faith, Peace and Purpose. Cleveland: World Publishing Corporation. LCCN 66025880. OCLC 914294.
- —— (1966). Thoughts for 100 Days Vol. I. Salt Lake City: Publishers Press. LCCN 86220105. OCLC 3724643.
- —— (1967). An Open Door (Vol. II Thoughts for 100 Days). Publishers Press. OCLC 22013438.
- —— (1968). An Open Road (Vol. III Thoughts for 100 Days). Publishers Press.
- —— (1970). Thoughts for 100 Days Vol. IV. Publishers Press.
- —— (1972). Thoughts for 100 Days Vol. V. Publishers Press.
- —— (1984) [1937]. A century of "Mormonism" in Great Britain. Publishers Press. ISBN 978-0-916095-07-9. OCLC 11642406.
- —— (1984) [1971]. Richard Evans' quote book. Publishers Press. LCCN 86186298. OCLC 13960823.
- ——; Kinard, J. Spencer; Newell, Lloyd D. (2003). Messages from Music and the Spoken Word. Salt Lake City: Shadow Mountain. ISBN 978-1-57008-961-9. LCCN 2003008844. OCLC 52091978.

== Notes ==
Media offices
Preceded by Ted Kimball	Announcer, Music and the Spoken Word; June, 1930 – October, 1971	Succeeded by J. Spencer Kinard
The Church of Jesus Christ of Latter-day Saints titles
Preceded by Adam S. Bennion	Quorum of the Twelve Apostles; October 8, 1953 – November 1, 1971	Succeeded by George Q. Morris
Non-profit organization positions
Preceded by C. P. H. Teenstra	President of Rotary International; 1966–1967	Succeeded by Luther H. Hodges
