= Lorin F. Wheelwright =

Lorin Wheelwright
- Born: Lorin Farrar Wheelwright; December 20, 1909; Ogden, Utah, U.S.
- Died: November 4, 1987 (aged 77); Provo, Utah, U.S.
- Spouse: Ila Eugenia Spilsbury
- Children: 4
- Relatives: D. Sterling Wheelwright (brother)

Academic background
- Education: University of Chicago (MA); Columbia University (PhD)

Academic work
- Discipline: Music education
- Sub-discipline: Music education Mormon music
- Institutions: Branch Agricultural College; Salt Lake City School District; Brigham Young University

Lorin Farrar Wheelwright (December 20, 1909 – November 4, 1987) was an American Latter-day Saint hymnwriter, composer, musical instructor and educator.

== Early life and education ==
Wheelwright was the son of David S. Wheelwright and Valborg Rasmussen. His mother was an immigrant from Denmark. She immigrated at age 13 after having become a member of the Church of Jesus Christ of Latter-day Saints, with her elder brother. Valborg Rasmussen Wheelwright was a graduate of Ellis Shipp's School of Obstetrics. She and David Wheelwright served as missionaries in Denmark for the Church of Jesus Christ of Latter-day Saints in 1904 and 1905. Valborg Wheelwright was active in the Republican Party and ran unsuccessfully for the Utah State Legislature.

Wheelwright was the younger brother of D. Sterling Wheelwright, who was one of his early music teachers. He was raised in a Latter-day Saint home where singing hymns was common. While still young he was a Sunday School pianist, and then ward choir pianist in the Ogden 12th Ward of the Church of Jesus Christ of Latter-day Saints (LDS Church).

Wheelwright studied under Edward P. Kimball and Alexander Schreiner at the University of Utah. He had begun his musical studies at the McCune School of Music. He then studied at Columbia University and the Juilliard School of Music. He received a master's degree from the University of Chicago and a Ph.D. from Columbia University.

== Career ==
Wheelwright succeeded J. Spencer Cornwall as the head of music education for the Salt Lake Public Schools. He also taught at Oswego Teachers College in New York. He was a professor at the Branch Agricultural College (now Southern Utah University) starting in 1933. For a time he served as the head of the Coordinating Council of Higher Education of Utah.

Wheelwright was involved in printing. He founded Pioneer Music Press in 1938. He remained president of that press until 1978. He was also the founding president of the Printing Industries of Utah in 1950. He also cofounded Wheelwright Lithography Company with his brother Max Wheelwright in 1956 and Wheelwright Press, Inc. in 1958. Wheelwright Press was mainly involved in publishing college and high school year books. Wheelwright served as president of the National Yearbook Association for some of the 1960s.

From 1956 until at least 1971 Wheelwright served as a member of the Sunday School General Board of the Church of Jesus Christ of Latter-day Saints. He also served for a time as associate editor of The Instructor, the Church's Sunday School magazine from 1956 until the consolidation of church magazines in 1971. Wheelwright was also for a time president of a BYU stake.

In 1967, Wheelwright became the dean of the BYU College of Fine Arts and Communications (Brigham Young University). In 1969, Wheelwright started the Mormon Arts Festival. In 1973, he was succeeded by Lael J. Woodbury as the dean and was made a special assistant to BYU President Dallin H. Oaks. He remained an assistant to Oaks until 1976. He also served as chairman of BYU's centennial celebration.

Among the hymns that Wheelwright wrote are "O Love That Glorifies the Son", "Help Me Teach With Inspiration" and "Oh, May My Soul Commune with Thee". He also wrote the words and music to "Come, All Ye Saints and Sing His Praise", which is not in the 1985 English edition of the LDS Church hymnal but was in previous editions.

Wheelwright wrote the words and music of the two-part Christmas anthem "Star Bright" (Estrella de Luz) with words in English and Spanish, and accompaniment for guitar and keyboard.

Wheelwright also wrote "Mother I Love You", a song in the Primary Children's Songbook. He edited and published an autobiography of his mother.

== Personal life ==
Wheelwright and his wife, Ila Eugenia Spilsbury, had four children.

== Sources ==
- Lorin Farrar Wheelwright Papers, MSS 3164; 20th Century Western & Mormon Manuscripts; L. Tom Perry Special Collections, Harold B. Lee Library, Brigham Young University.
