= Surrey Hills, Victoria =

Surrey Hills
- Suburb
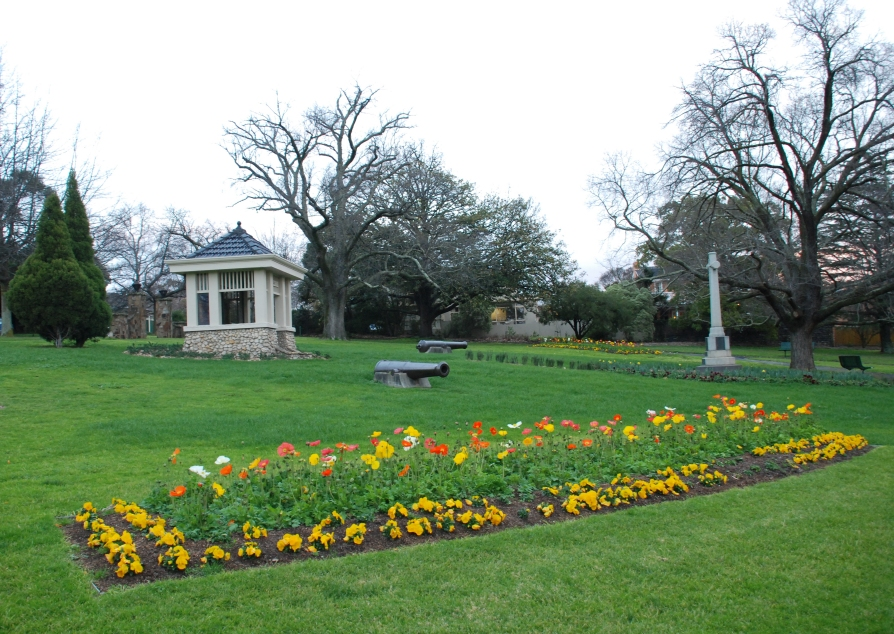
- Surrey Gardens, which lie within Surrey Hills

- Interactive map of Surrey Hills
- Coordinates: 37.830°S 145.106°E
- Country: Australia
- State: Victoria
- City: Melbourne
- LGAs: City of Boroondara; City of Whitehorse
- Location: 11 km (6.8 mi) from Melbourne

Government
  - State electorates: Box Hill; Hawthorn; Kew
  - Federal divisions: Menzies; Kooyong

Area
  - Total: 4.4 km^{2} (1.7 sq mi)
- Elevation: 110 m (360 ft)

Population
  - Total: 13,655 (SAL 2021)
- Postcode: 3127
Suburbs around Surrey Hills
Balwyn	Mont Albert	Mont Albert
Canterbury	Surrey Hills	Box Hill South
Camberwell	Camberwell	Burwood

Surrey Hills is a suburb of Melbourne, Victoria, Australia, 11 km east of Melbourne's Central Business District, located within the Cities of Boroondara and Whitehorse local government areas. Surrey Hills recorded a population of 13,655 at the 2021 census.

Surrey Hills was settled in the late 19th century and evolved with slightly smaller blocks and slightly simpler housing than its neighbour Canterbury. Most of Surrey Hills' streets are lined with now-mature European trees, mostly plane and pin oak.

It is bordered by Elgar Road in the east, Riversdale Road in the south, Highfield Road in the west and Whitehorse Road in the north.

== History ==
The Surrey Hills area was acquired from the Crown by Henry Elgar, as part of his Special Survey purchase in 1841.

The Surrey Hills area was first developed by a Real Estate consortia, following the extension of the railway line from Camberwell to Lilydale in 1882. Surrey Hills Post Office opened on 1 October 1884. Housing estates were laid out and lovely period homes built in either brick or weatherboard, with most designs being influenced by the Victorian, Federation, and Edwardian architectural styles. The streets were planted mainly with avenues of Pin Oak and Plane trees, which are now mature and offer a pleasant shady vista.

=== Naming of streets ===
The streets have impressive names such as Empress, Kingston, Surrey, Balmoral, Leopold, Windsor, Albert and Wolseley. Surrey Hills contains both the 'English Counties District', which is a small area between Canterbury and Riversdale Roads, where the streets are named after English Counties, including Norfolk, Durham, Kent, Middlesex, Essex, and Suffolk roads and the 'Chatham Precinct', which is located between Canterbury, Union, Mont Albert and Chatham roads. The latter streets are named after English places including Croydon, Guildford, and Surrey; and Sir Garnet Road was named in honour of Garnet Wolseley, 1st Viscount Wolseley.

=== Retail development ===
The area was considered too distant from the nearest shopping districts: Camberwell to the west and Box Hill to the east. The economic depression of the 1890s brought development to a halt and the next major phase of suburban development didn't take place until after the First World War.

During the 1990s, the last bank branch in the Union Road shopping strip closed, which caused some concern within both the local community and local traders. On 24 February 2003, the Surrey Hills Community Bank, a community bank branch of Bendigo Bank, opened for business in Union Road.

=== Heritage listing ===
The following place in Surrey Hills is listed on the Victorian Heritage Register:

- Jefferies house, 7 Warwick Avenue

== Education ==
The suburb has three local primary schools; Surrey Hills Primary, Chatham Primary School, and Our Lady's of Perpetual Succour. Surrey Hills' Central Business District is relatively small, consisting of a 300-metre (980 ft) strip of shops along Union Road.

== Transport ==
The neighbourhood centre formerly featured Surrey Hills railway station, on the Belgrave and Lilydale railway lines. Heading out from Melbourne's CBD, Union Road was the first railway level crossing on the Belgrave/Lilydale train line until 2023, when the line was lowered as part of the Level Crossing Removal Project. As part of this work, Surrey Hills and Mont Albert stations were replaced by Union railway station, slightly further northeast and just into Mont Albert. Surrey Hills also has Chatham railway station, north of Canterbury Road, between Stanley Terrace and Junction Road. Chatham Station can be accessed from the north by laneways between houses, beginning near the Mont Albert Road General Store, then continuing south along the Canterbury Sports Ground pathway. Most working residents of Surrey Hills commute to Melbourne either by car or train. To reach a safe bicycle path for the city commute, cyclists must travel south to the Gardiners Creek Trail or north to the Yarra River Trail, via the Outer Circle Trail. A bike lane is located on Mont Albert Road.

To the north, Surrey Hills is also serviced by the route 109 tram, which continues from Port Melbourne, along Collins Street, along Whitehorse Rd, to Box Hill and in the south, the route 70 tram travels along Riversdale Road from the city to the Wattle Park terminus at the Elgar Road junction. Canterbury Road between Station Street, Box Hill and Union Road, Surrey Hills is the only east–west major road not served by any public transport, although historically the road was served by busses until the 1960s. There are a few remaining bus stop seats on Canterbury Road, but the nearest operating public transport is via Riversdale Road to the South trams, Mont Albert Station to the north, by train, Union Road, via bus, and Surrey Hills station, by train, to the west. These points all represent approximately two kilometres (one mile) from the peak of Surrey Hills, near the position of the large telecommunication towers on the corner of Canterbury Road and Harding Street.

== Parks and gardens ==
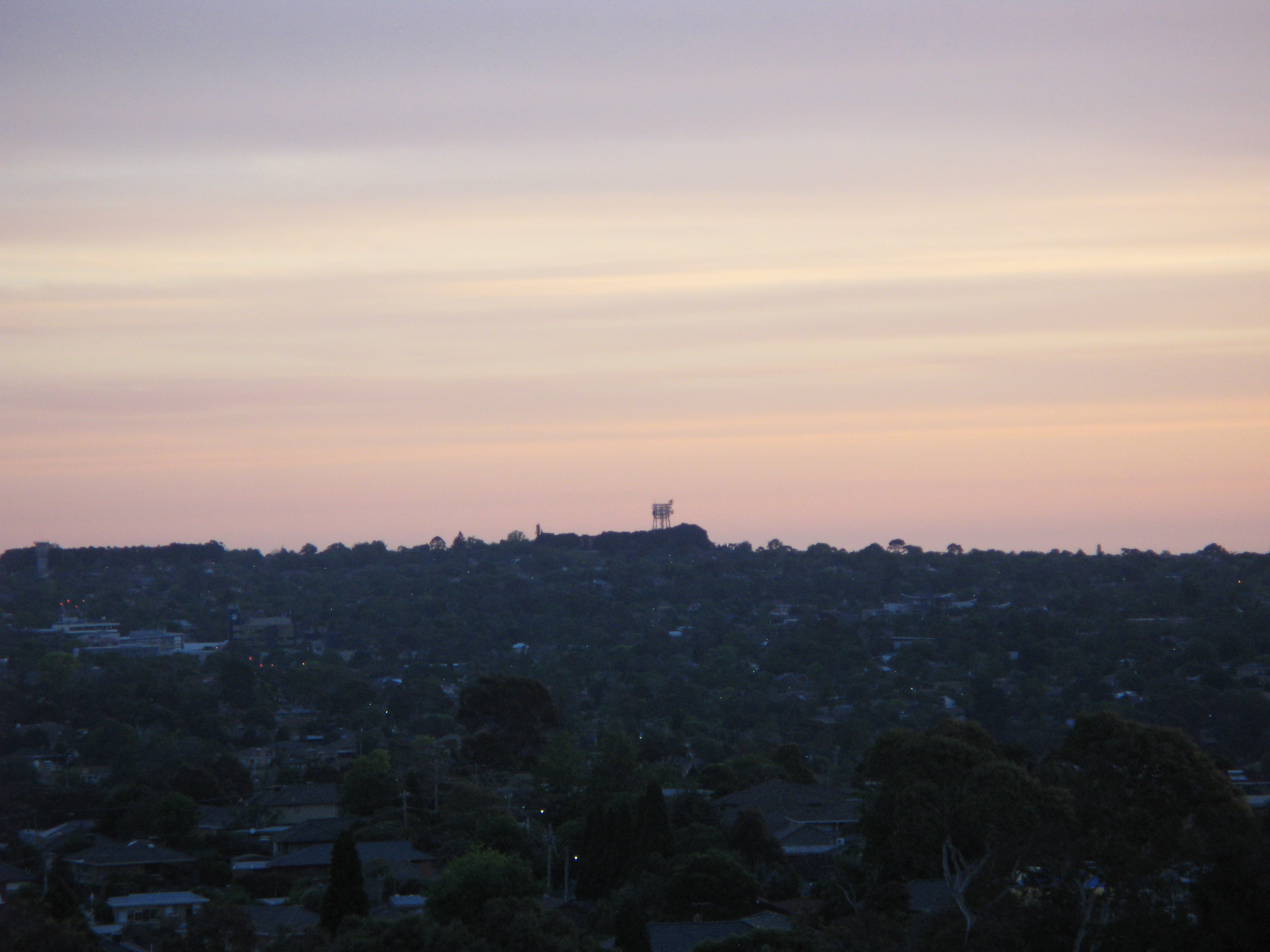
Surrey Hills viewed from Doncaster Hill, showing the communications tower on Canterbury Road

The major parks and gardens in Surrey Hills are Surrey Gardens and South Surrey Park. Surrey Hills is also adjacent to Wattle Park, which is just across Riversdale Road to the south, in Burwood.

== Sport ==
Canterbury Sports Ground is located in the north-west of the suburb and has 3 sporting clubs. It is the home ground of the Australian Rules Football club, Canterbury 'Cobras', who currently compete in the Victorian Amateur Football Association; the Canterbury Cricket Club, which plays on a turf wicket in the Eastern Cricket Association (ECA) and the Canterbury Tennis Club, which has its own clubhouse and 4 en-tou-cas courts.

Surrey Park (located on the intersection of Canterbury Road and Elgar Road) is also home to local football and cricket teams. It is the home of the Surrey Park Football Club which consists of men's and women's teams which play both at senior and junior levels. The senior clubs compete in the Eastern Football League, while the junior clubs play in the Yarra Junior Football League (YJFL). The Surrey Hills Cricket Club also play at this reserve; competing in the Eastern Cricket Association (ECA) both at senior and junior levels.

== See also ==
- City of Box Hill – Surrey Hills was previously within this former local government area.
- City of Camberwell – Surrey Hills was previously within this former local government area.
