= D. Sterling Wheelwright =

D. Sterling Wheelwright (June 27, 1906 – May 1965) was an assistant conductor of the Mormon Tabernacle Choir under J. Spencer Cornwall. He was the older brother of Lorin F. Wheelwright.

In 1925, Wheelwright traveled from the United States to Europe as a missionary for the Church of Jesus Christ of Latter-day Saints (LDS Church). His destination was Germany, but he became ill, was delayed in Copenhagen and never made it to Germany. He returned home and began to study music at Northwestern University. He assisted the missionary efforts in Chicago as much as he could.

Wheelwright was assistant conductor of the Mormon Tabernacle Choir from 1926 to 1938. He also served as a member of the Deseret Sunday School Union General Board and as the secretary to the LDS Church's Music Committee.
