= Edward P. Kimball =

American musician and organist of the Mormon Tabernacle Choir (1882–1937)

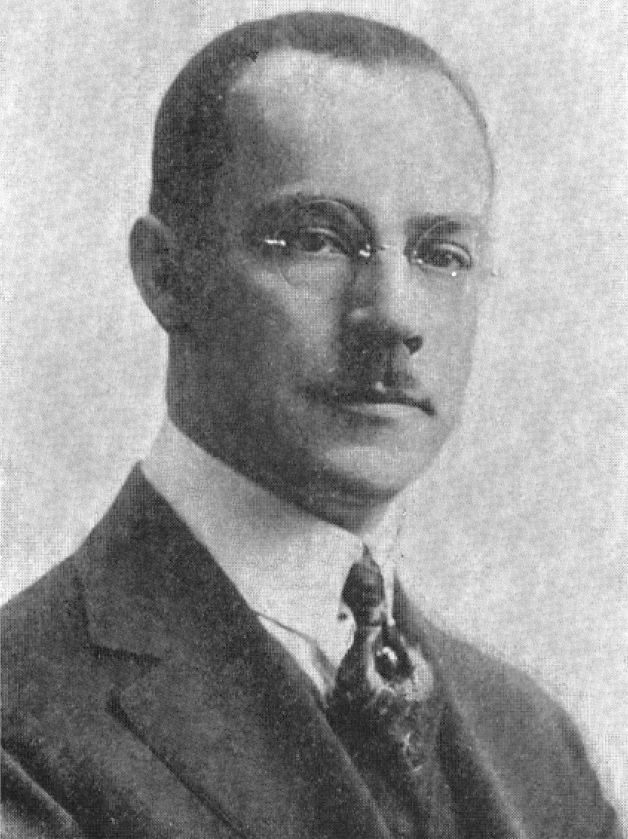

Personal details
- Born: Edward Partridge Kimball; June 2, 1882; Salt Lake City, Utah Territory, United States
- Died: March 15, 1937 (aged 54); District Of Columbia, United States
- Resting place: Salt Lake City Cemetery
- Known For: Organist or assistant organist of the Mormon Tabernacle Choir from 1905 to 1937
- Spouse(s): Hazel Y. Beaties
- Children: 3, incl. Ted Kimball
- Parents: Albert K. Kimball, Harriet Partridge

Edward Partridge Kimball (June 2, 1882 – March 15, 1937) was an American organist of the Mormon Tabernacle Choir and a Latter-day Saint hymn writer.

In 1898, Kimball was appointed music teacher at the Beaver Branch of Brigham Young Academy. From April 1902 to April 1906, Kimball served as a missionary for the Church of Jesus Christ of Latter-day Saints (LDS Church) in Germany.

Kimball was either the organist or assistant organist of the Mormon Tabernacle Choir from 1905 to 1937. Kimball was the organist when Music and the Spoken Word began. His son, Ted Kimball, was the first announcer for the show.

Kimball wrote the words to "God Loved Us, So He Sent His Son" and the music to "Great God, To Thee My Evening Song" and "The Wintry Day Descending to a Close", all of which are in the 1985 English language edition of the LDS Church hymnal.

Kimball took a leave from his active service as a Tabernacle organist to serve as president of the LDS Church's German–Austrian Mission.

In 1933, Kimball was appointed organist and director of the church's Bureau of Information in Washington, D. C., where he also served as a lecturer and guide. While in this role, Kimball died following a brief illness in 1937.
