= James H. Wallis =

James Hearknett Wallis (1861–1940) was a Latter-day Saint hymnwriter, editor and Patriarch. He was the author of the hymn "Come, Ye Children of The Lord".

Wallis was born on 13 April 1861 in London, England. His parents were James Wallis and Jane Sarah Booth. Wallis joined The Church of Jesus Christ of Latter-day Saints (LDS Church) in 1877 and emigrated to the United States in 1881, settling in Utah Territory.

In 1879, James was appointed as the president of the Liverpool Young Men's Mutual Improvement Association, which was one of the first to be established in Europe.

Wallis was involved in printing and publishing. He was trained while working on the Millennial Star under William L. Davies. In Vol. 95, no. 20 of the Star Wallis published an article on the history of the magazine entitled "The Star and Its Prophesied Headquarters". At that point he was serving as the associate editor of the magazine.

In 1917, Wallis became the editor of the Vernal Express in Vernal, Utah. Wallis bought this paper in 1921. His son William B. Wallis, his grandson Jack R. Wallis and his great-grandson Steven R. Wallis continued running the paper until Steven's death in 2007. Prior to coming to Vernal, Wallis had served as editor of the paper that by 1914 was entitled the Paris Post being published in Paris, Idaho. In total Wallis was editor or publisher of 22 different papers at various locations in Utah and Idaho.

In 1927, Wallis became the bishop of the LDS Church's Vernal 1st Ward. While in this position he oversaw the construction of a chapel for the ward. In 1931, Wallis was called as traveling patriarch for the British Mission, and was the first patriarch authorized to give patriarchal blessings in Britain since the 1840s, when Peter Melling and John Albertson served as patriarchs. While in England, Wallis gave approximately 1300 patriarchal blessings. He finished this assignment in 1933 and returned to the United States. He then served as patriarch of the Emigration Stake on the east side of Salt Lake City until his death in 1940. In 1934 Wallis fulfilled a six-month assignment to go to the Canadian Mission, headquartered in Toronto, and give patriarchal blessings to the members living in that mission's boundaries. Members of The Church of Jesus Christ of Latter-day Saints there were glad to get these blessings.

Wallis wrote several poems, many of which were published in 1883.
