= Abide with Me, 'Tis Eventide =

19th-century American Christian hymn

- Hymn
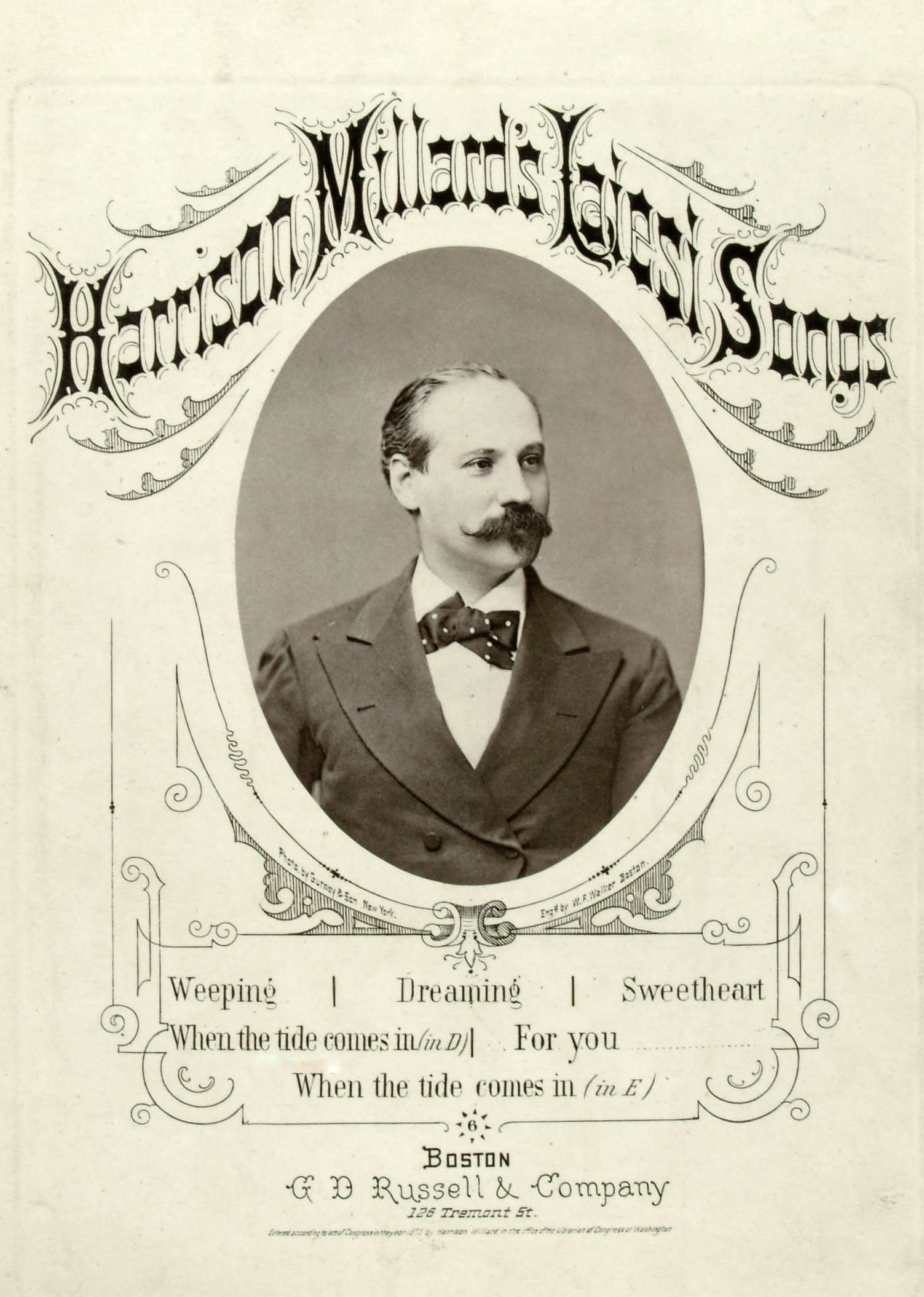
- Harrison Millard
- Text: by Martin Lowrie Hofford
- Meter: 8.6.8.6.D
- Melody: "Welcome Guest" by Harrison Millard
- Composed: 1870

"Abide with Me, 'Tis Eventide" is a 19th-century American Christian hymn written by Martin Lowrie Hofford (lyrics) and Harrison Millard in 1870 (music). The lyrics and music to the hymn were heavily influenced by the American Civil War.

== Influence ==
The hymn appears as number 46 in the Seventh-day Adventist Hymnal and number 165 of the hymnbook of The Church of Jesus Christ of Latter-day Saints.

It has also been published in the 1978 Hymns of Praise edited by Reuel Lemmons; the 1971 Songs of the Church and the 1990 Songs of the Church 21st Century Edition both edited by Alton H. Howard; both the 1978 and 1983 Church Gospel Songs and Hymns edited by V. E. Howard; the 1992 Praise for the Lord edited by John P. Wiegand; the 2007 Sacred Songs of the Church edited by William D. Jeffcoat and the 2009 Favorite Songs of the Church edited by Robert J. Taylor Jr.
