= Music & the Spoken Word =

American radio and television program

- Genre: Worship music; Classical music
- Running time: 28 minutes
- Country of origin: United States
- Language: English
- Home station: KSL NewsRadio (radio); KSL-TV (television)
- Syndicates: NBC Radio (1929-1932), CBS Radio (1932-2005), direct syndication (2005-present)
- Starring: The Tabernacle Choir at Temple Square; Orchestra at Temple Square
- Announcer: Ted Kimball (1929–1930); Richard L. Evans (1930–1971); Alan Jensen (1971–1972); J. Spencer Kinard (1972–1990); Lloyd D. Newell (1990–2024); Derrick Porter (2024–present)
- Created by: Earl J. Glade
- Written by: Joni Hilton; Luke Howard; Roger Miller; Lloyd D. Newell; Heidi S. Swinton; Derrick Porter
- Directed by: Lynn Clayson; Wendy Crossman; Michael Hunter; Robert O. Morton; Lee Wessman; Nathan K. Wright
- Produced by: Edward J. Payne; Eldon Griffin
- Recording studio: Salt Lake Tabernacle and Conference Center, Salt Lake City, Utah, U.S.
- Original release: July 15, 1929 (radio); October 1949 (television); – present
- No. of episodes: 5,070 (as of November 15, 2026)
- Audio format: Stereophonic sound
- Opening theme: "Gently Raise the Sacred Strain"
- Other themes: "As the Dew from Heaven Distilling"
- Ending theme: "God Be with You Till We Meet Again"
- Website: musicandthespokenword.com

Music & the Spoken Word is a religious radio and television series. Broadcast weekly from the Salt Lake Tabernacle in Salt Lake City, Utah, the program primarily features performances of music by Tabernacle Choir (Choir)—often accompanied by the Salt Lake Tabernacle organ and the Orchestra at Temple Square. The program also includes spiritual messages and passages related to a specific episode's theme (the "spoken word"), presented by Derrick Porter.

Music & the Spoken Word has been broadcast continually on the Salt Lake City-based KSL radio since 1929, making it the world's longest-running national radio program carried continuously on a network. The program made its television debut in October 1949, and is currently the longest-running non-news program on television. It has received two Peabody Awards, and was inducted into the National Association of Broadcasters Broadcasting Hall of Fame in 2004, and the National Radio Hall of Fame in 2010.

Originally airing on NBC Radio, the radio program was distributed by the CBS Radio Network from 1932 until 2005. Its flagship station is KSL, which is owned by Bonneville International, a division of the Church of Jesus Christ of Latter-day Saints (LDS Church). KSL, a former CBS Radio affiliate, switched to ABC Radio in 2005. The program is also heard on Sunday mornings over 50,000 watt KOA radio from Denver, also a former CBS Radio affiliate. In addition, it is currently broadcast by over 2,000 television and radio stations worldwide, including Bonneville International-owned KOIT-FM in San Francisco, KIRO-FM in Seattle-Tacoma, and KTAR-AM-FM in Phoenix.

== History ==
The Choir's first network radio program, Music & the Spoken Word was first transmitted on July 15, 1929. The organ, choir, and announcer shared a single microphone that was attached to the ceiling of the tabernacle. The announcer stood on a ladder in order to speak into it. A telegraph was used to alert the sound engineer at KSL radio to start the broadcast. Anthony C. Lund was the director of the Choir for the first program, with Earl J. Glade, the general manager of KSL, as its director and producer.

Beginning in 1930, Richard L. Evans became the program's first regular host. Evans held this role until his death in 1971, when he was succeeded by J. Spencer Kinard. Lloyd D. Newell hosted the program from 1991 to 2024.

Newell, remarking on his Spoken Word messages, has said, "I can sincerely say that each one is carefully considered and lovingly written, and each is motivated by a genuine desire to share some timeless wisdom, an eternal truth, a principle that will lift and inspire."

In 2004, in conjunction with its 75th anniversary, Music & the Spoken Word was inducted into the National Association of Broadcasters' Radio Hall of Fame. It is one of only two radio programs to have been inducted, the other being the Grand Ole Opry.

The program was also inducted into the National Radio Hall of Fame in 2010.

Through early 2020, the program's continuous new weekly broadcasts led to it becoming the longest continuous weekly program in television and radio broadcasting history. The program has occasionally aired reruns when the Choir is on concert tours.

In March 2020, the Choir suspended activities due to the COVID-19 pandemic. As a result, Music & the Spoken Word went on hiatus and broadcast reruns. By April 2020, these reruns were augmented with new studio segments recorded in the Tabernacle by Newell with a skeleton crew.

In July 2021, the Choir announced that it would begin to resume operations. New episodes of Music & the Spoken Word officially resumed on October 24, 2021, originating from the LDS Church's Conference Center with no studio audience. Due to the Omicron variant, the Choir suspended operations again in December 2021, extending a pre-scheduled hiatus for the holiday season through March 2022. At the time, Music & the Spoken Word resumed broadcasts from the Salt Lake Tabernacle for the first time since March 2020.

On December 10, 2023, Newell announced he would depart his role with the Choir and Music & the Spoken Word in July 2024 to fill a role as a mission president. In March 2024, the First Presidency announced that Derrick Porter would become the new host, with Newell's final episode being on June 16, and Porter debuting on June 23.

== Broadcast ==
Each broadcast revolves around a specific theme which is usually based on a religious and uplifting topic which have included family, hope, faith, Christmas, patriotism, joy, peace, kindness, etc., and are usually broadly Christian in application.

=== Music ===
The Choir performs both sacred and secular pieces that correspond with the chosen message. In addition to hymns and sacred anthems, the Choir has performed Broadway songs, such as "Climb Ev'ry Mountain" from The Sound of Music, patriotic American songs, such as "America the Beautiful", as well as a wide range of other selections. The broadcast also regularly features an organ solo played by one of the tabernacle organists.

On some occasions, special guests will also perform with the choir during the broadcast. These guests have included Renée Fleming, Frederica von Stade, Sissel, The King's Singers, Maureen McGovern, and other well-known groups, musicians, news anchors, and actors.

==== Choir ====
The Grammy Award-winning Choir is a 360-voice choir that was founded in Utah in 1847, one month after the Mormon pioneers entered the Salt Lake Valley.

Called "America's Choir" by U.S. President Ronald Reagan, all members of the choir are volunteers and are not remunerated. The Choir is led by director Mack Wilberg.

In addition to Music and & Spoken Word, the Choir performs regularly throughout the year, including annual Christmas, Pioneer, and various other concerts, as well providing music for the LDS Church's general conference. The Choir has also been on national and international tours.

==== Orchestra ====
The Orchestra at Temple Square was created in 1999 in order to increase the aesthetic and musical quality of performances. The Orchestra frequently provides accompaniment for the weekly radio and TV broadcasts.

The Orchestra also undertakes its own concert season performing from standard orchestral literature, which has included Mahler's Symphony No. 4, the Firebird Suite by Stravinsky and Symphony No. 9 (from The New World) by Dvořák.

Like the Choir, the 110-member Orchestra is made up of volunteers, some of whom are also professional musicians.

==== Organ and organists ====
The Salt Lake Tabernacle organ is a very visible and notable part of the building. The original organ was made by Joseph Harris Ridges (1827–1914), a native of Australia, and contained seven hundred pipes. However, the number of pipes is now 11,623, making it one of the world's largest pipe organs. The current organ is largely the work of G. Donald Harrison of the former Aeolian-Skinner organ firm. It was completed in the late 1940s. The organ has undergone a few minor modifications since that time.

The organ is currently played by five main organists when accompanying the Choir. Richard Elliott, Andrew Unsworth, and Brian Mathias are full-time organists, while Linda Margetts and Joseph Peeples are part-time organists.

=== The "Spoken Word" ===
The program features inspirational messages, constituting the eponymous "Spoken Word". The original writer, producer, and announcer of the spoken portion of the broadcast was Richard L. Evans, who continued in that capacity for over forty years until his death in 1971. At that time the writing and announcing assignments were split, with a committee doing the writing. J. Spencer Kinard was the announcer from 1972 until he stepped down in 1990. Lloyd D. Newell served as the host of the program from 1991 to 2024, when he was succeeded by Derrick Porter. According to Newell, Gordon B. Hinckley, then a counselor in the LDS Church's First Presidency, instructed him that "each message should be an 'inspirational gem'", and that when writing the messages, he should consider "whether they would enlighten and inspire listeners and have an insight or perspective that is wide and interesting and encouraging."

=== International broadcasts ===
The program has been broadcast in other languages, with the opening sequence and Spoken Word segment either subtitled or dubbed in the respective language. On July 30, 2023, a pilot began for a dedicated Spanish-language edition of Music & the Spoken Word,: it contains the same performances as the English-language version, but uses a rotating cast of Spanish-language announcers and other imagery specific to Spanish culture.

== Performance venue ==
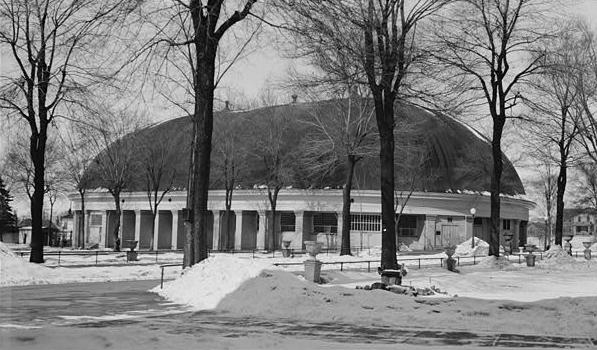
Tabernacle in 1937

The program is broadcast from the Salt Lake Tabernacle, more commonly called the Mormon Tabernacle. The dome-shaped building was built between 1864 and 1867 on the west center-line axis of the Salt Lake Temple and is located inside Temple Square. The overall seating capacity of the building (since its renovation) is 7,000, which includes the Choir area and balcony gallery. The central feature of the tabernacle is the large pipe organ.

During some periods with larger crowds, the performance moves to the LDS Conference Center.

== See also ==
- Latter-day Saints Channel—official LDS Church channel which rebroadcasts Music & the Spoken Word
- List of longest-running American television series
