= John Menzies Macfarlane =

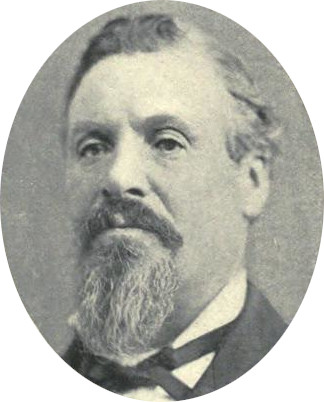
- Born: 11 October 1833; Stirling, Scotland
- Died: 4 June 1892 (aged 58); Utah Territory, United States
- Occupations: Hymn writer, militia, judge and academic
- Writing career
- Notable works: "Far, Far Away on Judea's Plains", "Dearest Children, God is Near You"

John Menzies Macfarlane (October 11, 1833 – June 4, 1892) was a Scottish-born Latter-day Saint hymnwriter, choir director and civic leader who spent most of his life in Utah Territory.

== Life ==
Macfarlane was born in Stirling, Scotland. He came to Utah Territory in the early 1850s and settled in Cedar City in 1853. In 1852, Macfarlane married Ann Chatterley. Multiple sources identified him as one of the many Iron County Militia men involved in the 1857 Mountain Meadows Massacre.

Macfarlane served as superintendent of schools from 1866 to 1868 for Iron County, Utah, and the leader of the choir in Cedar City which he took to St. George. Erastus Snow urged Macfarlane to move to St. George and start a choir there, which he did.

Besides leading the choir, Macfarlane served as a district judge and worked as a surveyor and a builder. In St. George, he was involved in founding an academy in 1888 that was the predecessor to Dixie State College of Utah.

Among Macfarlane's hymns are "Far, Far Away on Judea's Plains" and the music to "Dearest Children, God is Near You".
