= Surrey Gardens =

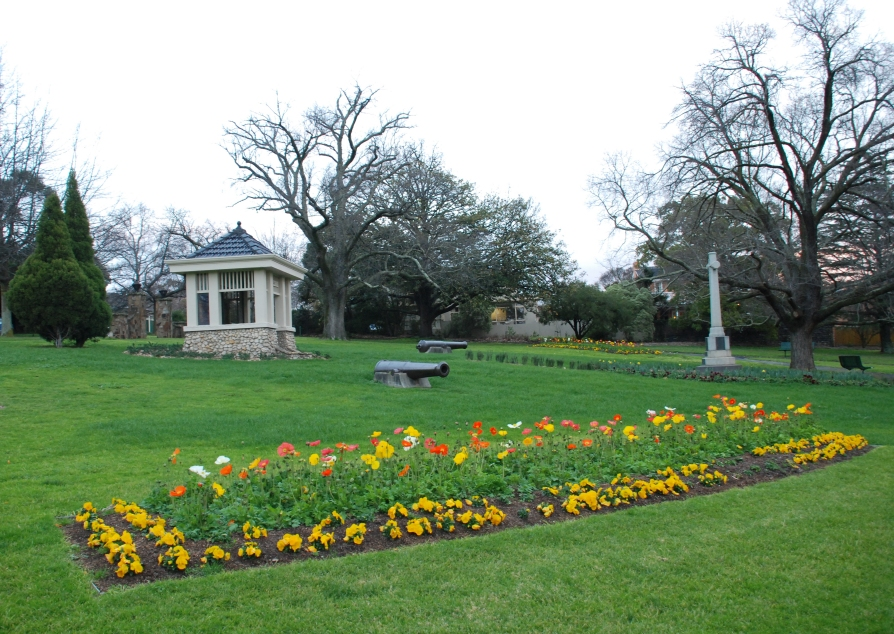
- Interactive map of Surrey Gardens
- Location: Melbourne, Australia
- Coordinates: 37.826897°S 145.095862°E
- Opened: 1907
- Operator: City of Boroondara
- Terrain: Landscaped gardens
- Public transit: Lilydale and Belgrave trains from Surrey Hills railway station Bus routes 612 and 766

Surrey Gardens is a park in Melbourne, Australia, located in the suburb of Surrey Hills. The park is situated high in Surrey Hills on sloping land from Union Road in the east to Norfolk Road in the west and contains many mature trees. It is maintained by the City of Boroondara.

== History ==
The Gardens were formed on 1.4 hectares of land purchased by the Shire of Boroondara (Camberwell) in 1903 and designated as a municipal reserve. In 1904, William Guilfoyle, designer of Melbourne's Royal Botanic Gardens suggested a plan that was later adopted. The garden was planted and opened in 1907.

The stone cross and war memorial shrine (cenotaph) were erected after World War I. The war memorial is reputed to be one of the first in Australia and was restored in 2007 for Anzac Day. It contains a rare Art Nouveau wood carved historic honour roll which was carved by one of Melbourne's pioneering wood carvers, Mr J.K. Blogg. The previous restoration of the shrine building was commissioned in the 1970s by Camberwell City Council.

Two cannons, humorously known as "Brook's Babies" are located at the highest part of the Gardens. These were purchased by Arthur "Empire" Brooks in 1901 to commemorate the end of the Boer War.

The John Gray Memorial Rotunda was erected in 1921 and demolished in 1972.

== Gallery ==
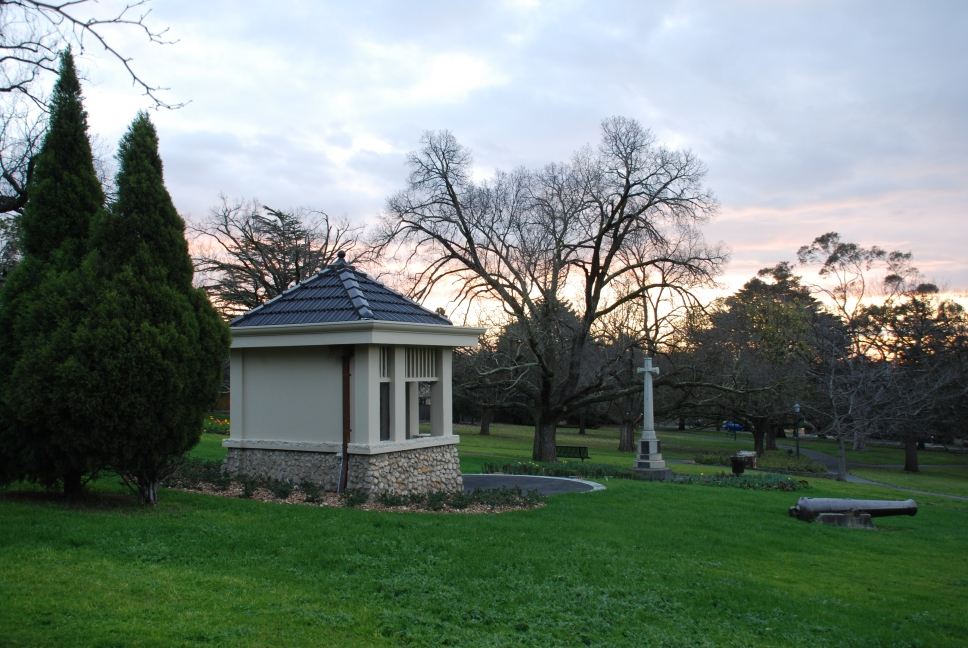
Surrey Gardens and Cenotaph, Surrey Hills, Australia
