= Far, Far Away on Judea's Plains =

1869 Christian hymn

"Far, Far, Away on Judea's Plains" was originally written for an 1869 Christmas program in St. George, Utah, when John Menzies Macfarlane desired a new song for his choir.

"Far, Far, Away on Judea's Plains" was first published in the Juvenile Instructor on December 15, 1889. The hymn has since become one of the few hymns of The Church of Jesus Christ of Latter-day Saints to become accepted in the broader Christian community.

The hymn's accompanying melody, "Chatterley," was also written by Macfarlane.
