= J. Spencer Kinard =

American radio and television personality

J. Spencer Kinard is an American radio and television personality He was a reporter for KSL television when he was invited to replace Richard L. Evans as voice of the Mormon Tabernacle Choir. Kinard had previously worked for CBS in New York. He spent 18 years as the voice of the choir.

== Early life ==
Kinard attended the University of Utah, graduating with a bachelor's degree in 1966. He went to work for CBS News in New York, where he also completed a CBS News fellowship at Columbia University. He returned to Utah in 1971 to work for then-CBS affiliate KSL-TV in Salt Lake City. After covering the funeral of Richard L. Evans that November, he became determined to break the story of who would replace Evans as voice of the choir. In the meantime, Alan Jensen (who had substituted for Evans from time to time) announced for the choir.

== Career ==
In January 1972, Kinard was invited to audition for the position of announcer. He was introduced to the choir the next week and officially took over the helm at the Tabernacle Choir's Music and the Spoken Word broadcast in February 1972, where he continued for 18 years. In the meantime he remained at KSL, where he gradually gained more responsibilities and eventually became news director.

On November 1, 1990, the Deseret News reported that Kinard had resigned as vice president of news and public affairs for KSL:

Kinard has been the subject of rumors about his relationship with KSL anchorwoman Jennifer Howe. Allegations within the Channel 5 newsroom that Kinard advanced Howe's career at the expense of other KSL employees led to widespread dissatisfaction among the staff for the past few months. Both Kinard and Howe deny those allegations. Howe is still on the KSL payroll, but she has not been on the air since Oct. 18. She is visiting her parents in Dallas. After a weeklong series of meetings, Kinard was placed on a medical leave from the station on Oct. 19. He reportedly was suffering from overwork and stress.

The next day, the Deseret News followed up with an article entitled "Kinard - At His Request - Is Released From Choir Post".

=== Later years ===
Kinard went on to become deputy director of the Utah Travel Council, where he worked for nearly twelve years until his 2006 retirement. Kinard is a member of the board of trustees of the University of Utah. He has been chairman of the national Radio-Television News Directors Association and was president of the University of Utah Alumni Association (2005–08).

Media offices
Preceded by Richard L. Evans	Announcer, Music and the Spoken Word; February, 1972–October, 1990	Succeeded by Lloyd D. Newell
