= Tabernacle Choir Christmas discography =

The Tabernacle Choir at Temple Square discography
- Studio albums: 8
- Live albums: 14

The Christmas discography of The Tabernacle Choir at Temple Square, a 360-member all-volunteer choir consists of at least six studio albums, at least eleven live albums, and many compilation albums. The choir is part of the Church of Jesus Christ of Latter-day Saints. However, the choir is completely self-funded, traveling and producing albums to support the organization.

The group's debut recording, Let The Mountains Shout For Joy/O My Father (1910) broke ground on the choir's long lasting influence on choral music.

The choir also performed "O Come All Ye Faithful" with crossover singer Josh Groban for his Grammy-nominated 2007 album, Noël, the best selling Holiday album of both 2007 and 2008. The album went Sextuple Platinum in the United States. They likewise performed "The Lord's Prayer" with Andrea Bocelli for his 2009 best selling Holiday album, My Christmas which has sold in excess of 5 million copies world-wide. The choir also performed "O Holy Night" with The Voice-winner Jordan Smith on his 2018 album, 'Tis The Season. Additionally, the choir performed "Amazing Grace" with Katharine McPhee on her 2022 album, Christmas Songs.

== Discography ==
=== Studio albums ===
List of albums, with selected chart positions
Title	Album details	Peak chart positions						Certifications
Title	Album details	US	US Holiday	US Classical	US Christian	US R&B	NOR	Certifications
Christmas Best	Released: September 8, 2021; Label: Intellectual Reserve, Inc.; Format: CD, DI, DVD	TBD	TBD	TBD	TBD	TBD	TBD	
Christmas Day in the Morning featuring Kelli O'Hara and Richard Thomas	Released: October 16, 2020; Label: Intellectual Reserve, Inc.; Format: CD, DI, DVD	—	—	—	—	—	—	
Angels Among Us featuring Kristin Chenoweth	Released: October 18, 2019; Label: Intellectual Reserve, Inc.; Format: CD, DI, DVD	—	9	4	18	—	—	
A Merry Little Christmas with Sutton Foster & Hugh Bonneville	Released: October 12, 2018; Label: Intellectual Reserve, Inc.; Format: CD, DI, DVD	—	—	13	—	—	—	
O Come Little Children feat. Rolando Villazón	Released: October 6, 2017; Label: Intellectual Reserve, Inc.; Format: CD, DI, DVD	—	—	20	—	—	—	
Hallelujah! feat. Laura Osnes with special guest Martin Jarvis	Released: October 7, 2016; Label: Intellectual Reserve, Inc.; Format: CD, DI, DVD	—	—	11	44	—	—	
Keep Christmas With You feat. Santino Fontana and The Muppets from Sesame Street	Released: October 16, 2015; Label: Intellectual Reserve, Inc.; Format: CD, DI, DVD	—	—	9	—	—	—	
Let the Season In feat. Deborah Voigt and John Rhys-Davies	Released: October 14, 2014; Label: Intellectual Reserve, Inc.; Format: CD, DI, DVD	—	—	10	—	—	—	
Home for the Holidays feat. Alfie Boe	Released: October 15, 2013; Label: Intellectual Reserve, Inc.; Format: CD, DI, DVD	—	42	14	25	—	—	
Once Upon a Christmas feat. Jane Seymour and Nathan Gunn	Released: September 04, 2012; Label: Intellectual Reserve, Inc.; Format: CD, DI, DVD	—	20	3	36	—	—	
Glad Christmas Tidings feat. David Archuleta	Released: August 26, 2011; Label: Intellectual Reserve, Inc.; Format: CD, DI, DVD	179	11	6	10	—	—	US: 28,000
The Most Wonderful Time of the Year with Natalie Cole	Released: August 24, 2010; Label: Intellectual Reserve, Inc.; Format: CD, DI, DVD	185	12	2	—	31	—	
Ring Christmas Bells with Brian Stokes Mitchell	Released: August 31, 2009; Label: Intellectual Reserve, Inc.; Format: CD, DI, DVD	—	4	4	9	—	—	
Rejoice and Be Merry! feat. The King's Singers	Released: September 30, 2008; Label: Intellectual Reserve, Inc.; Format: CD, DI, DVD	—	18	7	17	—	—	
Spirit of the Season with Sissel	Released: September 2007; Label: Intellectual Reserve, Inc.; Format: CD, DI, DVD	154	20	1	11	—	8	
The Wonder of Christmas	Released: September 26, 2006; Label: Intellectual Reserve, Inc.; Format: CD, DI	187	43	8	12	—	—	
Sing, Choirs of Angels!	Released: September 14, 2004; Label: Intellectual Reserve, Inc.; Format: CD, DI	—	40	4	25	—	—	
A Mormon Tabernacle Choir Christmas	Released: September 26, 2000; Label: Telarc International Corp.; Format: CD, DI	—	—	18	—	—	—	
A Christmas Gloria	Released: 1998; Label: Format: CD, DI	—	—	—	—	—	—	
Christmas With Charles Osgood	Released: 1997; Label: Format: CD, DI	—	—	—	—	—	—	
Nativity: The (Art And) Music of Christmas	Released: 1996; Label: Format: CD, DI	—	—	—	—	—	—	
This Is Christmas	Released: 1994; Label: Format: CD, DI	—	—	—	—	—	—	
Noel: A World Wide Christmas Celebration	Released: 1993; Label: Format: CD, DI	—	—	—	—	—	—	
Christmas with the Mormon Tabernacle Choir	Released: 1993; Label: LaserLight; Format: CD, cassette, DI	171	19	—	—	—	—	
Hallmark Presents Sandi Patti: Celebrate Christmas! 1992 - Hallmark Cards Christmas Album Vol. VIII	Released: 1992; Label: Hallmark Cards; Format: LP, CD	—	—	—	—	—	—	RIAA: Platinum
Hallmark Presents Carols of Christmas - Hallmark Cards Christmas Album Vol. V	Released: 1989; Label: Hallmark Cards; Format: LP, CD	—	—	—	—	—	—	RIAA: Platinum
Christmas with Marilyn Horne and The Mormon Tabernacle Choir	Released: 1983; Label: CBS Masterworks; Format: LP, CD	—	—	—	—	—	—	
Silent Night: The Greatest Hits of Christmas	Released: 1981; Label: CBS Masterworks; Format: LP, CD, cassette	—	29	—	—	—	—	
White Christmas	Released: 1977; Label: CBS Masterworks; Format: LP	—	—	—	—	—	—	
It's Christmas!	Released: 1977; Label: CBS Masterworks; Format: LP	—	—	—	—	—	—	
Joy to the World	Released: 1970; Label: Columbia Masterworks; Format: LP, CD, DI	—	—	—	—	—	—	RIAA: Gold
The Mormon Tabernacle Choir Sings Christmas Carols	Released: 1965; Label: Columbia Masterworks; Format: LP	6	—	—	—	—	—	RIAA: Gold
The Joy of Christmas with Leonard Bernstein and the New York Philharmonic	Released: 1963; Label: Columbia Masterworks; Format: LP, CD, DI	8	—	—	—	—	—	RIAA: Gold
Christmas Carols Around the World	Released: 1961; Label: Columbia Masterworks; Format: LP, CD	—	—	—	—	—	—	
The Holly and the Ivy	Released: 1960; Label: Columbia Masterworks; Format: LP	—	—	—	—	—	—	
Handel: Messiah with Eugene Ormandy and the Philadelphia Orchestra	Released: 1959; Label: Columbia Masterworks; Format: LP, CD, DI	3	—	—	—	—	—	RIAA: Gold
The Spirit of Christmas	Released: 1959; Label: Columbia Masterworks; Format: LP, CD	5	—	—	—	—	—	
The Mormon Tabernacle Choir Sings Christmas Carols	Released: 1957; Label: Columbia Masterworks; Format: LP	—	—	—	—	—	—	

=== As featured artist ===
Title	Year	Peak chart positions									Certifications	Album
Title	Year	US	AUS	CAN	GER	IRL	NLD	NZ	SWI	UK	Certifications	Album
"O Come All Ye Faithful" (Josh Groban featuring Mormon Tabernacle Choir)	2007	—	—	—	—	—	—	—	—	—	US ALBUM SALES: 6× Platinum	Noël
"The Lord's Prayer" (Andrea Bocelli featuring Mormon Tabernacle Choir)	2013	—	—	—	—	—	—	—	—	—	US ALBUM SALES: 2× Platinum	My Christmas
"O Holy Night" (Jordan Smith featuring Mormon Tabernacle Choir)	2016	—	—	—	—	—	—	—	—	—		'Tis the Season
"—" denotes a release that did not chart or was not released in that territory.
