= Schoenstein Organ at the Conference Center =

Pipe organ in Salt Lake City, Utah, U.S.

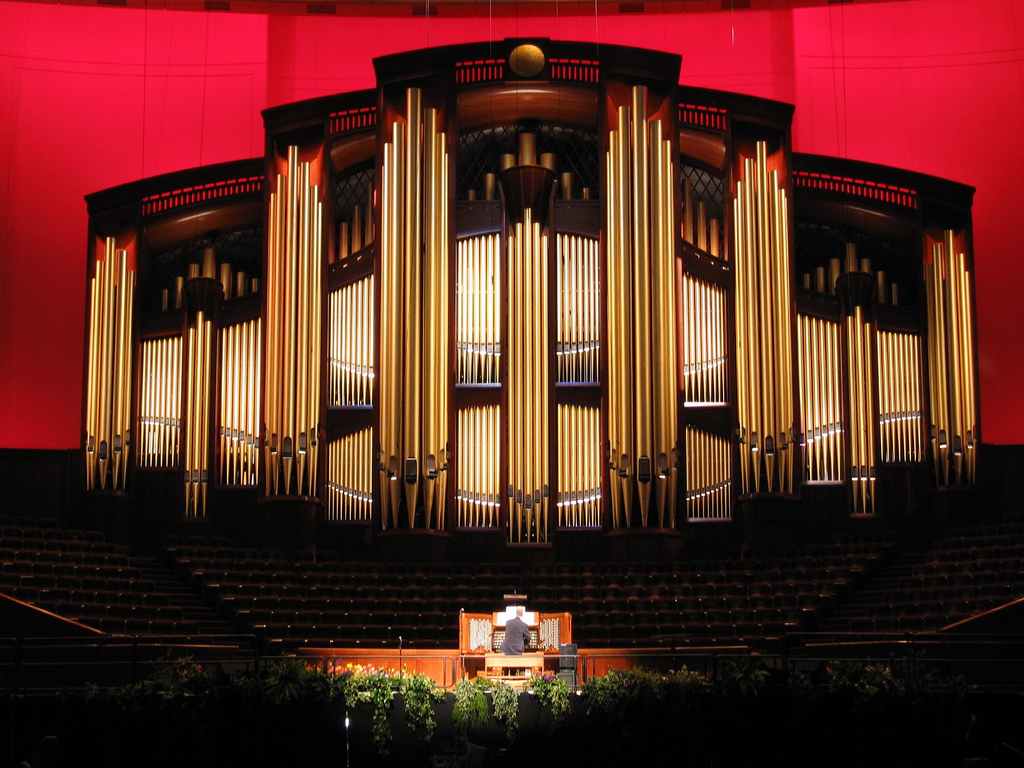
- Schoenstein Organ at the Conference Center

Background information
- Origin: Salt Lake City, Utah, United States
- Genres: Worship, classical
- Years active: 2003–present
- Label: Tabernacle Choir
- Website: Official Website

The Schoenstein Organ at the Conference Center is a pipe organ built by Schoenstein & Co., San Francisco, California located in the Conference Center of the Church of Jesus Christ of Latter-day Saints (LDS Church) in Salt Lake City, Utah. The organ was completed in 2003. It is composed of 160 speaking stops spread over five manuals and pedals. Along with the nearby Salt Lake Tabernacle organ, it is typically used to accompany the Tabernacle Choir at Temple Square. Schoenstein & Co.'s president and tonal director, Jack Bethards, describes it as "an American Romantic organ" that is "probably more English than anything else."

Originally, the builders were told the instrument would likely only be used during the LDS Church's April and October general conferences and a few other occasions annually. However, in addition to these events, the organ is now played for the second of two daily concerts during the summer tourist season (the first concert takes place in the Tabernacle, the regular home of the daily noon concerts), the annual First Presidency's Christmas Devotional, the Tabernacle Choir's Christmas concert series, and numerous other performances throughout the year.

The organ is about two-thirds the size of the Tabernacle organ in number of pipes (the Conference Center Organ has 7,708 pipes in 130 ranks, while the Tabernacle Organ has 11,623 pipes in 206 ranks). Former Tabernacle organist John Longhurst described it as a "project of immense proportion." According to Bethards, when played as a solo instrument, it is never amplified; its sound carries through the auditorium under the organ's power alone. The organ includes many stops on high wind pressure and is the only pipe organ in all the world to have both flue and reed ranks extending to GGGGG# in the 64' octave, 1 octave and 1 semitone below the lowest note of a standard piano.

Longhurst described his reaction to the announcement in 1996 of the building of the Conference Center and his involvement in the building of the organ as follows:

"Needless to say, [the announcement of the Conference Center] made it difficult for me to concentrate on the rest of the Conference session. I could only begin to envision a space like President Hinckley had described. I assumed that an organ would be necessary in that building and immediately began considering what that instrument might be. By this time Robert Cundick had retired, and Richard Elliott was now on staff. As it turned out, all of the experience previously gained working on the other Temple Square organs (and particularly the Tabernacle organ, which we had thought of as a culmination) we now viewed as preparation for what was to follow. President Hinckley's announcement that Easter morning began a journey for us organists that would not conclude for seven years, when the Conference Center's Schoenstein & Co. organ was finally declared finished, just in time for the A.G.O. bi-regional convention held in Salt Lake City in the summer of 2003."

The organ includes a number of so-called "mechanical aids," though these are actually electronic. According to principal Tabernacle organist Richard Elliott, these include a "built-in recorder," which allows organists to play a performance, and then go out into the auditorium and listen as the organ's computer replays the piece by physically sounding the pipes.

== Basic specification ==
- Builder: Schoenstein & Co., San Francisco, California, USA
  - Opus No: 139
- Console (designed similarly to the Tabernacle Organ's in an attempt to minimize inconvenience when switching between the instruments):
  - Mobile
  - 5 manuals
  - Pedal board: concave & radiating
- Stop controls: drawknob
- Speaking stops: 103
- Ranks: 130
- Pipes: 7,708
- Wind:
  - Power: 6 Ventus blowers
  - Pressures:
    - Choir: 140mm
    - Great: 140mm, 190mm
    - Swell: 140mm, 250mm
    - Solo: 250mm, 375mm
    - Orchestral: 250mm, 375mm
    - Pedal: 140mm, 190mm, 250mm, 375mm

== List of stops ==
I - CHOIR

(5^{1}/_{2}" wind) (Enclosed)

Bass Viol	16′
Lieblich Bourdon (metal)	16'
Viola Pomposa	8′
Viola Celeste	8′
Echo Gamba	8'
Gamba Celeste	8'
Viole d'orchestre	8'
Viole céleste	8'
Lieblich Bourdon	8'
Concert Flute (wood)	8'
Echo Diapason	8'
Nachthorn	4'
Fugara	4'
Nazard	2 ^{2}/_{3}′
Twelfth	2 ^{2}/_{3}′
Harmonic Piccolo	2'
Fifteenth	2'
Tierce	1 ^{3}/_{5}′
Nineteenth	1 ^{1}/_{3}′
Twenty-second	1'
Flügel Horn	16'
Trumpet	8'
Flügel Horn	8'
Cromorne	8'
Tuba Mirabilis (Orchestral)	8'
Millennial Trumpet (Solo)	8'
Rohr Schalmei	4'

Tremulant

II - GREAT

(5^{1}/_{2}" wind)

Dulciana	32'
Double Open Diapason	16′
Bourdon (wood)	16'
Stentor Diapason (Solo)	8'
Large Open Diapason (7^{1}/_{2}" wind)	8'
Open Diapason	8'
Horn Diapason	8'
Gamba	8'
Gemshorn	8'
Harmonic Flute	8'
Doppelflöte (wood)	8'
Principal (7^{1}/_{2}" wind)	4'
Octave	4'
Octave Gemshorn	4'
Forest Flute	4'
Twelfth	2 ^{2}/_{3}′
Fifteenth	2'
Seventeenth	1 ^{3}/_{5}′
Full Mixture (IV-V) (ff - 7^{1}/_{2}" wind)	2'
Mixture (IV) (f)	2'
Sharp Mixture (III) (mf)	1 ^{1}/_{3}′
Bass Trumpet (7^{1}/_{2}" wind)	16'
Trumpet (7^{1}/_{2}" wind)	8'
Tuba Mirabilis (Orchestral)	8'
Millennial Trumpet (Solo)	8'
Clarion (7^{1}/_{2}" wind)	4'

Tremulant

III - SWELL

(5^{1}/_{2}" wind) (Enclosed)

Double Open Diapason	16′
Bourdon (wood)	16'
Open Diapason	8'
Small Open Diapason	8'
Silver Flute	8′
Bourdon	8′
Viole de gambe	8′
Viole céleste	8'
Flauto Dolce	8′
Flute Celeste (TC)	8'
Principal	4'
Harmonic Flute	4'
Fifteenth	2'
Plein Jeu (V) (f)	2'
Cornet (III) (mf)	2 ^{2}/_{3}′
Contra Fagotto (10" wind)	32'
Bombarde	16'
Fagotto (10" wind)	16'
Trompette	8′
Cornopean (10" wind)	8′
Oboe	8′
Voix humaine †	8′
Clarion harmonique	4'
Clarion (10" wind)	4'

Tremulant
Separate tremulant †

IV - SOLO

(11^{1}/_{2}" wind) (Enclosed)

Open Diapason	8′
Phonon Diapason (Orchestral)	8′
Symphonic Flute	8′
Principal	4'
Octave (Orchestral)	4'
Quint Mixture (V)	2^{2}/_{3}'
French Horn	8′
Cor Anglais (Orchestral)	8'
Clarinet (Orchestral)	8'

Tremulant
Variable Tremulant

Separate Shades—Grand Solo

(17^{1}/_{2}" wind)

Tierce Mixture (IV-VI)
2'
Bass Tuba
16'
Tuba
8'
Tuben (III) †
8'
Tuba Clarion
4'

Unenclosed
Stentor Diapason (25" wind) ††	8'
Millennial Trumpet (15" wind)	8'

† Draws Bass Tuba, Tuba, and Tuba Clarion, all at 8' pitch
†† Extends Pedal Open Wood

V - ORCHESTRAL

(10" wind) (Enclosed)

Tibia Clausa (Wood)
16'
Phonon Diapason
8'
Tibia Clausa
8'
Stentor Gamba
8'
Celeste
8'
Octave
4'
Tibia Clausa
4'
Tibia Twelfth
2^{2}/_{3}'
Tibia Piccolo
2
Tibia Tierce
1^{3}/_{5}'
Clarinet
16'
Tuba Horn
8' (15" wind)
Clarinet
8'
Cromorne (Choir)
8'
Cor Anglais
8'
Vox Humana (5^{1}/_{2}" wind) †
8'

Tremulant††
Variable Tremulant

Tuba Mirabilis (20" wind)	8'

† Separate Tremulant draws with Vox Humana stop knob
†† Also draws Tuba Horn Tremulant

Tremulant

PERCUSSIONS

(Walker Digital)

Harp
(Choir)
Celesta
(Choir)
Orchestral Bells
(Choir)
Les cloches de Hinckley
(Great)
Cymbelstern
(Great)
Orchestral Harp
(Solo)
Celestial Chimes
(Solo)
Tower Chimes
(Pedal)

PEDAL (5^{1}/_{2}" wind)
Gamba (GGGGG# - 10" wind)	64'
Diaphone (Wood - 25" wind)	32'
Diapason (10" wind)	32'
Gamba	32'
Dulciana (Great)	32
Sub Bass (Wood - 10" wind)	32'
Diaphone (Wood)	16'
Open Wood (10" wind)	16'
Diapason	16'
Great Diapason (Great)	16'
Swell Diapason (Swell)	16'
Violone (Wood - 7^{1}/_{2}" wind)	16'
Gamba	16'
Bass Viol (Choir)	16'
Dulciana (Great)	16'
Sub Bass	16'
Bourdon (Swell)	16'
Lieblich Bourdon (Choir)	16'
Tibia Clausa (Orchestral)	16'
Quint	10^{2}/_{3}'
Open Wood	8'
Principal	8'
Gamba	8'
Flute	8'
Bass Viol (Choir)	8'
Sub Bass	8'
Bourdon (Swell)	8'
Lieblich Bourdon (Choir)	8'
Choral Bass	4'
Octave Flute	4'
Bass Viol (Choir)	4'
Rauschquinte (II)	2^{2}/_{3}'
Mixture (III)	1^{1}/_{3}'
Trombone (GGGGG# - 20" wind)	64'
Trombone	32'
Contra Fagotto (Swell)	32'
Trombone	16'
Bass Tuba (Solo)	16'
Bombarde (Swell)	16'
Bass Trumpet (Great)	16'
Fagotto (Swell)	16'
Flügel Horn (Choir)	16'
Clarinet (Orchestral)	16'
Tromba (15" wind)	8'
Bass Tuba (Solo)	8'
Bass Trumpet (Great)	8'
Bombarde (Swell)	8'
Fagotto (Swell)	8'
Clarinet (Orchestral)	8'
Flügel Horn (Choir)	8'
Tromba	4'
Bass Trumpet (Great)	4'
Cromorne (Choir)	4'

Pizzicato Bass (plays 16' Open Wood at 8' pitch through pizzicato relay)
