= Century Record Manufacturing Company =

American custom recording company

Century Record Manufacturing Company was an American custom recording company and record manufacturer. It was founded in 1958 as a division of the former Keysor-Century Corporation, a California corporation based in Saugus. Century Record Manufacturing Company served the music education market (mostly at the collegiate and high school levels) and the music groups of the U.S. Armed Forces, in addition to producing professional recordings. The company went out of business in 1976. Mark Records and Silver Crest Records are comparable labels.

== History ==
James Bernard ("Bud") Keysor, Jr. (1906–2000) founded Keysor-Century Corporation of Saugus in 1954 and was a partner in Century Record Manufacturing Company. He was also the corporate secretary of the company. At its founding, the company was a manufacturer of polyvinyl chloride resins. RCA Records was Keysor-Century's biggest customer. Jim Keysor (1927–2014), son of James Bernard Keysor, Jr., later served as President of Keysor-Century Record Company.

== Keysor-Century Corporation labels and affiliates ==
=== Parent company ===
Keysor-Century Corporation was the parent company of Century Record Manufacturing Company. Its executives included Howard Lydell Hill (1940–2001), who served as president from 1981 until his death in 2001; Robert Keysor, Hill's brother-in-law and third son of Bud Keysor, succeeded Hill in 1971 as president. In 2002, Keysor-Century was producing PVC resins for the flooring and packaging markets in Saugus, California. The firm also operated a compounding facility in Newark, Delaware.

The company had been a pioneer in creating PVC resins for the record industry. Keysor-Century produced (i) a black vinyl record compound called KC-B450 in the form of opaque black free-flowing pellets (for standard records), (ii) a widely popular translucent red, yellow, green, and blue KC-B460/470 series, and later, (iii) an audiophile grade called KC-600. In two audiophile mass market tests by A&M, Keysor-Century's KC-600 was used in the initial production of Supertramp's L.P., ...Famous Last Words... (fall 1982), and in the initial production (800,000 disks) of Styx's L.P., Kilroy Was Here (February 1983).

In 1982, Keysor-Century had added plants in Delaware City, Delaware, and Ajax, Ontario. At that time, Keysor-Century, Lenahan Chemicals (Murfreesboro, Tennessee), and Tenneco Chemical, Inc., (Burlington & Flemington, New Jersey) were the top three American bulk resin suppliers for records. In 1985, Keysor-Century claimed to be the largest U.S. producer of record compound and its customers included Warner, RCA, Capitol, Motown, CBS, Musical Heritage Society, Nonesuch, Deutsche Grammophon, and A&M.

Outside of the record industry, Keysor-Century was also a top-twenty supplier to general industry. It also supplied bulk resin for injection molding applications in the production of cassette shells and the like, used by the industry as well as its own tape duplicating service.

==== Bankruptcy ====
The Keysor-Century Corporation submitted a voluntary petition on March 19, 2002, in U.S. Bankruptcy Court in San Fernando, California for protection from creditors under Chapter 11, and after 21 months (in December, just before Christmas 2003), it filed to liquidate under Chapter 7. In June 2004 Keysor-Century pleaded guilty to several felony charges by the EPA in connection to hazardous substances.

In 2006, the EPA designated the Keysor-Century plant as a Superfund site.

=== Labels, recording, and engineering ===
- Altair Records, short-lived, easy listening label, founded 1969; Robert "Bob" Reiter, who had resigned in August 1969 as President of Happy Tiger Records, became executive director of Altair that same year
- Century Custom Recording Service, was a franchise of the Keysor-Century Corporation. By 1963, there were 80 franchise associates in the United States. The franchise associates often produced records as independent labels. Notable franchise associates included:

- Montgomery, Alabama: Tom Britton (né Thomas Abbott Britton, Jr.; 1939–2002), who, later, between 1979 and 1981, pioneered the production of more than a dozen high-quality digital recordings for Chalfont Records
- Paducah, Kentucky: Tom Morris (né Thomas Fredick Morris; 1937–1992)
- Richmond, Virginia: Rex Hawley produced The Chantells on the Century Custom label
- Lawrence, Kansas: Ed Down (né Edward Joseph Down; 1927–1978)
- Lawrence, Kansas: Stan Ricker (Note: Stan Ricker (né Stanley Forbes Ricker; 1935–2015) began his career in Lawrence, Kansas, working for the Century franchise associate. From 1969 to 1974, Ricker served at Keysor-Century's production facility in Saugus as Head of the QC (quality control), overseeing the Recording and Mastering Department, the Pressing and Inspection Department, and the Shipping Department. Ricker went on to become known for his mastering and engineering abilities on revolutionary vinyls by The Beatles, Frank Zappa, Electric Light Orchestra, Stevie Wonder, Pink Floyd, and Eric Clapton. Ricker was particularly known in the industry as a pioneer and exponent of half-speed mastering, a technique where the cutting lathe turns at exactly half the intended playback speed, which gives the cutting head twice as much time to cut complex analogue grooves into the vinyl, which enhances the sonic accuracy. Records that Ricker mastered are often reflected in the matrix code (aka dead wax) as SR or SR/2, or some variation thereof (the "/2" meant that the mastering was done at half-speed).)
- Williamsville, New York: Vincent Morette, who founded Mark Records
- Cleveland, Ohio: Jack L. Renner (né Jack Lee Renner; born 1935)
- Houston, Texas: J.L. Patterson, Jr., who, later, in 1963, formed the JLP Corporation to operate Gold Star Studios (Gold Star Records) of Houston under a lease from its founder, Bill Quinn (né William Russell Quinn; 1904–1976), who retired; his partners included Jack Clement, Bill Hall (né William Gordon Hall; 1929–1983), Louis Stevenson, and Bob Lurie (né Robert Lurie) (main master cutting engineer); in 1965, two additional partners joined – Bill Holford and Bert Frilot (né Gilbert Clark Frilot; 1939–1999) (who later designed and built Gilley's Recording Studio) – and renamed the company HSP Corporation
- Oakland, California: LaMont Bench (1916–1992) recorded the hit, "Oh Happy Day," initially on the Century Custom label
- Eugene, Oregon: Garyl G. Fisher (né Garyl Guy Fisher; born 1924) and Don Ainge (né Everett Donald Ainge; born 1936) produced several garage band recordings in Eugene; Ainge is the father of Danny Ainge, former professional athlete and current executive with the Boston Celtics

- Century Records – Glen Glancy (né Glen Thomas Glancy; born 1943), president – produced jazz albums in the latter half of the 1970s; artists include the Phil Woods Quintet, the Woody Herman Band, Mel Torme and Buddy Rich, Benny Goodman, and the Hal Galper Quintet
- United Sound – sub-label of Keysor-Century
- The Great American Gramophone Company – Glen Glancy, president – served as the premium audiophile limited-edition version of Century Records; and released only direct to disc jazz; it was based in Hollywood. It was formed in 1977 by Keysor-Century. Artists include Buddy Rich, Woody Herman, Phil Woods, Les Brown, and Robert Cundick playing the Mormon Tabernacle Organ; the album catalog numbers began with alpha characters "GADD"

=== In-house mastering labs ===
- Keysor-Century Studios
- K Disc Mastering, a subsidiary of Keysor-Century Corporation – founded in 1975 – was a disc mastering firm that became the successor to Keysor-Century Studios, when it moved to Hollywood in 1979

=== Pressing plant ===
- Century Record Manufacturing Company – Saugus

=== Milling plant ===
- Keysor Chemical Company – Saugus

=== Specialty products ===
- POLY Laboratories, Burbank, founded in the late 1940s, preceding Keysor-Century, where Keysor took plastic powder, colored it transparent red, and pressed it into record discs.

== Controversy ==
In 2000, Keysor-Century was the subject of a probe by the EPA in connection over dumping of toxic wastewater into the Santa Clara River. Concern over carcinogens had been an ongoing matter, as evidenced by a 1978 EPA "Survey of Vinyl Chloride Levels in the Vicinity of Keysor-Century, Saugus, California."

== Family aspect of the Keysor-Century businesses ==
Century Records was very much a family business. Bud Keysor, the father, and his wife, had three sons and two daughters: James Brian Keysor (1927–2014), Richard "Dick" Keysor, Robert Keysor, Carolyne Pearl Keysor, and Katherine Keysor. The three sons became involved in the business and moved up to significant areas of responsibility as production manager, sales manager, and finance manager.

== Selected discography ==
1. A Project For Your Art Department
  Jim Keysor
  Century Records
  7" 45 RPM, promo, yellow translucent disc
  Recorded in the early 1960s
  Side A: "A Project For Your Art Department"
  Side B: "Helpful Hints"
  B1: "Producing Your Album Covers"
  B2: "How To Record"
  B3: "Tape Editing"
  B4: "Marketing Your Records"
2. The Sound of a Secure Future
  James B. Keysor
  Century Records FV 13957
  Vinyl LP
  Recorded 1961
  Side A: Matrix ® XY 13957-1
  Side B: Matrix ® XY 13957-2
  This was a promo for the Century Records franchise associate program
  Interviewee – James B. Keysor
  Interviewer (uncredited) – Gabe Bartold (Note: Gabriel Bartold (1919–1980) had been a virtuoso classical trumpeter; as early as 1960, he was (i) director of the Los Angeles Concert Band and (ii) National Director of Custom Recordings for Century Records; he also was the company's first recording engineer. ("James B. Keysor – The Sound Of A Secure Future," Discogs, retrieved May 9, 2017) He and his wife died in an automobile accident on October 31, 1980.)

== Selected publications ==
- "Horns" (white paper), by Russell W. Peters, Technical Service and Product Manager, Keysor-Century Corporation, August 4, 1975
