= Once Upon a Christmas =

Once Upon a Christmas may refer to:

- Once Upon a Christmas (Kenny Rogers and Dolly Parton album), 1984
- Once Upon a Christmas (Mormon Tabernacle Choir album), 2012
- Once Upon a Christmas: The Original Story, a children's album
- Once Upon a Christmas (film), released 2000
- Mickey's Once Upon a Christmas, an animated movie, released direct to video in 1999
