= Century Records (disambiguation) =

Century Records is a former record label based in Sydney, Australia, in the 1940s and 1950s.

Century Records may also refer to:

- Century Records, a former record label of Century Record Manufacturing Company
- 20th Century Records, former record label that operated as a subsidiary of 20th Century Fox
- Century Media Records, a heavy metal record label that was bought by Sony in 2015
- Another Century Records, an alternative rock record label that was bought by Sony in 2015
