= Joy to the World (disambiguation) =

"Joy to the World" is a Christmas carol written by Isaac Watts/George Frideric Handel.

Joy to the World may also refer to:

== Music ==
=== Albums ===
- Joy to the World (Connie Smith album)
- Joy to the World (Faith Hill album)
- Joy to the World (Lincoln Brewster album)
- Joy to the World (Mormon Tabernacle Choir album)
- Joy to the World (Pink Martini album)
- Joy To The World: A Bluegrass Christmas, a 2009 album by Charlie Daniels
- Joy to the World: Their Greatest Hits, a Three Dog Night album

=== Songs and compositions ===
- "Joy to the World" (Three Dog Night song)
- "Joy to the World" (Phelps), an adaptation of Watts' lyrics by early Latter Day Saint leader William W. Phelps
- "Joy to the World", a song by Combichrist from the album The Joy of Gunz
- "Joy to the World", a song by Flow and Kiba of Akiba
- "Joy to the World", a song by Bini

== Television ==
- "Joy to the World" (Doctor Who), the 2024 Christmas special of the television series Doctor Who
- "Joy to the World" (House), an episode of the television series House

== See also ==
- A Very Special Christmas: 25 Years Bringing Joy to the World
