= John Longhurst =

John Longhurst (born 1940) is an organist and from 1977 through 2007 was the principal organ accompanist for the Tabernacle Choir on the Mormon Tabernacle Organ. He is also noted for writing the music to the Latter-day Saint hymn "I Believe in Christ" and being one of the few main forces behind the design of the Conference Center organ. He is the author of Magnum Opus: The Building of the Schoenstein Organ at the Conference Center of The Church of Jesus Christ of Latter-day Saints. As a child, Longhurst lived on a ranch near Placerville, California. In 1949, his father died and the family subsequently moved to Salt Lake City, Utah. As a young man, Longhurst served as a missionary for the Church of Jesus Christ of Latter-day Saints in the Eastern Atlantic States Mission.

During the mid-1960s, Longhurst was a singing member of the Tabernacle Choir.

Longhurst earned bachelor's and master's degrees in music from the University of Utah and the Doctor of Musical Arts degree from the Eastman School of Music at the University of Rochester. His principal organ teachers were Alexander Schreiner, David Craighead and Robert Noehren. Between 1969 and 1977, Longhurst also served on the music faculty at Brigham Young University.

Longhurst married Nancy Meldrim, a native of Syracuse, New York, in the Salt Lake Temple in 1969. They are the parents of five children, one of whom died shortly after birth.

== Discography ==
Mormon Tabernacle Organ

- Released: 1984
- Format: CD, Album, PolyGram, Cassette, Stereo, Dolby B, LP
- Label: Philips

A Tebernacle Organ Duo Extravaganza

- Released: 1991
- Format: CD
- Label: Argo

In Dulci Jubilo: A Christmas Celebration for Organ

- Released: 1995
- Format: CD
- Label: Bonneville Classics

Romantic French Fantasies

- Released: 1995
- Format: CD
- Label: Klavier Records

Now Let Us Rejoice: Organ Hymns for the Sabbath

- Released: 2006
- Format: CD
- Label: Mormon Tabernacle Choir
