= O Come Little Children (album) =

Live album by Mormon Tabernacle Choir featuring Rolando Villazón
- Released: October 7, 2017
- Recorded: December 17–20, 2016
- Genre: Christmas
- Length: 79:25
- Label: Mormon Tabernacle Choir
- Producer: Mack Wilberg, Ryan T. Murphy, Fred Vogler, Bruce Leek

Mormon Tabernacle Choir chronology
Hallelujah! (2016)	O Come Little Children (2017)	A Merry Little Christmas (2018)

O Come Little Children was recorded during the Mormon Tabernacle Choir's 2016 Christmas shows in the LDS Conference Center, featuring Rolando Villazón. An album and concert DVD was released on October 7, 2017. The recorded concert premiered on PBS on December 15, 2017.

== Track listing ==
CD
No.	Title	Performer(s)	Length
1.	"I Saw Three Ships"	Choir, Orchestra, and Bells at Temple Square	3:05
2.	"Carol of the Drum"	Choir, and Orchestra	3:23
3.	"Deck the Halls"	Choir, Rolando Villazón, and Orchestra	3:03
4.	"Canción para la Navidad"	Choir, Rolando Villazón, and Orchestra	4:06
5.	"How Excellent Thy Name and Alleluia, from Saul"	Choir and Orchestra	2:35
6.	"Alleluia"	Choir and Orchestra	5:44
7.	"Alleluia, from "Psalm 150""	Choir and Orchestra	3:34
8.	"Christmas Children, from Scrooge"	Choir and Orchestra	3:06
9.	"Parade of the Wooden Soldiers"	Orchestra	4:04
10.	"Campana Sobre Campana"	Choir, Rolando Villazón, Bells, and Orchestra	2:43
11.	"Il est né, le divin Enfant"	Choir, Angela Brower, and Orchestra	2:34
12.	"Holidays at Home"	Choir, Rolando Villazón, Angela Brower, and Orchestra	4:34
13.	"We Three Kings"	Richard Elliott, Clay Christiansen, and Andrew E. Unsworth	3:42
14.	"O souverain, ô juge, ô père from Le Cid"	Rolando Villazón, and Orchestra	5:04
15.	"The Little Match Girl"	Choir, Rolando Villazón, and Orchestra	14:04
16.	"O Come, Little Children"	Choir and Orchestra	5:20
17.	"Luke 2: The Christmas Story"	Rolando Villazón, and Orchestra	2:39
18.	"Angels from the Realms of Glory"	Choir, Rolando Villazón, Bells, and Orchestra	4:37
