= Let The Season In =

2014 live album by Mormon Tabernacle Choir

Live album by Mormon Tabernacle Choir featuring Deborah Voigt and John Rhys-Davies
- Released: October 14, 2014
- Recorded: 2013
- Genre: Christmas
- Label: Mormon Tabernacle Choir
- Producers: Mack Wilberg, Ryan T. Murphy, Bruce Leek, Fred Vogler, Scott Barrick, Carol Brown, Julie Rohde

Mormon Tabernacle Choir chronology
Home for the Holidays (2013)	Let The Season In (2014)	Keep Christmas With You (2015)

Let The Season In was recorded during the Mormon Tabernacle Choir's 2013 Christmas shows in the LDS Conference Center, with special guests operatic soprano Deborah Voigt and actor John Rhys-Davies. An album and concert DVD were released on October 14, 2014, along with a companion book titled God Bless Us, Every One!: The Story Behind A Christmas Carol. The recorded concert will be broadcast on PBS premiering December 19, 2014.

== Track listing ==
CD
No.	Title	Performer(s)	Length
1.	"Christmas Is Coming"	Choir and Orchestra	2:46
2.	"Processional: On This Merriest Christmas Day"	Choir, Orchestra, and Brass Band	4:41
3.	"The Holly and the Ivy"	Deborah Voigt, Choir, and Orchestra	4:03
4.	"And There Were Shepherds Abiding in the Fields"	Deborah Voigt and Orchestra	3:07
5.	"Magnificat in D Major"	Choir and Orchestra	3:23
6.	"Et Exsultavit Spiritus Meus"	Deborah Voigt and Orchestra	2:08
7.	"Gloria Patri"	Choir and Orchestra	2:06
8.	"Ring Those Christmas Bells"	Choir, Orchestra, and Bells	2:45
9.	"The Twelve Days after Christmas"	Deborah Voigt and Orchestra	3:30
10.	"Christmas Wishes Medley"	Deborah Voigt, Choir, and Orchestra	6:04
11.	"A Russian Christmas Festivity - Polonaise (excerpt), from Christmas Eve"	Choir and Orchestra	2:23
12.	"A Russian Christmas Festivity - Dance of the Tumblers (excerpt), from The Snow Maiden"	Orchestra	3:18
13.	"A Russian Christmas Festivity - Procession of the Nobles (excerpt), from Mlada"	Choir and Orchestra	1:23
14.	"God Rest Ye Merry, Gentlemen"	Richard Elliott	4:11
15.	"Coventry Carol"	Deborah Voigt and Choir	4:45
16.	"Luke 2: The Christmas Story"	John Rhys-Davies and Orchestra	2:34
17.	"Angels, from the Realms of Glory"	Deborah Voigt, Choir, and Orchestra	4:35
18.	"We Wish You a Merry Christmas"	Choir and Orchestra	1:08
Total length:			59:49

== Charts ==
Chart (2014)	Peak position
U.S. Billboard Classical	10
