= Angels Among Us (album) =

2019 live album by The Tabernacle Choir at Temple Square

Live album by The Tabernacle Choir at Temple Square featuring Kristin Chenoweth
- Released: October 12, 2019
- Recorded: December 13–15, 2018
- Genre: Christmas
- Label: Intellectual Reserve
- Producers: Mack Wilberg, Ryan T. Murphy

The Tabernacle Choir at Temple Square chronology
A Merry Little Christmas (2018)	Angels Among Us (2019)	Christmas Day in the Morning (2020)

Angels Among Us was recorded during The Tabernacle Choir at Temple Square's 2018 Christmas shows in the LDS Conference Center, featuring vocalist Kristin Chenoweth. An album and concert DVD was released on October 12, 2019. The recorded concert was broadcast on PBS and KUED on December 16, 2019, and BYUtv beginning on December 19, 2019.

== Track listing ==
CD
No.	Title	Performer(s)	Length
1.	"Hark! The Herald Angels Sing"	Choir and Orchestra, Gabriel Trumpet Ensemble	3:48
2.	"Gift of Christmas, Everywhere!"	Choir and Orchestra	3:12
3.	"We Need a Little Christmas"	Choir, Kristin Chenoweth, and Orchestra	2:41
4.	"O Holy Night"	Choir, Kristin Chenoweth, and Orchestra	5:06
5.	"For Unto Us a Child Is Born, from Messiah"	Choir and Orchestra	3:12
6.	"Hymn of Praise"	Choir and Orchestra	3:57
7.	"Mary, Did You Know?"	Choir, Kristin Chenoweth, and Orchestra	4:15
8.	"Come On, Ring Those Bells"	Choir, Kristin Chenoweth, and Orchestra	2:15
9.	"March of the Toy Soldiers, from The Nutcracker"	Orchestra	1:12
10.	"Dance of the Sugar Plum Fairy, from The Nutcracker"	Orchestra	1:52
11.	"Russian Dance, from The Nutcracker"	Orchestra	1:18
12.	"The Christmas Waltz"	Kristin Chenoweth and Orchestra	2:58
13.	"The Twelve Days of Christmas"	Choir and Orchestra	8:36
14.	"Carol of the Bells"	Richard Elliott, Bells at Temple Square	2:35
15.	"Child of Light"	Choir and Orchestra	2:04
16.	"Somewhere in My Memory, from Home Alone"	Choir and Orchestra	3:44
17.	"Angels Among Us"	Choir, Kristin Chenoweth, and Orchestra	4:13
18.	"Fill the World with Love, from Goodbye, Mr. Chips"	Choir and Orchestra	4:01
19.	"What Child Is This?"	Choir, Kristin Chenoweth, and Orchestra	3:21
20.	"A Christmas Meditation"	Choir and Orchestra	4:27
21.	"Angels from the Realms of Glory"	Choir, Kristin Chenoweth, and Orchestra	4:45

== Personnel ==
- Kristin Chenoweth – vocals
- Richard Kaufman – conductor
- Mack Wilberg – arranger
- Ryan Murphy – arranger
- Ryan T. Murphy – choir director
- Seph Stanek – producer
- Ron Gunnell – executive producer
- Brandon Brigham – engineer

== Charts ==
Chart (2019)	Peak position
U.S. Billboard Classical	4
U.S. Billboard Christian	18
