= Christmas Day in the Morning (Tabernacle Choir album) =

2020 live album by The Tabernacle Choir at Temple Square

Live album by The Tabernacle Choir at Temple Square featuring Kelli O'Hara and Richard Thomas
- Released: October 16, 2020
- Recorded: December 12-14, 2019
- Genre: Christmas
- Length: 67:12
- Label: Intellectual Reserve
- Producers: Mack Wilberg, Ryan T. Murphy, Bruce Leek, Fred Vogler

The Tabernacle Choir at Temple Square chronology
Angels Among Us (2019)	Christmas Day in the Morning (2020)	Christmas Best (2021)

Christmas Day in the Morning was recorded during The Tabernacle Choir at Temple Square's 2019 Christmas concert in the LDS Conference Center, and features vocalist Kelli O'Hara, actor Richard Thomas, and the Gabriel Trumpet Ensemble. The album was released in tandem with a concert DVD on October 16, 2020. The recorded concert was broadcast on PBS on December 14, 2020 and BYUtv beginning on December 17, 2020.

== Production and development ==
The album was produced as a recording of the Tabernacle Choir's 2019 Christmas concert, which ran from December 12-14, 2019. It was the 20th Christmas concert the choir has performed in the Conference Center.

The concert was the last Christmas concert the Tabernacle Choir held before the COVID-19 pandemic, and featured an Americana-themed program with music from many traditions, including folk, bluegrass, Broadway, and African-American spirituals, including many lesser-known Christmas songs. It included a medley of songs from Rodgers and Hammerstein, as well as lesser-known Christmas songs like "The Birthday of a King" and "Baby of Bethlehem," performed by Kelli O'Hara. Richard Thomas narrated the opening processional "Star in the East" (arranged by Mack Wilberg), the traditional Christmas story from Luke 2, and the Pearl S. Buck story "Christmas Day in the Morning.

Music Director Mack Wilberg noted that the 2019 concert program was "completely different from years past," and hoped viewers would enjoy watching it from home during the 2020 Christmas season. O'Hara and Thomas said that the Christmas program's release in late 2020 (during the COVID-19 pandemic) would make it more impactful for audiences.

== Track listing ==
CD
No.	Title	Performer(s)	Length
1.	"Star in the East"	Richard Thomas, Choir and Orchestra	5:57
2.	"In Dulci Jubilo"	Gabriel Trumpet Ensemble, Choir, Orchestra, Bells at Temple Square	2:59
3.	"Mary's Little Boy Child"	Kelli O'Hara, Choir and Orchestra	3:17
4.	"The Birthday of a King"	Kelli O'Hara, Choir and Orchestra	3:35
5.	"A Christmas Overture"	Orchestra	4:52
6.	"Celebrating Rodgers and Hammerstein"	Kelli O'Hara, Choir and Orchestra	4:09
7.	"A Cradle in Bethlehem"	Kelli O'Hara, Choir and Orchestra	4:45
8.	"Hallelujah from Cantata Bwv 143 Praise the Lord My Soul"	Choir and Orchestra	2:21
9.	"Hallelujah from Messiah"	Gabriel Trumpet Ensemble, Choir and Orchestra	3:57
10.	"Tree of Life"	Choir, Orchestra, and Bells at Temple Square	5:41
11.	"Mashing Through the Snow (Jingle Bells)"	Cold Creek, Richard Elliott	3:08
12.	"Christmas Day in the Morning"	Richard Thomas, Choir and Orchestra	11:06
13.	"Baby of Bethlehem (Singing in the Land)"	Kelli O'Hara, Choir and Orchestra	4:00
14.	"The Christmas Story - Luke 2"	Richard Thomas, Choir and Orchestra	2:40
15.	"Angels from the Realms of Glory"	Kelli O'Hara, Gabriel Trumpet Ensemble, Choir, Orchestra, and Bells at Temple Square	4:45

== Personnel ==
- Kelli O'Hara – vocals
- Richard Thomas - narration
- Mack Wilberg – conductor and arranger
- Ryan Murphy – conductor and arranger
- LeAnna Willmore - Conductor, Bells at Temple Square
- Bradley V. Omer - Gabriel Trumpet Ensemble
- Ron Jarrett - Choir president
- Bruce Leek – producer
- Fred Vogler - producer
