= Home for the Holidays (Mormon Tabernacle Choir album) =

Home for the Holidays feat. Alfie Boe

Live album by Mormon Tabernacle Choir featuring Alfie Boe
- Released: October 15, 2013
- Recorded: 2012
- Genre: Christmas
- Length: 59:49
- Label: Mormon Tabernacle Choir
- Producer: Mack Wilberg, Ryan T. Murphy, Bruce Leek, Fred Vogler

Mormon Tabernacle Choir chronology
| Once Upon a Christmas (2012) | Home for the Holidays feat. Alfie Boe (2013) | Let The Season In (2014) |

Professional ratings
Review scores
| Source | Rating |
|---|---|
| Salt Lake Tribune | (very favorable) |

Home for the Holidays was recorded during the Mormon Tabernacle Choir's 2012 Christmas shows in the LDS Conference Center, with special guests English tenor Alfie Boe, former NBC News anchor Tom Brokaw, and Retired Col. Gail Halvorsen a.k.a. "Candy Bomber". An album and concert DVD were released on October 15, 2013 along with a companion book titled Christmas from Heaven: The Story of the Berlin Candy Bomber. The recorded concert will be broadcast on PBS premiering December 10, 2013. The Salt Lake Tribune said concerning this performance that "this year's edition may have topped them all."

== Track listing ==
CD
| No. | Title | Performer(s) | Length |
|---|---|---|---|
| 1. | "Jingle Bells" | Mormon Tabernacle Choir, Orchestra at Temple Square, and Bells on Temple Square | 2:55 |
| 2. | "Sing Noel! A Christmas Processional" | Mormon Tabernacle Choir, Orchestra at Temple Square, and Bells on Temple Square | 4:38 |
| 3. | "Hark! The Herald Angels Sing" | Alfie Boe with Mormon Tabernacle Choir and Orchestra at Temple Square | 5:13 |
| 4. | "I Wonder as I Wander" | Alfie Boe with Orchestra at Temple Square | 5:14 |
| 5. | "From Heaven on High, from Weihnachtslied" | Mormon Tabernacle Choir and Orchestra at Temple Square | 4:48 |
| 6. | "God Bless the Master of this House, from Folk Songs of the Four Seasons" | Mormon Tabernacle Choir and Orchestra at Temple Square | 4:22 |
| 7. | "Christmas at Home: (There's No Place Like) Home for the Holidays, I'll Be Home for Christmas, Somewhere in My Memory, from Home Alone" | Alfie Boe with Mormon Tabernacle Choir and Orchestra at Temple Square | 7:10 |
| 8. | "Bring Him Home, from Les Misérables" | Alfie Boe with Orchestra at Temple Square | 5:02 |
| 9. | "A Christmas Waltz Fantasy: The Christmas Waltz; Silver Bells; Sleep Well, Little Children" | Mormon Tabernacle Choir and Orchestra at Temple Square | 7:45 |
| 10. | "Sleigh Ride (organ performance)" | Richard Elliott | 3:24 |
| 11. | "What Shall We Give?" | Mormon Tabernacle Choir and Orchestra at Temple Square | 4:40 |
| 12. | "Angels From the Realms of Glory" | Alfie Boe with Mormon Tabernacle Choir and Orchestra at Temple Square | 4:38 |
| Total length: | | | 59:49 |

The DVD and Blu-ray disc version also include tracks of a reading of Luke 2 by Tom Brokaw (2:24 in length) and Christmas From Heaven by Brokaw and Halvorsen (13:22 in length).

== Charts ==
| Chart (2013) | Peak position |
|---|---|
| U.S. Billboard Holiday | 42 |
| U.S. Billboard Classical | 14 |
| U.S. Billboard Christian | 25 |

=== Year-end charts ===
| Chart (2014) | Position |
|---|---|
| US Billboard Classical | 26 |
