= A Merry Little Christmas (Mormon Tabernacle Choir album) =

2018 live album by Mormon Tabernacle Choir

Live album by Mormon Tabernacle Choir featuring Sutton Foster
- Released: October 12, 2018
- Recorded: December 14–16, 2017
- Genre: Christmas
- Label: Mormon Tabernacle Choir
- Producers: Mack Wilberg, Ryan T. Murphy, Fred Vogler, Bruce Leek

Mormon Tabernacle Choir chronology
O Come Little Children (2017)	A Merry Little Christmas (2018)	Angels Among Us (2019)

Professional ratings
Review scores
Source	Rating
Rolling Stone	(favorable)

A Merry Little Christmas was recorded during the Mormon Tabernacle Choir's 2017 Christmas shows in the LDS Conference Center, featuring vocalist Sutton Foster and actor Hugh Bonneville. An album and concert DVD was released on October 12, 2018. The recorded concert premiered on PBS on December 17, 2018 and BYUtv on December 20, 2018. It was the last Christmas album released under the Mormon Tabernacle Choir name; the choir had changed its name on October 5 to "The Tabernacle Choir at Temple Square" in order to align with the direction of LDS Church leadership regarding the use of terms "Mormon" and "LDS" in referencing church members.

== Track listing ==
CD
No.	Title	Performer(s)	Length
1.	"Joy to the World"	Choir and Orchestra	2:45
2.	"Just Once a Year"	Choir, Sutton Foster, Hugh Bonneville, and Orchestra	4:34
3.	"It's the Most Wonderful Time of the Year"	Choir, Sutton Foster, and Orchestra	3:25
4.	"Christmas Time Is Here, from A Charlie Brown Christmas"	Sutton Foster and Orchestra	2:37
5.	"Unfold, Ye Portals, from The Redemption"	Choir and Orchestra	3:14
6.	"Sing!"	Choir and Orchestra	5:23
7.	"Sunshine on My Shoulders"	Sutton Foster and Orchestra	4:21
8.	"Pure Imagination, from Willy Wonka and the Chocolate Factory"	Choir, Sutton Foster, and Orchestra	4:09
9.	"Sleigh Ride"	Orchestra	2:49
10.	"Snow!"	Choir, Sutton Foster, and Orchestra	2:29
11.	"Have Yourself a Merry Little Christmas"	Choir, Sutton Foster, and Orchestra	1:46
12.	"Happy Holiday! / It's the Holiday Season"	Choir, Sutton Foster, and Orchestra	2:25
13.	"I Saw Three Ships"	Richard Elliott, Matt Nickle, Danny Soulier, Jared Cragun	2:59
14.	"It Is Well with My Soul"	Choir, Hugh Bonneville, and Orchestra	16:23
15.	"Silent Night"	Choir and Orchestra	4:04
16.	"Luke 2: The Christmas Story"	Choir, Hugh Bonneville, and Orchestra	2:19
17.	"Angels from the Realms of Glory"	Choir, Sutton Foster, and Orchestra	4:40
