= Hallelujah! (Mormon Tabernacle Choir album) =

2016 live album by the Mormon Tabernacle Choir

Live album by Mormon Tabernacle Choir featuring Laura Osnes and guest artist Martin Jarvis
- Released: October 7, 2016
- Recorded: December 17–20, 2015
- Genre: Christmas
- Label: Mormon Tabernacle Choir
- Producer: Mack Wilberg, Ryan T. Murphy, Fred Vogler, Bruce Leek

Mormon Tabernacle Choir chronology
Keep Christmas With You (2015)	Hallelujah! (2016)	O Come Little Children (2017)

Hallelujah! was recorded during the Mormon Tabernacle Choir's 2015 Christmas shows in the LDS Conference Center, with special guests Broadway star Laura Osnes, actor Martin Jarvis, and guest soloists from the Metropolitan Opera (Erin Morley, Tamara Mumford, Ben Bliss, Tyler Simpson). An album and concert DVD was released on October 7, 2016. The album will be broadcast on WMHT-FM on December 11, 2016. The recorded concert premiered on PBS on December 19, 2016.

== Track listing ==
CD
No.	Title	Performer(s)	Length
1.	"Come All Ye Children, Singing"	Choir, Orchestra, and Bells	2:44
2.	"Of the Father's Love Begotten"	Metropolitan Opera Soloists, Choir, and Orchestra	4:50
3.	"Oh, Come, All Ye Faithful"	Laura Osnes, Choir, and Orchestra	4:06
4.	"Do You Hear What I Hear?"	Laura Osnes, Choir, and Orchestra	3:40
5.	"Over the River and through the Wood"	Choir, Orchestra, and Bells	2:22
6.	"Troika, from Lieutenant Kijé Suite, op. 60"	Orchestra	2:50
7.	"The Secret of Christmas, from Say One for Me"	Laura Osnes and Orchestra	4:25
8.	"Christmas Bell Fantasy"	Laura Osnes, Choir, and Orchestra	4:17
9.	"Fum, Fum, Fum!"	Choir and Orchestra	1:23
10.	"Farandole, from L'arlésienne Suite, no. 2"	Choir and Orchestra	4:11
11.	"Let Earth Receive Her King! (Joy to the World)"	Richard Elliott	2:40
12.	""For Unto Us"—The Story of Messiah"	Martin Jarvis, Choir, and Orchestra	27:05
13.	"The Wexford Carol"	Choir and Orchestra	3:44
14.	"Luke 2: The Christmas Story"	Martin Jarvis, Choir, and Orchestra	2:11
15.	"Angels from the Realms of Glory"	Laura Osnes, Choir, and Orchestra	4:52
Total length:			1:16:34
