= Robert M. Cundick =

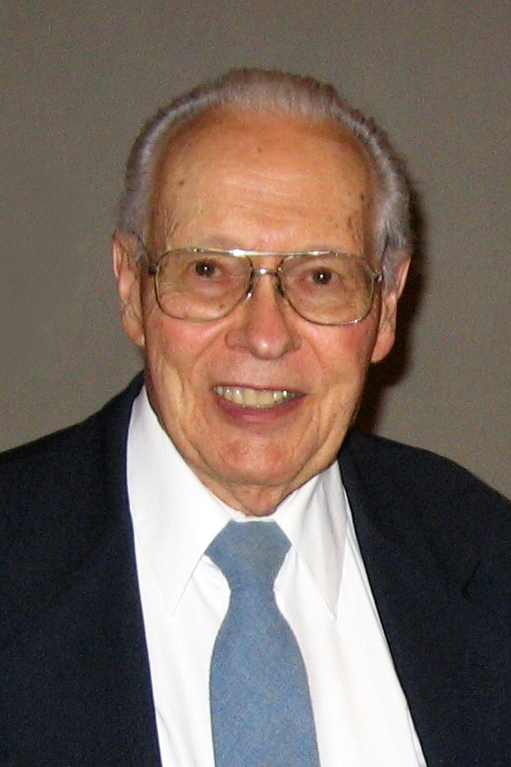
- Robert M. Cundick, March 2010

Background information
- Born: November 26, 1926; Salt Lake City, Utah
- Died: January 7, 2016 (aged 89)
- Education: University of Utah (BFA, MFA, PhD)
- Genres: Religious
- Occupations: Composer, musician
- Instrument: Organ
- Labels: Great American Gramophone; Argo
- Spouse: Charlotte "Cholly" Clark
- Awards: Pearl Award – Lifetime achievement 2004

Robert Milton Cundick Sr. (November 26, 1926 – January 7, 2016) was a Latter-day Saint composer and organist. Cundick's interest in music started at a young age, and he studied under Mormon Tabernacle organist Alexander Schreiner and later under Leroy J. Robertson. He also served for many years as an organist at the Salt Lake Tabernacle of the Church of Jesus Christ of Latter-day Saints (LDS Church). This included accompanying the Mormon Tabernacle Choir and playing organ solos on the weekly broadcast, Music & the Spoken Word. Cundick served in World War II and enrolled at the University of Utah where he received his BFA, MFA, and PhD. He joined the music faculty at Brigham Young University (BYU) in 1957 but his work there was interrupted due to various callings by LDS Church leaders. After his retirement, Cundick continued to contribute to music in the LDS Church. In his personal life, he married his organ student Charlotte Clark while he was a student at the University of Utah. He died in 2016 at the age of 89.

== Early life ==
Cundick was born in Salt Lake City, Utah, in 1926. He spent his childhood in Sandy, Utah. His parents, Milton and Florence Pierson Cundick, were both faithful and devoted members of the LDS Church, and the standards of the church were a major influence on his life. His interest in music began early in life as he played in bands and orchestras, as well as serving as the organist for weekly church services (by age 12 he had become organist for his congregation). As his organ skills progressed, he became a student of Mormon Tabernacle Organist Alexander Schreiner.

== Education ==
After serving in the United States Merchant Marine during World War II, Cundick immediately enrolled at the University of Utah, despite the fact that his Merchant Marine service was not covered by the G.I. Bill of Rights. Cundick worked to pay for his education, and received his BFA, MFA, and eventual PhD in Music Composition from the university. He studied under the tutelage of internationally famous composer Leroy J. Robertson.

It was during his time as a university student that Cundick married his wife, Charlotte (Cholly) Clark. Clark was an organ student of Cundick’s. The couple made their home in Salt Lake City, where Cundick was able to continue his university studies.

== Career ==
Cundick joined the music faculty at BYU in 1957.

In 1962, LDS Church president David O. McKay called Cundick and his family (including five children ages 5–11) to go to London, England, to serve as the organist at the new Hyde Park Chapel. While in England, Cundick appeared in concert at St. Paul's Cathedral and King's College, Cambridge, in addition to a BBC broadcast and his daily recitals at Hyde Park Chapel.

After completing this two-year mission, Cundick and his family returned to Provo, Utah, where he resumed his teaching and compositional activity at BYU. This was interrupted when Cundick was called to serve as an organist at the Salt Lake Tabernacle, located on Temple Square in Salt Lake City, Utah. He served for 27 years.

Following his retirement in 1991, Cundick and his wife were called to serve as Directors of Hosting at the BYU Jerusalem Center in Jerusalem.

After his retirement as Tabernacle Organist, Cundick sought to publicize serious works of Utah and Mormon composers. In 2004 he won the lifetime achievement Pearl Award. Cundick continued to devote much of his time to composition and other music related activities, always making time to serve those around him. In 2007 he released a CD containing compositions from over 50 years of his creativity. Cundick died January 7, 2016.

== Compositions ==
The current English LDS hymnal has two hymns with music by Cundick: hymn number 198, "That Easter Morn" (words by Marion D. Hanks), and hymn number 279, "Thy Holy Word", (words by Marvin K. Gardner). Cundick has written many vocal works, such as the cantata The Song of Nephi, as well as The Redeemer (widely viewed as his most significant work), an oratorio with the text selected by Brigham Young University professor Ralph Woodward. Cundick also provided music for the 2004 film Woman, The Pioneer, and he composed the music for The Brothers, a musical play based on the life of Karl G. Maeser, with text by Keith Engar. Most recently, Cundick composed the music to God's Everlasting Love, an oratorio with text by David A. Bednar, performed in the fall of 2009 by the BYU-Idaho choirs and orchestras.

== Sources ==
- Robert M. Cundick at the MLCA Database
- Article on Robert Cundick from Wiki at BYU College of Fine Arts
- "Deseret News, July 11, 2004". Deseret News (Salt Lake City) Newspaper. July 11, 2004. Archived from the original on March 23, 2005 – via FindArticles.
- Tantara Records listing for a CD of works by Cundick
- Mormon Tabernacle Choir listing on works arranged by Cundick that they performed
- listing of Cundick's work
- Barnes and Noble listing of works connected with Robert Cundick
- Mormon Scholars Testify: Robert Cundick
- The Deseret News - The Past Returns via CD (4 Feb 2007)
