= Joseph W. McMurrin =

American Mormon leader

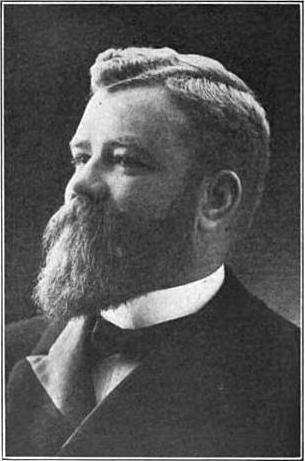

First Council of the Seventy
- October 5, 1897 – October 24, 1932
- Called by: Wilford Woodruff

Personal details
- Born: Joseph William McMurrin; September 5, 1858; Tooele, Utah Territory, United States
- Died: October 24, 1932 (aged 74); Los Angeles, California, United States

Joseph William McMurrin (September 5, 1858 – October 24, 1932) was a general authority and a member of the First Council of the Seventy of the Church of Jesus Christ of Latter-day Saints. He served as president of the California Mission of the LDS Church from 1919 until 1932.

Joseph W. McMurrin was married to Mary Ellen Hunter on April 1, 1880, and had seven children.

McMurrin was born in Tooele, Utah Territory. He was sustained one of the First Council of the Seventy on October 5, 1897. McMurrin was ordained a member of the Council of the 70 in 1898 in England.

Though born in Tooele, McMurrin was largely raised in Salt Lake City. He learned the trade of stone cutting and worked for a time as a stone cutter on the Salt Lake Temple when a teen.

In 1876 he was sent on a colonizing mission to St. Joseph, Arizona where he remained for two years. He then returned to Salt Lake City.

He then hauled freight from Salt Lake City to various mining camps. In 1881 he took up a contract with some associates to build a portion of the Oregon Short Line Railroad through Wyoming. While doing this he was called to serve an LDS mission in Great Britain. He served for 25 months in Scotland which was where his parents had originated from. Among many others he baptized two of his aunts.

After returning to Utah McMurrin was called as a home missionary, somewhat like modern ward missionaries. He also acted as a bodyguard to LDS Church leaders during the anti-polygamy crusade. In 1885 he was shot by a US Marshall through his vitals, but survived after being given a priesthood blessing by John Henry Smith.

In 1886 McMurrin went on another mission to England this time accompanied by his wife and 2 children. He was head of the London Conference for most of this mission.

In 1896 McMurrin was sent on a 3rd mission. This time he served as 1st counselor in the European Mission Presidency to Rulon S. Wells. Although based in Britain he traveled extensively to oversee missionary work in continental Europe as well. He was also one of the key people involved in pushing to have single women called as missionaries.

He died in Los Angeles, California on October 24, 1932.

== Notes ==
- Andrew Jenson. LDS Biographical Encyclopedia. Vol. 1, p. 116.
