= First Presidency's Christmas Devotional =

The First Presidency's Christmas Devotional (changed in 2014 from First Presidency Christmas Devotional) is an annual broadcast from the Conference Center of the Church of Jesus Christ of Latter-day Saints in Salt Lake City. It is generally held the evening of the first Sunday in December to begin the Christmas season. Traditionally the meeting has consisted of music from the Tabernacle Choir and Orchestra at Temple Square. In the past, the speakers consisted solely of members of the First Presidency, but has changed in more recent years. In 2015, one speaker was pulled from each of the Presidency of the Seventy, the Relief Society General Presidency, the Quorum of the Twelve Apostles, and the First Presidency. Messages usually reflect the Christmas season and may focus on love, service, and Jesus Christ.
