= Joy to the World (Mormon Tabernacle Choir album) =

Live album by Mormon Tabernacle Choir
- Released: 1970
- Recorded: 1970
- Genre: Christmas
- Length: 45:08
- Label: Columbia Masterworks, CBS Records, Sony Masterworks

Joy to the World is a Gold album record featuring the Mormon Tabernacle Choir singing classic songs of faith and hope, accompanied by the Philadelphia Brass Ensemble and organist Alexander Schreiner. The album was released as We Wish You A Merry Christmas on CBS Records in the UK in 1976. On January 15, 1985, it was RIAA certified as a Gold album. It was later reissued in 2002 with three bonus tracks (the last three tracks).

== Track listing ==
No.	Title	Length
1.	"Joy to the World"	2:11
2.	"The First Noel"	3:03
3.	"Deck the Hall"	1:40
4.	"Carol of the Bells"	2:28
5.	"O Come, O Come, Emmanuel"	3:26
6.	"We Wish You a Merry Christmas"	1:58
7.	"O Come, All Ye Faithful"	3:36
8.	"O Holy Night"	2:34
9.	"Hark! The Herald Angels Sing"	3:27
10.	"Here We Come A-Caroling"	1:38
11.	"O Tannenbaum"	3:29
12.	"Silent Night"	4:34
13.	"Have Yourself a Merry Little Christmas"	3:53
14.	"The Christmas Song (Chestnuts Roasting on an Open Fire)"	4:02
15.	"Hallelujah Chorus"	4:00
Total length:		45:08
