= Mark Custom Recording Service =

Mark Custom Recording Service, Inc., is an American recording and production company for music of collegiate, scholastic, military, civic, and professional groups. It was founded in 1962 by Vincent S. Morette (1936–1989) and incorporated in the State of New York in 1968. Mark is based in Clarence, New York.

== History ==
At its founding, Vincent S. Morette capitalized on the growing miniaturization of recording technology on the 1960s to provide live, on-site recordings for college and secondary school ensembles as well as concerts at clinics and workshops. The original company has since expanded into CD manufacturing, custom art work, and studio recording. Since 1990 they have provided recordings of ACDA conferences, performances at the Midwest Clinic and the All-State high school festivals in such states as Texas, New York, and Indiana. They have also recorded National and State Music conferences in Florida, Kentucky, and Illinois.

On-site recording allowed schools and universities to record their ensembles and performances by professional engineers and have those recordings produced and distributed by a professional service. Live concert recordings are also important as historical records of festival events. Such recordings often feature repertoire not recorded by traditional labels. The live recordings of festival concerts also serve as the sonic equivalents of a memorial photographs providing a tangible memento of the event.

== Ownership and personnel ==
The company is currently owned by Cecelia M. Morette (born 1939; née Charvella) and Mark J. Morette (born 1963), wife and son of the founder, respectively. Mark Morette, the namesake of the firm, has been running the company since 1989.

== Awards ==
- 2001, Buffalo Philharmonic Orchestra award for “Outstanding service to Music Education”
- 2004, International Percy Grainger Society’s “Grainger Medallion” to Mark Morette for lifetime dedication and commitment in preserving and promoting the music of Percy A. Grainger (http://www.percygrainger.org/)
- 2008, NYSBDA "New York State Band Director’s Association" awarded Mark the “Outstanding Service” Award for lifetime dedication to the promotion of Wind Band music
- 2009–2011, Kappa Kappa Psi's Distinguished Service to Music Medal in the area of Industry to Mark Morette
- Phi Beta Mu awarded Mark with the International Bandmaster’s Fraternity’s “Outstanding Contributor Award”
- Mark Custom Recording Service, Inc. has had over 320 Grammy Entry List appearances for his recordings, producing, and Mark Records releases. Mark Records has been twice nominated for a Grammy.
