= Jackman Music Corporation =

Sheet music publishing company

Jackman Music is a sheet music publishing company that is based in Bountiful, Utah. They specialize in publishing Latter-day Saint themed religious music for choirs, pianists, organists, and a variety of instrumentalists.

Jackman Music was founded by Jerry and Carole Jackman in 1975 and has since grown to become the leading publisher of LDS print music, publishing over 1800 individual titles.

== See also ==
- Mormon folk music
- Mormon music
- Music of Utah

== Sources ==
- Spencer, Emily (January 12, 2011), "A Piece's Journey: Understanding and Appreciating What Went into the Music You Now Hold in Your Hands", ldsmusicuniverse.com, LDS Music Universe / M Ryan Taylor, archived from the original on August 30, 2011
- Card, Orson Scott (January 29, 2009), "Songs affirm our heritage", Deseret News, archived from the original on March 4, 2016
- "Spring Music Workshop at Y.", Deseret News, March 23, 2007, archived from the original on January 21, 2013
- Johnston, Jerry (July 10, 1999), "Simple is better in hymns -- and people", Deseret News, archived from the original on January 22, 2013
- "David Glen Hatch: Covenant Pianist To Appear In Concert SCERA On Friday", Deseret News, August 15, 1994, archived from the original on September 28, 2018
