= Schoenstein & Co. =

- Type: Privately owned company
- Industry: Musical instrument manufacturing company
- Founded: 1877
- Founder: Felix F. Schoenstein
- Headquarters: 4001 Industrial Way, Benicia, California, United States
- Key people: Bryan Dunnewald, President and Tonal Director
- Products: Pipe organ
- Services: Custom-building organs and renovation of existing organs, particularly those of historical merit.
- Website: www.schoenstein.com

- Schoenstein and Company Pipe Organ Factory
- U.S. National Register of Historic Places
- San Francisco Designated Landmark
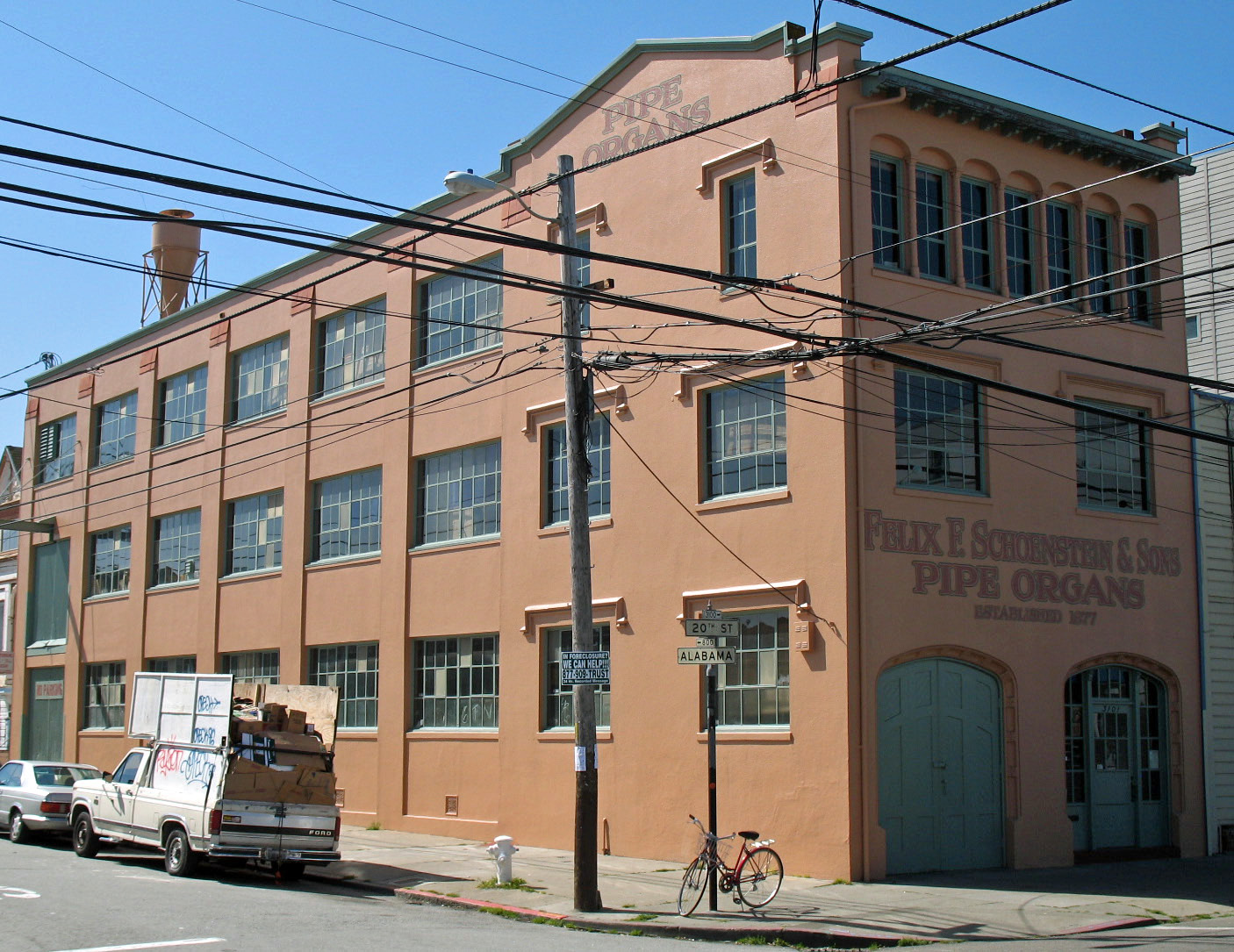
- Original Schoenstein factory building
- Location: 3101 20th Street, San Francisco, California, U.S.
- Built: 1928
- Architect: Mager Brothers
- Architectural style: Mission/Spanish Revival
- NRHP reference No.: 78000759
- SFDL No.: 99

Significant dates
- Added to NRHP: November 14, 1978
- Designated SFDL: August 13, 1977

Schoenstein & Co. formerly known as Felix F. Shoenstein and Sons, is the oldest and largest organ builder in the western United States. It was founded in 1877 by Felix F. Schoenstein in San Francisco, California; the company is now based in Benicia, California.

An early factory (no longer used by Schoenstein & Co.) in San Francisco is one of the few factories built for organ-building and the building is listed on the National Register of Historic Places, under the name "Schoenstein and Company Pipe Organ Factory" since 1978; and is listed as a San Francisco Designated Landmark, under the name "Schoenstein Organ" since 1977.

== About ==
The Schoenstein & Co. headquarters and main plant are in Benicia, northeast of San Francisco.

The company has built organs throughout the United States and Canada, as well as repairing and renovating numerous organs, particularly after the San Francisco earthquake and fire of 1906. Clients include the Boston Symphony Orchestra, the Eastman School of Music, the Kennedy Center, and the Washington National Cathedral.

In 2004, organs could cost from US$100,000 to several million dollars; and most of those made by Schoenstein around that time roughly cost US$500,000.

== History ==
Schoenstein & Co. was founded in San Francisco, California by Felix F. Schoenstein, an immigrant from the Black Forest–area in Germany. For five generations the Schoenstein family engaged in the construction and maintenance of pipe organs. Leo Schoenstein began the practice of making organs in Germany before 1850. He was joined by his sons who started the production of orchestrions, a mechanically played organ, in 1864.

Two of Leo's sons travelled to the United States in 1868 to install an organ in a San Francisco beer garden, and Felix Schoenstein remained in San Francisco. Shortly afterward Felix Schoenstein began working with an early California organ builder, Joseph Mayer. After eight years as a foreman with the Mayer enterprise, he left to establish his own business. Three of Felix's ten children, Louis, Erwin and Otto, joined the firm and in 1909 the business was reorganized under the name Felix F. Shoenstein and Sons.

In 1977, the company was purchased by Jack Bethards, who had previous had a career in marketing but he calls himself "a pipe-organ nut." In 2004, the company relocated their headquarters and manufacturing plant to Benicia. At the time of their move and for a few years after, the company maintained a presence in the San Francisco building.

Bryan Dunnewald assumed the role of President and Tonal Director in 2024 after several years at the firm. Trained as an orchestral conductor and organist, Dunnewald maintains the company's tradition of musicians in leadership.

The company's largest organ was built in 2003 for the 21,333-seat Conference Center for the Church of Jesus Christ of Latter-day Saints in Salt Lake City.

== List of Schoenstein & Co. organs ==
- Trinity Episcopal Church, San Francisco, California, a San Francisco Designated Landmark
- Philadelphian Seventh-day Adventist Church, San Francisco, California
- Holy Cross Church, San Francisco, California, damaged after the 1906 earthquake (now the Macang Monastery)
- Congregations Sherith Israel, San Francisco, California
- Congregation Emanu-El, San Francisco, California
- Church of the Incarnation, Santa Rosa, California
- Our Lady of Lourdes Church, Oakland, California (formerly at St. Francis de Sales Cathedral)
- The Church of St. Michael & St. George, St. Louis, MO
- St. Martin's Episcopal Church, Houston, Texas
- St. James Episcopal Church, New York City, New York
- Christ Church, Cambridge, Massachusetts
- Schoenstein Organ at the conference center (2003), The Church of Jesus Christ of Latter-day Saints, Salt Lake City, Utah

== Gallery ==
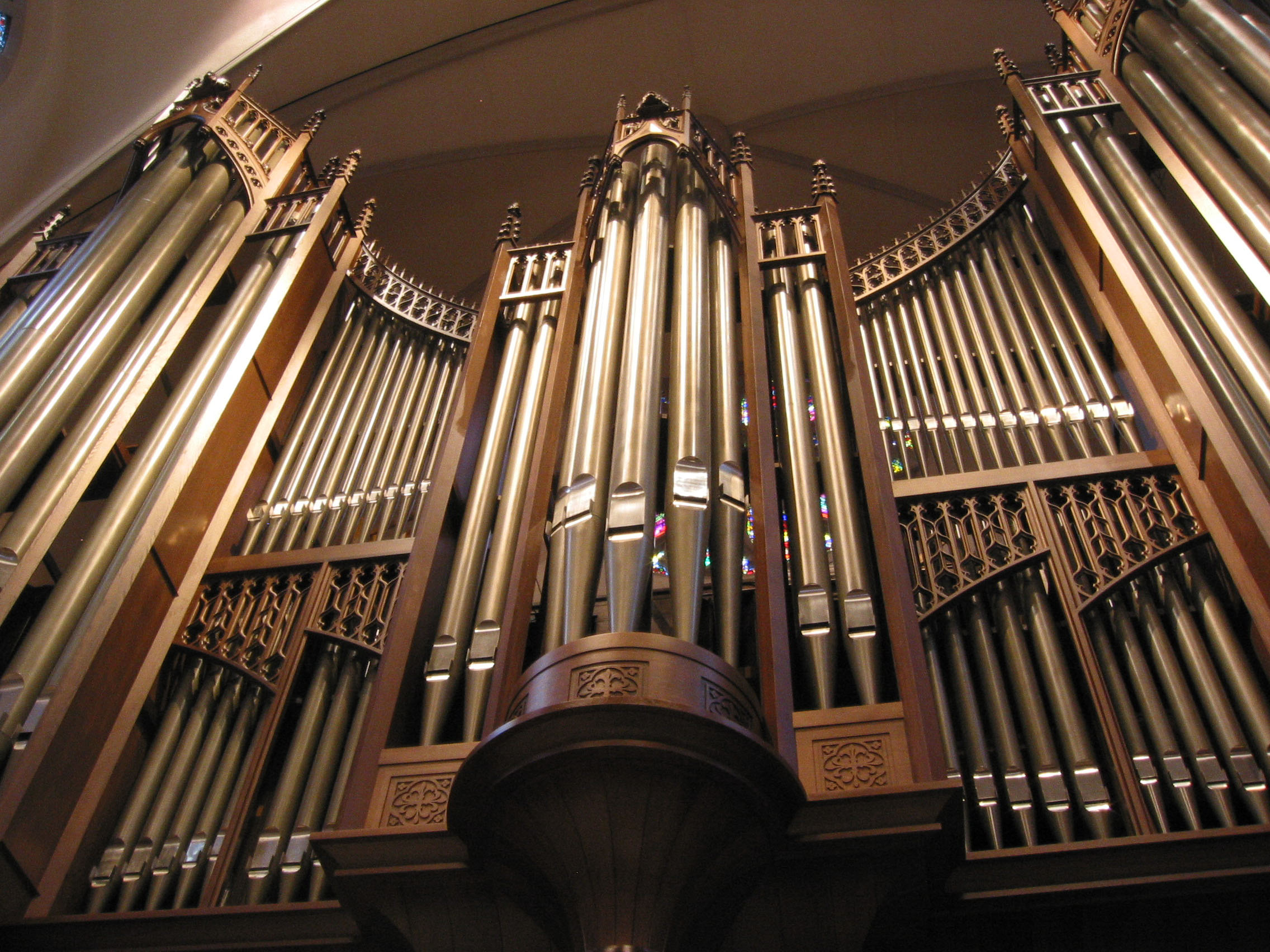
St. Martin's Episcopal Church organ in Houston, Texas

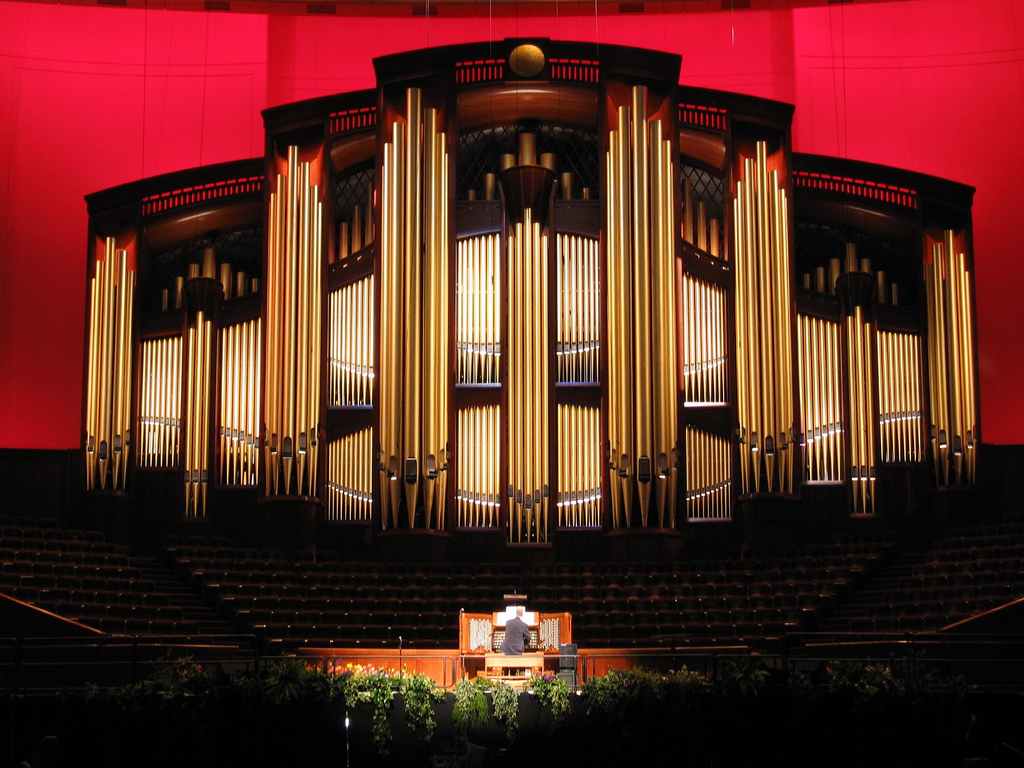
LDS Conference Center organ

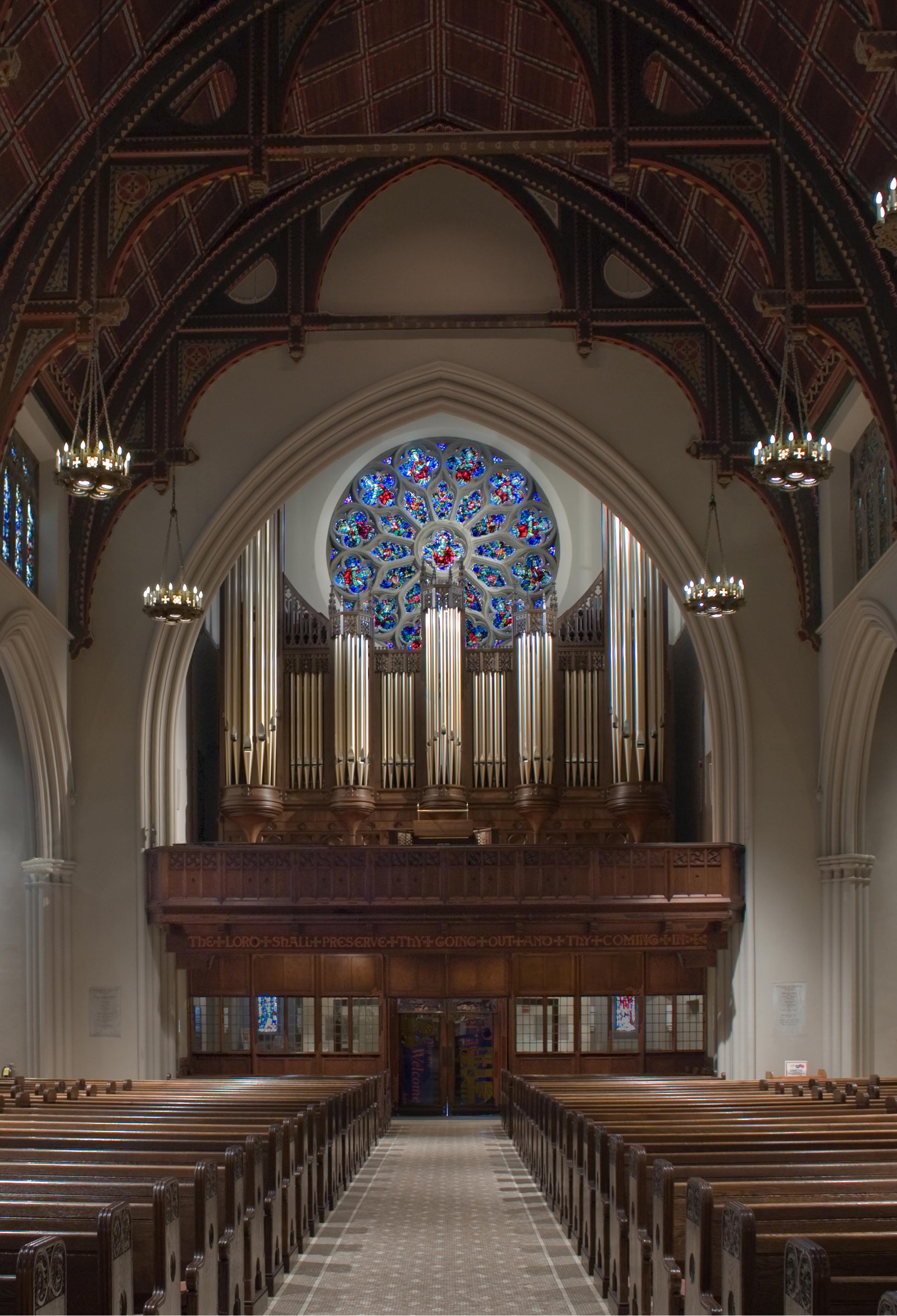
St. James Episcopal Church, New York City

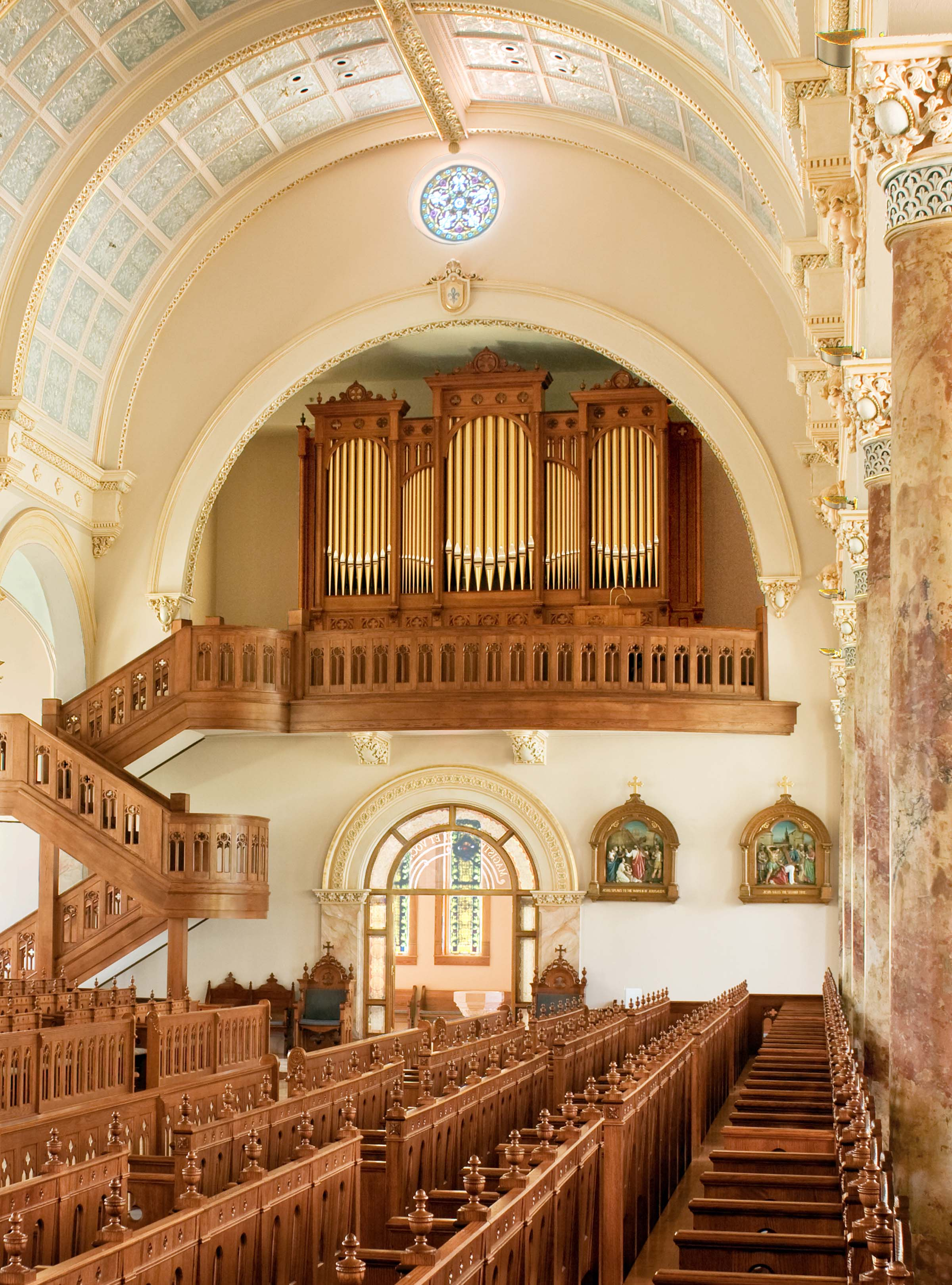
Chapel of the Incarnate Word, San Antonio, Texas

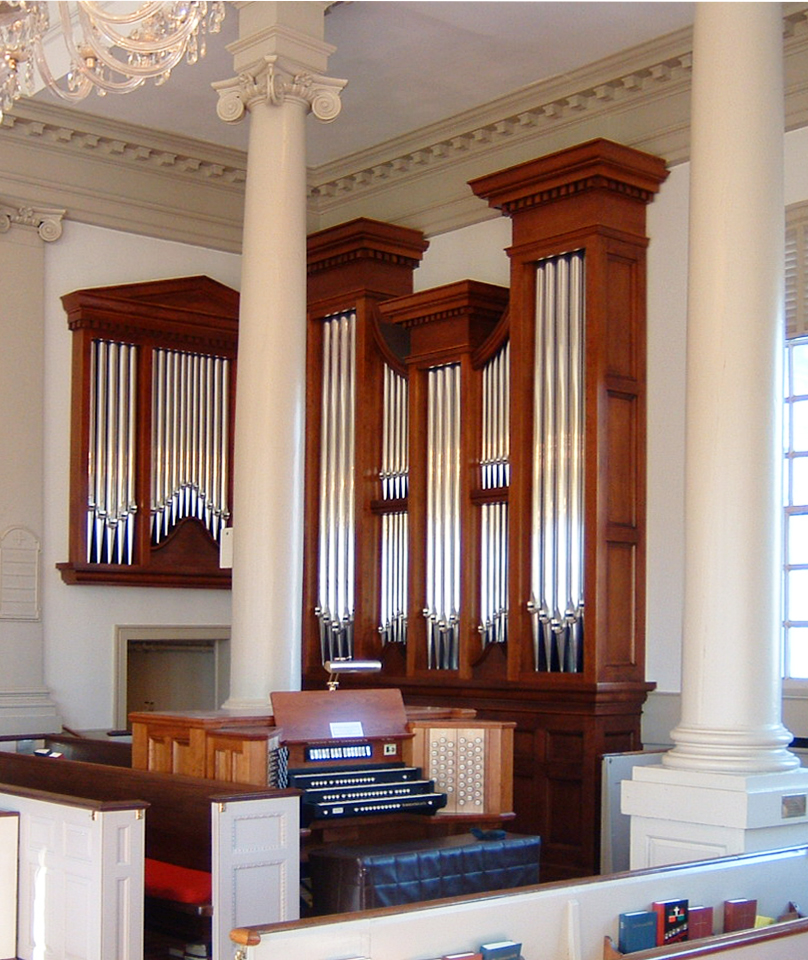
Christ Church, Cambridge, Massachusetts
