= Keep Christmas with You =

2015 live album by Mormon Tabernacle Choir

Live album by Mormon Tabernacle Choir featuring Santino Fontana and The Muppets from Sesame Street
- Released: October 16, 2015
- Recorded: December 2014
- Genre: Christmas
- Length: 70:45
- Label: Mormon Tabernacle Choir
- Producers: Mack Wilberg, Ryan T. Murphy

Mormon Tabernacle Choir chronology
Let The Season In (2014)	Keep Christmas with You (2015)	Hallelujah! (2016)

Professional ratings
Review scores
Source	Rating
Deseret News	(very favorable)

Keep Christmas with You is an album recorded during the Mormon Tabernacle Choir's 2014 Christmas shows in the LDS Conference Center, with special guests actor Santino Fontana (Frozen's Hans) and The Muppets from Sesame Street. The album and concert DVD were released on October 16, 2015. The recorded concert premiered on PBS on December 21, 2015.

== DVD Menu ==
DVD
No.	Title	Performer(s)	Length
1.	"Sing a Christmas Carol from Scrooge"	Choir and Orchestra, Brass Band, Sesame Street Muppets	3:09
2.	"Merry, Merry Christmas"	Choir, Orchestra, and Bells	6:04
3.	"The Candy Man from Willy Wonka & the Chocolate Factory/Pocketful of Miracles"	Santino Fontana, Choir, Orchestra, and Bells	3:42
4.	"Some Children See Him"	Santino Fontana and Orchestra	3:35
5.	"Marche Miniature from Suite for Orchestra in D Minor, op. 43"	Orchestra	1:46
6.	"Hear, King of Angels from Christmas Oratorio, BWV 248"	Choir and Orchestra	1:53
7.	"Cum Sancto Spiritu from Petite messe solennelle"	Choir and Orchestra	5:36
8.	"Sesame Street Theme Song"	The Sesame Street Tabernacle Choir Orchestra	1:21
9.	"People in Your Neighborhood"	Santino Fontana, Sesame Street Muppets, and Orchestra	5:33
10.	"Sing"	Santino Fontana, Sesame Street Muppets, Choir, and Orchestra	2:49
11.	"The Wonder of Winter (Medley) (Let it Snow, White Christmas, Silver Bells, Sleigh Ride, Blue Christmas, Winter Wonderland, Jingle Bells)"	Santino Fontana, Choir, and Orchestra	5:27
12.	"The Twelve Days of Christmas"	Count von Count	9:14
13.	"Keep Christmas with You"	Sesame Street Muppets, Choir, and Orchestra ft. Katie Bastian	2:43
14.	"Everyone Who Likes Christmas Say, "I Do!""	Santino Fontana, Sesame Street Muppets, Choir, and Orchestra	3:53
15.	"Infant Holy, Infant Lowly"	Choir and Orchestra	4:31
16.	"Luke 2: The Christmas Story"	Santino Fontana and Orchestra	2:34
17.	"Angels, from the Realms of Glory"	Santino Fontana, Choir, and Orchestra	4:27
18.	"We Wish You a Merry Christmas"	Santino Fontana, Sesame Street Muppets, Choir, and Orchestra	2:28
