= Once Upon a Christmas (Mormon Tabernacle Choir album) =

Live album by Mormon Tabernacle Choir featuring Jane Seymour and Nathan Gunn
- Released: September 4, 2012
- Recorded: 2011
- Genre: Christmas
- Label: Mormon Tabernacle Choir
- Producer: Mack Wilberg, Ryan T. Murphy, Bruce Leek, Fred Vogler

Mormon Tabernacle Choir chronology
Glad Christmas Tidings (2011)	Once Upon a Christmas (2012)	Home for the Holidays (2013)

Once Upon a Christmas was recorded during the Mormon Tabernacle Choir's 2011 Christmas shows in the LDS Conference Center with special guests Jane Seymour and Nathan Gunn. The album was released on September 4, 2012 along with a concert DVD. A book titled Good King Wenceslas illustrated by Omar Rayyan and accompanying DVD featuring Jane Seymour introducing and narrating the story also released in conjunction with the album release. The recorded concert was broadcast on PBS during December 2012 to more than 4 million Americans.

== Track listing ==
CD
No.	Title	Performer(s)	Length
1.	"Deck The Halls"	Choir, Orchestra, and Bells	2:07
2.	"Processional: Sing Forth This Day"	Jane Seymour, Choir, Orchestra, and Bells	6:41
3.	"In dulci jubilo"	Nathan Gunn with Choir, Orchestra, and Bells	3:00
4.	"Sing Lullaby"	Nathan Gunn with Orchestra	4:50
5.	"Domine fili unigenite, from Gloria"	Choir and Orchestra	1:22
6.	"Mighty Lord, and King All-Glorious, from Christmas Oratorio, BWV 248"	Nathan Gunn and Orchestra	2:03
7.	"Ah! Dearest Jesus, from Christmas Oratorio, BWV 248"	Choir and Orchestra	1:18
8.	"And God Said: The Day Shall Dawn, from King David"	Choir and Orchestra	3:55
9.	"’Twas the Night before Christmas"	Nathan Gunn, Choir, Orchestra, and Bells	7:54
10.	"A Wintry Mix: Winter Wonderland, White Christmas, Let it Snow!"	Nathan Gunn, Choir and Orchestra	5:33
11.	"Shepherds’ Dance"	Richard Elliott	2:38
12.	"Silent Night"	Nathan Gunn with Choir and Orchestra	4:05
13.	"Luke 2: The Christmas Story"	Jane Seymour with Orchestra	2:22
14.	"Angels, from the Realms of Glory"	Nathan Gunn with Choir, Orchestra, and Bells	4:26
15.	"Good King Wenceslas"	Jane Seymour with Choir, Orchestra, and Bells	17:42
Total length:			59:49

== Charts ==
Chart (2012)	Peak position
Billboard Holiday	20
Billboard Classical	3
Billboard Christian	38
