= Salt Lake Tabernacle organ =

Pipe organ in Salt Lake City, Utah, US

Salt Lake Tabernacle Organ
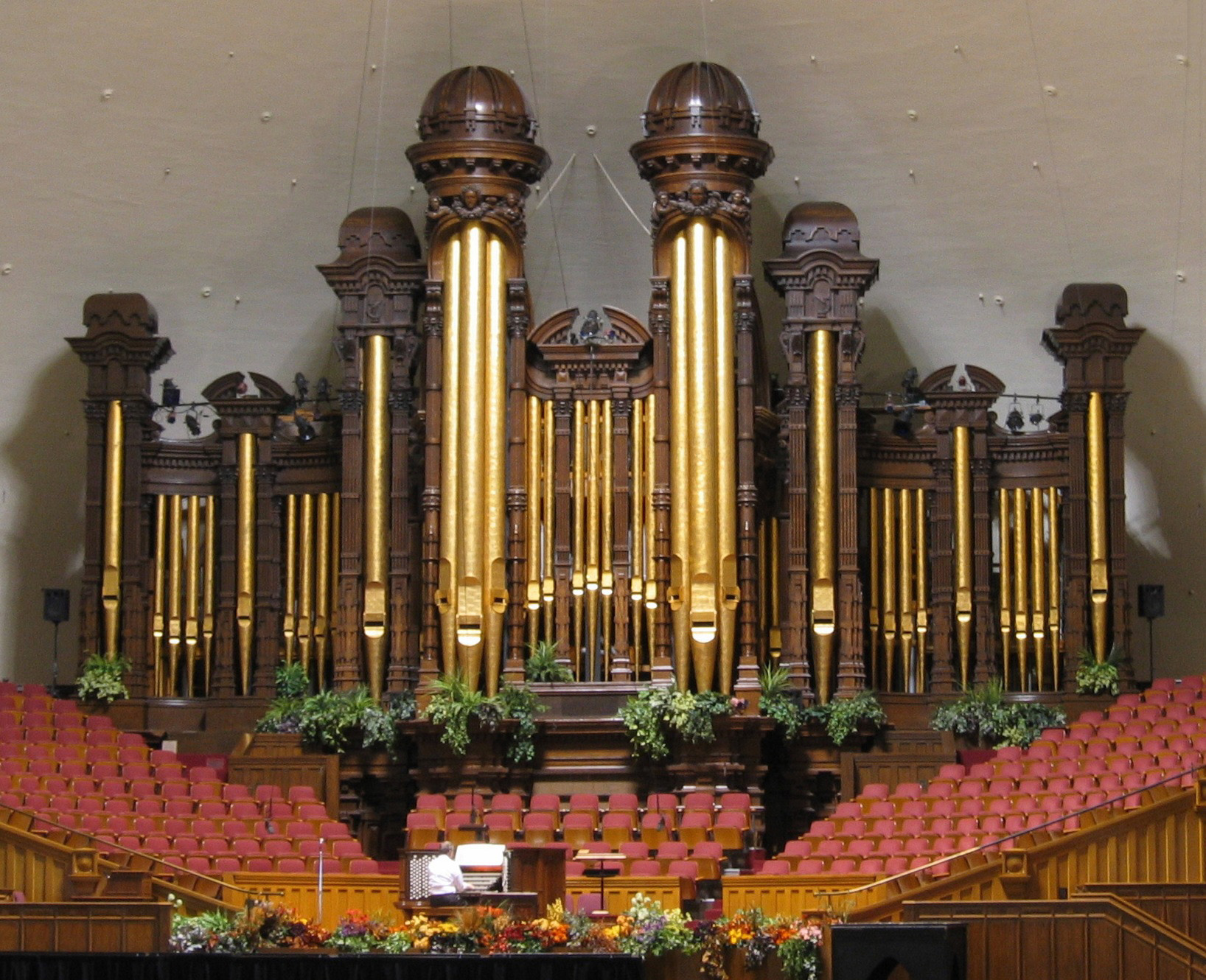

Background information
- Origin: Salt Lake City, Utah, U.S.
- Genres: Worship, classical
- Years active: 1867; 159 years ago to present
- Label: The Tabernacle Choir at Temple Square
- Website: www.thetabernaclechoir.org/about/organs/organ-information/tabernacle.html

The Salt Lake Tabernacle organ is a pipe organ located in the Salt Lake Tabernacle in Salt Lake City, Utah. Along with the nearby Conference Center organ, it is typically used to accompany the Tabernacle Choir at Temple Square and is also featured in daily noon recitals. It is one of the largest organs in the world. Jack Bethards, president and tonal director of Schoenstein & Co., describes it as an "American classic organ" and "probably one of the most perfect organs ever built."

== Construction ==
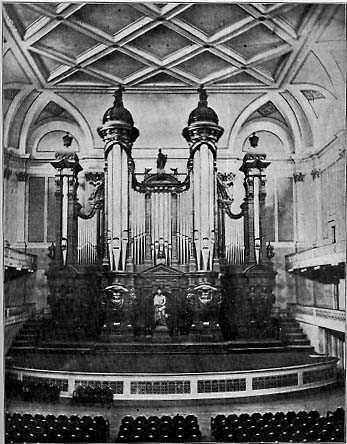
The Boston Music Hall Organ

The Tabernacle organ is considered to be one of the finest examples of the American Classic style of organ building. The casework was inspired by the design of the Boston Music Hall organ (which is now housed, since 1909, at the Methuen Memorial Music Hall), the original organ was built in 1863-1867 by an Englishman, Joseph Ridges. Ridges' instrument contained some 700 pipes and was constructed of locally derived materials as much as possible. This original modest 2 manual organ had its console attached to the lower central part of the case and its action was tracker. The organ was later rebuilt and enlarged first by Niels Johnson (1889), the Kimball company of Chicago (1901), the Austin company of Hartford (1915, 1926 & 1937) and finally by the Aeolian-Skinner organ company of Boston (1948). The organ today is largely the result of the personal involvement of noted Anglo-American organ builder G. Donald Harrison, president of the Aeolian-Skinner organ firm when the tabernacle organ was installed. His collaboration with legendary Tabernacle organist Alexander Schreiner produced this masterwork of American eclectic organ building.

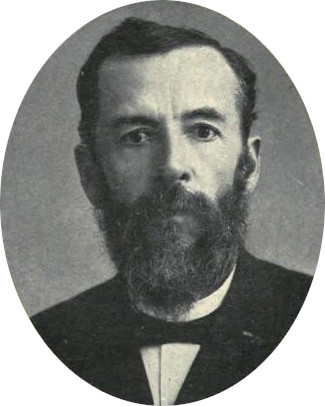
Joseph H. Ridges (1827-1914), the organ's original builder

From 1984 to 1988, the organ was meticulously renovated by the Schoenstein organ company of San Francisco, under the leadership of Jack M. Bethards. Issues of balance, tonal regulation, and various mechanical details which had developed or become evident in the preceding 40 years of use were corrected and 17 ranks of new pipework were added to complete and enhance the tonal scheme.

The original iconic façade was expanded with side wings in 1915 by the Fetzer woodworking company of Salt Lake City and remains in that form today.

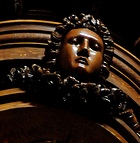
Top of one of the organ pipes

The pipes are constructed of wood, zinc, and various alloys of tin and lead. Several pipe ranks from the Ridges organ are extant in the instrument today. When it was initially constructed, the organ had tracker action and was powered by hand-pumped bellows; later it was powered by water from City Creek. Today it is powered by electricity and has electro-pneumatic action.

The organ as it stands today contains 11,623 pipes, 147 speaking stops and 206 ranks (sets of pipes).

== Renovation ==
A major renovation of the Salt Lake Tabernacle took place from 2004-2007. During this timeline, the Tabernacle Organ received its first major overhaul. The front façade pipes were gilded. Much of the organ was disassembled for cleaning and inspection. The organ's underground wind lines and air chambers were moved for the seismic upgrades and installation of sub-basement offices. The main console, which needed extensive repairs, was replaced with an exact electrified replica, eliminating the latency that was present between the old non-electric console and pipes. The organ also received a tune-up, to 440hz, standardizing it to modern concert pitch.

== Uses ==
The organ often accompanies the Tabernacle Choir at Temple Square during its weekly radio and television broadcasts of Music and the Spoken Word. It also appears in other concerts, recitals, and in recordings. Since the 1920s it has been traditional to feature the organ in daily half-hour solo recitals at noon. During the busy tourist summer season the noon recitals are repeated at 2 pm. The Church of Jesus Christ of Latter-day Saints used the organ to accompany music for its biannual general conferences until April 2000, when the church opened its newly constructed Conference Center across the street to the north, which has its own 7708-pipe organ.

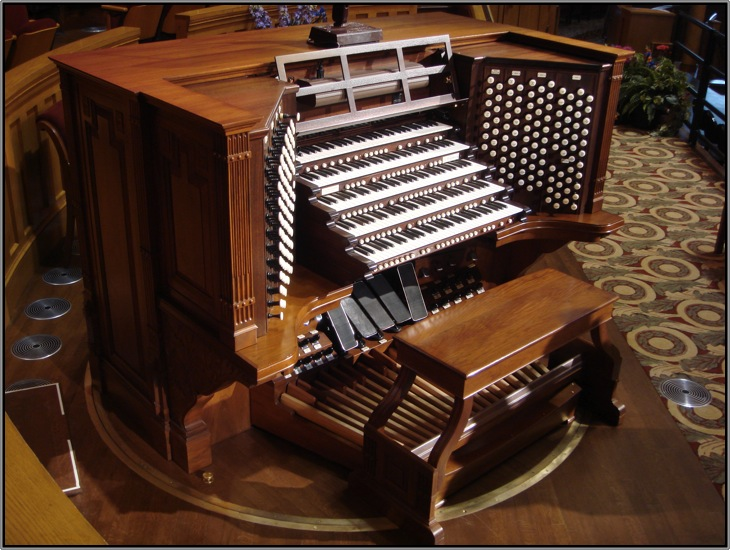
The organ console

Apart from its use by organists of the Tabernacle Choir, guest artists are often invited to perform on the instrument, including Dame Gillian Weir (2007), John Weaver (2007) and Felix Hell (2008). During the COVID-19 pandemic the organ was highlighted in the online series “Piping Up: Organ Concerts at Temple Square" featuring organists streamed on YouTube.

The first recordings of the organ were made by Tabernacle organist John J. McClellan for the Columbia Graphophone Company in 1910 and are the first commercially released recordings of a pipe organ. Many recordings featuring the tabernacle organists and choir have been made over subsequent years and are readily available. In 2020, the organ was used as a graphic element of the new Tabernacle Choir logo identity.

== List of stops ==
I. Choir
Gamba	16′
Principal	8′
Concert Flute	8′
Viola	8′
Viola Celeste	8′
Dulcet II	8′
Kleine Erzähler II	8′
Prestant	4′
Zauberflöte	4′
Gambette	4′
Piccolo Harmonique	2′
Fife (Carillon)	1′
Sesquialtera (Carillon) II
Carillon III
Rauschpfeife III
Dulzian	16′
Trompette	8′
Krummhorn	8′
Orchestral Oboe	8′
Rohr Schalmei	4′
Tromp. Harm. (Bomb.)	8′
Tremulant

I. Positiv
Principal	8′
Cor de Nuit	8′
Quintade	8′
Principal	4′
Nachthorn	4′
Nazard	2 ^{2}/_{3}′
Principal	2′
Spillflöte	2′
Tierce	1 ^{3}/_{5}′
Larigot	1 ^{1}/_{3}′
Sifflöte	1′
Septerz II
Scharf III
Zimbel III
Rankett	16′
Cromorne	8′
Tremulant

II. Great
Subprincipal	16′
Quintaton	16′
Principal	8′
Diapason	8′
Montre	8′
Bourdon	8′
Spitzflöte	8′
Flûte Harmonique	8′
Bell Gamba	8′
Grosse Quinte	5 ^{1}/_{3}′
Principal	4′
Octave	4′
Koppelflöte	4′
Flûte Octaviante	4′
Gemshorn	4′
Grosse Tierce	3 ^{1}/_{5}′
Quinte	2 ^{2}/_{3}′
Super Octave	2′
Blockflöte	2′
Tierce	1 ^{3}/_{5}′
Septieme	1 ^{1}/_{7}′
Acuta III
Full Mixture IV
Fourniture IV
Kleine Mixtur IV
Cornet V
Double Trumpet	16′
Trumpet	8′
Clarion	4′

III. Swell
Lieblich Gedeckt	16′
Gemshorn	16′
Geigen Principal	8′
Gedeckt	8′
Claribel Flute	8′
Flauto Dolce	8′
Flute Celeste	8′
Viole de Gambe	8′
Viole Celeste	8′
Orchestral Strings II	8′
Salicional	8′
Voix Celeste	8′
Prestant	4′
Fugara	4′
Flauto Traverso	4′
Nazard	2 ^{2}/_{3}′
Octavin	2′
Hohlflöte	2′
Cornet III
Cymbale IV
Plein Jeu IV (from Plein Jeu VI)
Plein Jeu VI
Contra Fagot	32′
Contre Trompette	16′
1ere Trompette	8′
2eme Trompette	8′
Hautbois	8′
Voix Humaine	8′
Quinte Trompette	5 ^{1}/_{3}′
Clairon	4′
Tremulant

IV. Bombarde
Diapason	8′
Octave	4′
Grosse Cornet IV–VI
Grande Fourniture VI
Bombarde	16′
Trompette Harmonique	8′
Trompette	8′
Clairon	4′

IV. Solo
Flauto Mirabilis	8′
Gamba	8′
Gamba Celeste	8′
Concert Flute	4′
Nazard	2 ^{2}/_{3}′
Piccolo	2′
Tierce	1 ^{3}/_{5}′
French Horn	8′
English Horn	8′
Corno di Bassetto	8′
Tuba	8′
Cornet V (Great)	8′
Harp	8′
Chimes
Celesta (Harp)
Tremulant

V. Antiphonal
Diapason	8′
Gedeckt	8′
Salicional	8′
Voix Celeste	8′
Principal	4′
Kleine Mixtur III
Trompette	8′
Vox Humana	8′
Tuba Mirabilis	8′
Cornet (Great) V
Tremulant

Percussion

Chimes on Great
Chimes on Pedal
Harp on Choir
Celesta on Choir

Pedal
Montre	32′
Flûte Ouverte	32′
Contre Bourdon	32′
Principal	16′
Flûte Ouverte	16′
Contre Basse	16′
Violone	16′
Bourdon	16′
Gemshorn (Swell)	16′
Gamba (Choir)	16′
Lieblich Gedeckt (Swell)	16′
Grosse Quinte	10 ^{2}/_{3}′
Principal	8′
Violoncello	8′
Spitzprincipal	8′
Flûte Ouverte	8′
Flauto Dolce	8′
Gamba (Choir)	8′
Lieblich Gedeckt (Swell)	8′
Quinte	5 ^{1}/_{3}′
Choral Bass	4′
Nachthorn	4′
Gamba (Choir)	4′
Lieblich Gedeckt (Swell)	4′
Principal	2′
Blockflöte	2′
Full Mixture IV
Cymbale IV
Grand Harmonics V
Bombarde	32′
Contra Fagot (Swell)	32′
Ophicleide	16′
Trombone	16′
Double Trumpet (Great)	16′
Contre Tompette (Swell)	16′
Dulzian (Choir)	16′
Posaune	8′
Trumpet	8′
Double Trumpet (Great)	8′
Contre Trompette (Swell)	8′
Krummhorn (Choir)	8′
Clarion	4′
Chalumeau	4′
Kornett	2′
