= Alexander Schreiner =

German organist (1901–1987)

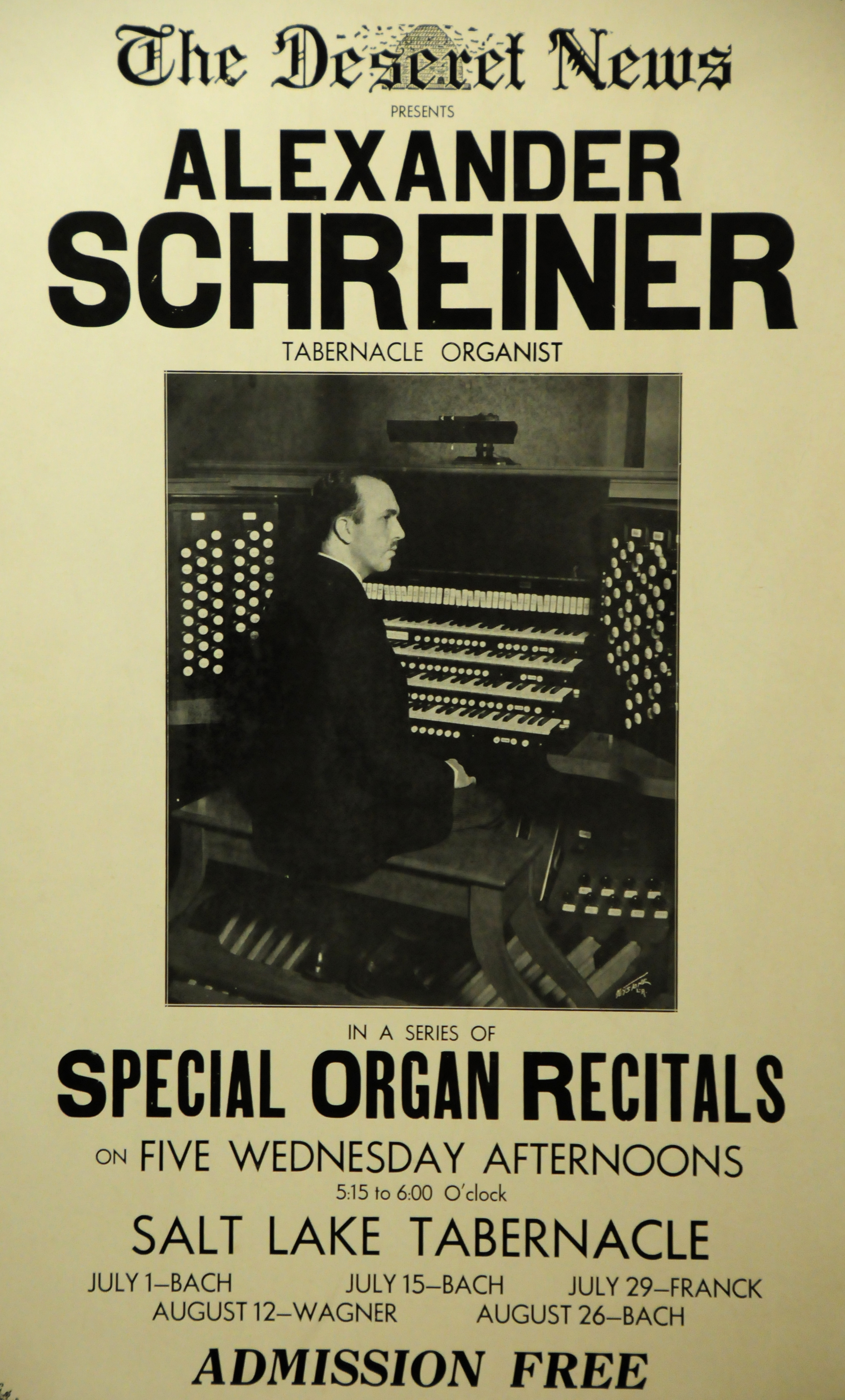

Alexander Ferdinand Schreiner (July 31, 1901 – September 15, 1987) was one of the most noted organists of the Salt Lake Tabernacle. He also wrote the music to several LDS hymns, several of which are in the current edition of the hymn book of the Church of Jesus Christ of Latter-day Saints (LDS Church).

== Early life ==
Schreiner was born in Nuremberg, Germany. His parents were Johann Christian Schreiner and Margarethe Schwemmer. Johann and Margarethe joined the LDS Church in 1903, and the local congregation held meetings in the family's home. Schreiner performed in public for the first time at age five, and after he was baptized at age eight was almost immediately appointed as a Sunday School organist. In 1912 Schreiner moved with his family to Salt Lake City. Among his early instructors on the organ was John J. McClellan.

Schreiner first performed on an organ professionally during the fall of 1917 at the American Theater of Salt Lake City. In 1920, just after graduating from high school, he took a job as a theater organist at the Rialto Theatre in Butte, Montana. Schreiner first performed in the Salt Lake Tabernacle at age 20. That same year he left on a mission to California. He served as a missionary under Joseph W. McMurrin. In early 1924, he was presiding over the Los Angeles Conference which had 35 missionaries.

In 1924, just after returning from his mission, Schreiner was appointed an assistant organist of the Salt Lake Mormon Tabernacle. Six months later Schreiner took a leave of absence from this appointment to go to Paris to further his musical studies with Henri Libert, Charles-Marie Widor and Louis Vierne. In Paris, Schreiner would associate with other Utahns at the home of James L. Barker.

Schreiner married Margaret Lyman, the daughter of Richard R. Lyman and Amy Brown Lyman, in 1927. They had gone to high school together, but did not really start dating until they were both studying in Paris.

== California career ==
After his studies in France, Schreiner returned to his position as organist in Salt Lake City from July 1926 to January 1927. He then went to southern California to earn enough money to pay off his debts and be in a position to marry Margaret. He served as organist at Grauman's Metropolitan Theatre. The following June he returned to Salt Lake City and he and Margaret married, after which they returned to southern California. During this time period Schreiner also worked as an organist at the Barker Brother's Department Store.

In August 1928, Schreiner once again returned to Salt Lake City, where he resumed his position as Tabernacle Organist and also served as the chief organist at the Capitol Theatre.

In 1929 Schreiner returned to southern California in an attempt to overcome his influenza. He was appointed chief organist of the First Methodist Episcopal Church in Los Angeles. Schreiner returned to Salt Lake and the Tabernacle in the summer of 1930, but in September 1930 he began a term as the organist of the University of California at Los Angeles (UCLA). Through 1939 Schreiner retained this position at UCLA and would return to the Tabernacle for summers. During this time, he also was a member of the LDS Church's Music Committee. Schreiner was also director of music for the Jewish Wilshire Boulevard Temple during this time. By 1930 Schreiner's reputation as an organist was great enough he was recruited on occasion to inaugurate new organs.

Despite his major commitments to music Schreiner also served in the LDS Church in other ways. He was a member of the high council of the church's Hollywood Stake. Some of his children followed him into music, one beginning to serve as a Sunday School organist at age seven.

In September 1936, Schreiner was made the stake music director of the Hollywood Stake.

== Return to Salt Lake City ==
In the summer of 1937, Schreiner took up the position of organist at the LDS chapel in Washington, D.C., which had been vacant since the death the previous March of his one time fellow Salt Lake Tabernacle Organist, Edward P. Kimball. In the 1930s Schreiner also served as a member of the LDS Sunday School General Board.

In the summer of 1938 Schreiner met with LDS Church president Heber J. Grant and they decided he should return to Salt Lake City on a permanent basis as soon as possible. Schreiner had already signed another one-year contract with UCLA, but that would be his last year with that institution.

From that time until 1977, Schreiner was closely involved with the Tabernacle Choir both at home and abroad. In the late 1940s, Schreiner was involved in a major rebuild of the Tabernacle Organ.

=== Concert tours ===
Beginning in 1943 Schreiner performed several concert tours. Initially his touring was managed by Bernard LaBerge. He eventually performed in at least 44 states in the United States.

== Works ==
Besides his many hymns, Schreiner wrote a book entitled Organ Voluntaries.

Schreiner wrote the music to the following hymns in the 1985 English edition of the Latter-day Saint hymnal:

- Truth Eternal (#4)
- Lead Me Into Life Eternal (#45)
- Thy Spirit, Lord, Has Stirred Our Souls (#157)
- While of These Emblems We Partake (Aeolian) (#174)
- God Loved Us, So He Sent His Son (#187)
- In Memory of the Crucified (#190)
- Lord, Accept into thy Kingdom (#236)
- Behold Thy Sons and Daughters Lord (#238)
- Holy Temples on Mount Zion (#289)

Some of his writings refer specifically to his association with the Tabernacle organ such as the following:

- Schreiner, Alexander. Alexander Schreiner Reminisces (Salt Lake City, 1984).
- Schreiner, Alexander. "100 Years of Organs in the Mormon Tabernacle." The Diapason (November 1967)
- Schreiner, Alexander. "The Tabernacle Organ in Salt Lake City." Organ Institute Quarterly, Vol. 7, No. 1 (1957)

=== Music collections ===
- Bach at the Mormon Tabernacle
- The Great Organ at the Mormon Tabernacle
- Christmas with the Mormon Tabernacle Organ and Chimes (Sony Special Products)
