= Richard Elliott (organist) =

American LDS organist

- Born: 1957 (age 68–69); Baltimore, Maryland, U.S.
- Education: Curtis Institute of Music (BMus); University of Rochester (MM, DMA)
- Occupation: Organist

Richard Louis Elliott is an organist primarily known as the longtime principal organist of the Tabernacle Choir at Temple Square.

== Early life ==
Richard Elliott was born and raised in Baltimore, Maryland. His father was an electrical engineer who worked in the Baltimore shipyards, while his mother came from a family of tavern owners. Both had musical inclinations, with his father primarily playing guitar and harmonica while his mother played piano. Elliott grew up playing the piano and singing in choirs, then got his first opportunity to play the organ at age 15 in his local church. He related that he played the promenade from Mussorgsky's Pictures at an Exhibition and was invited by the pastor to play for the service, eventually taking over as the regular organist.

Meanwhile, Elliott participated in several rock bands that played local bars and nightclubs, primarily performing covers of artists like The Rolling Stones. Elliott later recalled that his plan originally was to become a studio musician, and he hoped paid organ gigs could help support him in breaking in to steadier work playing keyboards. His formal musical training included studies at the Peabody Institute of the Johns Hopkins University. Elliott ultimately received a bachelor's degree from the Curtis Institute of Music while also serving as an assistant organist for the Wanamaker Organ. His experience with rock music was a benefit for the Wanamaker position as he was encouraged to play show tunes and other popular music.

== Religious evolution and organ career ==
Elliott's family came from a mixture of Protestant backgrounds, but they primarily attended the Lutheran church coming from his mother's side. He initially studied at Catholic University of America before transferring to Curtis. At Curtis, he was assigned to tutor a violinist from Provo, Utah, which also served as his introduction to Mormonism. He joined The Church of Jesus Christ of Latter-day Saints the same week that he graduated from Curtis, and after working for a year in a bakery, served a mission for the church in Argentina from 1981 to 1983.

After returning from his mission, Elliott continued his education at the Eastman School of Music at the University of Rochester, studying organ under David Craighead. He initially earned a master of music degree and was admitted to the doctoral program, but had second thoughts and was working at the university while considering other career options. When the school offered a scholarship funded by an anonymous donor, he resumed his studies and finished his doctor of musical arts degree. After completing his doctorate, Elliott was appointed an assistant professor of organ at Brigham Young University in 1988.

Elliott's experience with the Tabernacle organ began shortly after joining the church while visiting a Tabernacle Choir broadcast in 1980, after which organists John Longhurst and Robert Cundick invited him to play. He performed a solo recital several years later while finishing his studies at Eastman, and was invited to become a full-time Tabernacle organist when Cundick retired in 1991. In addition to accompanying the Tabernacle Choir and giving recitals at Temple Square, Elliott has recorded many organ pieces with various labels and occasionally gives organ recitals at various locations across the United States. Several of Elliott's arrangements for organ have been published, many by Jackman Music.

== Personal life ==
Elliott is married to Elizabeth Cox Ballantyne, a pianist. They met while both were students at the Eastman School of Music and married in 1987. They have two sons.
