= Roadometer =

Roadometer may mean:

- Roadometer (odometer), an early device like an odometer for measuring mileage, towed by a wagon, invented in 1847, by William Clayton, a Mormon pioneer.
- A type of Drivotrainer, one of these was called a Roadometer.
