= Appleton Milo Harmon =

Latter-day Saint Pioneer

Appleton M. Harmon
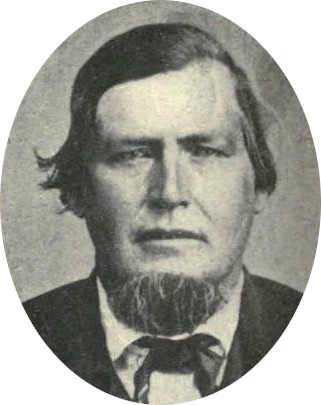
- Born: May 29, 1820; Conneaut Lake, Pennsylvania
- Died: February 27, 1877 (aged 56); Holden, Utah
- Known for: Constructing a "roadometer" as a Mormon pioneer
- Spouse: Elmeda Stringham (m. 1846)

Appleton Milo Harmon (May 29, 1820 – February 27, 1877) was an American farmer, businessman, and builder known as an early member of the Church of Jesus Christ of Latter-day Saints and a leading pioneer of the emigration to Salt Lake City and settlement of Utah Territory.

== Early life ==
Harmon was born in Conneaut Lake, Pennsylvania, the son of Jesse Pierce Harmon and Annie Barnes.

== Career ==
Harmon was devoted to his religion and was a multi-talented builder who constructed sawmills, a cotton factory, pony express roads, furniture, and wagons. He also worked as a farmer, blacksmith, and policeman, among other trades.

Harmon joined the Church of Jesus Christ of Latter-day Saints in 1842 in Nauvoo, Illinois. Because of the persecution of the members of the church, in February 1846, Harmon and his recently married wife loaded their possessions into a wagon and crossed the frozen Mississippi river to Iowa, and then traveled on to Winter Quarters near Florence, Omaha. These were especially hard times and, because of the harsh conditions, his mother, his sister and his first born child died and they are buried at Winter Quarters. In the spring of 1847, Harmon was chosen to be a leader in Brigham Young's vanguard company for the trek to the west. During the 1847 trek, Harmon is often remembered for building an early version of the modern odometer using the conceptual designs of William Clayton and Orson Pratt. It was placed on the wagon of Heber C. Kimball and it improved the efficiency and accuracy of logging the daily mileage. The use of this "Roadometer" was the key to the accuracy of the emigrant's guide later published by Clayton that was essential to subsequent travelers of the Mormon Trail.

Later in the 1847 trek, Harmon was left with nine other men to construct and operate a ferry across the North Platte River near present-day Casper, Wyoming. After settling in Salt Lake City in 1848, Harmon lived in Downtown Salt Lake City, built one of the first sawmills, and farmed near the present location of Sugar House Park. Harmon kept detailed journals of his trek west and his 1850-1853 mission to England that have been published. On the trail heading east for his missionary service in 1850, he saw throngs of gold miners heading west in the second year of the California gold rush, and he was an eye-witness to, and a survivor of, the tragic cholera epidemic that decimated the participants. In 1851 he visited the famous Crystal Palace Exposition in London. He had success on his mission and led a company of about 300 Latter-day Saints from England to Salt Lake City on his return in 1853. In 1862, he was called to settle southern Utah. After experiencing floods of the Virgin River in Grafton, he settled in Toquerville, Utah, where he built a lumbermill, farmed, and made furniture. In 1865, Brigham Young called him to oversee the design, construction and equipping of a factory for producing cotton fabric. Cotton and woolen fabrics were produced until 1904, although interest in cotton diminished after the civil war and the coming of the railroad. The building that housed the factory, located in Washington, Utah, still stands.

== Personal life ==
Harmon married Elmeda Stringham (20 Dec. 1829 - 6 Aug. 1923) in 1846. In 1870, Harmon moved to Holden, Utah, where he built another lumbermill. He and Elmeda had 11 children, nine of which survived to adulthood.

== Death ==
Appleton died in 1877 and is buried in Holden Cemetery, Millard, Utah. Elmeda lived to be 93 years old and is buried in American Fork Cemetery, American Fork, Utah.

== Bibliography ==
- Anderson, Maybelle Harmon. The Journals of Appleton Milo Harmon (Arthur H. Clark Company, Glendale, 1946), ASIN: B000EIPPVW
