= Mormon pioneers =

Migrant group

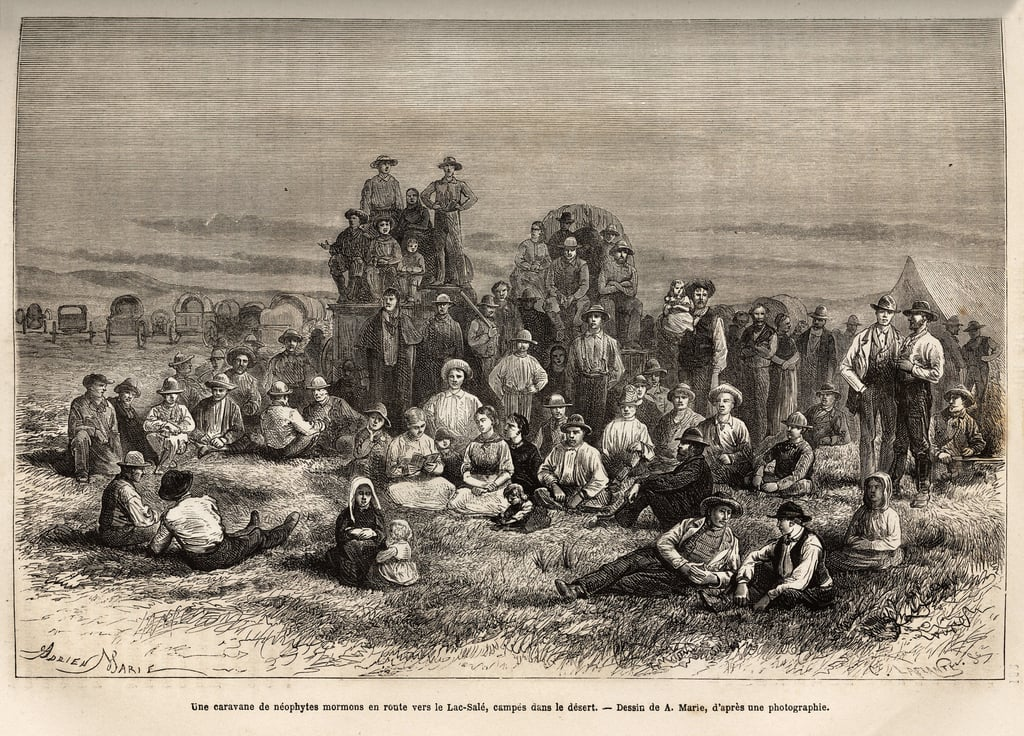
An engraving published in Le Tour du Monde in 1874, based on an 1868 drawing of Mormon pioneers by Adrien-Emmanuel Marie.

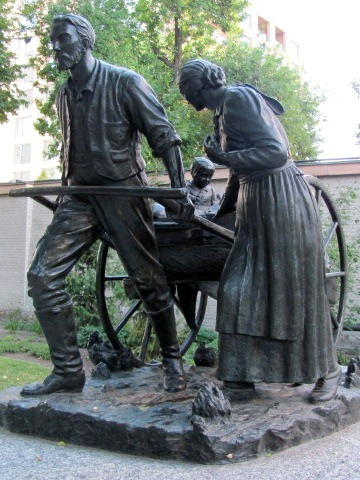
The Handcart Pioneer Monument, by Torleif S. Knaphus, located on Temple Square in Salt Lake City, Utah

The Mormon pioneers were members of the Church of Jesus Christ of Latter-day Saints (LDS Church), also known as Latter-day Saints, who migrated over time from the mid-1840s until the late 1860s across the United States from the Midwest to the Salt Lake Valley in what is today the U.S. state of Utah. At the time of the planning of the exodus in 1846, the territory comprising present-day Utah was part of the Republic of Mexico, with which the U.S. soon went to war over a border dispute left unresolved after the annexation of Texas. The Salt Lake Valley became American territory as a result of the Treaty of Guadalupe Hidalgo, which ended the war.

The journey was taken by about 70,000 people, beginning with advance parties sent out by church leaders in March 1846 after the 1844 death of the church's leader Joseph Smith made it clear that the group could not remain in Nauvoo, Illinois—which the church had recently purchased, improved, renamed, and developed, because of the Missouri Mormon War, setting off the Illinois Mormon War. The well-organized wagon train migration began in earnest in April 1847, and the period (including the flight from Missouri in 1838 to Nauvoo), known as the Mormon Exodus is, by convention among social scientists, traditionally assumed to have ended with the completion of the first transcontinental railroad in 1869. Not everyone could afford to transport a family by railroad, and the transcontinental railroad network only serviced limited main routes, so wagon train migrations to the Far West continued sporadically until the 20th century.

== Background of the migration ==
Map showing the westward exodus of the LDS Church between 1846 and 1869. Also shown is a portion of the route followed by the Mormon Battalion, which fought in the Mexican-American War, and the path followed by the handcart companies to the Mormon Trail.

Since its founding in 1830, members of the LDS Church frequently had conflicts and difficult relations with non-members, due to both their unorthodox religious beliefs and the conduct of the church leaders and members. These and other reasons caused the body of the church to move from one place to another—to Ohio, Missouri, and then to Illinois, where they built the city of Nauvoo. Sidney Rigdon was the First Counselor in the church's First Presidency, and as its spokesman, Rigdon preached several controversial sermons in Missouri, including the Salt Sermon and the July 4th Oration. These speeches have sometimes been seen as contributing to the conflict known as the 1838 Mormon War in Missouri. As a result of the conflict, the Mormons were expelled from the state by Governor Boggs, and Rigdon and Smith were arrested and imprisoned in Liberty Jail. Rigdon was released on a writ of habeas corpus and made his way to Illinois, where he joined the main body of Mormon refugees in 1839. In 1844, Smith and his brother Hyrum were killed by a mob while in custody in the city of Carthage, Illinois. In 1846, religious tensions reached their peak, and in 1848 mobs burned the Latter-day Saint temple in Nauvoo.

According to church belief, God inspired Brigham Young (Joseph Smith's successor as church president) to call for the Saints (as church members call themselves) to organize and head West, beyond the western frontier of the United States.

During the winter of 1846–1847, Latter-day Saint leaders in Winter Quarters and Iowa laid plans for the migration of the large number of Saints, their equipment, and their livestock. It was here that Young first met Thomas L. Kane, a non-Mormon from Philadelphia with deep personal connections to the administration of U.S. president James K. Polk administration. Kane obtained permission for the Mormons to winter on Indian territory, and the site was originally called Kanesville. Young continued to trust Kane throughout his own lifetime, particularly as an intermediary with the often hostile federal government of the United States. This major undertaking was a significant test of leadership capability and the existing administrative network of the recently restructured church. For his role in the migration, Brigham Young is sometimes referred to as the "American Moses."

Young personally reviewed all available information on the Salt Lake Valley and the Great Basin, consulted with mountain men and trappers who traveled through Winter Quarters, and met with Father Pierre-Jean De Smet, a Jesuit missionary familiar with the Great Basin. The wary Young insisted the Mormons should settle in a location no other colonizers wanted, and felt the Salt Lake Valley met that requirement, but would provide the Saints with many advantages as well.

The valley was then under the administration of Mexico, which had banned immigration from the United States with the Law of April 6, 1830. The Mormon settlers entered Mexico without government authorization, and despite the sovereignty rights held by the Shoshone, Utes, and the Goshutes. The U.S. Army captured Santa Fe de Nuevo México and the colonized parts of Alta California in late 1846, but the Treaty of Guadalupe Hidalgo would not cede northern Mexico to the United States until February, 1848.

== Vanguard company of 1847 ==
Young organized a vanguard company to break the trail west to the Rocky Mountains, gather information about trail conditions, including water sources and Native American tribes, and to ultimately select the central gathering point in the Great Basin. The initial company would select and break the primary trail with the expectation that later pioneers would maintain and improve it. It was hoped that the group could, wherever possible, establish fords and ferries and plant crops for later harvest. In late February, plans were made to gather portable boats, maps, scientific instruments, farm implements and seeds. Techniques for irrigating crops were investigated. A new route on the north side of the Platte River was chosen to avoid major interaction with travelers using the established Oregon Trail on the river's south side. Given the needs of the large volume of Saints who would travel west, church leaders decided to avoid potential conflicts over grazing rights, water access and campsites.

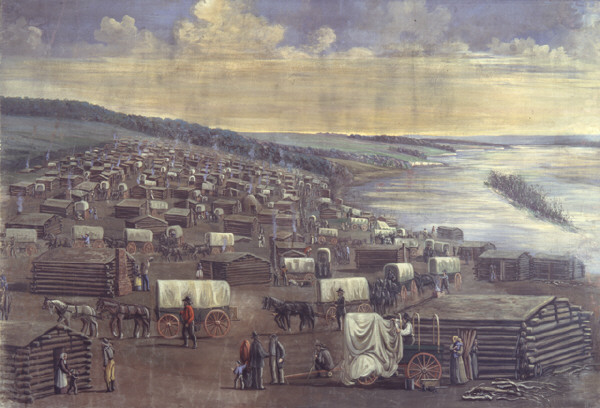
Winter Quarters, by C. C. A. Christensen

In April 1847, Young consulted with members of the Quorum of the Twelve Apostles who had recently returned from the British mission. John Taylor, Parley P. Pratt and Orson Hyde brought money contributed by the English Saints, a map based on John C. Fremont's recent western expedition, and instruments for calculating latitude, elevation, temperature and barometric pressure. Chosen members of the vanguard group were gathered together, final supplies were packed, and the group was organized into military companies. The group consisted of 143 men, including three enslaved African-American men, and eight members of the Quorum of the Twelve Apostles, three women, and two children. The train contained 73 wagons, one cannon, 93 horses, 52 mules, 66 oxen, 19 cows, 17 dogs and some chickens, and carried enough supplies to fully provision the group for one year. Young divided this group into 14 companies, each with a designated captain. Apprehensive of possible danger posed by Native Americans, a militia and night guard was formed under the direction of Stephen Markham.

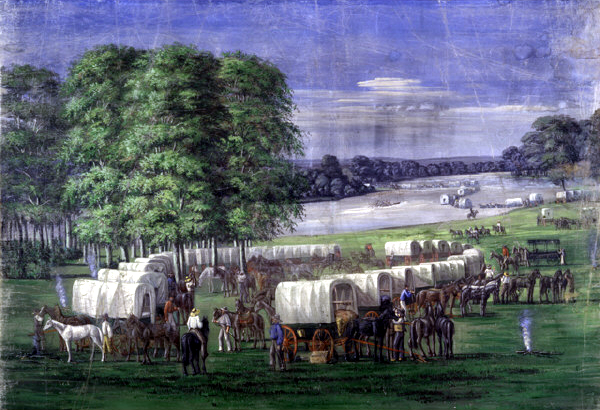
Pioneers Crossing the Plains of Nebraska, also by Christensen

On April 5, 1847, at 2 p.m., the wagon train moved west from Winter Quarters toward the Great Basin. With the afternoon start, they made three miles (5 km) and camped in a line a few hundred yards from a stand of timber. Journal records show that Young actively managed the journey, supervising details and occasionally giving reprimands when evening and Sunday recreation became rowdy or group members failed to complete their tasks. On one occasion, he chastised the camp's hunters "for being wasteful of flesh ... killing more than was really needed." The camp was awakened by a bugle at 5 a.m. and the company was expected to be prepared for travel by 7 a.m. Each day's travel ended at 8:30 p.m. and the camp was in bed by 9 p.m. The company traveled six days during the week, but generally stayed in camp on Sunday to observe the Sabbath.

Some camp members were assigned specific tasks. William Clayton was appointed company scribe and was expected to record an accurate description of their journey and the distance they traveled each day. Clayton collaborated with Orson Pratt, a mathematician, and Appleton Harmon, a carpenter, to create a wagon-wheel odometer, or roadometer. It showed that the company averaged between fourteen and twenty miles per day. Apostle Orson Pratt was named the company's scientific observer. He made regular readings on scientific instruments, took notes on geological formations and mineral resources, and described plants and animals. Journals kept by both Clayton and Pratt have become valuable resources for historians of the Mormon trek west. Clayton made his notes and measurements available to other emigrants in his The Latter-Day Saints' Emigrants' Guide.

Women of the company also performed vital tasks along the way. While much time was spent on traditional activities such as cooking, sewing, and tending children, several women served as scribes and diary keepers. Harriet Page Young, wife of Lorenzo Young, was the first woman selected for the company. She was in ill health and Lorenzo Young feared to leave her and their young children behind. The other original women of the company, Ellen Sanders Kimball, wife of Heber C. Kimball, and Clarissa Decker Young, wife of Brigham Young, were asked to accompany the group to look after Harriet Young and keep her company. The three women were joined by a larger group of women church members from Mississippi who merged with the main party at Laramie, Wyoming.

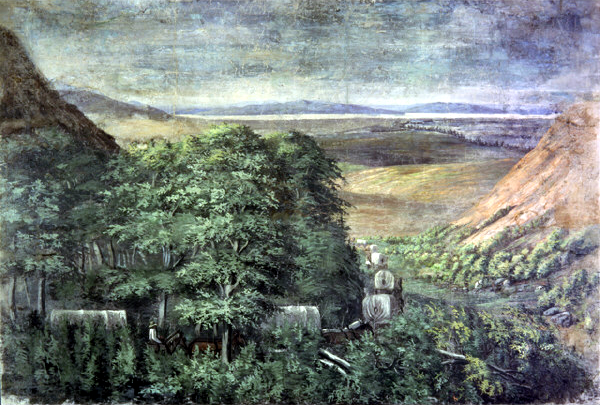
Entering the Great Salt Lake Valley, also by Christensen

The first segment of the journey, from Winter Quarters to Fort Laramie, took six weeks, with the company arriving at the fort on June 1. The company halted for repairs and to reshoe the draft animals. While at Fort Laramie, the vanguard company was joined by members of the Mormon Battalion who had been excused from service due to illness and sent to winter in Pueblo, Colorado. Also traveling in the new group were church members from Mississippi who had taken a more southern route toward the Great Basin. At this point, the now larger company took the established Oregon Trail toward the trading post at Ft. Bridger. At a difficult crossing of the Platte, just before encountering the Sweetwater River, the company made use of their portable boat and were able to cross with comparative ease. Seizing the opportunity to both help future travelers and increase the cash available to the migration, nine men under the direction of Thomas Grover were left behind to construct and operate a ferry at that location. Missourians and other travelers at the river paid the Saints $1.50 or more per wagon to help them cross.

During the last week of June, Sam Brannan, leader of the voyage of the Brooklyn Saints, met the company near Green River, Wyoming. He reported to Young about his group's successful journey and their settlement in what is today San Francisco, California. He urged the vanguard company to continue on to California but was unable to shift the leader's focus away from the Great Basin. Young also met mountain man Jim Bridger on June 28. They discussed possible routes into the Salt Lake Valley, and the feasibility of viable settlements in the mountain valleys of the Great Basin. Bridger was enthusiastic about settlement near Utah Lake, reporting fish, wild fruit, timber and good grazing. He told Young that local Indians raised good crops, including corn and pumpkins, but that there was ever-present danger of frost. The company pushed on through South Pass, rafted across the Green River and arrived at Fort Bridger on July 7. About the same time, they were joined by thirteen more members of the sick detachment of the Mormon Battalion.

The vanguard company now faced a more rugged and hazardous journey, and were concerned about negotiating the passes of the Rocky Mountains. They had received conflicting advice, but Young chose to follow the trail used by the Donner–Reed party on their journey to California the previous year. Shortly after leaving Fort Bridger, the group met trapper Miles Goodyear, who owned a trading post at the mouth of the Weber River. He was enthusiastic about the agricultural potential of the large Weber Valley. During the trip through the rugged mountains, the vanguard company divided into three sections. After crossing the Green River, several members of the party suffered from "mountain fever" (probably Colorado tick fever, which is carried by the Rocky Mountain wood tick). Young himself became ill soon after meeting Goodyear. The small sick detachment lagged behind the larger group, and a scouting division was created to move ahead on the designated route.

In July 1847, the first company reached the Salt Lake Valley, with scouts Erastus Snow and Orson Pratt entering the valley on July 21. Pratt wrote: ...we could not refrain from a shout of joy, which almost involuntarily escaped from our lips the moment this grand and lovely scenery was within our view. The two scouts undertook a twelve-mile (19 km) exploratory circuit into the valley before returning to the larger party. The next day, larger segments of the valley were explored, streams and hot springs investigated and the first camp established in the Salt Lake Valley. On July 23, Pratt offered a prayer dedicating the land to the Lord. Ground was broken, irrigation ditches were dug, and the first fields of potatoes and turnips were planted.

On July 24, Young first saw the valley from a "sick" wagon driven by his friend, Wilford Woodruff. According to Woodruff, Young expressed his satisfaction in the appearance of the valley and declared "This is the right place, drive on." Today a monument stands in the spot where he made this declaration. Young later reported that he had seen the valley, including Ensign Peak, in a vision and recognized the spot.

On July 28, Young established a location for the future Salt Lake Temple and presented a city plan to the larger group for their approval. In August 1847, Young and other selected members of the vanguard company returned to Winter Quarters. By December 1847, more than two thousand Mormons had completed the journey to the Salt Lake Valley. Several hundred, including Young, returned east to gather and organize the companies scheduled for following years. Demographic estimates place 1,611 pioneers in the valley of the Great Salt Lake during the winter of 1847. The adult labor force, however, was quite small as a high percentage of the group, 53.2 percent were under the age of nineteen. Twenty five percent of the total were children under the age of eight.

Each year during the Mormon migration, people continued to be organized into "companies", each company bearing the name of its leader. The company was further divided into groups of 10 and 50 with authority and responsibility delegated downward.

== Travel conditions ==
The pioneers traveled to the Salt Lake Valley in the Great Basin using mainly large farm wagons, handcarts, and, in some cases, personally carrying their belongings. (Note: According to the American Studies researchers involved with the Oregon Trail II game, such wagons had a cargo capacity of about 3,000 pounds and weighed another thousand themselves.) Their trail along the north bank of the Platte River and North Platte River and over the continental divide climbing up to South Pass and Pacific Springs from Fort John along the valley of the Sweetwater River, then down to Fort Bridger and from there down to the Great Salt Lake became known as the Mormon Trail.

Financial resources of the church members varied, with many families suffering from the loss of land and personal possessions in Missouri, and Illinois. This impacted the resources and supplies each family could draw upon as they covered the more than 1,000 miles (2,000 km) to the Great Basin. Church funds were also limited at this time, but church leaders provided what funding and other material assistance they could to families and companies which were undersupplied.

Covered wagons pulled by oxen were common, particularly in the early American companies. In October 1845, as church members were preparing to leave Nauvoo, the Nauvoo Neighbor printed an extensive list of suggested provisions for each family wagon. The provisions included two to three yoke of oxen, two milk cows, other livestock, arms and ammunition, 15 lb of iron, pulleys and ropes, fishing gear, farming and mechanical equipment, cooking equipment and at least 1000 pounds of flour plus assorted other foodstuffs. Some pioneers overestimated the number of goods they could haul on the long journey. As the oxen weakened under the strain, wagons were lightened by discarding prized possessions, including book collections, family china, and furniture. In 1847, just east of the Rocky Mountains, the Kimball family dug a large hole, wrapped their piano in buffalo skins and carefully buried it. An ox team retrieved the instrument the following spring and transported it to the Salt Lake Valley.

Several later companies were largely made up of people with fewer resources, who pulled or pushed handcarts (similar to wheelbarrows) holding all of their provisions and personal belongings. Many of these pioneers walked much of the way as family members rode in the carts.

Due to the weather in the American heartland, the best time to travel was April–September. Some companies, however, started late in the season which resulted in hardship and sometimes disaster. The most famous of these are the Willie and the Martin handcart companies. Leaving Iowa in July 1856, they did not reach Utah until November, suffering many deaths due to winter weather and the lack of adequate supplies.

== The ship Brooklyn ==
In November 1845, Samuel Brannan, newspaperman and small-scale publisher of the Mormon paper The Prophet (later the New York Messenger), was directed by church elders to charter a ship that would carry its passengers away from the eastern United States to California, which was then Alta California, part of Mexico. Over the course of two months, Brannan managed to recruit 70 men, 68 women, and 100 children—238 persons total. Brannan negotiated a fare of $75 for adults and half-fare for children with Abel W. Richardson, master and a principal owner of the ship Brooklyn.

On February 4, 1846 (the same day the Mormon exodus from Nauvoo began), the ship Brooklyn cleared New York harbor and began its nearly six-month voyage to the Pacific coast of Alta California. The ship, built in 1834 by Joseph H. Russell at Newcastle, Maine, weighed 445 short tons (404 t) and measured 125 ft x 28 ft × 14 ft (8.5 m × 4.3 m) x 4.3 m).

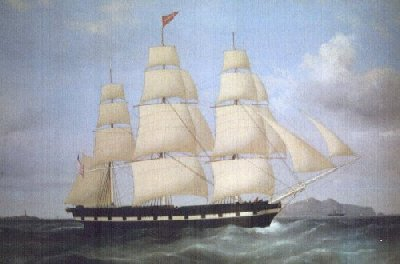
The Ship Brooklyn off Skerries Rock, by Duncan McFarlane, showing Brooklyn near the north coast of Anglesey, North Wales

The voyage is the longest passage made by a Mormon emigrant company. Brooklyn traveled south across the Atlantic equator, around Cape Horn, stopping at the Juan Fernández Islands, then to the Sandwich Islands (Hawaii), finally docking in Yerba Buena (now San Francisco) on July 29, 1846, having made the sea voyage in five months and twenty-seven days.

Passenger Augusta Joyce Crocheron described the voyage:

As for the pleasure of the trip, we met disappointment, for we once lay becalmed in the tropics, and at another time we were "hatched below" during a terrific storm. Women and children were at night lashed to their berths, for in no other way could they keep in. Furniture rolled back and forth endangering limb and life. The waves swept the deck and even reached the staterooms ... Children's voices were crying in the darkness, mother's voices soothing or scolding, men's voices rising above the others, all mingled with the distressing groans and cries of the sick for help, and, above all, the roaring of the wind and howling of the tempest made a scene and feeling indescribable.

The passengers left the United States with the hope of finding religious freedom. However, they arrived in Alta California just weeks after its occupation by the United States Navy at the outset of the Mexican–American War. Despite the tensions that drove them from their homes in the Eastern States, the crew and passengers "felt more cheerful and secure." Mormon historian B. H. Roberts noted in his work A Comprehensive History of The Church of Jesus Christ of Latter-day Saints:

On the announcement of the United States naval officer, who boarded the Brooklyn as she came to anchor, that the emigrants "were in the United States of America," three hearty cheers were given in reply ... Three weeks previous to the arrival of the Saints, the United States flag had been raised and the country taken possession of in the name of the government which the flag represented.

This dangerous trek of nearly 24,000 miles (39,000 km) would claim the lives of ten of the ship's 238 passengers, nine of whom were buried at sea.

Brooklyn Place, in Chinatown, San Francisco, is named for the ship, as was the erstwhile Brooklyn, California.

== Later migration ==
After the initial departure of the Latter-day Saints living in Illinois and Missouri, converts to the church from other areas in the United States and from Europe followed the initial trail to join the main body of the church in Salt Lake City. Every year from 1847 until 1869, church members making this journey were formed into organized companies. Migration continued until about 1890, but those who came by railroad are not generally considered to be "Mormon pioneers."

=== Danish Mormon pioneers ===
Mormon pioneers emigrated from many countries. Denmark was one of those countries, with a large number of Mormon emigrants coming to Utah between 1850 and 1910. The migration of Danes was initiated when missionaries from the LDS Church, including Erastus Snow, Peter O. Hansen and two others, were sent to Denmark in 1850. Hansen made the first translation of the Book of Mormon from English, by translating it into Danish. Religious freedom was written into the constitution of the Kingdom of Denmark in 1849. Along with the Danish translation of the Book of Mormon, this opened the area to great success in attaining converts. At that time the LDS Church was urging new members to gather to Utah, which led these early converts to make emigration plans.

Box Elder, Cache, Salt Lake, Utah, and Sevier counties had large numbers of Danes listed in 19th Century Utah census totals but Sanpete County was the area where the largest number settled.

== Growth and development ==
The Mormons settled in the Salt Lake Valley, which at that time was used as a buffer zone between the Shoshones and the Utes, who were at war. Upon arriving in the Salt Lake Valley, the Mormons developed and cultivated the arid terrain to make it more suitable. They created irrigation systems, laid out farms, built houses, churches and schools. Access to water was crucial. Almost immediately, Young sent out scouting parties to identify and settle additional community sites. While it was difficult to find large areas in the Great Basin where water sources were dependable and growing seasons long enough to raise vitally important subsistence crops, satellite communities began to be formed in all directions. Church members eventually headed south into present-day Arizona and Mexico, west into California, north into Idaho and Canada, and east into Wyoming, settling many communities in those areas.

Shortly after the first company arrived in the Salt Lake Valley in 1847, the community of Bountiful was established to the north. In 1848, pioneers moved into lands purchased from trapper Miles Goodyear in present-day Ogden. In 1849, Tooele and Fort Utah (also known as Fort Provo, in modern-day Provo) were founded. The settlement of Provo was particularly troubling to the Utes, since it was at the heart of their territory. Ute chief Wakara suggested the pioneers instead move into the Sanpete Valley in central Utah, where they established the community of Manti. Tensions in Fort Utah mounted after Mormons murdered Old Bishop, and Young ordered an attack on Utes, called the Battle at Fort Utah. This was shortly followed by the Walker War.

Fillmore, Utah, intended to be the capital of the new territory, was established in 1851. In 1855, efforts to subdue and evangelize to local Native people led to outposts in Fort Lemhi on Idaho's Salmon River, Las Vegas, Nevada and Elk Mountain in east-central of present-day Utah.

The experiences of returning members of the Mormon Battalion were also important in establishing new communities. On their journey west, the Mormon soldiers had identified dependable rivers and fertile river valleys in Colorado, Arizona and southern California. In addition, as the discharged men traveled to rejoin their families in the Salt Lake Valley, they moved through southern Nevada and southern Utah. Jefferson Hunt, senior Mormon officer of the Battalion, actively searched for settlement sites, minerals and other resources. His report encouraged 1851 settlement efforts in Iron Country, near present-day Cedar City. These southern explorations eventually led to Mormon settlements in St. George, Utah, Las Vegas and San Bernardino, California, as well as communities in southern Arizona. By 1885, Mormon communities were being established in northern Mexico.

== Legacy ==
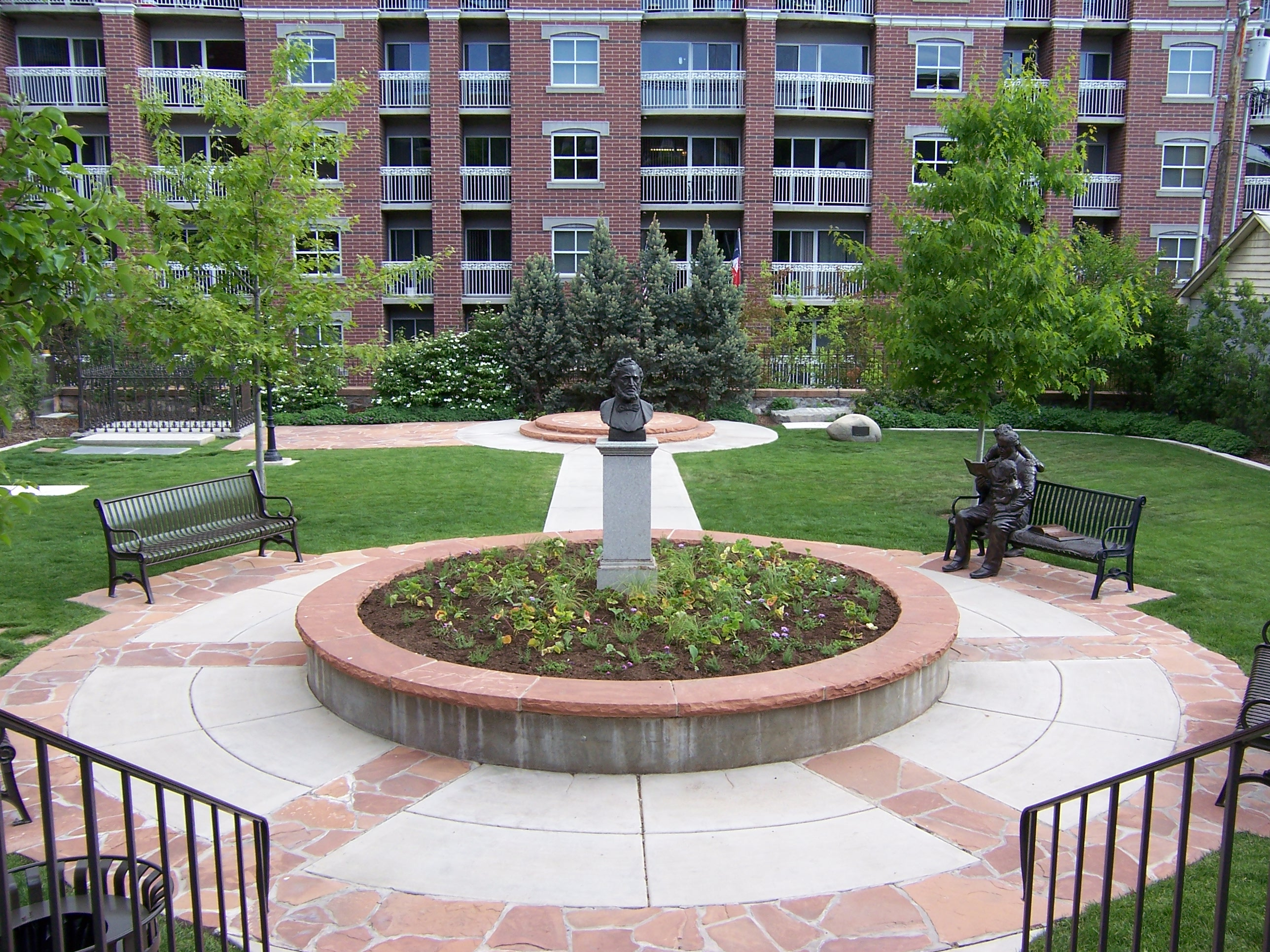
The Mormon Pioneer Memorial Monument in Salt Lake City

The Mormon pioneers are celebrated annually on July 24 in the State of Utah, known as Pioneer Day. Salt Lake City also has the Mormon Pioneer Memorial Monument, where Young, Eliza R. Snow, and other Mormon pioneers are buried and where a memorial exists dedicated to all who crossed the plains to the Salt Lake Valley. Additionally, the "Pioneer" (characterized as "Pioneer Pete") is Lehi High School's mascot. In some places, Mormons hold an event called "Pioneer Trek" for people who are ages fourteen to eighteen. In participating in the trek, the youth dress as pioneers and pack a few things to carry in handcarts. They go on a hike for a couple of days so they can experience what the pioneers had. During this multi-day event, camp organizers sometimes require youth to avoid the use of technology or anything that the pioneers did not have on their journeys, to enhance the experience.

== Mormon Pioneer Overland Travel Database ==
The Mormon Pioneer Overland Travel gathers information from journals, church history records, and other materials to locate the company in which an ancestor traveled across the plains to get to Utah. This covers known and unknown wagon trains from 1847 to 1868. It contains lists of passengers in companies as well as genealogical information about ancestors. It is the most comprehensive list of Mormon immigrants and the wagon trains that brought them to Utah.

== See also ==
- American pioneer – American settlers who migrated westward
- "Come, Come, Ye Saints" – Hymn about pioneer migration
- Daughters of the Utah Handcart Pioneers
- Daughters of Utah Pioneers – Lineage society
- Hawn's Mill massacre – Massacre of Mormons at Caldwell County, Missouri, US
- History of The Church of Jesus Christ of Latter-day Saints
- History of the Latter Day Saint movement
- History of Utah
- List of Mormon family organizations
- Mormon Pioneer National Heritage Area – United States National Heritage Area in Utah
- Mountain Meadows massacre – 1857 massacre of California-bound immigrants by Nauvoo Legion militiamen
- Sons of Utah Pioneers – Historical organization focusing on Utah, United States
- The Voortrekkers – 1836–1852 Boer migrations away from the British Cape Colony
- This Is the Place Heritage Park – State park in Salt Lake City, Utah, U.S.
