= The Latter-Day Saints' Emigrants' Guide =

1897 book by William Clayton

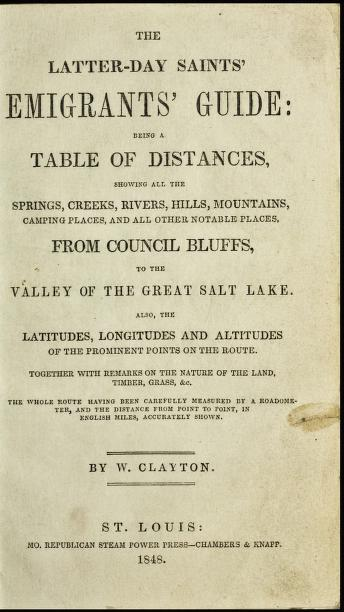
- Title page of the original edition
- Author: William Clayton
- Publication date: 1897
- ISBN: 978-0877700401

Clayton's Guide, Clayton's Emigrant Guide, or as when published, The Latter-Day Saints' Emigrants' Guide, published by Missouri Republican Steam Power Press, Chambers & Knapp, 1848 and written by William Clayton, was one of a number of very popular guidebooks written to support the westward expansion of the United States in the mid-nineteenth century when organized emigrant wagon trains began to form in large numbers at various river ports on the Missouri River.

== Description ==
Clayton's guide covered landmarks and distances starting from Council Bluffs and going to the Great Salt Lake along the Mormon Trail. The guide recorded the distance between landmarks like Chimney Rock and Devil's Gate and gave suggestions for camp locations and where to find water and forage. He collaborated with Orson Pratt and Appleton Harmon to create a wagon-wheel odometer, or roadometer, to record distances more accurately. They were the first pioneers to scientifically measure the distances on the overland trail.

== Writing and sales ==
Hoping to use the profits from the guide to finance his family's migration, Clayton got Brigham Young's approval of the project. On Brigham Young's behalf, Willard Richards wrote to Nathaniel H. Felt in St. Louis and William Pickett, asking them to help publish the guide. Clayton had 5,000 copies published. The guides were sold for five dollars each, but were in high demand. Joseph E. Ware's The Emigrants' Guide to California copied information from Clayton's guide for the section between Fort Laramie and the Bear River. Many pioneers used Clayton's guide; first editions are rare, presumably because they were well-used. In 1852, Fisher and Bennett started to sell unauthorized copies of the guide for fifty cents each. Clayton offered to sell them the copyright, but the press refused on the grounds that "the considered themselves perfectly safe without it." He considered selling guides to emigrants in England to circumvent Fisher and Bennett's plan, but he wasn't in England long enough to enact it.
