= Road Safety Authority =

Irish state agency

Road Safety Authority (RSA)
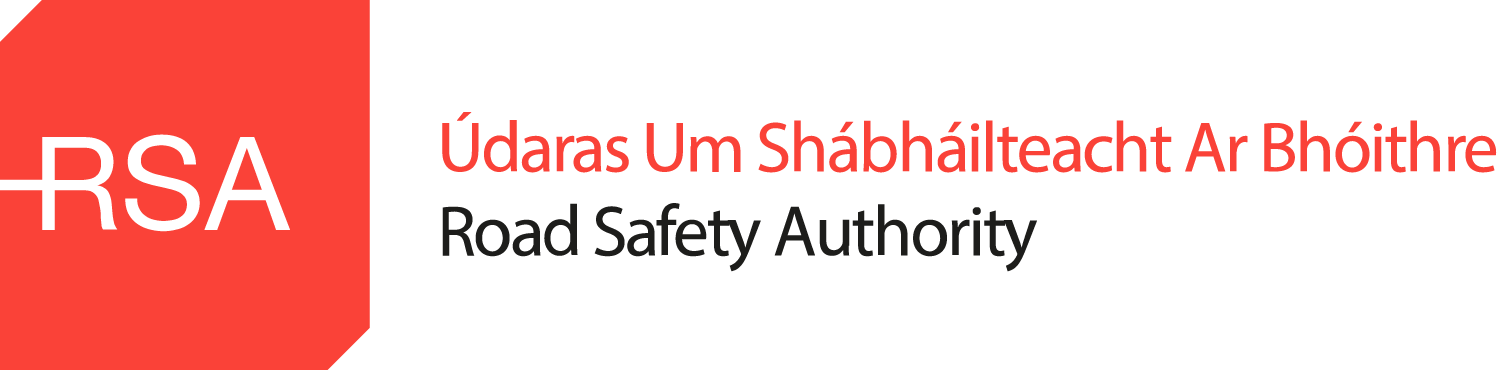

State agency overview
- Formed: 1 September 2006
- Jurisdiction: Ireland
- Headquarters: Moy Valley Business Park, Primrose Hill, Ballina, County Mayo
- Employees: 309
- Ministers responsible: Darragh O'Brien, Minister for Transport; Seán Canney, Minister of State at the Department of Transport
- State agency executives: Sam Waide, CEO; Anne Graham, Chairperson
- Key document: Road Safety Authority Act 2006
- Website: RSA website

The Road Safety Authority (RSA; Irish: Údarás Um Shábháilteacht Ar Bhóithre) is a state agency of the Irish Government to promote road safety within Ireland. The agency has functions devolved from the Department of Transport.

== History and Governance ==
The Road Safety Authority was established in September 2006, charged with the task of improving safety on Ireland's roads, under the Road Safety Authority Act 2006, in response to the high number of deaths on Irish roads. It assumed the road safety function from the National Safety Council, established in 1987, which in turn had incorporated the functions of the National Road Safety Association, established in 1974.

The organisation's headquarters are located at Primrose Hill, Ballina, County Mayo. The first chairperson of the RSA was veteran TV and radio celebrity, former host of the Late Late Show Gay Byrne. Byrne had been the chairperson since its foundation and secured a second 5-year term in 2011. However, on 16 June 2014, he announced his intention to step down as chairman on 5 August 2014. Former TD Liz O'Donnell fulfilled the role from 2015 to 2024. She was succeeded in February 2025 by Anne Graham, former CEO of the National Transport Authority.

Noel Brett was the founding Chief Executive of the Authority. In 2013, he stepped down from his position to take up a position as chief lobbyist for the Irish Banking Federation. Brett was succeeded by Moyagh Murdock who took over as CEO in 2014. In 2020, Murdock stepped down to take up a role as head of insurance industry lobby group, Insurance Ireland. Sam Waide was confirmed as her successor in June 2020.

== Functions ==
Amongst the functions of the RSA are the promotion of road safety, research on accidents and road safety, driver testing and licensing, as well as establishing vehicle-related and other safe driving standards.

The RSA and the Garda Síochána enforce the licensing provisions of the Road Transport Acts: "As well as a fine, if you are an unlicensed haulier you can expect the RSA to look closely at your compliance with other laws, such as those covering: Drivers’ hours rules, Road traffic requirements, Roadworthiness of your vehicles and trailers."

The RSA is also responsible for monitoring progress of The National Road Safety Strategy. In 2021, the RSA and the Department of Transport launched a ten-year Road Safety Strategy with the aim of reducing road deaths and serious injuries by 50% by 2030 as part of a path towards Vision Zero.

Under the banner of NDLS (National Driver Licence Service) the RSA is responsible for the issuing of driving licences in Ireland.

== Initiatives ==
In 2009 the authority announced it was considering a number of practical options to further its aim to cut death rates among the country's young male drivers, including the possibility of a late-night driving curfew for all male drivers under the age of 25.

Other initiatives include the recommendation of a number of changes to Ireland's National Car Test, which is supervised by the RSA, requiring vehicles older than ten years to be tested every year as opposed to biennially, while stricter controls will be introduced on non-functioning fault warning lights, overly noisy exhausts, and tinted windows and windscreens.

In 2008 the Road Safety Authority received information from vehicle checking agency Cartell about the issue of written off cars from the UK being imported, repaired and registered for use in Ireland. The subsequent Irish Times article provoked an investigation by the Garda Siochána, Vehicle Registration Unit, Road Safety Authority and Revenue Commissioners. This resulted in a change to legislation so that from September 2010 all imported vehicles must be taken to a National Car Test Centre for inspection before being registered in Ireland.

In October 2009, it was announced that the RSA had struck an agreement under which the disqualification of drivers in Ireland and in the UK will be mutually recognised. The accord, which was the first such deal between two EU member states, this came into effect in February 2010.

In June 2011 Ireland's improvement in reducing road safety fatalities enabled it to be ranked in sixth place for road safety in the EU. The RSA stated: "The number of Irish road deaths fell to 212 in 2010, the lowest level on record, down 26 from 2009. The Government’s road safety target of achieving no more than 252 deaths per annum by the end of 2012 was achieved three years ahead of schedule."

On 5 October 2011, the RSA announced a joint venture with the Irish Tyre Industry Association with the intention of promoting a "tyre safety" week. Two days later the RSA issued a fresh announcement distancing itself from the practical demonstration of vehicle stopping distances it had earlier endorsed after it was alleged that one of the test vehicles used in the tyre safety demonstration had had its ABS braking system disabled.

In 2012, the RSA, having been consulted to offer an opinion on a TV advertisement for Meteor (a mobile telephone service provider), concluded that "they were of the view that the advertisement promoted highly dangerous road user behaviour". The advertisement included a comedic segment showing a cyclist following a bus to receive free wifi. Whilst the cyclist depicted in the Meteor ad was wearing a helmet, he was using a mobile phone whilst riding a bicycle.

== Criticisms and Controversies ==
The RSA's "He drives, she dies" campaign in 2008, which aimed to raise awareness among female drivers of the risks of getting into cars with men they feel may not drive safely, came in for some criticism in the Irish media. The Broadcasting Complaints Commission also received a number of complaints from members of the public relating to the campaign. RSA Chief Executive Noel Brett defended the campaign as justified by accident statistics, saying that "women need to know that they are being killed through male-dominated driver errors such as speeding and drink driving," adding "male drivers are four times more likely to be involved in a fatal collision than a female driver".

The RSA was mentioned in relation to public agencies continuing to operate outside of the remit of the Ombudsman and the Information Commissioner, in a speech delivered by Emily O'Reilly in 2010.

In 2011, some controversy was caused when Gay Byrne was shown travelling in a car with Terry Wogan when Byrne appeared not to be wearing his seatbelt. Byrne has also admitted to drink driving in the past, but said it was "part of the Irish culture at the time".

Also in 2011, RTÉ revealed that individuals in some of the National Car Testing Service centres could issue an NCT car safety certificate on payment of €100 for cars with serious safety defects. The tests are subcontracted to and conducted by Applus.

=== Spending Controversies ===
In September 2024, it was reported that the RSA had breached public spending rules on five contracts worth €3.7 million. The report came in the wake of ongoing criticism of the authority over its response to rising road deaths and ahead of meetings to discuss its future, and was described as "the final nail in the coffin of the RSA as currently constituted". In October of the same year it was reported that the Authority had spent €2.5m on public relations since 2020.

In August 2026 it was reported that the annual expenditure on marketing and advertising had increased from €3.5m in 2020 to €8.5m in 2025, with a total of €44m spent on advertising and public relations between January 2020 and July 2026, including €32.9m to Spark Foundry. The spending was described by Sinn Féin TD, Pa Daly as "alarming when considered in the context of the rapid rise in road deaths over the same period". It was later reported that the Road Safety Authority had spent more than €43,000 on media training services for staff ahead of appearances before Oireachtas committees over a three and a half year period.

=== Response to rising road deaths in 2023-24 ===
In January 2024, the RSA reported that road deaths in 2023 were the highest in nearly a decade, with 184 people killed on the roads, a 19% increase on the previous year, and that pedestrian fatalities were the highest since 2011.

In April 2024, in response to a continued increase in road fatalities, a coalition of around 30 community groups from around the country issued a statement expressing no confidence in the Road Safety Authority, declaring the authority "not fit for purpose". They cited the RSA's failure to provide the necessary data on road traffic collisions to local authorities and road safety auditors, their silence in the face of opposition to safe infrastructure delivery, and their focus on providing high visibility clothing to school children, "those with the least responsibility and the least capacity to make any difference to road safety" In an interview with RTÉ, Minister of State at the Department of Transport, Jack Chambers, confirmed that recommendations on the reform of the Road Safety Authority would be published in the summer.

Also in April 2024, an investigation by RTÉ's Prime Time found that over 24,000 drivers who had been disqualified by the courts between 2016 and 2022 had failed to relinquish their licences. The road safety advocacy group, PARC was critical of the fact that the RSA does not have a procedure to automatically inform the gardaí when a licence has not been surrendered.

At a debate on Road Safety in Dáil Éireann on the 17 April 2024, Green Party TD, Marc Ó Cathasaigh said that the Road Safety Authority “perpetuates a system and culture that places the responsibility for the simple act of getting to and from school” on children who walk and cycle. Social Democrats TD, Catherine Murphy said in the same debate that “the authority is failing people who walk, wheel and cycle by focusing on the least effective road safety measures", while People Before Profit–Solidarity TD, Paul Murphy described the RSA as a "sick joke". Murphy was critical of the RSA's refusal, on data protection grounds, to release details of collisions to local authorities for the past eight years, describing the grounds as "spurious" and not supported by the Data Protection Commissioner.

On the 29 April 2024, a spokesperson for the RSA was challenged by Matt Cooper on the Today FM Last Word programme about the Authority's silence in the face of opposition to proposed road safety interventions. The spokesperson claimed that speaking out on this would "politicise" the Authority. Fine Gael TD, Ciarán Cannon had previously been critical of this silence describing it as "disturbing" and noting that "the RSA is charged with making our roads safer, but doesn’t see the need for it to advocate for the protection of the most vulnerable people on our roads. It should be the most vocal advocate of all".

In May 2024, Social Democrats TD, Catherine Murphy described as "incredible" a decision by the RSA not to appear before the Public Accounts Committee. RSA CEO, Sam Waide, had claimed that the RSA had "limited availability due to immediate road safety priorities". The invitation came on foot of a request by Green Party chief whip, Marc Ó Cathasaigh citing concerns about the sharing of collision data. The Chair of the Public Accounts Committee, Sinn Féin TD Brian Stanley noted that the RSA is accountable to the Comptroller and Auditor General and that "It needs to be brought in here and it will come in here." The committee agreed to request that the RSA appear before the committee on 27 June 2024.

On 15 May 2024, the Dáil passed a Private Member's Motion on Road Safety and Maintenance tabled by Labour TD, Duncan Smith calling for a new strategy from the RSA "that addresses the concerns of all road users including cycling and pedestrian groups" and for "the sharing of traffic collision location data covering both fatalities and injuries between the RSA and local authorities".

In June 2024, Duncan Smith was again critical of the Authority for its failure to fill two vacancies on its board that had been vacant since January of that year. Also in June 2024, a former Garda Chief Superintendent called for a Road Safety "Tsar" to act as a "single voice" for road safety.

At the Public Accounts Committee meeting in June 2024, Deputy Ciarán Cannon described the funding of the authority as "fundamentally flawed" citing a "crucial conflict of interest", with the majority of its funding coming from income generated by cars and drivers.

Criticism of the authority continued in August 2024 with the launch of a new "Lose your Licence, Lose Your Independence" campaign. Ciarán Cannon, TD accused the authority of "over-promotion of driving", while campaign group I BIKE Dublin criticised the authority's "car-centric thinking", reiterating its calls for radical reform of the organisation to "break the links with the motor sales industry". Green Party TD, Neasa Hourigan described the campaign as "ableist and offensive" and called for the Authority to be disbanded. The Irish Cycling Campaign also criticised the use of ableist language describing the campaign as "emblematic of the RSA’s persistent failure to create effective road safety education". It later emerged that a director of the RSA had dismissed the criticism as "silly season coverage", while the chairperson, Liz O’Donnell had advised against withdrawing the ad fearing that the "high production cost and media buying" would lead to further controversy for the Authority and be seen as a "waste of public money".

=== Indecon Report 2024 ===
In July 2024, it was reported that there would be a "major overhaul" of the authority with a separation of the driver and vehicle testing services from the public interest role in road safety advocacy, with some functions moving closer to the Department of Transport

In August 2024, Minister for Transport, Eamon Ryan confirmed that "major changes are on the way" for the Authority which would likely see a separation of responsibilities, while Minister for State, James Lawless said that he believed the agency itself “needs change”, saying that it may need to go “back to basics”. Taoiseach, Simon Harris supported the proposal to remove the licensing and vehicle testing roles from the Authority saying "We do need an agency dedicated wholly and exclusively to road safety and advocacy".

On 1 October 2024 it was announced that the Road Safety Authority would become a Driver and Vehicle Services Agency with a focus on driver licensing and testing services. A new Road Safety Office is proposed to run road safety awareness, education and promotional campaigns.

On 20 October 2024, Minister of State, James Lawless, in a report in the Sunday Times about the legacy of the authority, said that "the failures of the organisation are evident from the report, from the statistics and from what’s been happening for the last three years. Ultimately, the buck has to stop somewhere, and generally stops at the executive of an agency".

On 5 November 2024, the Government published a report by Indecon noted that the RSA does not meet the criteria of a "central road safety authority with adequate human, technical and financial resources" and that "without an authoritative lead agency structure, co-ordinating the shared responsibility for achieving road safety results has little chance of success". It concluded that there was a need for "an authoritative and well-resourced organisation to lead the implementation of the road safety strategy" that would have "statutory powers to fund or direct the role of other agencies or Government Departments".

The Government approved a plan to split the Authority into two independent agencies and the "development of a comprehensive implementation plan to progress this reform". It was also announced that Minister Eamon Ryan would appoint a new chairperson of the Authority to replace the outgoing chair, Liz O’Donnell.

=== 2025/2026 row back on reform ===
In December 2025, Minister of State Seán Canney announced that he was abandoning the reform process. The decision immediately drew strong criticism with road safety groups reasserting the view that the organisation is not "fit for purpose" and Taoiseach Micheál Martin facing strong criticism from opposition TDs during Leaders Questions. Susan Gray of PARC Road Safety Group (Promoting Awareness, Responsibility and Care on our roads) accused the government of not taking the issue seriously and said that "if the RSA was not going to disband then it needed new leaders" while the Irish Road Haulage Association (IRHA) said the decision showed a government "unwilling to confront rising road fatalities or deliver meaningful reform in the transport sector". It later emerged that the decision to abandon the reform process was taken by Minister Canney against the advice of officials in the Department of Transport and was endorsed by Minister for Transport, Darragh O'Brien.

In January 2026, the IRHA wrote to county and city councillors across the country urging them to submit motions of no confidence in the RSA citing the rising death toll and a driver test backlog. It called for organisation to be split into two separate organisations. Kerry County Council had earlier unanimously passed a motion of no confidence in the authority. The motion had been tabled by Cllr Jackie Healy-Rae who claimed that the RSA had become a "communications operation" that was neglecting engineering and infrastructural road safety measures. Also in January, PARC wrote to Ministers O'Brien and Canney saying that it had lost confidence in the Road Safety Authority.

At an Oireachtas Transport Committee meeting in February 2026 representatives of Cycling Ireland, the Irish Cycling Campaign and Dublin Commuters Coalition all called for the reform of the RSA to proceed as per the recommendations of the report. This view was echoed in the Dáil by Labour TD Ciarán Ahern and Green Party leader Roderic O'Gorman.

In February 2026, Louth County Council unanimously passed a motion of no confidence in the Authority "in its current format" while Galway City Council passed a motion calling for a "re-evaluation of the RSA and immediate progress on the Indecon recommendations".

In July 2026, the Authority appeared before the Oireachtas Transport Committee and the issue of reform was raised again with Roderic O'Gorman questioning the ability of the Authority to effectively address road safety concerns, saying that “there’s too many different jobs being done by the one organisation, at a time when last year we had the highest number of road fatalities in many years. It’s not working”. It also emerged that Minister Seán Canney had been critical of the Authority's lack of media presence following two high profile crashes in November 2025.

The Authority came under further criticism in October 2026 when it sought to roll out breathalysers in hotels and pubs at a cost of €1.5 million. After criticism from road safety campaigners and opposition politicians the plan was abandoned on the same day that it had been proposed.
