= Cartell =

Irish vehicle checking company

- Type: Private
- Industry: Vehicle checking
- Founded: 2006; 20 years ago
- Area served: United Kingdom and Ireland
- Website: cartell.ie

Cartell is an Irish vehicle checking company which commenced trading in 2006. It operates an online service to allow prospective vehicle purchasers to verify the history of a vehicle before purchasing. The checks available include details of finance problems, insurance write-offs, ownership history and whether a vehicle was formerly used as a taxi.

== Services ==
Cartell operates an online check system for both private and trade buyers. A free check will show the manufacturer and model of the vehicle when a Vehicle Registration Number is entered. Paid checks allow further information to be obtained for varying fees. Information available includes:

- Checks to identify vehicles written off by an insurance company using the Motor Insurance Anti-Fraud and Theft Register Ireland, an initiative begun by Cartell based on its experience with the UK equivalent
- Checks with lenders to identify outstanding finance issues involving the vehicle
- Mileage checks against the National Mileage Register, a database of Irish-registered vehicles established by Cartell
- Verification of Vehicle Identification Number and registration papers
- Number of previous owners and whether the previous registration was as a private or commercial vehicle
- Vehicle details, including body shape, number of doors, engine number and engine capacity

The firm has an agreement with HPI UK, a similar company based in the United Kingdom, to allow finance, ownership and insurance checks to be carried out on vehicles imported into Ireland from the UK. It also has access to the UK National Mileage Register.

Since 2002, the firm has been attempting to gain access to the Garda Síochána's vehicle theft records, to allow them to check if a vehicle has been previously reported as stolen.

== Publicity ==
=== Vehicle write offs ===
- In 2008, Cartell passed information to the Road Safety Authority about the issue of written-off cars from the UK being imported, repaired and registered for use in Ireland. The subsequent Irish Times article provoked an investigation by the Garda Siochána, Vehicle Registration Unit, Road Safety Authority and Revenue Commissioners. This resulted in a change to legislation requiring that from September 2010 all imported vehicles must be taken to a National Car Test Centre for inspection before being registered in Ireland.
- In 2014, Cartell called for Regulation of Written off vehicles in Ireland estimating there were over 200,000 write offs in the Irish fleet at any time. A subsequent article in the Irish Examiner reported that six deaths a year caused by written off cars
- In January 2014, opposition TD Timmy Dooley (FF) raised the issue in the Dáil. The then Minister for Transport Leo Varadkar (FG) responded by announcing he was set to introduce “Death Certificates” for vehicles written off as the result of collision damage and to appoint the Road Safety Authority to oversee a new process of independently verifying repaired vehicles before they are returned to the roads (Parliamentary Debates, Wednesday, 15 January 2014, Written Answer No. 963).
- In July 2016, the company welcomed reports that Minister for Transport, Shane Ross (Ind), brought new legislation to cabinet to compel insurers to notify his Department of Category A and Category B write-offs.

=== Vehicle clocking ===
- In 2010, the firm's legal branch drafted a legislative proposal proposing outlawing the clocking of vehicle odometers, which was not illegal in Ireland at the time. The principal drafter of the Bill was barrister John P Byrne. It was presented to the Oireachtas by Cartell director Jeff Aherne and recommended by Tommy Broughan TD, who at the time was the Labour Party transport spokesman, but did not progress into law.

== Road Traffic (Amendment) Bill 2012 ==
Following the failure of their suggested vehicle clocking legislation in 2010 Cartell continued to press the bill, and in December 2012, it was presented again by Anthony Lawlor TD as the Road Traffic (Amendment) Bill 2012. On 17 December, the bill passed the first stage in the approval process. Meanwhile, Lawlor continued to press the government on the issue and managed to bring it to the attention of transport minister Leo Varadkar. As a result, on 15 January 2014, the content of Lawlor's bill was inserted as an amendment in the Road Traffic (No. 2) Bill 2013, creating a new criminal offence of interfering with the odometer of a mechanically propelled vehicle. The maximum penalty for the offence is a Class C fine (up to €2,500) or up to three months imprisonment. With this amendment in place Lawlor noted that Cartell had been responsible for bringing the issue to his attention, then withdrew his private member’s bill. The bill had its second reading on 21 January 2014 and on 25 February, was enacted as the Road Traffic Act 2014. The new offence became law as Section 14 of the Act.

== 2013 Request for release of stolen vehicle information ==
On 17 July 2013, Cartell again called on the Garda to release details of stolen cars. Ireland is currently the only nation in the European Union where the police do not make details of stolen cars available to car check agencies or directly to the public. In all other EU member states this information is uploaded to Interpol, which allows instant checks to be made on any suspect vehicle. Currently any search done on an Irish-registered vehicle will not reveal if the vehicle has been reported stolen. Around 10,000 cars are stolen every year in Ireland and about 2,000 of these are never recovered. Currently buyers of used cars have no way to check against theft records, and hundreds of buyers a year lose an average of from €10,000 to €20,000 after buying stolen cars which are then discovered and returned to their original owner. The Garda claim that they cannot pass on the information because of data protection issues.

== Sporting sponsorship ==
In 2010, Cartell became official sponsor for the Rally of the Lakes, agreeing to sponsor the event until at least 2013. In March 2014, Cartell's sponsorship of the event was extended for a further three years.
