= Come, Come, Ye Saints =

Latter-day Saint hymn

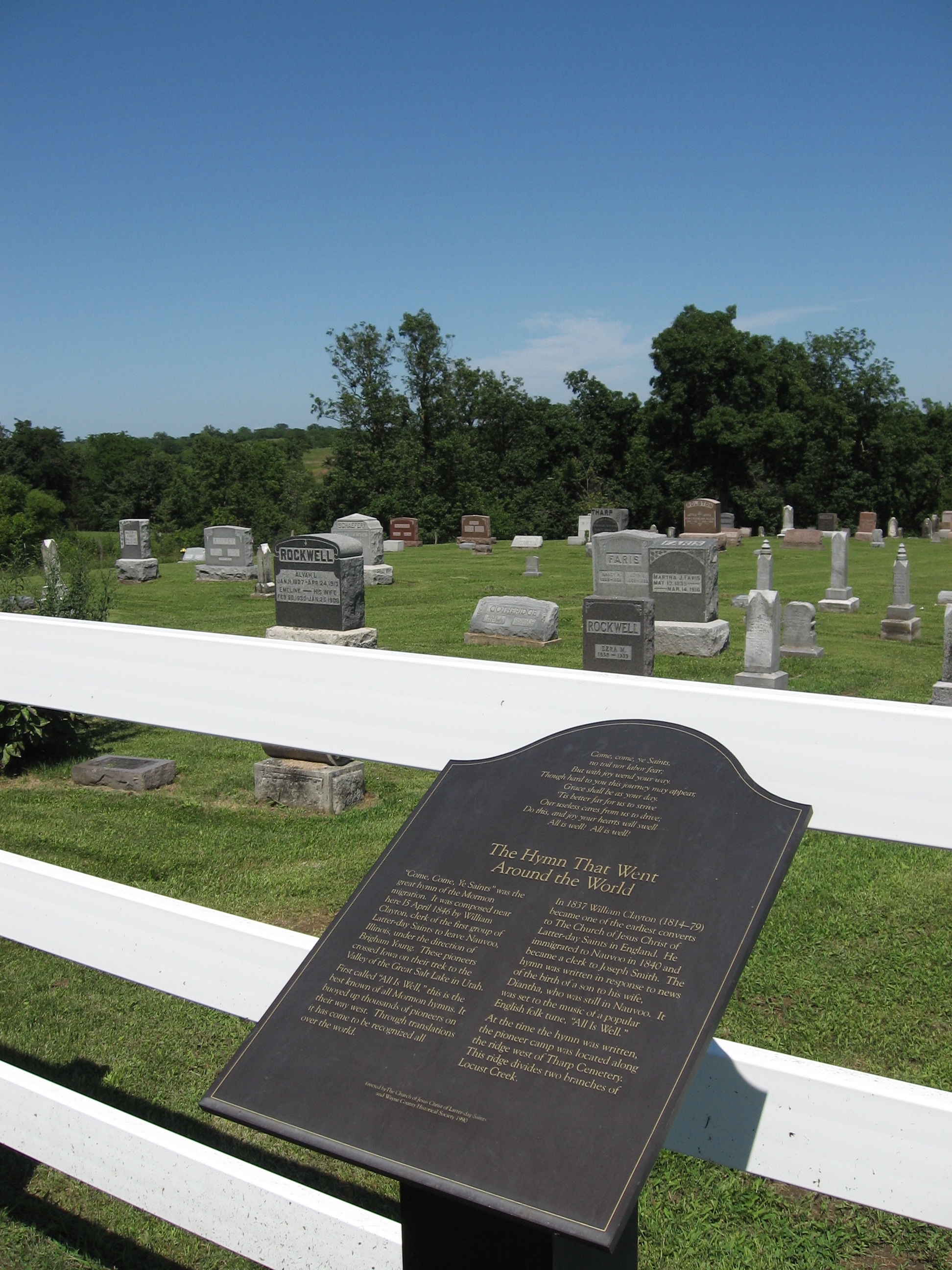
Commemorative plaque at Locust Creek, in Wayne County, Iowa, where William Clayton composed the hymn

"Come, Come, Ye Saints" (originally "All is Well") is one of the best-known Latter-day Saint hymns. The lyrics were written in 1846 by Mormon poet William Clayton. The hymn has been called the anthem of the nineteenth-century Mormon pioneers,, "the landmark Mormon anthem," and "the Marseillaise of the Latter Days."

Clayton wrote the hymn "All is Well" on April 15, 1846, as his Mormon pioneer caravan rested at Locust Creek, Iowa, over 100 miles west of its origin city of Nauvoo, Illinois. Just prior to writing the lyrics, Clayton had received word that one of his wives, Diantha, had given birth to a healthy boy in Nauvoo. It was set to the music of a popular English folk tune, "All is Well."

The lyrics of the hymn were originally published in 1848 in a small collection known as Songs from the Mountains and were added to an official LDS hymnbook in the 1851 edition of the Manchester Hymnal. The hymn was published with the current music (the "Winter Quarters" tune) for the first time in the 1889 edition of the Latter-day Saints' Psalmody. The hymn was renamed "Come, Come, Ye Saints" and is hymn number 30 in the current LDS Church hymnal. A men's arrangement of the hymn is number 326 of the same hymnal.

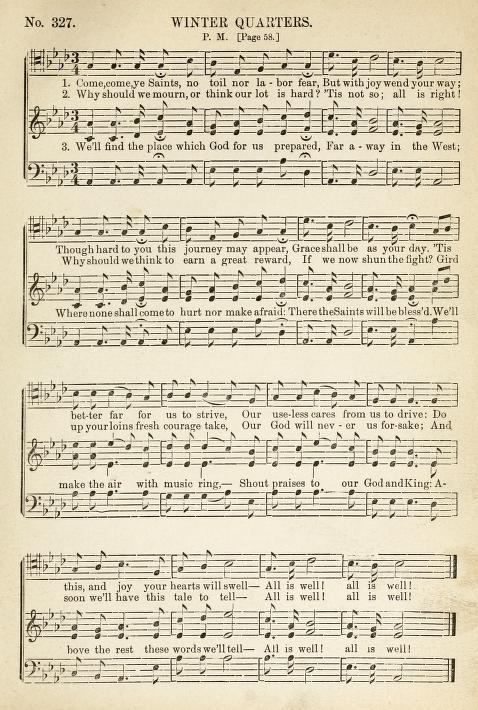
"All Is Well" published in the Latter-day Saints' Psalmody

"Come, Come, Ye Saints" features prominently in celebrations of Pioneer Day in Utah and in performances of the Tabernacle Choir at Temple Square. Arrangements of the song have also consistently been used in the daily organ recitals at Temple Square. A musical motif referencing the first line of "Come, Come Ye Saints" is used at the end of official broadcasts and videos released by the Church of Jesus Christ of Latter-day Saints.

The hymn also appears in a Protestant hymnal, the United Church of Christ's New Century Hymnal, with alternate lyrics for the LDS-oriented third verse written by lyricist Avis B. Christianson. Another version by Joseph F. Green is contained in the Seventh-day Adventist Hymnal.

== Lyrics ==
Come, come, ye saints, no toil nor labor fear;
But with joy wend your way.
Though hard to you this journey may appear,
Grace shall be as your day.
Tis better far for us to strive
Our useless cares from us to drive;
Do this, and joy your hearts will swell -
All is well! All is well!

Why should we mourn or think our lot is hard?
'Tis not so; all is right.
Why should we think to earn a great reward
If we now shun the fight?
Gird up your loins; fresh courage take.
Our God will never us forsake;
And soon we'll have this tale to tell-
All is well! All is well!

We'll find the place which God for us prepared,
Far away, in the West,
Where none shall come to hurt or make afraid;
There the saints, will be blessed.
We'll make the air, with music ring,
Shout praises to our God and King;
Above the rest these words we'll tell -
All is well! All is well!

And should we die before our journey's through,
Happy day! All is well!
We then are free from toil and sorrow, too;
With the just we shall dwell!
But if our lives are spared again
To see the Saints their rest obtain,
Oh, how we'll make this chorus swell-
All is well! All is well!

== Original "All Is Well" Lyrics ==
The lyrics of a verse from the original hymn that Clayton based his text on is as follows:

What's this that steals, that steals upon my frame?
Is it death? Is it death?
That soon will quench, will quench this mortal frame.
Is it death? Is it death?
If this be death, I soon shall be
From every pain and sorrow free:
I shall the king of glory see--
All is well! All is well!
