= William Clayton (Latter Day Saint) =

American religious leader

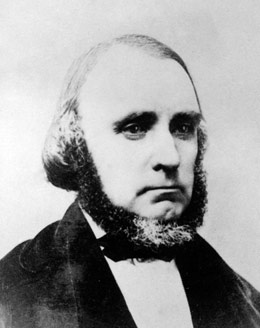

Member and Clerk of the Council of Fifty
- March 11, 1844 – December 4, 1879
- Called by: Joseph Smith

Personal details
- Born: July 17, 1814; Penwortham, Lancashire, England, United Kingdom
- Died: December 4, 1879 (aged 65); Salt Lake City, Utah Territory, United States
- Resting place: Salt Lake City Cemetery; 40°46′37.92″N 111°51′28.8″W
- Known For: An early leader in the Latter Day Saint movement, clerk and scribe to Joseph Smith, and credited with inventing a version of the modern odometer
- Spouse(s): 10
- Children: 42
- Parents: Thomas Clayton and Ann Critchley
- Signature

William H. Clayton (July 17, 1814 – December 4, 1879) was a clerk, scribe, and friend to the religious leader Joseph Smith. Clayton, born in England, was also an American pioneer journalist, inventor, lyricist, and musician. He joined the Church of Jesus Christ of Latter Day Saints in 1837 and served as the second counselor to the British mission president Joseph Fielding while proselyting in Manchester. He led a group of British converts in emigrating to the United States in 1840 and eventually settled in Nauvoo, Illinois, where he befriended Joseph Smith and became his clerk and scribe. He was a member of the Council of Fifty and Smith's private prayer circle.

Clayton participated in plural marriage before it was practiced openly. His first plural wife was Margaret Moon, his sister-in-law, whom he married in 1843. He eventually married ten women, although three of his wives left or divorced him. He had at least 42 children by these wives. He moved to Winter Quarters in 1846 and wrote the words for the hymn "Come, Come, Ye Saints". He was a member of the first company to make the overland trek to the Salt Lake Valley, where he collaborated to devise a roadometer to measure distances for his The Latter-Day Saints' Emigrants' Guide.

Clayton's journals are an important resource for historians in Mormon studies. Clayton's journals were used as a source for Joseph Smith's History of the Church and for two sections of the Doctrine and Covenants. Three of Clayton's notebooks from when he lived in Nauvoo have been part of the closed archive of the Church History Department for the Church of Jesus Christ of Latter-day Saints (LDS Church). Jerald and Sandra Tanner published portions of the Clayton journals that appeared in the notes of a Brigham Young University student in 1982. George D. Smith relied on this copy to publish his An Intimate Chronicle: The Journals of William Clayton. James B. Allen, who made a transcript of the Nauvoo diaries when he worked in the LDS Church's History Division under Leonard Arrington, published more text from the Nauvoo journals in his reprint of his William Clayton biography entitled No Toil Nor Labor Fear. The LDS Church History Library announced in October 2017 that they would publish William Clayton's complete diaries.

== Early life and conversion in England ==
Clayton was born in Penwortham, Lancashire, England, the son of Thomas Clayton and Ann Critchley, on July 17, 1814. He was the eldest of 14 children. As a child, he learned to play the violin and piano, and was tutored by his father, a school teacher. He married Ruth Moon on October 9, 1836. In 1837, Clayton investigated The Church of Jesus Christ of Latter-day Saints. Taught by church apostles Heber C. Kimball and Orson Hyde, Clayton was baptized October 21, 1837; ordained a priest in December; and a high priest on April 1, 1838. Clayton's parents, 10 surviving siblings, and some of his wife's family also joined the church. In 1838, he served as second counselor to the British mission president Joseph Fielding, with Willard Richards as first counselor. Clayton became a missionary in England, where he grew a branch of the church in Manchester to about 240 members.

== Move to Nauvoo ==
In September 1840, Clayton led a group of British converts who emigrated to the United States on the ship North America. They arrived in New York on 11 October 1840. He and his family first tried to farm in Iowa Territory, then settled in the predominantly Latter Day Saint community of Nauvoo, Illinois. There he was a clerk and scribe to Joseph Smith from 1842-1844, where he recorded Smith's sermons and helped him write letters. He also wrote in the record book of the Nauvoo Masonic Lodge. Clayton was good friends with Smith and they sometimes referred to each other as David and Jonathan. In an 1840 letter, Clayton wrote to church members in Manchester about interacting with Smith, assuring them that Smith was "a man of sound judgment, and possessed of abundance of intelligence." He described listening to him as a spiritual experience "which expands your mind and causes your heart to rejoice."

Clayton also played in the Nauvoo brass band and worked as the city treasurer. He was a recorder and clerk of the Nauvoo City Council, an officer in the Nauvoo Music Association, a member of the church's influential Council of Fifty, and a member of Joseph Smith's private prayer circle where the Latter Day Saint temple ceremonies were first introduced. He worked as a temple recorder and tracked donations and purchases during the temple's construction. Clayton frequently assessed and sold land and took business trips in his work for Joseph Smith. After Joseph Smith's death, Clayton recorded the endowments made by members in the Nauvoo temple before starting their exodus.

== Plural marriage ==
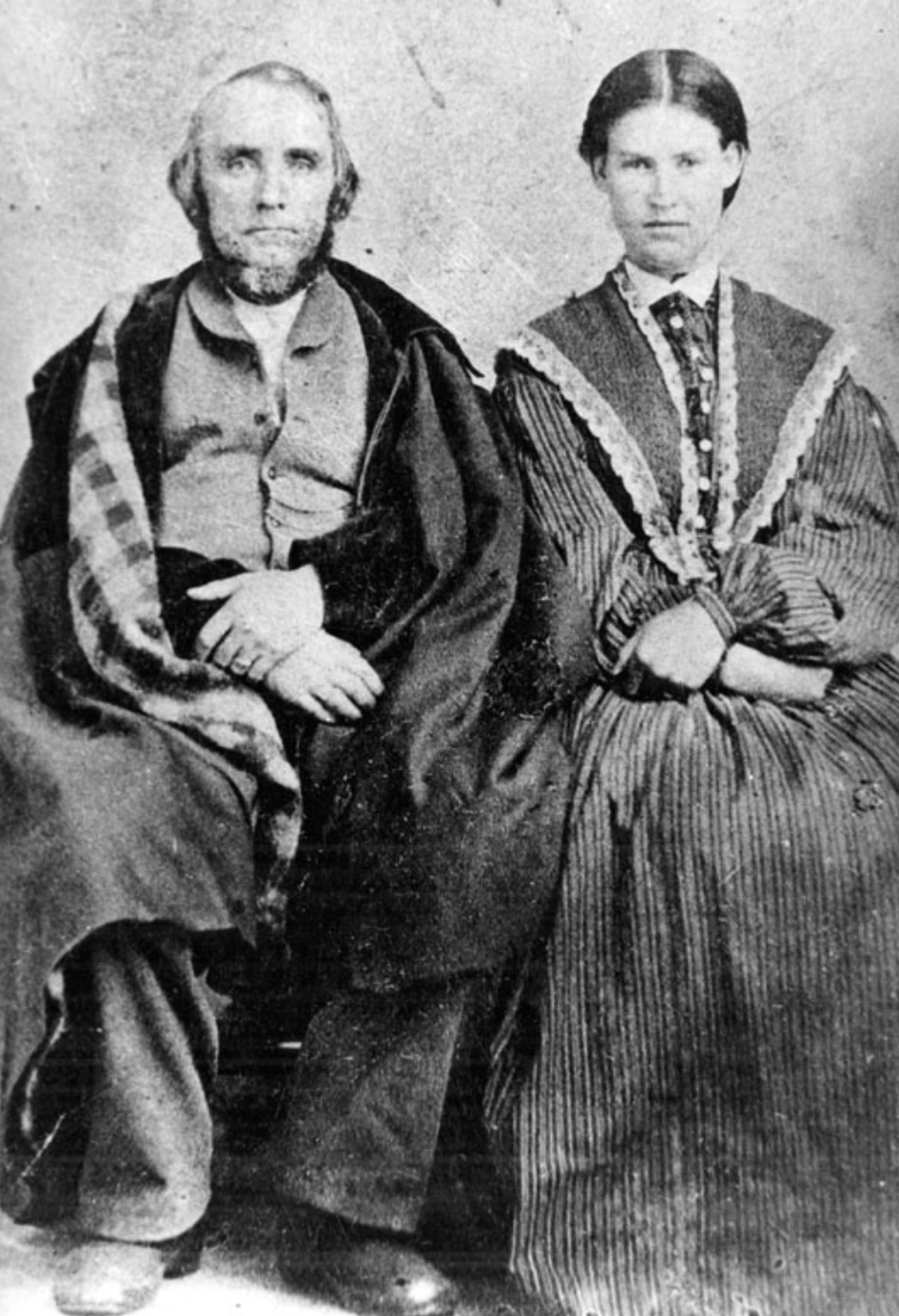
William Clayton with his wife Diantha

Clayton accepted plural marriage as a religious principle. He is reported to have preached in 1873 that a man could only enter the Celestial Kingdom by having more than one wife. Other church leaders disagreed with the teaching. They did agree that a man should take more than one wife when "Personally commanded [...] by the Almighty through his servants". Clayton ultimately married ten wives though three of his wives later left him. He married his first wife, Ruth Moon, before leaving England. He married four wives in Nauvoo and five more in Utah. His ten wives together bore him at least 42 children, with Ruth bearing him ten children.

Clayton married four women in Nauvoo. Margaret Moon, Ruth's younger sister, on April 27, 1843, when plural marriage was still done in secret. At the time, Margaret was engaged to marry Aaron Farr, who was on a mission elsewhere. Seeing Margaret's emotional distress when Farr returned, Clayton asked Joseph Smith if they could annul the marriage, but he said no. Margaret insisted that she wanted to stay with Clayton, perhaps because she was already pregnant by him. On finding out that Margaret was Clayton's second wife, Margaret's mother, Lydia Moon, expressed her strong disapproval, threatening to commit suicide or move out. In order to avoid rumors about Margaret's pregnancy, Joseph Smith advised Clayton that Margaret should stay home until the baby was born. Margaret gave birth in February 1844 to a baby boy who died six months later. Margaret and Clayton later had five other children together. Clayton married Alice Hardman on September 13, 1844. He knew her from his time in the LDS Church in Manchester. Alice did not live in the Clayton home, but Clayton visited her in her own home, and they had four children together. They divorced in 1858. Clayton also married Alice's cousin, Jane Hardman, on May 31, 1840. They were sealed on November 20. 1844, but their marriage failed and she did not accompany Clayton when he left Nauvoo in 1846. Clayton also married Diantha Farr, younger sister to Margaret's once-fiancee, Aaron Farr. They were married on January 9, 1845. Diantha continued to live with her parents and was in late pregnancy when Clayton left Nauvoo with his other family members in February 1846. Diantha died on September 11, 1850, shortly after the birth of her third child.

After settling in the Salt Lake valley, Clayton married several more teenage women. He married Augusta Braddock, aged 17, on October 5, 1850. They had eight children together. He married Sarah Ann Walters when she was 18 years old on November 30, 1856, and they had eleven children together. Their youngest child was born after Clayton's death in 1879. He married Amasa Lyman's daughter, Maria Louisa Lyman, age 17, in 1866, and they had one child together. Maria taught Clayton's children until she left Clayton's household to join her father Amasa when he joined the Godbeites. They were separated when she filed for divorce with the state in 1871. In 1870, he married Anna Elizabeth Higgs, also when she was 17 years old, with whom he had four children. There were rumors that a non-Mormon had romanced Anna. She left home, selling many of her possessions while travelling south in 1873, but was shortly afterwards reconciled with Clayton. Clayton also married a widowed cousin of Ruth and Margaret at her request, Elizabeth Ainsworth, when she was 48. They did not have any children together.

Excepts from Clayton's diaries and recorded stories about his involvement in plural marriage are featured in Laurel Thatcher Ulrich's book, A House Full of Females: Plural Marriage and Women's Rights in Early Mormonism, 1835-1870.

== Migration to the west ==
Late in February 1846, Clayton left Nauvoo after a flurry of work making and packing records in the office and new Nauvoo temple. He spent the winter of 1846–47 at Winter Quarters, Nebraska. The following year, he was a member of the vanguard company that crossed the plains to select a western site for Mormon colonization. He was a recording scribe for Brigham Young, President of the Quorum of the Twelve Apostles, during the journey. Several months later, Clayton returned to the mid-West to prepare his family for the overland trek. Travelling in the Heber C. Kimball Company, they arrived in Salt Lake City in September 1848. Clayton's pioneer journal is an important account of the expedition.

=== "Come, Come, Ye Saints" and other hymns ===
In April 1846, while camped near Locust Creek on the plains of Iowa, Clayton wrote the words to the popular Mormon hymn, now known as "Come, Come, Ye Saints", which is sung to the music of a traditional English song, "All is Well". The hymn was in response to good news from Nauvoo. One of his plural wives, Diantha, had given birth to a healthy baby boy, William Adriel Benoni Clayton. In his journal, he stated that he "composed a new song—'All is well.' I feel to thank my heavenly father for my boy and pray that he will spare and preserve his life and that of his mother and so order it so that we may soon meet again." This hymn signified the difficulties and faith involved in the Mormon migration to the west and was popular among pioneer Latter-day Saints. In a 1951 article for the Improvement Era, Heber J. Grant wrote that he specifically requested that congregations sing the fourth verse about accepting death and not end with the third verse. The hymn appears in the Protestant New Church Hymnal with the third verse changed to refer to a heavenly resting place rather than one in the far west. Clayton's hymn "When First the Glorious Light of Truth" also appeared in LDS hymnals, He also wrote words for "A Deluded Mormon" and "The pioneers at length are come."

=== The Roadometer and The Latter-day Saints' Emigrants' Guide ===
Clayton, along with Orson Pratt and Appleton Milo Harmon, created a novel design for a wooden odometer for use on wagons, also called a roadometer. Clayton was assigned to record the number of miles the company traveled each day. One day, Clayton personally counted the revolutions of a wagon wheel and computed the day's distance by multiplying the count by the wheel's circumference. Clayton asked Pratt to develop a design for a wagon odometer. It consisted of a set of wooden cog wheels attached to the hub of a wagon wheel, with the mechanism "counting" or recording by position the revolutions of the wheel. The apparatus was built by the company's carpenter Appleton Milo Harmon.

The wagon-mounted odometer helped Clayton measure accurate distances between landmarks, starting from Council Bluffs and going to the Great Salt Lake. After returning to Winter Quarters, Clayton prepared and published The Latter-Day Saints' Emigrants' Guide. Clayton's guide was the first to scientifically measure the distances on the overland trail and was in high demand.

== Life after immigrating to Utah ==
Clayton served a second mission in England starting in September 1852. He was briefly president of the Sheffield and Lincolnshire Conferences before being released in April 1853 and returning home to Utah in October of the same year.

Once settled in Utah, Clayton continued to maintain church records and also participated in public and private business activities. He became an auditor for Utah Territory, as well as recorder of marks and brands, holding both positions until his death. Clayton also worked as treasurer of the Deseret Telegraph Company and as secretary of Zion's Co-operative Mercantile Institution (ZCMI), a church based cooperative business enterprise. Private ventures included collecting debts, filing land claims, acting as a legal advocate, lending money, merchandising, farming, and mining speculation. Clayton was active in cultural activities in the Salt Lake Valley, particularly those associated with music. He died in Salt Lake City on December 4, 1879. He was buried at Salt Lake City Cemetery.

Clayton is listed as one of the original pioneers on Cyrus Dallin's Brigham Young Monument in Temple Square.

== Journal and personal records ==
Clayton recorded his daily activities in a series of personal journals. His first journal starts on January 1, 1840 and recounts his experiences as a missionary in Manchester and his migration to America. George Smith, a compiler of Clayton's journals, called it Clayton's "England and Emigration" journal. It is possible that Clayton was inspired by Heber C. Kimball's daily record-keeping. He stopped keeping a personal journal on February 19, 1842, when he started to help with bookkeeping for the Nauvoo temple's construction. Clayton's Nauvoo journals start on November 27, 1842. As Joseph Smith's personal secretary and friend, he attended most meetings, where he often took minutes. Clayton's Nauvoo journals describe how Joseph Smith and others practiced plural marriage before 1843. On July 12, 1843, Joseph Smith dictated his revelation on plural marriage to William Clayton. The journals also describe how Nauvoo functioned independently from the state of Illinois. Clayton recorded activities related to the temple in Heber C. Kimball's journal beginning on December 10, 1845. While Clayton adopted the voice of Kimball in the journal, Smith argued that it should be considered one of Clayton's journals, as it contains his "distinctive style." James B. Allen, Clayton's biographer, argued that this journal should not be considered one of Clayton's journals, on the basis that scribes were frequently employed to keep the journals of church leaders.

Clayton's handwriting is not identified in Joseph Smith's History of the Church. However, about 50 entries in the History of the Church use Clayton's diaries as a source, according to Allen. George A. Smith reported using Clayton's notes on Smith's sermons to fill out the text of the sermons, which was difficult because the notes typically only had two or three words per sentence of sermon. Section 129 in the Doctrine and Covenants, on using a handshake to determine the nature of a being claiming to be sent by God, comes from Clayton's diary, as does section 131. Clayton's notes were one of four sources used to reconstruct a sermon by Smith known as the "King Follett Discourse". Clayton's work as a recorder for the church in "The Book of the Law of the Lord" is also a source for parts of History of the Church. Sections of Clayton's journals provide a detailed description of the Nauvoo Temple and an account of the Latter Day Saints' efforts to complete temple endowments for all interested members before being forced to leave Illinois. A summary of Joseph Smith's "translation" of the Kinderhook plates are also in Clayton's journals.

There has been some controversy over the publication of William Clayton's diaries. Three of Clayton's notebooks from when he lived in Nauvoo have long been part of the closed archive of the Church History Department. In 1982, Jerald and Sandra Tanner published typed excerpts from Clayton's Nauvoo diaries between January 22, 1843, and January 28, 1846. Their excerpts came from a copy from Andrew Ehat's notes. Ehat charged the Tanners with copyright violation, but a judge ruled that his transcript was a copy of preexisting material and not copyrightable. Copies of Ehat's notes had circulated among Mormon studies scholars before the Tanners published them. In the Tanner's selected quotations of the court transcript, James B. Allen stated that he had made a transcript of the Nauvoo diaries when he worked at the church archives under Leonard Arrington. Allen stated that he made a copy for Dean Jessee, a history professor at BYU. Ehat had copied some of Jessee's transcript in his notes. In a discussion of how he selected the text for his abridgement of William Clayton's journals in An Intimate Chronicle (1995), George D. Smith explained that he used "a variety of official and unofficial sources" in compiling text of the Nauvoo journals. In his review of An Intimate Chronicle, Allen stated that Smith's inclusion of the Nauvoo diaries relied almost entirely on the Jerald and Sandra Tanner version of Ehat's notes.

In 2002, new text from the journals became available when Allen published a reprinting of his Clayton biography entitled No Toil Nor Labor Fear. The new printing included two appendices: a side-by-side comparison of William Clayton's diary entries (from 1842–44) with the text of the Joseph Smith's History of the Church, as well as Clayton's "History of the Nauvoo Temple." A post on the By Common Consent blog from 2017 states that the first appendix was the only source for the original source material for the Doctrine and Covenants sections that come from Clayton's diary until the second volume of the Joseph Smith Papers was published in 2011. Excerpts of the Clayton Nauvoo diaries in D. Michael Quinn's research papers showed "thirty percent more text" than the widely circulated Ehat notes. An "unidentified party" copied and circulated Quinn's copy of the Nauvoo diaries in 2010. Laurel Thatcher Ulrich had access to the original holograph in her research for A House Full of Females (2017). In October 2017, the LDS Church History Library announced that the Church Historian's Press would publish William Clayton's diaries, complete with transcription and annotation.

== See also ==
- Nauvoo Brass Band

== Works cited ==
- Allen, James B. (2002). No Toil Nor Labor Fear: The Story of William Clayton. Provo, UT: Brigham Young University Press. ISBN 0842525033.
- Allen, James B.; Leonard, Glen M. (2013) [1976]. The Story of the Latter-day Saints (2nd ed.). Deseret Book. ISBN 978-0-87747-594-1.
- Allen, James B.; Smith, George D. (Summer 1997). "Editing William Clayton and the Politics of Mormon History" (PDF). Dialogue. 30 (2).
- Cracroft, Richard H. "Oh, What Songs of the Heart": Zion's Hymns as Sung by the Pioneers," included in Walker, Ronald W. and Dant, Doris R., "Nearly Everything Imaginable: The Everyday life of Utah's Mormon Pioneers," 1999, Brigham Young University Press, Provo, Utah. ISBN 0-8425-2397-9.
- Dahl, Paul E. (1964). William Clayton: Missionary, Pioneer, and Public Servant (MA thesis). Brigham Young University.
- Smith, George D. (1995). "Introduction". An Intimate Chronicle: The Journals of William Clayton. Salt Lake City: Signature Books. ISBN 1560850221.
- Hymns The Church of Jesus Christ of Latter-day Saints, copyright 1948, printed 1978
