= Roadometer (odometer) =

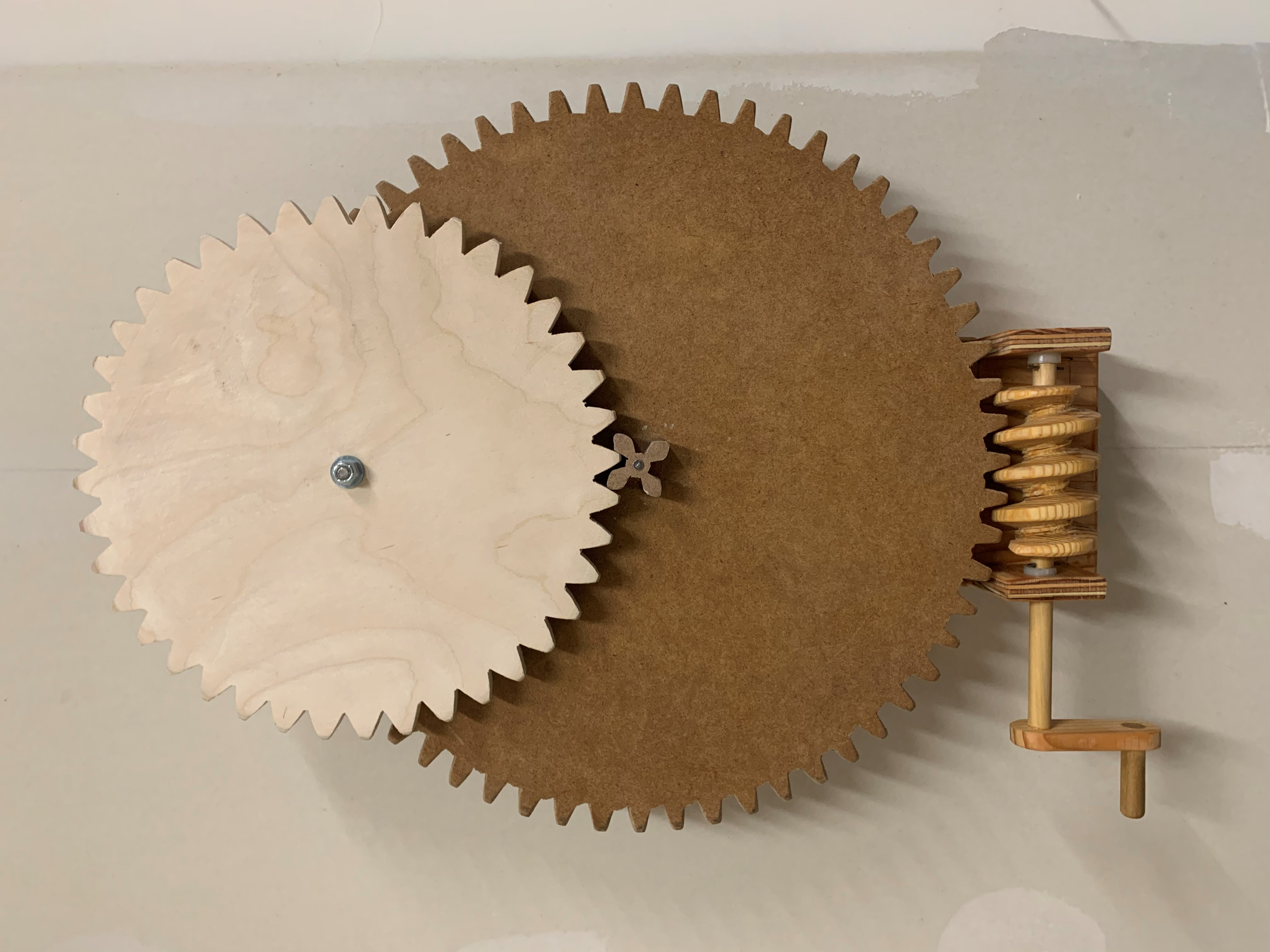
Replica of the 1847 roadometer, handmade by Jeff Niven using Larry Howell's measurements

The roadometer was a 19th-century device like an odometer for measuring mileage, mounted on a wagon wheel. One such device was invented in 1847 by William Clayton, Orson Pratt, and Appleton Harmon, pioneers of the Church of Jesus Christ of Latter-day Saints.

== History ==
Brass odometers were used by many pioneers making the westward trek in the 1840s. However, the design of Clayton, Pratt, and Harmon's odometer was new. In 1847, William Clayton accompanied the first expedition to the Utah Territory as a writer and record-keeper. He initially counted revolutions of a wagon wheel to calculate the distance they had travelled. He tired of counting wheel revolutions and wanted a device that could measure the distance a wagon travelled. Clayton asked Orson Pratt if it would be possible to make such a device, and Pratt created the design. Harmon carved the gears out of wood and may have further refined the design. They started using the roadometer around May 12. Three hundred and sixty revolutions of the wagon wheel equaled one mile. A piece on the hub of the wheel turned a shaft one revolution for every six revolutions of the wagon wheel. Then one revolution of that shaft moved a 60 tooth gear by one tooth. "The second gear wheel had forty teeth [and] overlaid the first gear and was turned by four teeth on the axle of that gear. One rotation of the second gear therefore represented ten miles each tooth being one quarter of a mile." Unfortunately, the small four-toothed gear swelled in the rain and was not functional for much of the journey. Clayton used their invention to provide an estimate of the distance their party traveled each day between Omaha, Nebraska, and Salt Lake City, Utah. William Clayton returned to Winter Quarters from the Salt Lake Valley. He had a new odometer built by William A. King that could measure a thousand miles for the return trip. Clayton published the distances and other helpful travel information in his popular The Latter-day Saints' Emigrants' Guide.

== Later documentation of Clayton's odometer ==
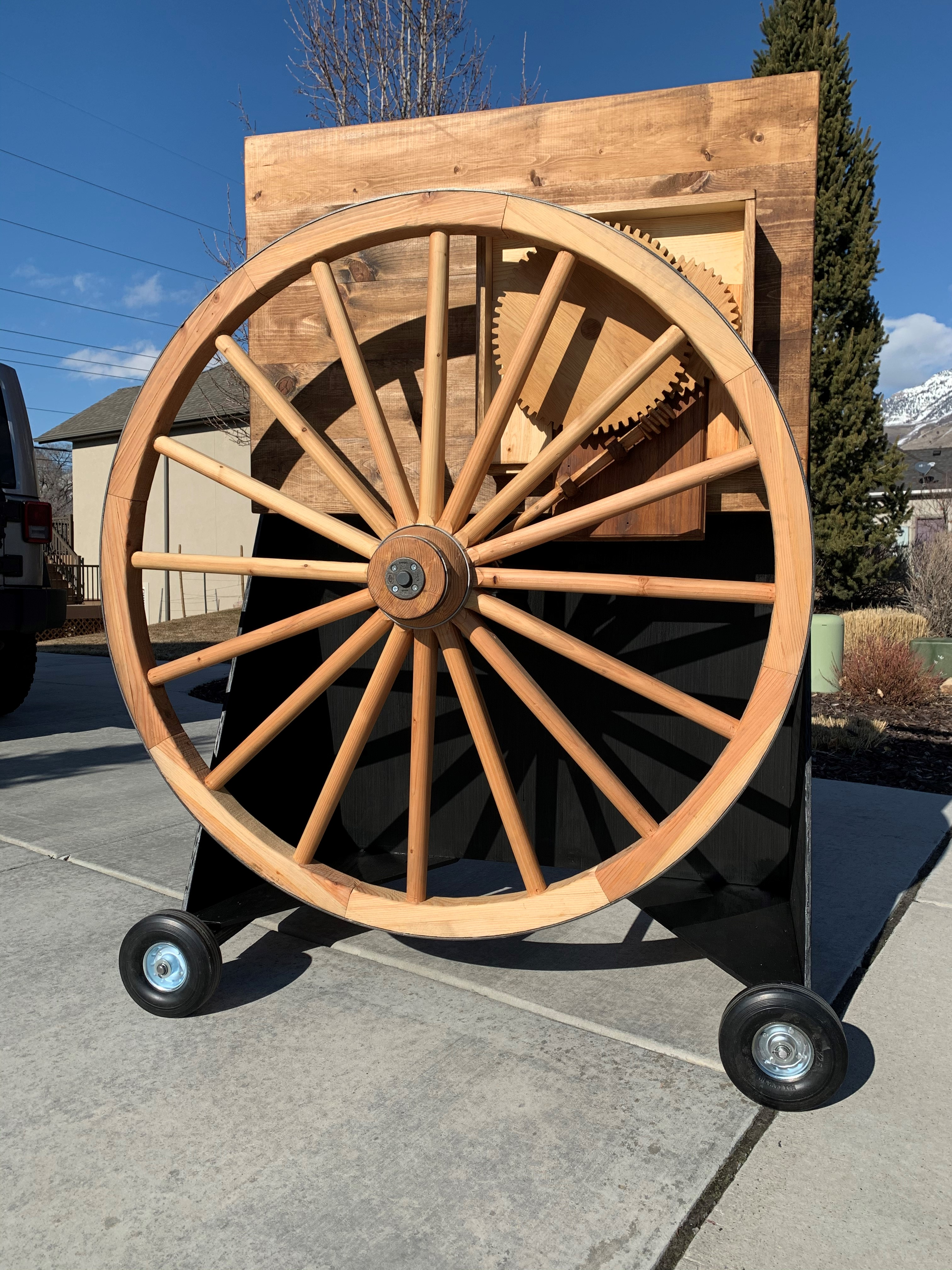
Replica of the 1847 roadometer at the Provo Pioneer Village. Jeffrey Niven created this replica with hand tools. He referenced the machine-cut replica created by Joey Jacobson, which used Larry Howell's calculations of the dimensions. Those calculations came from historical sources.

Video of how the axle interfaces with a replica of the 1847 pioneer odometer.

A machine commonly displayed as Clayton's odometer is actually one built in 1876 by Thomas G. Lowe. Lowe created his odometer to calculate the distance between villages in northern Arizona. He gave his odometer to the Deseret Museum in Salt Lake City, and it was on display with accurate information from 1876 until it closed for a period in 1903. When the museum reopened in 1911, they displayed his odometer with the incorrect information that it had been made by Appleton Harmon and William Clayton. Lowe's odometer was visibly different from Clayton's. It had four toothed gears and a ratchet-like drive mechanism. Lowe attempted to correct the misinformation when he visited in 1921, but the information was not corrected until 1983. Steven Pratt created a replica of Clayton's odometer which was on display at the Museum of Church History and Art.

A 1921 news article in the Deseret News claimed that Clayton's original odometer was "the first of its kind". The paper published a correction from an engineer, who clarified that odometers existed as early as 12 B.C. in Rome. The incorrect idea that Clayton's odometer was the first persisted.

Brigham Young University engineering professor Larry Howell built a replica of the roadometer in 2006. He stated that his replica was more accurate than Steven Pratt's. He published information about the rebuild at the 2006 symposium for the American Society of Mechanical Engineers. According to Howell's calculations, the 60-tooth gear's diameter was 15 inches, the 40-tooth gear's diameter was 10 inches, and the 4-tooth gear's diameter was 1 inch.
