= Collection of Sacred Hymns =

Collection of Sacred Hymns may refer to various hymnals of the Latter Day Saint movement:

- Collection of Sacred Hymns (Kirtland, Ohio), the first hymnal of the Latter Day Saint Church, published 1835 or 1836, 90 hymn texts
- Collection of Sacred Hymns (Manchester, England), or Manchester Hymnal, first published in 1840, 277 hymn texts
- Collection of Sacred Hymns (Nauvoo, Illinois), by Emma Smith, published 1841, 304 hymn texts
