= Praise to the Man (album) =

Studio album by The Tabernacle Choir at Temple Square
- Released: January 13, 2009
- Producer: Mack Wilberg

Professional ratings
Review scores
Source	Rating
AllMusic	n/a

Praise to the Man is a religious album released by the Tabernacle Choir at Temple Square. This album honors and gives tribute to Joseph Smith.

== Track listing ==
1. The Morning Breaks
2. Praise to the Man
3. Joseph Smith's First Prayer
4. Now We'll Sing with One Accord
5. This is My Beloved Son
6. I Saw a Mighty Angel Fly
7. An Angel From on High
8. Adam-ondi-Ahman
9. On a Golden Springtime
10. Come, Listen to a Prophet's Voice
11. A Poor Wayfaring Man of Grief
12. We Thank Thee, O God, For a Prophet

== Charts ==
Chart (2009)	Peak position
Billboard 200	102
Billboard Classical	6
