= Collection of Sacred Hymns (Nauvoo, Illinois) =

In Nauvoo, Illinois, in 1841, Emma Smith published an expanded version of the 1835 Collection of Sacred Hymns (Kirtland, Ohio). The new hymnal contained 304 hymns (340 pages before the index), in words-only format. Of these, 77 hymns had been included in the 1835 hymnbook. Many of the hymns included in the 1841 hymnal were more focused on grace, the blood of Christ, and the cross than other LDS hymn collections. Examples include "Amazing Grace", "Come, Thou Fount of Every Blessing", and "When I Survey the Wondrous Cross". After the succession crisis in the early Latter Day Saint movement following Joseph Smith's death, this hymnal was largely ignored in favor of the Manchester Hymnal by those church members who followed the Quorum of the Twelve and moved to the Salt Lake Valley. In the Reorganized Church of Jesus Christ of Latter Day Saints, however, the opposite was true.

Editions of this hymnal are very rare – in 2007, Swann Galleries in New York auctioned one, along with a first edition of the Book of Mormon, for $180,000.

== Background ==
Following the publication of the 1835 hymnbook, a few unauthorized hymnals were published. Recognizing a growing need for hymnals in Mormon congregations in the eastern United States, David Rogers published a new version of the hymnal in 1838. The style, preface, layout, and many of the hymns were copied from the official 1835 hymn book, but forty of the ninety hymns were swapped out. Around thirty of the new hymns were written by Mormons, including five by the influential apostle Parley P. Pratt. A year later, Benjamin C. Elsworth published another hymnal that also plagiarized Emma Smith’s preface and used sixty-six hymns from her collection, as well as almost all the ones Rogers had added. By 1 July 1839, the prophet and Quorum of the Twelve met to compile a new hymnbook, and apparently even weighed the idea of reprinting or adapting Rogers’s work. At a Church conference that fall, however, Rogers’s work was publicly criticized and it was requested that it be “utterly discarded by the church.” Six months later, charges were brought against Rogers for “compiling an Hymn Book, and selling it as the one selected and published by sister Emma Smith,” among other things. Despite the unauthorized nature of Rogers's hymnal, it demonstrated a need for new hymnbooks and a trend towards using hymns authorized by Latter Day Saints.

== Publication ==
In October 1839, an LDS high council “voted that Sister Emma Smith, select and publish a hymn Book for the use of the Church, and that Brigham Young be informed of the same, and he not publish the hymns taken by him from Commerce.” Emma's hymnal would be published in 1841 as an updated version of the 1835 hymnal, using the same preface and 77 of the 90 hymns in the older collection. Joseph Smith indicated his desire that it would contain “a greater variety of Hymns,” and it contained 304 in all. Prior to its printing, both Hyrum Smith and Joseph Smith discouraged printing hymnals other than reprints of the 1835 edition outside of Church headquarters so that the forthcoming new edition could receive the “immediate inspection of Joseph and his councilors” and be considered “a standard work.” Many of the hymns included in the finished work reflected a shift back to traditional Protestant hymns. The Zionism of earlier hymnals was largely replaced by an emphasis on revivalist, grace-oriented phraseology and intimate introspection about Jesus and the cross rather than communal rejoicing in God's redemption of Israel. Several of W. W. Phelps's “corrected” hymns reverted to the original versions, and well-known grace-focused hymns like “Come, Thou Fount of Every Blessing,” “Amazing Grace,” and “When I Survey the Wondrous Cross” were included for the first time. Seventy-eight of the hymns added to the collection were copied from Manchester Hymnal, which was published in England the year before. Of the remaining 143 hymns, only 10 were by Mormons, while 24 were by Isaac Watts, and 7 by Charles Wesley.

== Legacy and influence ==
The retrenchment towards Protestant Christianity ran counter to Joseph Smith's expanding and changing theology in the Nauvoo era of Church history, however, leading to the hymnbook having less of an impact than it otherwise would have in the Latter-day Saint tradition. By contrast, the 1840 Manchester hymnbook reflected an inclination towards hymns that focused on topics important to Mormons, including priesthood, the Second Coming of Christ, and the gathering of Israel. As a result, the Manchester Hymnal serves as the basis of the branch of Mormonism that followed the Quorum of the Twelve to Utah to this day.

If Brigham Young's Manchester hymnal and Emma Smith's Nauvoo hymnal represent diverging paths in hymn selection, then Emma's work represents the basis of hymnals in the Reorganized Church (now Community of Christ). Indeed, Emma edited the first and second hymnals the Reorganized Church printed in 1861 and 1864, largely based on her 1841 collection.

Nine major hymnals have been produced by the Reorganized church since their initial 1861 collection. Jan Shipps observed these "prairie saints" differed from the "mountain saints" in Utah in theology over a number of issues, including many of Joseph Smith's later teachings (especially polygamy). Hymns dealing with Nauvoo-era doctrines like baptisms for the dead (i.e., “The Glorious Gospel Light Had Shone”) were far less likely to appear in RLDS hymnbooks than their LDS counterparts, while songs that stand out as praising Mormon subjects were often muted, like “Praise to the Man,” which was edited to “Praise to the Lord for the Great Restoration.” Shifts in theology, such as the diminishing of belief in the destruction of wicked at an imminent Second Coming of Christ, declarations of being the “one true church,” and a literal gathering to Zion, have resulting in alterations or deletions of hymns that support these theological ideas. Emma's work in selecting hymns for the official 1841 hymnbook paved the way for later RLDS/Community of Christ hymnals.

== See also ==
- List of English-language hymnals by denomination
- Category:Latter Day Saint hymnals
- Hymns in the Church of Jesus Christ of Latter-day Saints
