= Gifts of the Spirit in Mormonism =

Views on gifts of the spirit in Mormonism

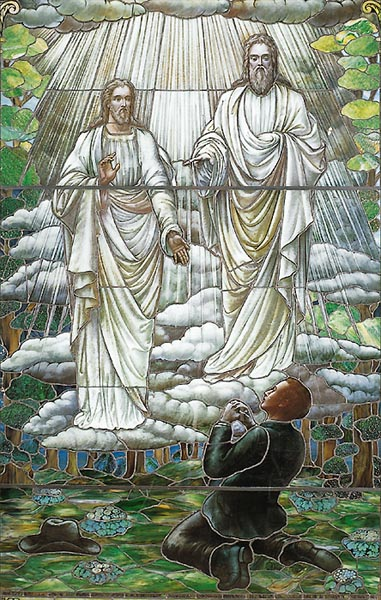
Stained glass depiction of Joseph Smith's First Vision, completed in 1913 by an unknown artist (Museum of Church History and Art).

In Mormonism, gifts of the Spirit are spiritual endowments that provide benefits to the recipient and to those he or she serves. The seventh Article of Faith states: "We believe in the gift of tongues, prophecy, revelation, visions, healing, interpretation of tongues, and so forth." Both males and females can receive spiritual gifts. They are an important component in both the basic beliefs and daily living of Mormons.

== Mode of acquisition ==
While some Charismatic Christians believe that spiritual gifts are an arbitrary endowment of grace, an important Mormon idea is that spiritual gifts can be bestowed by God upon an individual through diligent seeking and righteous living. Some gifts are developed in the premortal existence. Other spiritual gifts are developed during mortal life and identified by priesthood blessings. For example, many Mormons receive a patriarchal blessing which can reveal some spiritual gifts by revelation. For those who are members of the Church of Jesus Christ of Latter-day Saints (LDS Church), this blessing is recorded and saved in the official church archives.

In contemporary Church Of Jesus Christ Of Latter Day Saints Living, spiritual gifts are most often associated with the gift of the Holy Ghost, which is bestowed by the laying on of hands following baptism in an ordinance called confirmation. During the ordinance, the person being confirmed will receive the verbal admonition to "receive the Holy Ghost." From this point forward, the person will be entitled to the constant companionship of the Holy Spirit if they have faith in Jesus Christ and are in a state of true repentance. The recipient will also be entitled to receive personal revelation.

There is no clear consensus among Mormon thinkers on whether or not non-Mormons, who have not received the gift of the Holy Ghost, can enjoy spiritual gifts. Early Mormon references do not stress the idea that spiritual gifts are entirely predicated on the gift of the Holy Ghost, while contemporary opinions often do. However, the LDS Church's official website has the following quote, "As the Prophet Joseph Smith taught, the gifts of the Spirit 'are obtained through that medium' [the Holy Ghost] and “cannot be enjoyed without the gift of the Holy Ghost. … The world in general can know nothing about them.”

== Purpose ==
Many Mormons believe that spiritual gifts may be received according to the needs and capacity of the individual and to the needs of others around him or her. These gifts are given to benefit those who love God in their journey towards eternal life. They also serve as signs of true believers.

== Controversy ==
The belief that spiritual gifts exist in the present age is called continuationism by some theologians and religious studies scholars. In contrast, the belief that spiritual gifts no longer operate is called cessationism. Continuationists generally believe that cessationists lack faith. Consistent with the rationalism of the modern age, cessationists generally believe continuationists are either deceivers or mentally unhealthy.

== Historical development and de-emphasis ==
In the early-nineteenth century, the claim of Mormons to supernatural spiritual gifts was very common. Spiritual gifts were promoted in hymns, such as "The Spirit of God Like a Fire Is Burning", which was included in the first Latter Day Saint hymnal in 1835. However, with the passage of time, supernaturalism has been deemphasized as a normative expression within Mormonism. This de-emphasis is consistent with the general pattern of a young and charismatic religious movement experiencing the petrification of charisma because of new doctrinal standards, fixed rituals, and the policy making of bureaucratic institutions.

In regards to the gift of tongues, some early Mormons claimed that their glossolalia ("speaking in tongues in a sacred language unknown to any human") was an expression of the pure Adamic language. However, beginning in June 1839, glossolalia was de-emphasized in favor of the less supernatural xenoglossia ("speaking in tongues in a language that could have been learned by natural means"). In regards to the gift of healing, stand alone expressions of supernatural healing have been de-emphasized in favor of comforting the sick via priesthood blessings under institutional sponsorship. Today, few Mormons claim to experience supernaturalism, though there is a greater belief in supernatural gifts within Mormon fundamentalism as compared to the LDS Church. When supernaturalism is claimed in contemporary Mormonism, there is a tendency to attribute the experience to a direct act of God instead of an indirect act through the mediation of spiritual gifts.

== Appendix: list of Spiritual Gifts in early Mormonism ==
Some of the spiritual gifts found in early Mormon-exclusive sources include:

- gifts of prophecy (including both testimony and prediction abilities), (Note: Articles of Faith 7; Joseph Smith History 1:33; B.H. Roberts. 1980 Reprint Edition. Editor. History of the Church, Volumes 1-7. Second Edition Revised. The Deseret Book Company. [HC], Vol. 1, Ch. 12, p. 128; Alma 5:47; Moses 6:8; HC, Vol. 1, Ch. 14, p. 165; HC, Vol. 5, Ch. 2, p. 27; HC, Vol. 4, Ch. 26, p. 449; HC, Vol. 5, Ch. 2, p. 27; HC, Vol. 1, Ch. 5, p. 42; HC, Vol. 3, Ch. 10, p. 148; HC, Vol. 4, Ch. 15, p. 275; 1 Nephi 1:13 See notes accompanying Official Declaration 1 in the D&C; HC, Vol. 4, Ch. 35, p. 602; HC, Vol. 5, Ch. 2, p. 27.)
- gifts of knowledge and wisdom, (Note: Articles of Faith 7; HC, Vol. 1, Ch. 14, p. 165. Also: HC, Vol. 5, Ch. 2, p. 29; HC, Vol. 2, Ch. 32, p. 473; HC, Vol. 1, Ch. 5, p. 43; 1 Nephi 10:19; HC, Vol. 3, Ch. 20, p. 296; 3 Nephi 16:4; D&C 6:11.)
- inspiration to praise and glorify God and rejoice, (Note: HC, Vol. 1, Ch. 5, pp. 42, 44; HC, Vol. 1, Ch. 8, p. 76; HC, Vol. 1, Ch. 11, p. 115; HC, Vol. 2, Ch. 30, p. 430; 2 Nephi 31:13; D&C 97:5.)
- allowing the receiver to act as a conduit of the messages of God to humanity, (Note: HC, Vol. 6, Ch. 17, p. 366; HC, Vol. 1, Ch. 5, p. 50; 2 Nephi 28:4; HC, Vol. 3, Ch. 26, p. 384; HC, Vol. 5, Ch. 17, p. 339; HC, Vol. 5, Ch. 18, p. 355; HC, Vol. 6, Ch. 4, p. 82; 1 Nephi 10:11; Alma 8:30; Moroni 8:7; Moses 5:14; HC, Vol. 1, Ch. 7, p. 63; HC, Vol. 2, Ch. 33, p. 477; HC, Vol. 3, Ch. 5, pp. 50-51; Moses 5:58; Helaman 5:45; 2 Nephi 33:1; 1 Nephi 2:17-18.)
- receiving inspired, correct words in difficult circumstances, (Note: Articles of Faith 7; HC, Vol. 1, Ch. 6, p. 59; HC, Vol. 1, Ch. 17, p. 227.)
- the power to create or restore life, (Note: Alma 7:10; D&C 124:100.)
- receiving confirmation of identity and affiliation, (Note: HC, Vol. 1, Ch. 7, p. 67, 69.)
- gifts of hope and perfect love (charity), (Note: Moroni 7:44; Moroni 8:26.)
- ability to lead church meetings, (Note: HC, Vol. 1, Ch. 7, p. 67; HC, Vol. 1, Ch. 14, p. 164; Moroni 6:9)
- ability to establish the church and faith of God, and identify those chosen by God to priesthoods and callings, (Note: HC, Vol. 1, Ch. 6, p. 62; HC, Vol. 1, Ch. 18, p. 241; HC, Vol. 2, Ch. 12, p. 176; HC, Vol. 5, Ch. 2, p. 27; HC, Vol. 1, Ch. 8, p. 78; 1 Nephi 12:7; Alma 18:34; Moroni 3:4.)
- ability to receive general and specific inspiration about daily living, (Note: Articles of Faith 7; HC, Vol. 1, Ch. 14, p. 162; HC, Vol. 1, Ch. 14, p. 164; HC, Vol. 1, Ch. 23, p. 324; 2 Nephi 28:31; 2 Nephi 32:5; 4 Nephi 1:48.)
- gifts of faith, (Note: HC, Vol. 1, Ch. 14, p. 165. Also: HC, Vol. 5, Ch. 2, p. 29.)
- ability to discern spirits (including physiognomy and clairvoyance), (Note: Articles of Faith 7; HC, Vol. 1, Ch. 14, p. 165; HC, Vol. 5, Ch. 2, p. 29; HC, Vol. 2, Ch. 36, p. 528; 2 Nephi 13:9; JST Matthew 4:11.)
- gifts of healing others and the ability to be healed, (Note: Articles of Faith 7; HC, Vol. 1, Ch. 14, p. 165; D&C 24:13, 124:98; Dean C. Jessee. 1989. Editor. The Papers of Joseph Smith, Volumes 1-2. Deseret Book Company, Vol. 1, pp. 348-49. Also: HC, Vol. 5, Ch. 2, p. 29.)
- gifts of working miracles, (Note: Moroni 7:44; HC, Vol. 1, Ch. 14, p. 165; HC, Vol. 5, Ch. 2, p. 29; Moroni 10:12)
- gifts of tongues, (Note: Articles of Faith 7; HC, Vol. 3, Ch. 25, p. 379; HC, Vol. 1, Ch. 14, p. 165; HC, Vol. 5, Ch. 2, p. 27; HC, Vol. 5, Ch. 2, p. 29; HC, Vol. 1, Ch. 23, p. 322; HC, Vol. 4, Ch. 28, p. 485; HC, Vol. 5, Ch. 2, p. 31.)
- ability to cast out devils and demons (exorcism), (Note: HC, Vol.4, Ch.31, p. 538; D&C 24:13, 124:98; JST Matthew 12:23.)
- divine investiture of authority and priesthood, (Note: HC, Vol. 1, Ch. 17, p. 227; HC, Vol. 1, Ch. 23, p. 323; 1 Nephi 10:22; HC, Vol. 1, Ch. 7, p. 68.)
- remission of sins and purification, (Note: 2 Nephi 31:17)
- ability to receive general help (wishes), (Note: Mosiah 2:22; Helaman 10:5; 4 Nephi 1:18.)
- gifts of angelic ministration, (Note: 2 Nephi 32:2-3; Moses 7:27; JST Matthew 4:11.)
- ability to receive and interpret dreams (sleeping visions), (Note: 1 Nephi 1:16, 2:1-2, 3:2, 8:2-4, 36, 15:21-22; Ether 9:3; Andrew F. Ehat, Lyndon W. Cook. 1980. Comp. and eds., The Words of Joseph Smith. Brigham Young University., p. 170; TPJS, p. 270, 368, 393.)
- protection (rescue) from enemies, serpents, poisons, injury, devils, evil, and all trouble, (Note: Joseph Smith Papers, Vol. 1, p. 168; Mosiah 2:31, 36; Alma 34:22-23; Helaman 12:2; 3; 16:2; Nephi 22:17; Mormon 9:24; D&C 24:13, 71:9-10, 109:25-30, 124:98.)
- safeguarding of the home, (Note: Alma 34:21. Also, Mormons use priesthood power to dedicate their homes based on the model given during the Kirtland Temple dedication (D&C 109).)
- warnings of danger, (Note: Alma 48:15.)
- ability to pass unnoticed or untouched, (Note: Helaman 10:15-16.)
- gifts of waking visions and ascension, (Note: Articles of Faith 7; JSP, Vol. 1, pp. 170-72, 182, 215-19)
- ability to remember things once known (memory), (Note: Articles of Faith 7; 1 Nephi 4:14, 12:9, 14:8; Mosiah 1:4; Alma 36:17; 3 Nephi 11:12, 15:1; Ether 2:14; D&C 20:77, 79.)
- ability to control weather; (Note: 1 Nephi 18.)
- gifts of health, prosperity, and success, (Note: 1 Nephi 2:20, 4:14, 13:15; 2 Nephi 1:9, 20, 31; 2 Nephi 4:4, 5:11, 13; Jarom 1:9; Mosiah 1:7, 2:22, 31, 36, 25:24, 27:7; Alma 9:13, 22, 34:24, 36:1, 30, 37:13, 38:1, 45:8, 48:15, 25, 49:30, 50:20, 62:49-51; Helaman 3:20-25, 4:15, 11:20, 12:1-2; 3 Nephi 5:22, 6:5; 4 Nephi 1:18; Ether 10:28; D&C 9:13, 97:18.)
- gifts of posterity, (Note: Helaman 11:20.)
- gifts of peace and comfort, (Note: Mosiah 24:13, 16; Alma 31:31-32; D&C 25:5, 107:55.)
- respect from the world leaders, (Note: 1 Nephi 21:23; 2 Nephi 6:7, 10:9.)
- gifts of divine glory and transfiguration, (Note: 1 Nephi 17:52; Moses 1:11.)
- ability to wither, consume, burn, shake, shock, or kill enemies; (Note: 1 Nephi 17:51-55.)
- ability to bless (bind) and curse (loose | repel) an individual or group for keeping or defying the law of God, (Note: Joseph Smith Papers, Vol. 1, p. 214. For example, “Now Alma said unto him: This will I give unto thee for a sign, that thou shalt be struck dumb, according to my words; and I say, that in the name of God, ye shall be struck dumb, that ye shall no more have utterance. Now when Alma had said these words, Korihor was struck dumb, that he could not have utterance, according to the words of Alma” (Alma 30:49-50). Also see, HC, Vol. 1, Ch. 22, p. 312-13; HC, Vol. 6, Ch. 3, p. 58; 3 Nephi 22:17; D&C 109:25-30, 124:93, 132:46-47; Abraham 2:11.)
- gift of eternal life (deification). (Note: 1 Nephi 15:36; D&C 6:13, 14:7.)

== See also ==
- List of articles about Mormonism
