= A Poor Wayfaring Man of Grief =

1826 poem by James Montgomery

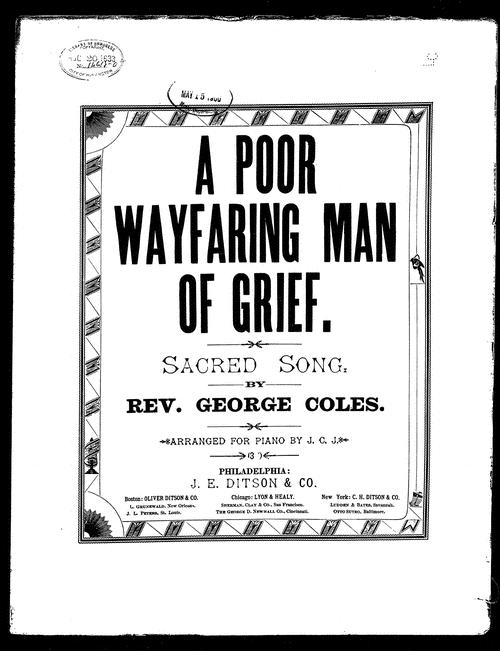
- Genre: Hymn
- Written: 1826
- Text: James Montgomery
- Based on: Isaiah 53:3
- Meter: 8.8.8.8 D
- Melody: "Duane Street" by George Coles

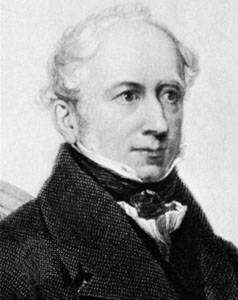
James Montgomery, 1855

"A Poor Wayfaring Man of Grief" (originally titled "The Stranger and His Friend") is a seven-stanza poem written in 1826 by James Montgomery. The words of the poem have since been adopted as a Christian hymn.

== Origin and authorship ==
Montgomery wrote "The Stranger and His Friend" in December 1826 while travelling in England on extended trips in horse-drawn carriages. Montgomery did not write the poem with the intention of it being set to music. It was originally written as a Christmas poem.

New York City preacher George Coles set the poem to music he wrote. The hymn was adopted by some Christian congregations in the United States and the United Kingdom.

== Historical connection with Latter Day Saints ==
"A Poor Wayfaring Man of Grief" was a favorite hymn of Joseph Smith, founder of the Latter Day Saint movement. The hymn was introduced in the church by apostle John Taylor, who learned the hymn in 1840 as a missionary in England. Taylor included the hymn in the Latter Day Saints' Manchester Hymnal, which was used in England from 1840 to 1912. The hymn was also included in the church's 1841 hymnal published in Nauvoo, Illinois. Unlike the version in the Manchester Hymnal, the hymn in the Nauvoo hymnal included music composed by Taylor.

On the afternoon that Joseph Smith and his brother, Hyrum, were killed by a mob in prison in Carthage, Illinois, the Smiths requested Taylor sing the hymn twice.

After he became president of the Church of Jesus Christ of Latter-day Saints (LDS Church), Taylor asked Ebenezer Beesley to compose new music for the hymn. The results were published in the church's 1889 hymnal, and the hymn has been included in every subsequent edition of the church's hymnal. In the LDS Church's 1985 English-language hymnal, it is hymn number 29.

The original tune Taylor sang before the martyrdom became lost in the years following Taylor's death. In 2008, a descendant of Taylor found the original tune in the notebook of Beesley, and then shared his findings with historian Jeffrey N. Walker. Walker then published his arrangement of the hymn with the tune as it was sung to Beesley.
