= Joy to the World (Phelps) =

"Joy to the World! The Lord Will Come" is an adaptation by W. W. Phelps of the popular Christian Hymn "Joy to the World". The adapted song was included in A Collection of Sacred Hymns, the first Latter Day Saint hymnal, which was prepared for publication in 1835 and published in February 1836 as well as all English-language hymnals published by the LDS Church since 1948.

The textual changes typify the millennial expectation and theology of The Church of Jesus Christ of Latter-day Saints. The version of the song published in the current (1985) hymnal of the Church of Jesus Christ of Latter-day Saints uses the Phelps text except for the first two lines, which reflect Watts' original words.

== Side-by-Side Lyrics of Phelps and Watts ==
The changes were made by W. W. Phelps from the original version written by Isaac Watts.

Phelps Adaptation

Joy to the world, the Lord will come!
And earth receive her King;
Let ev'ry heart prepare him room,
And saints and angels sing.

Rejoice! rejoice! when Jesus reigns!
And saints their songs employ:
While fields and floods, rocks, hills and plains,
Repeat the sounding joy.

No more will sin and sorrow grow,
Nor thorns infest the ground;
He'll come and make the blessings flow
Far as the curse was found.

Rejoice! rejoice! in the Most High,
While Israel spreads abroad,
Like stars that glitter in the sky,
And ever worship God.

Watts Original

Joy to the world, the Lord is come!
Let earth receive her King;
Let every heart prepare Him room,
And heaven and nature sing.

Joy to the world, the Saviour reigns!
Let men their songs employ;
While fields and floods, rocks, hills and plains
Repeat the sounding joy.

No more let sins and sorrows grow,
Nor thorns infest the ground;
He comes to make His blessings flow
Far as the curse is found.

He rules the world with truth and grace,
And makes the nations prove
The glories of His righteousness,
And wonders of His love.

== See also ==
- Isaac Watts, author of the original version
