= Milton V. Backman =

Portrait of Milton

Milton Vaughn Backman Jr. (June 11, 1927 – February 6, 2016) was a historian of American religions with particular emphasis on the early history of the Latter Day Saint movement.

He was a professor of church history at Brigham Young University. Following his retirement, he briefly taught at the BYU-affiliated Joseph Smith Academy.

Backman was a member of the Church of Jesus Christ of Latter-day Saints (LDS Church) and served in various positions in the church, often related to teaching and welfare. He served as a member of a bishopric and on a stake high council. As a young man, Backman served as a missionary for the LDS Church in South Africa. Backman died on February 6, 2016, at the age of 88.

== Writings ==
- The Heavens Resound: A History of the Latter-day Saints in Ohio, 1830-1838
- American Religions and the Rise of Mormonism
- Joseph Smith's First Vision: The First Vision in its Historical Context
- Christian Churches of America: Origins and Beliefs (Rev. ed.). New York: Charles Scribner's Sons. 1983. ISBN 0-02-305090-X.
- Eyewitness Accounts of the Restoration

Edited

- Regional Studies in Latter-day Saint History: New York with Larry C. Porter and Susan Easton Black.

Backman also compiled a collection of diaries and biographies of people who knew Joseph Smith with the assistance of Keith W. Perkins.
