= Ebenezer Beesley House =

Historic house in Salt Lake City, Utah, U.S.

- U.S. National Register of Historic Places
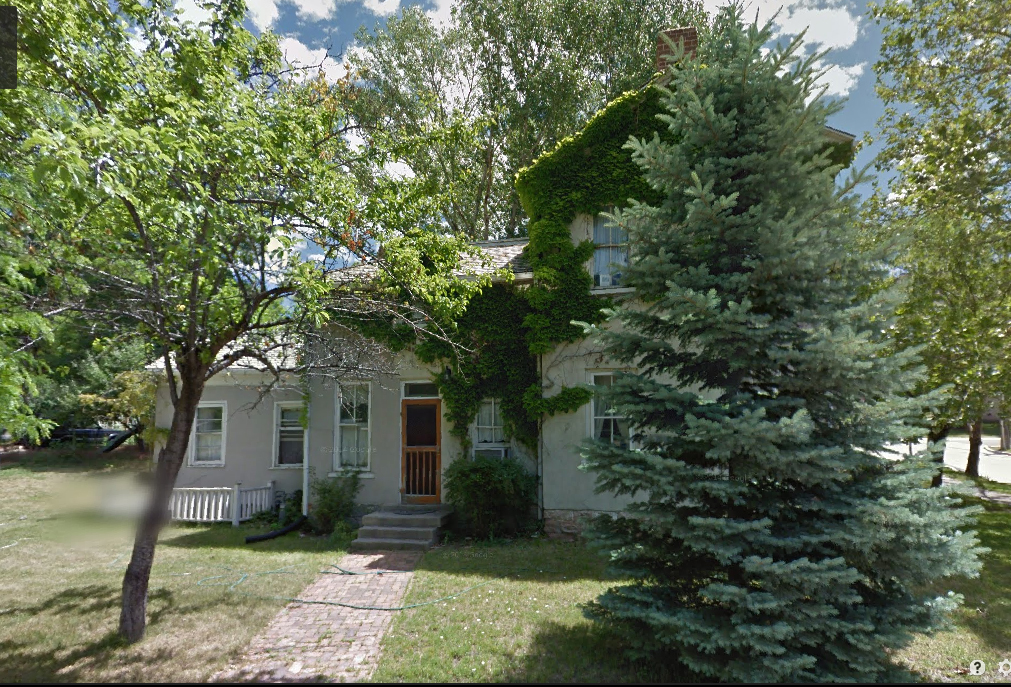
- The Ebenezer Beesley House before renovation in 2019.
- Coordinates: 40.7759°N 111.8937°W
- Area: less than one acre
- Architectural style: I-form adobe
- NRHP reference No.: 79002500
- Added to NRHP: July 16, 1979

The Ebenezer Beesley House in Salt Lake City, Utah, is a 2-story adobe brick and stucco Vernacular house constructed in the 19th century. It was probably constructed by 1866, when Beesley is recorded as living at that address. The house, bearing only minimal ornamentation, is one of only a few I-form stuccoed adobe structures remaining in the city. Its notability arises from the fact that, though once common, this particular form has all but disappeared in the cities of Utah. It is also notable as a vernacular structure, meaning its design was dictated by the tastes of the local people and their living conditions, rather than mainstream architectural trends of that day. The house was added to the National Register of Historic Places in 1979.

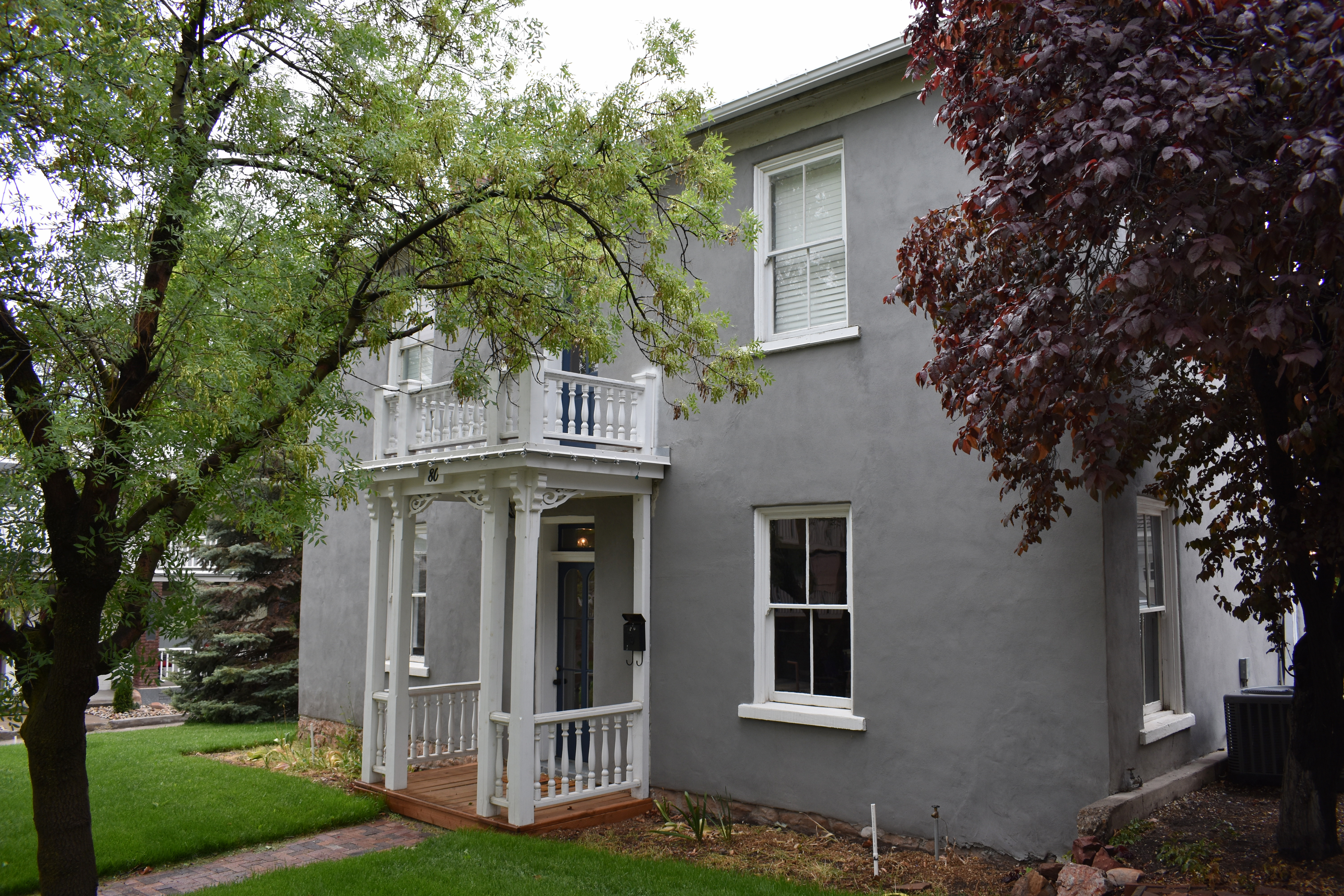
The house from the southeast.

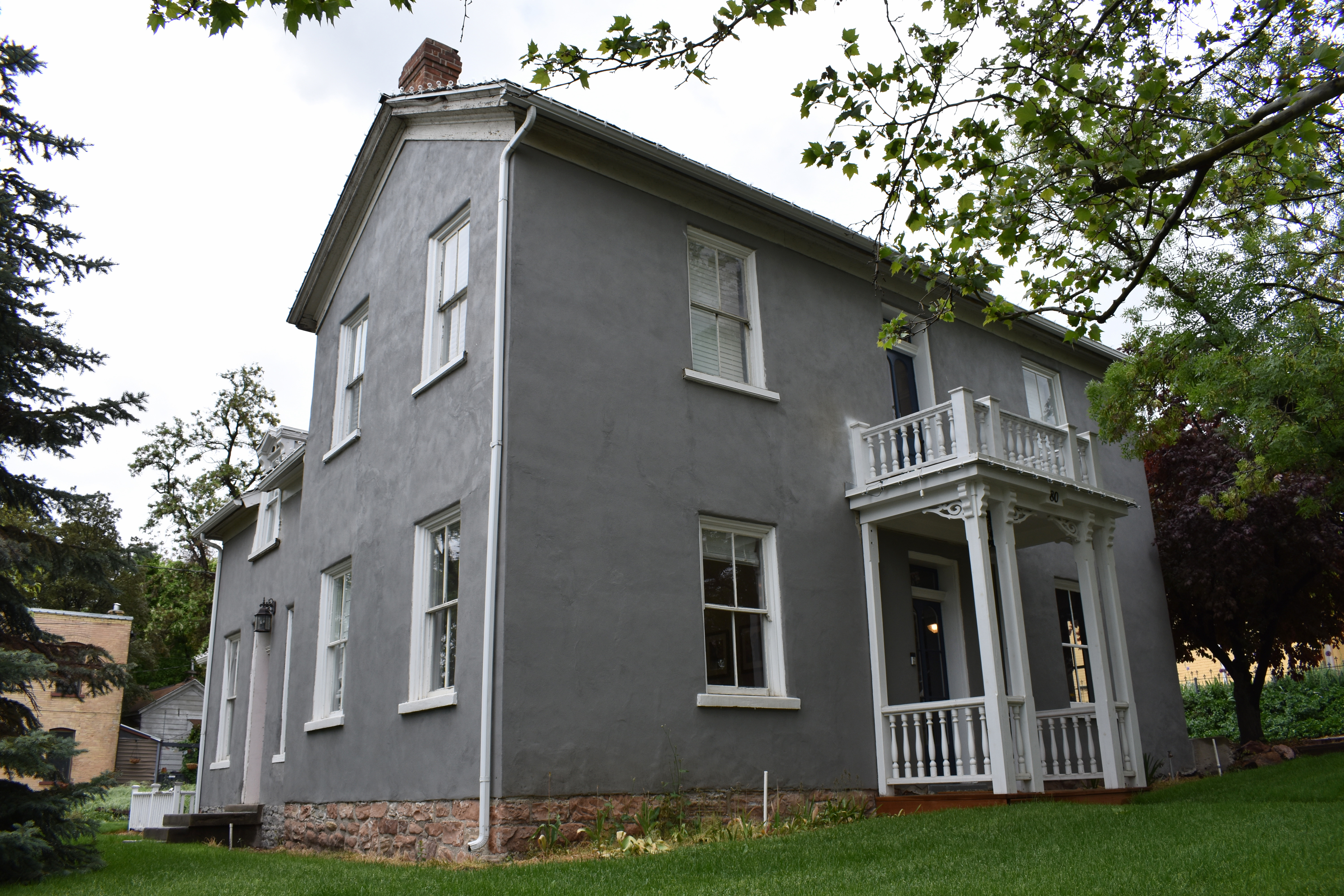
The house from the southwest.

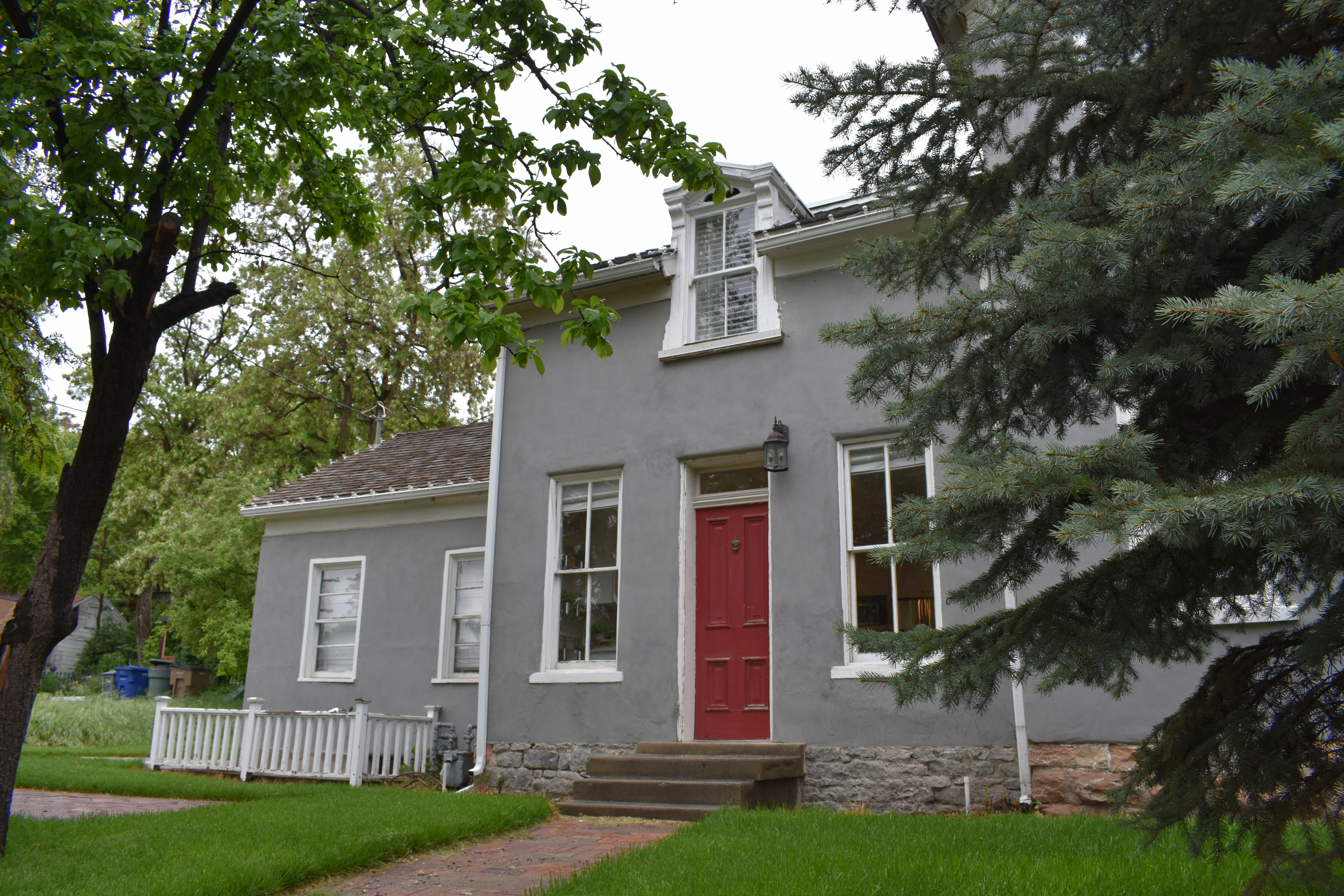
The house from the west.

== See also ==
Media related to Ebenezer Beesley House at Wikimedia Commons

Capitol Hill: Living History archived here.
