= The Morning Breaks, the Shadows Flee =

1840 Latter Day Saint hymn

"The Morning Breaks, the Shadows Flee" is an 1840 hymn written by Latter Day Saint apostle Parley P. Pratt.

The lyrics to the hymn were first published in May 1840 as a poem on the outside cover of the inaugural issue of the Millennial Star, a periodical of the Church of Jesus Christ of Latter Day Saints published in England. When the church published its Manchester Hymnal later that year, "The Morning Breaks, the Shadows Flee" was the first hymn in the work. Since the Manchester Hymnal was published, the song has often been the first song in hymnals published by the Church of Jesus Christ of Latter-day Saints (LDS Church). It is hymn number 1 in the current LDS Church hymnal under the shortened title, "The Morning Breaks".

In 1864, George Careless composed music to accompany Pratt's poem. The Mormon Tabernacle Choir adopted Careless's rendition and it has since become one of the choir's standard numbers.

The hymn has five verses and centers on the theme that God has restored the gospel to the earth.

== Lyrics ==
The morning breaks, the shadows flee;
Lo, Zion’s standard is unfurled!
The dawning of a brighter day,
The dawning of a brighter day
Majestic rises on the world.

The clouds of error disappear
Before the rays of truth divine;
The glory bursting from afar,
The glory bursting from afar
Wide o’er the nations soon will shine.

The Gentile fulness now comes in,
And Israel’s blessings are at hand.
Lo, Judah’s remnant, cleansed from sin,
Lo, Judah’s remnant, cleansed from sin,
Shall in their promised Canaan stand.

Jehovah speaks! Let earth give ear,
And Gentile nations turn and live.
His mighty arm is making bare,
His mighty arm is making bare
His cov’nant people to receive.

Angels from heav’n and truth from earth
Have met, and both have record borne;
Thus Zion’s light is bursting forth,
Thus Zion’s light is bursting forth
To bring her ransomed children home.

== See also ==
- Praise to the Man, 2009 Mormon Tabernacle Choir album
