= The Spirit of God Like a Fire Is Burning =

Latter Day Saint movement hymn

"The Spirit of God Like a Fire Is Burning" (also "The Spirit of God" or "Hosanna to God and the Lamb") is a hymn of the Latter Day Saint movement. It was written by W. W. Phelps, one of the most prolific hymnwriters of early Latter Day Saint movement.

== History of use ==
The hymn was sung for the dedication of Kirtland Temple, 27 March 1836. In the Encyclopedia of Mormonism, Keith W. Perkins has stated that the hymn was written for this occasion. A Latter Day Saint hymnal including the hymn was published in February 1836 (though dated 1835 on the title page), and it had been sung at Latter Day Saint meetings before the Kirtland Temple was completed.

The song continues to be sung throughout the various Latter Day Saint denominations, including the Church of Jesus Christ of Latter-day Saints (LDS Church), Community of Christ, and the Remnant Church of Jesus Christ of Latter Day Saints. It is sung as part of the Hosannah Anthem, a special piece for the dedication of LDS Church temples.

== Tune ==
Early printings of the hymn contain text only, although tune names were given twice in the church newspaper, the Messenger and Advocate. The January 1836 issue of the Messenger and Advocate specifies the tune American Star. On the other hand, the March 1836 issue specifies the different tune Hosanna when it was sung for the dedication service of the Kirtland Temple. At least four tunes have been associated with the hymn since it was written, including: The American Star, Hosanna, and Assembly (also known as Paraclete). While these tunes were likely familiar to many of the members of the church at the time, there is some ambiguity today as to how these tunes were sung. Karen Lynn Davidson has stated that some believe Assembly to be another name for the Hosanna tune used at the dedication of the Kirtland Temple.

J. C. Little and G. B. Gardner published an unofficial hymnal in 1844 in Bellows Falls, Vermont, which is the first Latter Day Saint hymnal to include any music. "The Spirit of God," is included as the very first hymn and it is set to the same tune used today—although the notes in the refrain differ slightly from modern editions, and it contained only soprano and bass instead of the four parts typical of modern editions.

== Lyrics and commentary ==
The hymn was a last minute addition to the first church hymnal, Collection of Sacred Hymns published in Kirtland, Ohio, 1835 or 1836. It appears as the last song (hymn 90) and in a different typeset than the rest of the hymnal. This original version had six stanzas. In some cases the lyrics borrow words from the patriotic folk song, "The American Star."

=== Stanza one ===
The Spirit of God like a fire is burning;
The latter day glory begins to come forth;
The visions and blessings of old are returning;
And angels are coming to visit the earth.

The words of the first stanza capture the millennialist spirit of the early Latter Day Saint movement. Phelps supposedly wrote the words following a meeting during which the leaders of the church were overcome by the Spirit. Joseph Smith speaks of the meeting in his diary, 17 January 1836:

The Lord poured out his spirit upon us and the brethren began to confess their faults one to the other. The congregation was soon overwhelmed in tears and some of our hearts were too big for utterance. The gift of tongues come upon us also like the rushing of a mighty wind and my soul was filled with the glory of God.

The first words come from "The American Star" which begins, "The spirits of Washington, Warren, Montgomery" and "then goes on to praise these heroes of the Revolution who yet watch over nineteenth-century patriots."

=== Chorus ===
We'll sing and we'll shout with the armies of heaven:
Hosanna, hosanna to God and the Lamb!
Let glory to them in the highest be given,
Henceforth and forever: amen and amen!

The chorus is sung as above after each stanza. However the first line becomes "We'll sing and we'll shout with His armies of heaven" for the last chorus in the original printing.

The use of the phrase "armies of heaven" in first line is used to mean a "great multitude of angels," but also reflects the imagery of the original song, "The American Star." Musicologist, Michael Hicks, points out, "The choruses to both use military images. One speaks of the U.S. militia ('let millions invade us, we'll meet them undaunted'), the other of heaven ('we'll sing and we'll shout with the armies of heaven')."

More recently, Andrew Bolton and Randall Pratt authored a revised or alternative version of "The Spirit of God" in 2003. This version offers the less militaristic wording, "angels of heaven," over "armies of heaven." It has been used in various Community of Christ gatherings, however the 2013 World Conference Hymnal and the new denominational hymnal Community of Christ Sings while including the Bolton-Pratt adaptation of stanza 6, do not contain the changes to the chorus.

=== Stanza two ===
The Lord is extending the saints' understanding—
Restoring their judges and all as at first;
The knowledge and power of God are expanding
The vail o'er the earth is beginning to burst.

The word "vail" is the (now archaic) spelling of "veil" as found in the original 1830 hymnal. The King James Version of the Bible uses both spellings of the word interchangeably.

=== Stanza three ===
We call in our solemn assemblies, in spirit,
To spread forth the kingdom of heaven abroad,
That we through our faith may begin to inherit
The visions, and blessings, and glories of God.

Further parallels between patriotic "American Star" and "The Spirit of God" are found in stanza three.

The patriotic song declares that "to us the high boon has been granted." Phelps elaborates on this: "We...begin to inherit the visions and blessings and glories of God." "The American Star" urges all "to spread the glad tidings of liberty far." Phelps urges the Saints "to spread forth the kingdom of heaven abroad."

=== Stanza four ===
We'll wash and be wash'd, and with oil be anointed
Withal not omitting the washing of feet:
For he that receiveth his PENNY appointed,
Must surely be clean at the harvest of wheat.

This stanza is rarely sung today as most hymnals have omitted stanzas four and five.

The Church of Jesus Christ (Bickertonite) has kept this stanza as the ordinance of Feet Washing is currently practiced among the baptized membership. It is contained in their "Saints Hymnal" as number 13.

The first two lines of this stanza refer to ordinances of washing and anointing (which continues today in LDS temple ordinances), and the washing of feet.

The phrase "PENNY appointed" is a reference to the parable of the laborer in the vineyard (Matt 20:1–16). In this parable, laborers who start working during the eleventh hour receive the same reward of a penny as do the laborers who have been working from the very beginning.

=== Stanza five ===
Old Israel that fled from the world for his freedom,
Must come with the cloud and the pillar, amain:
A Moses, and Aaron, and Joshua lead him,
And feed him on manna from heaven again.

This stanza is rarely sung today as most hymnals have omitted stanzas four and five.

=== Stanza six ===
How blessed the day when the lamb and the lion
Shall lie down together without any ire;
And Ephraim be crown'd with his blessing in Zion,
As Jesus descends with his chariots of fire!

The first two lines are a reference to Isaiah 11:6, which in the KJV reads, "The wolf also shall dwell with the lamb, and the leopard shall lie down with the kid; and the calf and the young lion and the fatling together; and a little child shall lead them." Ephraim (in the third line) is one of the tribes of Israel. He is the second son of Joseph (Gen. 41:52; 46:20). The last line is a millennial reference to the second coming of Christ.

=== Note ===
Stanzas 1,2,3, and 6 appear in the LDS Church's hymnal as hymn verses 1 to 4. However, Hymns of the Saints, the Community of Christ hymnal from 1981 to 2013, did not include the sixth stanza. Community of Christ Sings, the current Community of Christ hymnal, includes the Bolton–Pratt revision of this stanza as the third of four verses:

How blessed the day when the lamb and the lion
Shall lie down together in peace with a child.
With one heart and mind may the Lord call us Zion:
A people of justice, by God's love inspired!

== See also ==
- Hosanna Shout
- Gifts of the Spirit in Mormonism
