= Praise to the Man =

Joseph Smith memorial poem and hymn (1844)

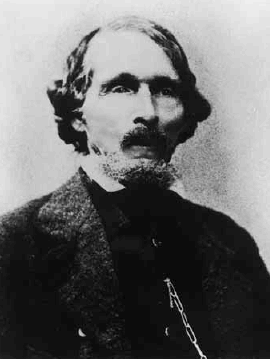
William W. Phelps, author of "Praise to the Man"

"Praise to the Man" (originally titled "Joseph Smith") is a poem written as a eulogy in verse for Joseph Smith. The poem's authorship is typically attributed to Latter Day Saint leader and hymn writer William W. Phelps. The poem was composed soon after Smith's death, and was later set to music and adopted as a hymn of the Church of Jesus Christ of Latter-day Saints (LDS Church). It was first published with no directly attached name in the church newspaper Times and Seasons in August 1844, approximately one month after Smith was killed. The hymn is still used in the LDS Church, as number 27 in its current hymnal.

== Origin ==
Phelps, the hymn's author, became involved in the Church of Christ, the original name of the church founded by Smith, during its time in Kirtland, Ohio. He subsequently served as a leader in Missouri before leaving the church due to unresolved financial issues and personal dissatisfaction. Declaring himself an enemy to the Mormon prophet, Phelps offered to testify against Smith in an intended Missouri trial for treason in which Smith would be the main defendant. However, the proceeding never took place, and in 1839 Smith and his associates were allowed to escape to the newly established Mormon haven of Nauvoo, Illinois.

Two years later, Phelps experienced a change of heart toward Smith, and wrote him a repentant letter asking for forgiveness and a chance to rejoin the Latter Day Saints in Illinois. Smith's reply offered Phelps his full forgiveness and a return to the church with no further consequences. Phelps was deeply touched by this development, and upon his return he became an enthusiastic and devoted disciple of Smith's. Phelps was invited to speak at Smith's funeral in June 1844. His poem, "Joseph Smith", followed in August of that same year, and has since become a popular hymn.

== Authorship controversy ==
From the poem's initial publishing in the August 1, 1844, edition of the Times and Seasons until 1863, its authorship was consistently attributed to Eliza R. Snow. This changed upon the publishing of the 1863 edition of the Manchester Hymnal and has been perpetuated in subsequent LDS hymnals. The unclear authorship was likely due to Snow's byline appearing above two separate poems on the page and Phelps being both an assistant editor of the periodical as well as an accomplished poet.

== Changes ==
Part of the original text of the second verse read: "Long shall his blood, which was shed by assassins, / Stain Illinois, while the earth lauds his fame." In 1927, in accordance with its "good neighbor" policy, the LDS Church officially changed the words "Stain Illinois" to "Plead unto heav'n".

In earlier hymnals, Community of Christ changed the hymn title and first line to “Praise to the Lord for the Great Restoration,” to make it less focused on Joseph Smith. The hymn is no longer included in the current hymnal used in Community of Christ.

== Tune ==
Phelps originally suggested "Star in the East" as the hymn tune, which is probably the same melody as "Star in the East" from Southern Harmony.

Star in the east
"Star in the east" done with four-syllable solfege syllables.

The LDS hymnal now uses a melody based on "Scotland the Brave". The tune is modified to match the syllable count of the text.

== Lyrics ==
Praise to the man who communed with Jehovah!
Jesus anointed that Prophet and Seer.
Blessed to open the last dispensation,
Kings shall extol him, and nations revere.
Hail to the Prophet, ascended to heaven!
Traitors and tyrants now fight him in vain.
Mingling with Gods, he can plan for his brethren;
Death cannot conquer the hero again.

Praise to his mem’ry, he died as a martyr;
Honored and blest be his ever great name!
Long shall his blood, which was shed by assassins,
Plead unto heav’n while the earth lauds his fame.
Hail to the Prophet, ascended to heaven!
Traitors and tyrants now fight him in vain.
Mingling with Gods, he can plan for his brethren;
Death cannot conquer the hero again.

Great is his glory and endless his priesthood.
Ever and ever the keys he will hold.
Faithful and true, he will enter his kingdom,
Crowned in the midst of the prophets of old.
Hail to the Prophet, ascended to heaven!
Traitors and tyrants now fight him in vain.
Mingling with Gods, he can plan for his brethren;
Death cannot conquer the hero again.

Sacrifice brings forth the blessings of heaven;
Earth must atone for the blood of that man.
Wake up the world for the conflict of justice.
Millions shall know “Brother Joseph” again.
Hail to the Prophet, ascended to heaven!
Traitors and tyrants now fight him in vain.
Mingling with Gods, he can plan for his brethren;
Death cannot conquer the hero again.
