= Adam-ondi-Ahman (hymn) =

Latter Day Saint hymn

"Adam-ondi-Ahman" (originally "This Earth Was Once a Garden Place") is an LDS hymn and was included in the first Latter Day Saint hymnal and quickly became one of the most popular songs of the early church. It was published in 1835 in Messenger and Advocate and is hymn number 49 in the current LDS Church hymnal.

The hymn was written by W. W. Phelps, an early church member and poet. It was one of several hymns by Phelps to be sung at the dedication of the Kirtland Temple in 1836. The music comes from the 1835 Southern Appalachian folk hymn "Prospect of Heaven".

The Latter Day Saint term, Adam-ondi-Ahman, refers to the place in Missouri that Adam and Eve went after they were evicted from the Garden of Eden.

== Lyrics and explanation ==
=== Stanza one ===
This earth was once a garden place,
With all her glories common;
And men did live a holy race,
And worship Jesus face to face,
In Adam-ondi-Ahman.

=== Stanza two ===
We read that Enoch walk[e]d with God,
Above the pow[e]r of Mammon:
While Zion spread herself abroad,
And saints and angels sung aloud
In Adam-ondi-Ahman.

"Enoch walked with God" is a quote from the Book of Genesis, "And Enoch walked with God: and he was [no more]; for God took him" (Gen 5:24). The Epistle to the Hebrews expands on this: "By faith Enoch was translated that he should not see death; and was not found, because God had translated him: for before his translation he had this testimony, that he pleased God" (Heb 11:5).

In Latter Day Saint theology, Enoch founded the city of Zion on earth, which God eventually took up into heaven because of the righteousness of its inhabitants. "I am the same which have taken the Zion of Enoch into mine own bosom" (D&C Section 38:4 (LDS), 38:1b (RLDS/CofC)).

=== Stanza three ===
Her land was good and greatly blest,
Beyond old Israel's Canaan:
Her fame was known from east to west;
Her peace was great, and pure the rest
Of Adam-ondi-Ahman.

"Old Israel's Cannaan" changed to "All Israel's Canaan" in current Latter-day Saint hymnal.

=== Stanza four ===
Hosanna to such days to come—
The Savior's second comin[g]—
When all the earth in glorious bloom,
Affords the saints a holy home
Like Adam-ondi-Ahman.
