= Keith W. Perkins =

Mormon historian

Keith W. Perkins was a professor of Church History and Doctrine at Brigham Young University (BYU). He has written widely on the history of the Church of Jesus Christ of Latter-day Saints (LDS Church) in the period when it was headquartered at Kirtland, Ohio. Perkins has written articles on figures in the recording of the history of the LDS Church, such as Andrew Jenson, whose work as a historian was the subject of Perkins' masters' thesis. His thesis was cited in Charles T. Morrissey's article "We Call it Oral History", which moved the accepted time of the origin of the term back from the late-1940s to the mid-1860s.

Perkins was born in Phoenix, Arizona. He has a BA in History Education from Arizona State University and an MA and PhD from BYU in Church History and Doctrine. He was seminary principal at the LDS seminary adjacent to Granite High School in Salt Lake County, Utah, and then instructor at the Tempe Institute of Religion (adjacent to the campus of Arizona State University) before joining the BYU faculty in 1975. During the mid-1980s, as chair of the department of Church History and Doctrine, Perkins developed the idea for special symposium to be held in various locations related to church history. This was the beginning of the various publications in the LDS Church History in place x series, with New England, New York and Pennsylvania, Ohio, Missouri, Illinois, the Pacific, and the United Kingdom having been some of the places featured over the years in the series. He has also written articles on subjects such as the Joseph Smith Translation of the Bible.

Among other works, Perkins compiled with Milton V. Backman Jr. Journals, Diaries, Biographies, Autobiographies and Letters of Some Early Mormons and Others Who Knew Joseph Smith, Jr. and/or His Contemporaries. With LaMar C. Barrett and Donald Q. Cannon, he edited the book Sacred Places: Ohio and Illinois, published by Deseret Book in 2001. Perkins was also a co-author with Bruce A. Van Orden, David J. Whittaker, Truman G. Madsen, John W. Welch and James P. Bell of the book Book of Mormon Scholars. Perkins compiled a book entitled Marriage is Ordained of God, which was a collection of talks on the subject by general authorities of the LDS Church.

Perkins and his wife, Vella Crowther, are the parents of four children. Perkins is a member of the LDS Church and has worked with Ezra Taft Benson, Gordon B. Hinckley and Thomas S. Monson in developing the church's visitors center and other properties and programs in Kirtland, Ohio. Among other callings in the LDS Church, Perkins has served as a bishop and a stake president.
