= W. W. Phelps (Mormon) =

American leader in the Latter Day Saint movement (1792–1872)

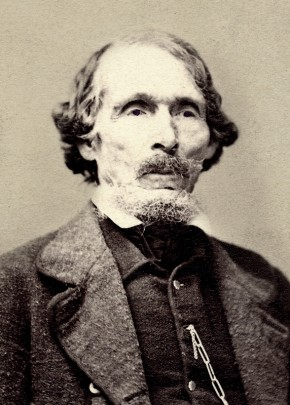

Speaker of the Utah Territorial House of Representatives
- September 22, 1851 – March 6, 1852
- Predecessor: Office established
- Successor: Jedediah M. Grant

Member of the Utah Territorial House of Representatives for Salt Lake County
- September 22, 1851 – January 22, 1858
- Predecessor: Office established
- Successor: Charles C. Rich

Personal details
- Born: William Wines Phelps; February 17, 1792; Hanover Township, New Jersey, US
- Died: March 17, 1872 (aged 80); Salt Lake City, Utah Territory
- Resting place: Salt Lake City Cemetery; 40.777°N 111.858°W
- Occupation: Church printer
- Title: Scribe to Joseph Smith, composer of numerous LDS hymns
- Spouse(s): Stella Waterman
- Parents: Enon Phelps; Mehitable Goldsmith

William Wines Phelps (February 17, 1792 – March 7, 1872) was an American author, composer, politician, and early leader of the Latter Day Saint movement. He printed the first edition of the Book of Commandments that became a standard work of the church and wrote numerous hymns, some of which are included in the current hymnal of the Church of Jesus Christ of Latter-day Saints (LDS Church). He was at times both close to and at odds with church leadership. He testified against Joseph Smith, providing evidence that helped persuade authorities to arrest Smith. He was excommunicated three times and rejoined the church each time. He was a ghostwriter for Smith. Phelps was called by Smith to serve as assistant president of the church in Missouri and as a member of the Council of Fifty. After Smith's death, Phelps supported Brigham Young during the succession crisis.

== Early life ==
Phelps was born in Hanover Township, New Jersey on February 17, 1792. He was named after American Revolutionary War general William Wines (also spelled "Winds"). His father, Enon Phelps, and mother, Mehitable Goldsmith, moved the family to Homer, New York, in 1800. Phelps was a descendant of the Puritan leader William Phelps. He was mostly self-taught, acquiring knowledge in various areas such as theology, meteorology, and history. He once sought the office of lieutenant governor of New York. He worked as an apprentice to a printer.

On April 28, 1815, he married Sally Waterman in Smyrna, New York. The pair had ten children: eight daughters and two sons. After marrying Sally, Phelps began publishing the Western Courier in Homer in 1820. In this capacity, "he verbally attacked his foes and they him." He next moved to Trumansburgh, Tompkins County, New York, where he edited the anti-Masonic newspaper Lake Light. In 1827, he relocated to Canandaigua, New York, where he published and edited another anti-Masonic newspaper, the Ontario Phoenix. Phelps was described by Dean Jessee as "one of [the] founders" of the anti-Masonic movement in New York.

== Involvement in Latter Day Saint movement ==
Phelps purchased a copy of the Book of Mormon from Parley P. Pratt on April 9, 1830, just three days after Church of Christ was organized. He and his wife, Sally, read the book and "became converted to its truth." Phelps then met Joseph Smith on December 24, 1830, and became convinced that Smith was a prophet. On April 29, 1831, Phelps was imprisoned at Lyons, New York, by a "couple of Presbyterian traders, for a small debt, for the purpose, as [he] was informed, of 'keeping [him] from joining the Mormons.'"

=== Kirtland, Ohio ===
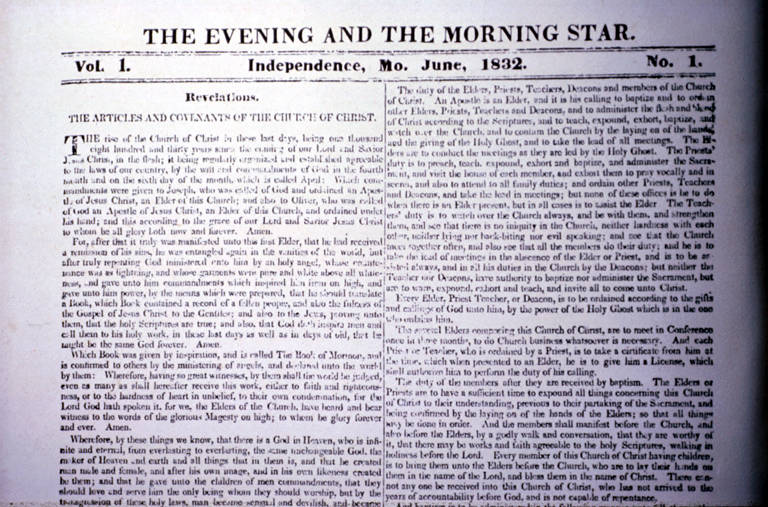
June 1832 edition of the Evening and Morning Star, published by W. W. Phelps

Phelps moved to Kirtland, Ohio in 1831. He soon visited Joseph Smith and asked him to ask God for an answer as to what Phelps should do. Smith delivered a revelation (now known as section 55 of the Doctrine and Covenants) in which Phelps was encouraged to join the church, preach as a missionary, and be the printer for the church. He was then baptized on June 16, 1831. He was subsequently chosen "to head printing and publishing for the Church" a few days later, on June 20. he moved to Jackson County, Missouri in 1832 and spearheaded the church's publishing arm, W. W. Phelps & Co., in Independence, Missouri, where he edited the Evening and Morning Star from June 1832 to 1833. He was also superintendent of the local schools. On July 20, 1833, while working to publish the church's Book of Commandments, a mob of vigilantes attacked Phelps's home, seizing printing materials, destroying the press, and throwing Phelps's family and furniture out-of-doors. Most of the copies of the Book of Commandments were destroyed in the raid. He fled to Clay County, Missouri, where he was called as Assistant President of the Church in Missouri on July 3, 1834.

In the early part of 1835, Phelps and his son, Waterman, were called to Kirtland, arriving on May 16, 1835, and departing on April 9, 1836. They resided temporarily with Joseph Smith's family. During his stay in Kirtland, Phelps acted as "co-steward over the modern revelations" alongside Joseph Smith, editing the sections of the Doctrine and Covenants for publication. He was also tasked with editing and publishing the Latter Day Saints' Messenger and Advocate. Phelps donated US$500 towards the erection of the Kirtland Temple and was present for the establishment of the School of the Prophets. In Kirtland, he helped print the first Latter Day Saint hymnal in 1835, which included his own hymn, "The Spirit of God Like a Fire Is Burning", sung at the dedication of the Kirtland Temple. Phelps wrote "at least thirty-five of the ninety hymns" included in the first LDS hymnal.

In late June or early July 1835, Joseph Smith acquired Egyptian papyri from Michael Chandler, and Phelps began assisting with the translation of what would become the Book of Abraham in the Pearl of Great Price, acting as Smith's scribe. On January 13, 1836, Phelps was tasked with compiling the "rules and regulations" of the Kirtland Temple.

=== Far West, Missouri ===
From 1834, Phelps was a counselor to David Whitmer in the presidency of the church in Missouri, and, in that capacity, he helped found the town of Far West, Missouri, purchasing the land for the town using church funds alongside John Whitmer. He served as postmaster in Far West.

Phelps was called before the High Council on March 10, 1838, and was accused of profiting from Far West land deals and reneging on a $2,000 contribution to "the house of the Lord" that was not paid. He was excommunicated from the church that day.

In June, Phelps, Oliver Cowdery, David Whitmer, John Whitmer, and Lyman E. Johnson were warned to leave Far West, "or a more fatal calamity shall befall you." Unlike Cowdery and the Whitmers, Phelps remained in Far West.

He appears to have had a short-lived détente with church leadership. On July 8, Smith received a revelation saying that Phelps and fellow dissenter, Frederick G. Williams, could be ordained as elders and serve missions abroad. As part of the 1838 Mormon War, at the time of the Mormon surrender of Far West on November 1, Phelps was one of the Mormon negotiators.

But during the treason hearing of Smith in Richmond, beginning November 12, Phelps was one of several who bore witness against Smith and other leaders, aiding in their imprisonment in Missouri until April 1839. According to The Joseph Smith Papers, "his testimony helped lead to Smith's incarceration in the Liberty, Missouri, jail in winter 1838–1839." This led to Phelps's excommunication in Quincy, Illinois on March 17, 1839. He then moved to Dayton, Ohio.

=== Reconciliation and rebaptism ===
In June 1840, Phelps pleaded for forgiveness in a letter to Smith. Smith replied with an offer of full fellowship, and ended with a variant of Charles Wesley's couplet, "'Come on, dear brother, since the war is past, For friends at first are friends again at last.'" Phelps thus reunited with the church through rebaptism sixteen months after his excommunication.

He moved back to Kirtland in May 1841.

== Nauvoo years ==
Phelps served a brief mission in the eastern United States in 1841. He then moved to Nauvoo, Illinois, where he donated $1,000 to the construction of the Nauvoo Temple and worked there in as an ordinance worker. On August 27, 1841, he replaced Robert B. Thompson as Smith's clerk. Beginning in February 1843, Phelps became the ghostwriter of many of Smith's important written works of the Nauvoo period, including "General Joseph Smith's Appeal to the Green Mountain Boys" of November 1843; Smith's theodemocratic presidential platform of January 1844; and "The Voice of Innocence", which was presented to and unanimously approved by the Relief Society in February 1844 to rebut claims of polygamy in Nauvoo. Phelps also worked alongside John Taylor in editing the Times and Seasons and Nauvoo Neighbor and Willard Richards in compiling Joseph Smith's personal history. The latter effort eventually became History of the Church.

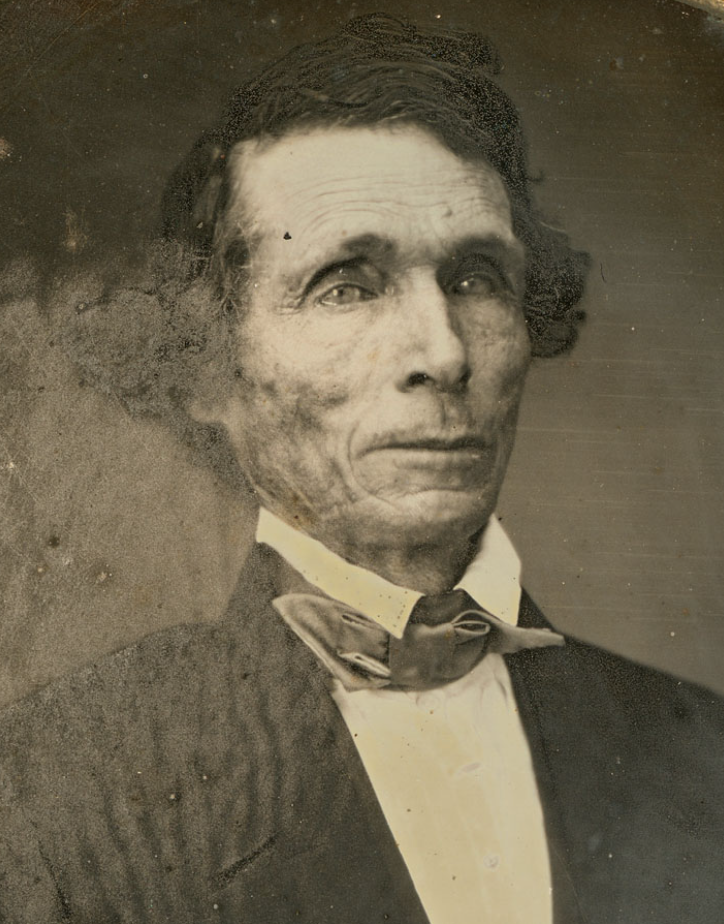
W. W. Phelps, ca. 1850–1860

Phelps was endowed on December 9, 1843 and received his "second anointing" on February 2, 1844, promising him exaltation. He was also made a member of the Council of Fifty and the Nauvoo City Council. In Nauvoo, Phelps spoke out in favor of the destruction of an opposition newspaper, the Nauvoo Expositor. He believed that the city charter gave the church leaders power to declare the newspaper a nuisance. Shortly afterwards, the press and type were carried into the street and destroyed. After the death of Joseph Smith, Phelps gave the eulogy at his funeral.

During the succession crisis in 1844, Phelps sided with Brigham Young and the Quorum of the Twelve. In an effort to maintain order in the church, "he used his considerable influence in August and September 1844 to sustain the Twelve Apostles as leaders during the succession crisis." In 1846, he entered into plural marriage, marrying Laura Stowell and Elizabeth Dunn on February 2, 1846, in Nauvoo. He was excommunicated for the third time on December 9, 1847, for entering into an unauthorized polygamous marriage, but he was rebaptized two days later.

== Westward exodus, death, and legacy ==
Phelps took part in the Mormon Exodus across the Great Plains. At Winter Quarters he was credited with ordering "unquestionably the first press to reach Nebraska soil" from Philadelphia. When it arrived in 1847, a pamphlet was printed that announced, "we have a printing press" and solicited local printing business.

After leaving Winter Quarters, Phelps settled in Salt Lake City in 1848. In November 1849, he left Salt Lake to explore southern Utah Territory with Parley P. Pratt. Phelps also served in the Utah territorial legislature from 1851 to 1857 and on the board of regents for the University of Deseret (now the University of Utah). He participated in the creation of the Provisional State of Deseret's constitution and wrote an almanac documenting the activities of the Latter-day Saints in Utah for fourteen years. He also helped develop the Deseret alphabet and obtained the first printing press used to print the Deseret News. He wrote poems and articles for the Deseret News, as well as essays on religious topics such as the Second Coming, the priesthood, and Joseph Smith's revelations. He began working as a lawyer in 1851 and "defended numerous Saints in the courts." Phelps also joined the Deseret Horticultural Society and Deseret Theological Institute. In 1856, he wrote the LDS hymn "If You Could Hie to Kolob" for Brigham Young. He died on March 7, 1872, in Salt Lake City, Utah Territory and is buried in the Salt Lake City Cemetery. According to attorney and author George M. McCune, "He died a faithful and zealous disciple of the restoration."

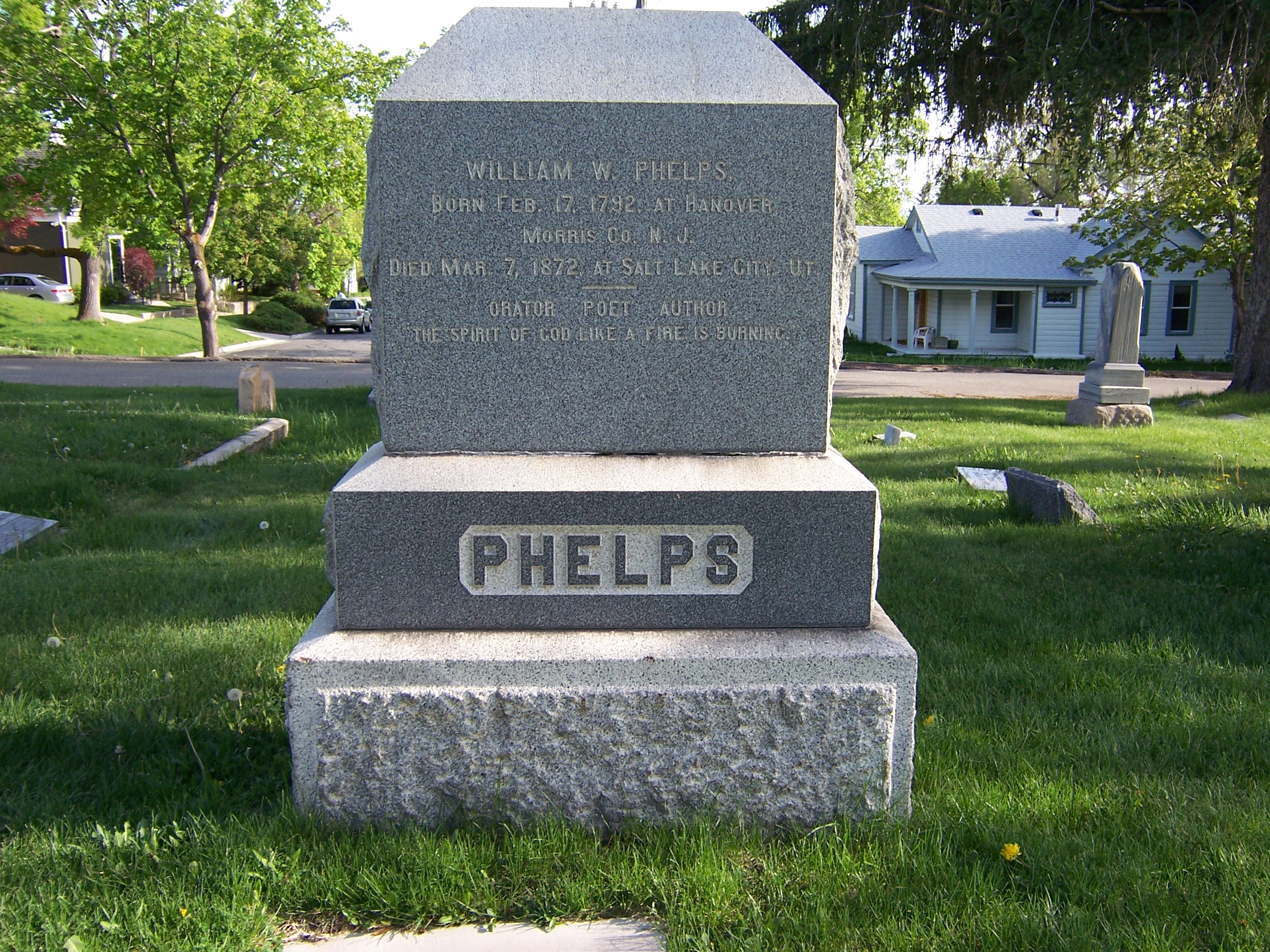
Phelps' grave marker. The back is inscribed with the words "There is no end to matter/There is no end to space/There is no end to spirit/There is no end to race. There is no end to glory/There is no end to love/There is no end to being/There is no death above," from the hymn "If You Could Hie to Kolob".

== Hymns ==
Phelps is probably best known for his legacy of Mormon hymns, many of which appear in the current edition of the LDS Church's hymnal.

- Adam-ondi-Ahman*
- Come, All Ye Saints of Zion*
- Come, All Ye Saints Who Dwell on Earth*
- Come, Let Us Sing an Evening Hymn*
- Gently Raise the Sacred Strain*
- Glorious Things Are Sung of Zion
- Hosanna Anthem
- If You Could Hie to Kolob
- Now Let Us Rejoice*
- Now We'll Sing with One Accord*
- O God, the Eternal Father*
- O Stop and Tell Me, Red Man*
- Praise to the Man
- The Spirit of God Like a Fire Is Burning*
- We're Not Ashamed to Own Our Lord*

Phelps also reworded popular hymns turning them into uniquely Latter Day Saint hymns.

- Joy to the World! the Lord will Come*
- Redeemer of Israel*

* Included in the first Latter Day Saint hymnal in 1835.

== See also ==
- 1843 polygamy revelation
