= Manchester Hymnal =

Collection of hymns

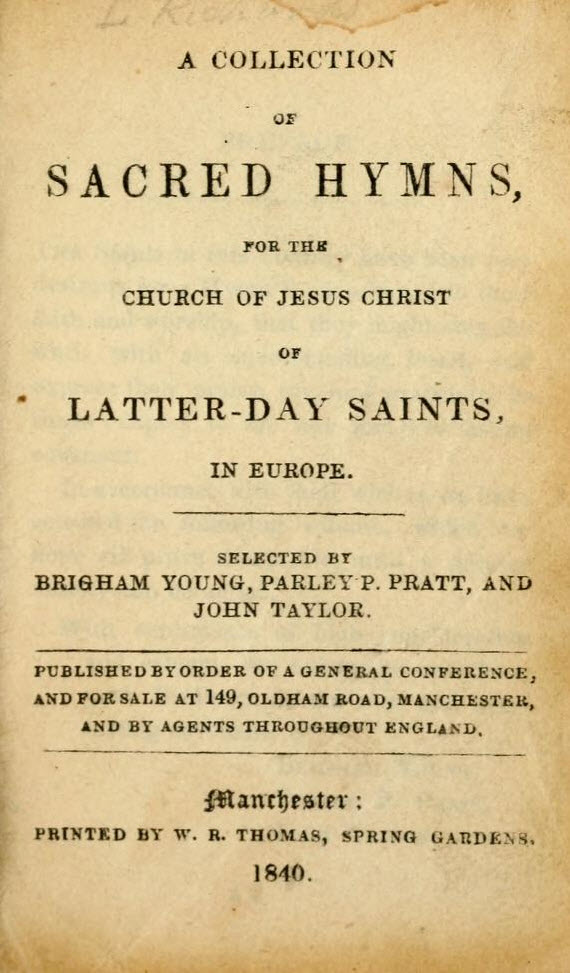
Title page of Collection of Sacred Hymns, 1840.

== A Collection of Sacred Hymns for the Church of Jesus Christ of Latter-day Saints in Europe ==
In 1840, Brigham Young, Parley P. Pratt and John Taylor published a words-only hymnal for the church in Manchester, England, titled A Collection of Sacred Hymns for the Church of Jesus Christ of Latter-day Saints in Europe. Informally known as the Manchester Hymnal or "Small Hymnal", it was by far the longest-lived of all LDS hymnals, with 25 editions published between 1840 and 1927. Over the years, publication of this hymnal moved from Manchester to Liverpool, and finally to Salt Lake City in 1890. As more hymns were added, the book grew from 323 pages in 1840 to 456 pages in the 1905 edition. However, it was still a words-only hymnal; the tunes were sung from memory or by referencing a tune book alongside the hymnbook.

== Background ==
Following the publication of the 1835 hymnbook, a few unauthorized hymnals were published. Recognizing a growing need for hymnals in Mormon congregations in the eastern United States, David Rogers published a new version of the hymnal in 1838. The style, preface, layout, and many of the hymns were copied from the official 1835 hymn book, but forty of the ninety hymns were swapped out. Around thirty of the new hymns were written by Mormons, including five by the influential apostle Parley P. Pratt. A year later, Benjamin C. Elsworth published another hymnal that also plagiarized Emma Smith's preface and used sixty-six hymns from her collection, as well as almost all the ones Rogers had added. By 1 July 1839, the prophet and Quorum of the Twelve met to compile a new hymnbook, and apparently even weighed the idea of reprinting or adapting Rogers's work. At a Church conference that fall, however, Rogers's work was publicly criticized and it was requested that it be "utterly discarded by the church". Six months later, charges were brought against Rogers for "compiling an Hymn Book, and selling it as the one selected and published by sister Emma Smith", among other things. Despite the unauthorized nature of Rogers's hymnal, it demonstrated a need for new hymnbooks and a trend towards using hymns authorized by Latter Day Saints.

== Manchester Hymnal Publication ==
In 1839, the Quorum of the Twelve worked towards printing their own hymnal in Manchester, England. This hymnbook, in its own way, was unauthorized. In October of 1839, a high council "voted that Sister Emma Smith, select and publish a hymn Book for the use of the Church, and that Brigham Young be informed of the same, and he not publish the hymns taken by him from Commerce". Brigham Young may have never heard word of the high council's decision or simply ignored it, and the Quorum of the Twelve proceeded to publish a hymnal compiled by Brigham Young, Parley P. Pratt, and John Taylor that was titled A Collection of Sacred Hymns for the Church of Jesus Christ of Latter-day Saints in Europe. Despite previously indicating that he was opposed to printing a new hymnbook outside of Nauvoo and expressing some initial anger over publishing it without his permission, Joseph Smith eventually gave his approval to the work.

The compilers' hope, as recorded in the preface, was to create "a Hymn Book adapted" to the British Saints' "faith and worship, that they might sing the truth ... and express their praise, joy and gratitude, in songs adapted to the new and everlasting covenant." Seventy-eight hymns from the 1835 hymnbook were included, while one-hundred-and-ninety-three texts were added. (Parley P. Pratt alone contributed some 50 hymns while editing the hymnal.) Printed in 1840, this hymnbook beat Emma's hymnbook to the press by a year. The Manchester hymnbook would go on to serve as the Church's official hymnbook for eighty-seven years—longer than any other hymnal in its history.

== The Latter-day Saints' Psalmody ==
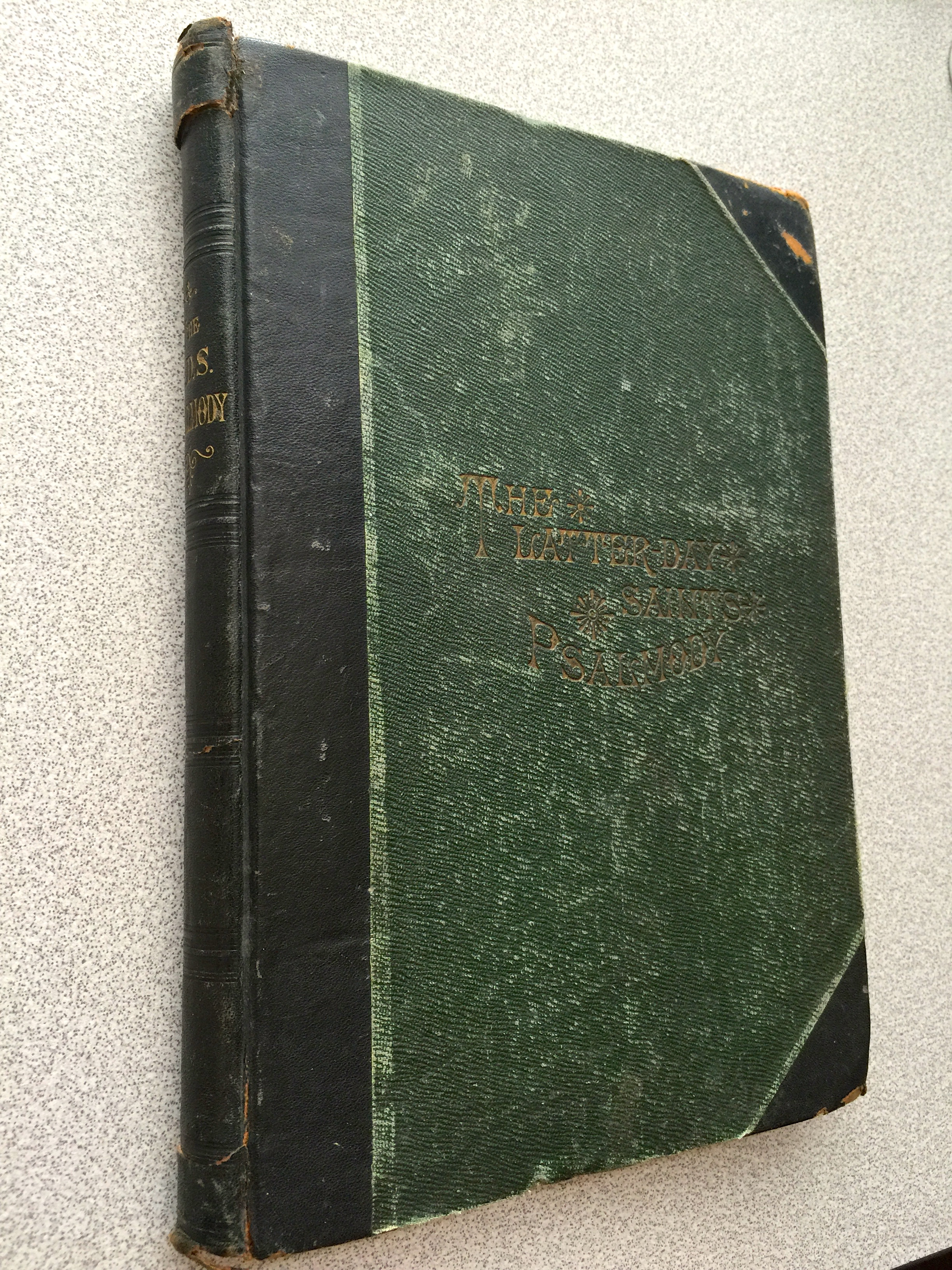
1896 The Latter-Day Saints Psalmody 2nd Edition

In 1889, the LDS Church published a tune book to accompany the Manchester Hymnal titled The Latter-day Saints' Psalmody. The Psalmody was a conscious effort by church leaders to develop a hymn style of their own. Budding composers in the church were encouraged to submit new tunes to fit the new and old lyrics. Many Latter-day Saint hymns that had been published in the previous decades in periodicals like the Utah Magazine, the Utah Musical Times, the Utah Musical Bouquet, and the Juvenile Instructor were included. Some tunes were also adopted from non-LDS sources, such as classical composers like Handel, Haydn, Mozart, Mendelssohn, and Rossini.

The Psalmody was intended to be a supplement to the "Manchester Hymnal". Each hymn in the Psalmody was cross-referenced by page number to the "Manchester Hymnal" and only used a few verses of the full hymn text.

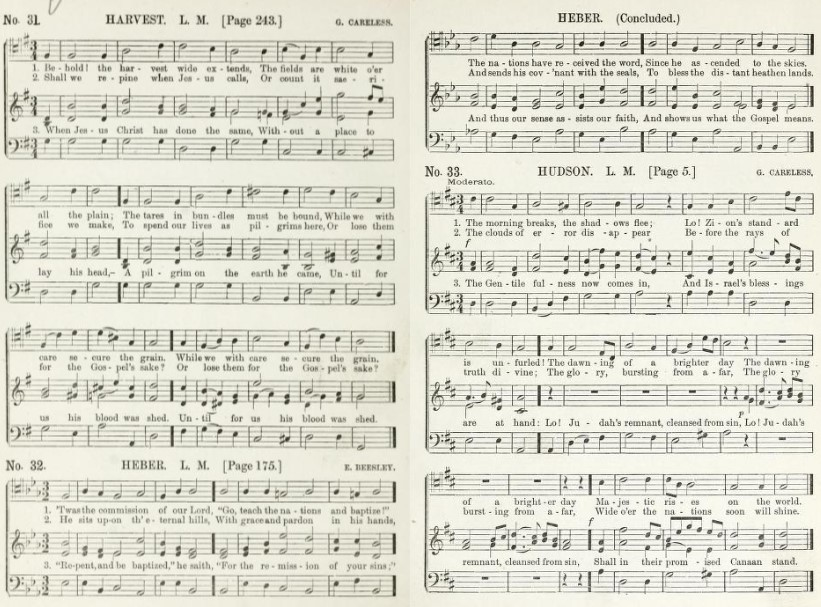
Example of music in the Latter-day Saints' Psalmody

By today's standards many of the hymns are quite challenging, even for choirs, let alone congregational singing. They were very high-pitched, sometimes ascending above the staff to a high g' or a' in the soprano parts. The tenor parts were written on a separate staff above the soprano and alto lines, making accompaniment difficult. Still, the 330 hymns in the 1889 Psalmody show tremendous skill in composition and originality.

About half of the new hymn tunes that were composed for the Psalmody were written by members of the Church Music Committee, which included Evan Stephens, George Careless, Ebenezer Beesley, Joseph J. Daynes, and Thomas C. Griggs. These men were accomplished musicians, composers, and Mormon Tabernacle Choir conductors. Many of their Psalmody hymn tunes have a pronounced "instrumental" feel, as if they were more suited for organ performance than choir or congregational singing.

== List of Songs (by first line) ==
=== Public Worship ===
- 1. The Morning Breaks, the Shadows Flee
- 2. Let Every Mortal Ear Attend
- 3. Glorious Things of Thee Are Spoken
- 4. The Time Is Nigh, That Happy Time
- 5. Great Is the Lord! 'Tis Good to Praise
- 6. Let All Creation Join
- 7. O Happy Souls Who Pray
- 8. Praise to God, Immortal Praise
- 9. We're Not Ashamed to Own Our Lord
- 10. Joy to the World! the Lord Will Come!
- 11. To Him That Made the World
- 12. Ere Long the Veil Will Rend in Twain
- 13. Jesus the Name That Charms Our Fears
- 14. Come All Ye Saints Who Dwell on Earth
- 15. God Spake the Word, and Time Began
- 16. Mortals Awake! With Angels Join
- 17. O Jesus! the Giver
- 18. Ho! Every One That Thirsts, Draw Nigh
- 19. And Can I Yet Delay
- 20. Come, Lord, from above, the Mountains Remove
- 21. God Moves in a Mysterious Way
- 22. Shepherd, of Souls, with Pitying Eye
- 23. Away, My Unbelieving Fear!
- 24. Peace Troubled Soul, Thou Need'st Not Fear
- 25. Come Sinners to the Gospel Feast
- 26. Thou Shepherd of Israel, and Mine
- 27. Be It My Only Wisdom Here
- 28. Come, Ye That Love the Lord
- 29. Happy Soul, That, Free from Harms
- 30. Happy the Man That Finds the Grace
- 31. Happy the Souls That First Believed
- 32. Jesus from Whom All Blessings Flow
- 33. Weary Souls, That Wander Wide
- 34. Ye Simple Souls, That Stray
- 35. Sinners, Believe the Gospel Word
- 36. Would Jesus Have the Sinner Die?
- 37. Let Earth and Heaven Agree
- 38. Jesus, Thou All-Redeeming Lord
- 39. Come, Let Us Anew Our Journey Pursue
- 40. What Are These Arrayed in White
- 41. Spirit of Faith, Come Down
- 42. Come, Holy Ghost, Our Hearts Inspire
- 43. Inspirer of the Ancient Seers
- 44. Author of Faith, Eternal Word
- 45. O Disclose Thy Lovely Face
- 46. And Can It Be That I Should Gain
- 47. My God, I Am Thine, What a Comfort Divine
- 48. Let All Men Rejoice, By Jesus Restored
- 49. My God, the Spring of All My Joys
- 50. Talk with Us, Lord, Thyself Reveal
- 51. How Happy, Gracious Lord, Are We
- 52. When Israel out of Egypt Came
- 53. I'll Praise My Maker While I've Breath
- 54. Praise Ye the Lord! 'Tis Good to Raise
- 55. Away with Our Fears! The Glad Morning Appears
- 56. Blest Be Our Everlasting Lord
- 57. Jehovah, God the Father, Bless
- 58. Father, How Wide Thy Glory Shines!
- 59. Soldiers of Christ, Arise
- 60. Peace! Doubting Heart; My God's I Am
- 61. Shall I, for Fear of Feeble Man
- 62. Come, Saviour Jesus, from Above
- 63. Shepherd Divine, Our Wants Relieve
- 64. Jesus, My Strength, My Hope
- 65. Saviour, on Me the Want Bestow
- 66. Hark, How the Watchmen Cry
- 67. Ye, Who in His Courts Are Found
- 68. Captain of Israel's Host, and Guide
- 69. When Quiet in My House I Sit
- 70. O Thou, to Whose All-Searching Sight
- 71. From All That Dwell below the Skies
- 72. Come, Let Us Join Our Cheerful Songs
- 73. Praise the Lord, Who Reigns Above
- 74. Awake, and Sing the Song
- 75. Begin, My Tongue, the Heavenly Theme
- 76. Let Heathens to Their Idols Haste
- 77. This God Is the God We Adore
- 78. With Israel's God Who Can Compare?
- 79. O'er the Gloomy Hills of Darkness
- 80. Come Hither, All Ye Weary Souls
- 81. Ye Dying Sons of Men
- 82. Before Jehovah's Awful Throne
- 83. Come, Sound His Praise Abroad
- 84. My Soul, How Lovely Is the Place
- 85. Lord, We Come before Thee Now
- 86. Come, Dearest Lord, Descend and Dwell
- 87. Come, Thou Desire of All Thy Saints
- 88. God of My Life, to Thee I Call
- 89. As the Dew, from Heaven Distilling
- 90. O Thou, at Whose Almighty Word
- 91. Once More We Come before Our God
- 92. Come, Guilty Souls, and Flee Away
- 93. How Precious Is Thy Word, O Lord!
- 94. Arise, O King of Kings, Arise
- 95. Lord, Dismiss Us with Thy Blessing
- 96. May We, Who Know the Joyful Sound
- 97. O Jesus, Our Lord, Thy Name Be Adored
- 98. The Rising Sun Has Chased the Night
- 99. Ye Ransomed Sinners Hear
- 100. Lord, I Believe Thy Every Word
- 101. Let Not the Wise His Wisdom Boast
- 102. Father, to Thee My Soul I Lift
- 103. Messiah, Full of Grace
- 104. And Are We Yet Alive
- 105. All Praise to Our Redeeming Lord
- 106. Jesus, Lord, We Look to Thee
- 107. Praise Ye the Lord, My Heart Shall Join
- 108. Kingdoms and Thrones to God Belong
- 109. O Lord, Our Heavenly King
- 110. Lord, Thou Hast Searched and Seen Me Through
- 111. The Veil of Night Is No Disguise
- 112. Sweet Is the Memory of Thy Grace
- 113. With All My Powers of Heart and Tongue
- 114. O God, on Thee We All Depend
- 115. Ye Sons of Men, a Feeble Race
- 116. Dismiss Your Anxious Care
- 117. When God's Own People Stand in Need
- 118. When All Thy Mercies, O My God
- 119. How Pleasant, How Divinely Fair
- 120. Sweet Is the Work, My God, My King
- 121. Not to the Terrors of the Lord
- 122. Come, Holy Spirit, Heavenly Dove
- 123. How Happy Every Child of Grace
- 124. When I Can Read My Title Clear
- 125. Except the Lord Conduct the Plan
- 126. And Let Our Bodies Part
- 127. God of All Consolation, Take
- 128. Sing to the Great Jehovah's Praise
- 129. I Long to Behold Him Arrayed
- 130. On Jordan's Stormy Banks I Stand
- 131. Soon as I heard My Father Say
- 132. Great God, Attend, While Zion Sings
- 133. O God, Our Help in Ages Past

=== Dismission – Doxologies ===
- 134. May the Grace of Christ our Saviour
- 135. Praise God, from Whom All Blessings Flow
- 136. Glory to God on High
- 137. To Father, Son, and Holy Ghost

=== Sacramental Hymns ===
- 138. Alas! and Did My Saviour Bleed!
- 139. Twas on That Dark, That Solemn Night
- 140. Arise, My Soul, Arise
- 141. Behold the Saviour of Mankind
- 142. He Died; the Great Redeemer Died
- 143. O God, the Eternal Father
- 144. I Know That My Redeemer Lives
- 145. Gently Raise the Sacred Strain
- 146. Ye Children of Our God
- 147. Behold Thy Sons and Daughters, Lord

=== Baptismal Hymns ===
- 148. Jesus, Mighty King in Zion
- 149. In Jordan's Tide the Prophet Stands
- 150. Salem's Bright King, Jesus by Name
- 151. Come Ye Children of the Kingdom
- 152. Do We Not Know That Solemn Word
- 153. In Pleasure Sweet Here We Do Meet
- 154. Thus Was the Great Redeemer Plunged
- 155. Never Does Truth More Shine
- 156. Come, All Ye Sons of Grace, and View
- 157. All You That Love Immanuel's Name
- 158. Dear Lord, and Will Thy Pardoning Love
- 159. Behold the Lamb of God!
- 160. 'Twas the Commission of Our Lord
- 161. In Ancient Times a Man of God
- 162. Father in Heaven, We Do Believe
- 163. How Foolish to the Carnal Mind
- 164. Lo! on the Water's Brink We Stand
- 165. Come, Humble Sinner, in Whose Breast
- 166. Repent Ye Gentiles All

=== Funeral Hymns ===
- 167. Hark! from the Tombs a Doleful Sound
- 168. Why Do We Mourn for Dying Friends
- 169. Why Should We Start and Fear to Die!
- 170. Creation Speaks with Awful Voice
- 171. The Morning Flowers Display Their Sweets

=== On Priesthood ===
- 172. In Ancient Days Men Feared the Lord
- 173. Now We'll Sing with One Accord

=== Second Coming of Christ ===
- 174. Awake, O Ye People! The Saviour Is Coming
- 175. From the Regions of Glory an Angel Descended
- 176. Let All the Saints Their Hearts Prepare
- 177. Let Us Pray, Gladly Pray
- 178. Let Zion in Her Beauty Rise
- 179. My Soul Is Full of Peace and Love
- 180. Now Let Us Rejoice in the Day of Salvation
- 181. The Glorious Day Is Rolling On
- 182. Behold the Great Redeemer Comes
- 183. Behold the Saviour Comes
- 184. Earth Is the Place Where Christ Will Reign
- 185. Behold the Mount of Olives Rend!
- 186. Hosanna to the Great Messiah
- 187. Jesus Once of Humble Birth
- 188. This Earth Shall Be a Blessed Place
- 189. At First, the Babe of Bethlehem
- 190. Come, O! Thou King of Kings!
- 191. Let All the Saints Their Hearts Prepare

=== Gathering of Israel ===
- 192. Redeemer of Israel
- 193. What Wondrous Things We Now Behold
- 194. Ye Ransomed of the Lord
- 195. An Holy Angel from on High
- 196. What Wondrous Scenes Mine Eyes Behold
- 197. An Angel from on High
- 198. On Mountain Tops the Mount of God

=== Morning Hymns ===
- 199. Awake! for the Morning Is Come
- 200. Awake My Soul, and with the Sun
- 201. Lord, in the Morning Thou Shalt Hear
- 202. Once More, My Soul, the Rising Day
- 203. See How the Morning Sun
- 204. Waked from My Bed of Slumber Sweet

=== Evening Hymns ===
- 205. Come, Let Us Sing an Evening Hymn
- 206. Glory to Thee, My God, This Night
- 207. Great God! to Thee My Evening Song
- 208. Lord, Thou Wilt Hear Me When I Pray
- 209. The Day Is Past and Gone

=== Farewell Hymns ===
- 210. Adieu My Dear Brethren Adieu
- 211. Farewell, Our Friends and Brethren!
- 212. From Greenland's Icy Mountains
- 213. How Often in Sweet Meditation, My Mind
- 214. The Gallant Ship Is under Way
- 215. Yes, My Native Land, I Love Thee
- 216. Farewell, My Kind and Faithful Friend
- 217. Adieu to the city, Where Long I Have Wandered
- 218. Keep These Few Lines Till Time Shall End
- 219. Farewell, Ye Servants of the Lord
- 220. When Shall We All Meet Again?
- 221. To Leave My Dear Friends, and from Neighbors to Part
- 222. When Time Shall Be No More

=== Miscellaneous ===
- 223. An Angel Came down from the Mansions of Glory
- 224. Before this Earth from Chaos Sprung
- 225. A Poor Wayfaring Man of Grief
- 226. Come, All Ye Sons of Zion
- 227. Earth, with Her Ten Thousand Flowers
- 228. Guide Us, O Thou Great Jehovah
- 229. How Firm a Foundation, Ye Saints of the Lord
- 230. How Pleasant 'Tis to See
- 231. How Pleased and Blessed Was I
- 232. Know Then That Every Soul Is Free
- 233. The Great and Glorious Gospel Light
- 234. The Happy Day Has Rolled On
- 235. The Lord into His Garden Comes
- 236. The Spirit of God Like a Fire Is Burning
- 237. The Sun That Declines in the Far Western Sky
- 238. The Cities of Zion Soon Shall Rise
- 239. There's a Feast of Fat Things for the Righteous Preparing
- 240. This Land Was Once a Glorious Place
- 241. Though, in the Outward Church Below
- 242. What Fair One Is This, from the Wilderness Traveling
- 243. When Joseph His Brethren Beheld
- 244. When Restless on My Bed I Lie
- 245. Hark! Listen to the Trumpeters
- 246. The Pure Testimony Poured Forth in the Spirit
- 247. Afflicted Saint, to Christ Draw Near
- 248. Daniel's Wisdom May I Know
- 249. When Joseph Saw His Brethren Moved
- 250. Ye Wondering Nations, Now Give Ear
- 251. I Saw a Mighty Angel Fly
- 252. Go, Ye Messengers of Glory
- 253. All Hail the Glorious Day
- 254. The Glorious Plan, Which God Has Given
- 255. Truth Reflects upon Our Senses
- 256. Stars of Morning, Shout for Joy
- 257. Let Judah Rejoice in This Glorious News
- 258. When Earth in Bondage Long Had Lain
- 259. The Solid Rocks Were Rent in Twain
- 260. O Who That Has Searched in the Records of Old
- 261. Hark! Listen to the Gentle Breeze
- 262. Another Day Has Fled and Gone
- 263. How Fleet the Precious Moments Roll!
- 264. Lift up Your Heads, Ye Scattered Saints
- 265. Torn from Our Friends and Captive Led
- 266. This Morning in Silence I Ponder and Mourn
- 267. 'Mid Scenes of Confusion and Creature Complaints
- 268. By the River's Verdant Side
- 269. O Zion, When I Think on Thee
- 270. Children of Zion, Awake from Your Sadness
- 271. I Have No Home, Where Shall I Go?

== Examples of Hymns Added in Later Editions ==
- "Come, Come, Ye Saints" (All Is Well), added in the 1851 edition as Hymn 46
- "If You Could Hie to Kolob", added in the 1869 edition as Hymn 230

== See also ==
- Hymns in the Church of Jesus Christ of Latter-day Saints
