= Ebenezer Beesley =

American musician (1840–1906)

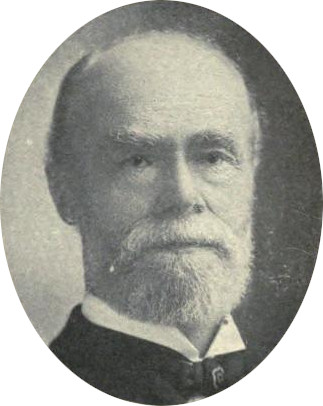
- Born: December 14, 1840; Bicester, England
- Died: March 21, 1906 (aged 65); Salt Lake City, Utah
- Known for: Composer of LDS hymns and director of the Tabernacle Choir

Ebenezer Beesley (14 December 1840 – 21 March 1906) was a Latter-day Saint hymn writer and composer. The music for twelve of the hymns in the 1985 English-language hymnal of the Church of Jesus Christ of Latter-day Saints (LDS Church) were written by him.

Beesley was born in Bicester, Oxfordshire, England. His parents joined the LDS Church when he was quite young and he was baptized a member of the church on 22 September 1849.

In 1859, Beesley, a cobbler, emigrated to Utah Territory in the George Rowley Handcart Company with his family, including first wife Sarah Hancock Beesley. They first lived in Tooele, Utah, but later they moved to Salt Lake City. In the 19th Ward in Salt Lake City, Beesley served as both choir director and music director for Sunday School. He studied under George Careless. In 1863, Beesley joined the Salt Lake Theatre Orchestra, where he played the violin.

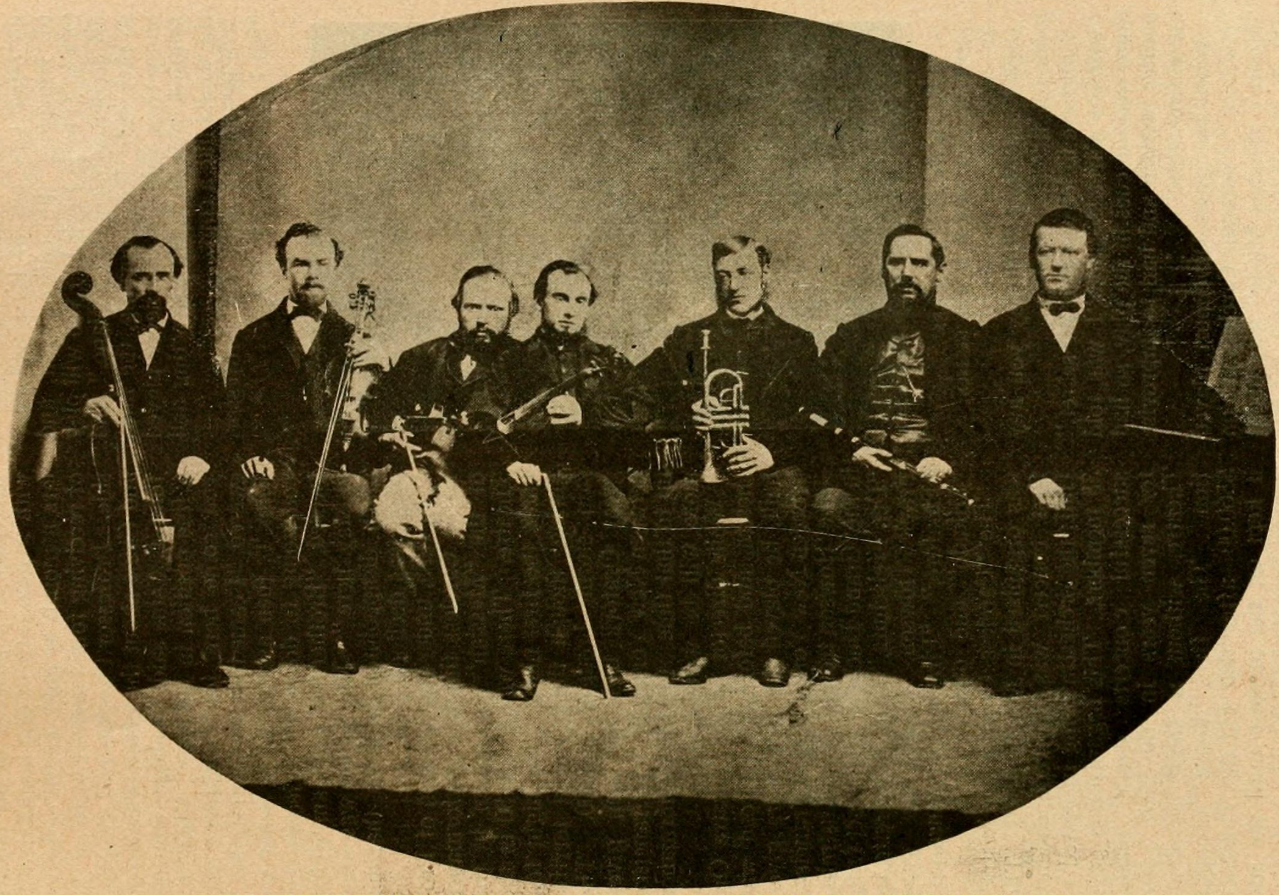
Salt Lake Theatre Orchestra 1868.From Left to Right: Joshua Midgley (Bass), Ebenezer Beesley (Cello), David W. Evans(Violin), George Careless (Director, violin), Mark Croxall (Cornet), Horace K. Whitney (Flute), Orson Pratt Jr.(Piano).

In 1869 he married Anne Frewin Buckeridge in a polygamist marriage and had six children with her. He became the father of 16 children in total between the years 1860 and 1883.

Beesley was a contributor to the Juvenile Instructor magazine. He also was one of the men appointed by John Taylor to oversee the publication of the 1860 (and later the 1883) Latter-day Saints' Psalmody, which was the first LDS Church hymnbook to include music.

In 1880, Beesley became the director of the Mormon Tabernacle Choir. In September of that year, Beesley led the choir's first excursion outside of Salt Lake City on a trip to American Fork, Utah where they performed with the local choir for a large group of citizens. Beesley served as the choir director until 1889.

After serving with the Mormon Tabernacle Choir, Beesley taught music in Tooele, and then for a time in Lehi, Utah. He then moved back to Salt Lake City where he died.

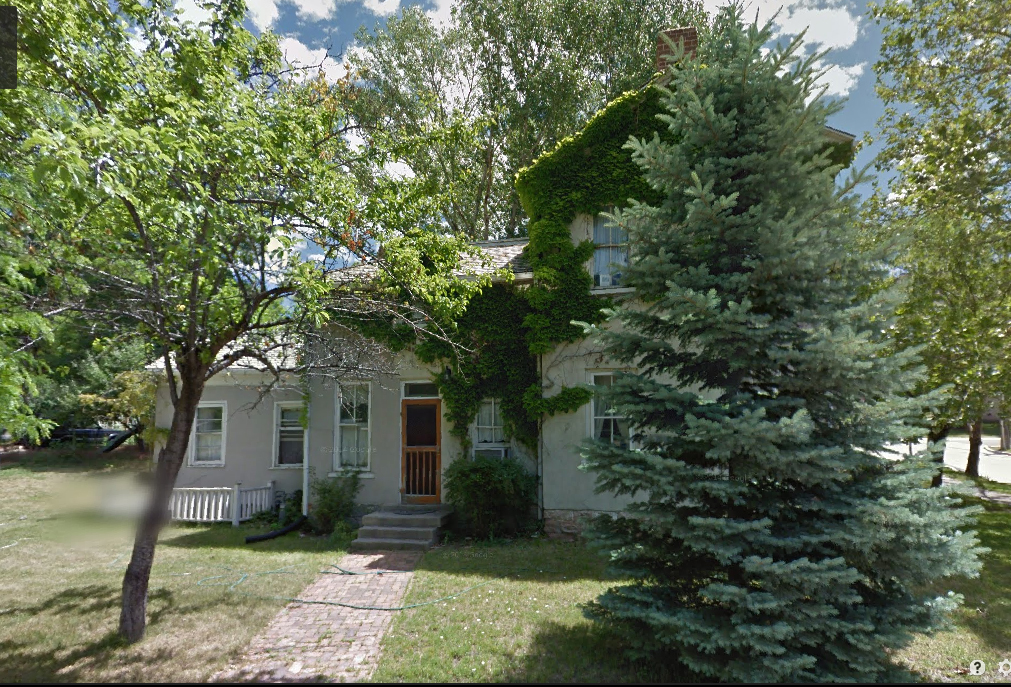
The Ebenezer Beesley House is listed on the National Register of Historic Places.

In the 1985 LDS Church hymnal the music for the following hymns was composed by Beesley:

- 5 "High on the Mountain Top"
- 16 "What Glorious Scenes Mine Eyes Behold"
- 32 "The Happy Day at Last Has Come"
- 76 "God of Our Fathers, We Come unto Thee"
- 77 "Great Is the Lord"
- 156 "Sing We Now at Parting"
- 177 "Tis Sweet to Sing the Matchless Love" (tune name Hancock)
- 185 "Reverently and Meekly Now"
- 232 "Let Us Oft Speak Kind Words"
- 280 "Welcome, Welcome, Sabbath Morning"
- 282 "We Meet Again in Sabbath School"

== See also ==
- Ebenezer Beesley House
