= Collection of Sacred Hymns (Kirtland, Ohio) =

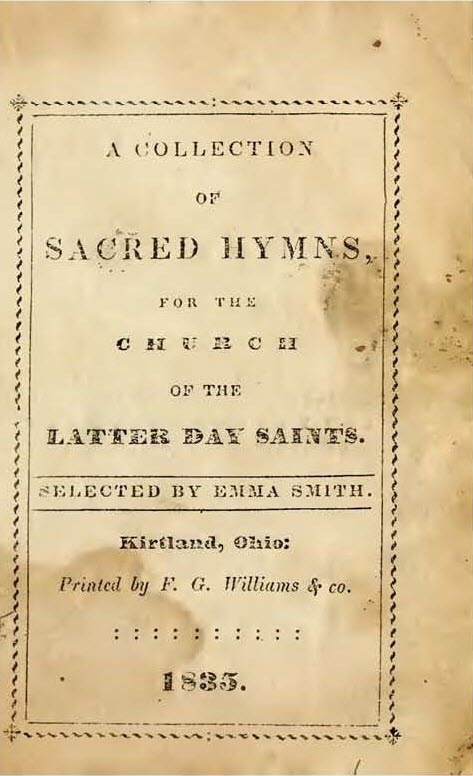
Title page of Collection of Sacred Hymns, 1835.

A Collection of Sacred Hymns, for the Church of the Latter Day Saints. was the first hymnal of the Latter Day Saint movement. It was published in 1835 by the Church of the Latter Day Saints.

== Early LDS Hymns ==
In July 1830, Joseph Smith stated he received a revelation from God for his wife, Emma, to select hymns for the Church of Christ:

And it shall be given thee, also, to make a selection of sacred hymns, as it shall be given thee, which is pleasing unto me, to be had in my church. For my soul delighteth in the song of the heart; yea, the song of the righteous is a prayer unto me, and it shall be answered with a blessing upon their heads.

Initially, it seems that this revelation was interpreted to mean that Emma Smith was commanded to select which hymns were appropriate for use in the worship services of Latter Day Saints and not necessarily to compile a hymnbook. Due in part to this ambiguity in the revelation and in part to persecutions and the constant uprooting of the church in those early days, she was not able to compile a hymnbook for several years. However, in the meantime, other followers continued to write, arrange, and collect hymns.

The first Latter-day Saint hymns were published by W. W. Phelps in June, 1832 in Independence, Missouri. These appeared as text only (no music) in The Evening and the Morning Star, the church's semimonthly newspaper. Many of these lyrics were written by Phelps, while others were borrowed from various Protestant sources and edited by Phelps. The first of these hymns published by Phelps was "What Fair One Is This".

On July 20, 1833, a mob destroyed the church's printing office in Independence, and the publication of the Star was moved to Kirtland, Ohio – the headquarters of the church at that time. In December, 1834, The Evening and the Morning Star was replaced by a new publication: The Messenger and Advocate. Phelps continued to write and collect hymn texts, with assistance from Frederick G. Williams and others.

== Collection of Sacred Hymns ==
On September 14, 1835, at a meeting of the high council and the First Presidency at Kirtland, Emma Smith was again counseled to begin compiling a hymnbook in a joint effort with W. W. Phelps:

It was further decided that Sister Emma Smith proceed to make a selection of Sacred Hymns, according to the revelation; and that President W.W. Phelps be appointed to revise and arrange them for printing.

Emma Smith selected 90 hymn texts for the hymnal, 35 of which were written by Latter-day Saints. Many of these texts were revised or corrected by W. W. Phelps to fit with the theology of the early Latter Day Saint church.

The title page states 1835 as the publication date, but because of the printing of the Doctrine and Covenants the same year, printing of the hymnal was not completed until February 1836.

The book is small – just 3" by 4 1/2" in size. An indication of the poverty of the church members in Kirtland at that time is that the hymnal was published in "sexadecimal" form, the least expensive publishing format for books in those days: sixteen pages were printed on both sides of a single sheet, which was then folded, cut, and sewn into the leather binding. Thus, the entire hymnbook could be printed on just four large sheets of paper. The completed hymnal contained ninety hymns, but only the words were included. As a result, today it is difficult to determine which tunes were used with many of the hymn texts.

Although the book was printed in 1836, it is still referred to as the "1835 hymnal" because of the publication date on the title page. The Kirtland printing of the hymnbook was probably very small – perhaps 500 copies at most. Today, original copies of this hymnbook are extremely rare; less than a dozen are known to exist. On December 5, 2006, an original 1835 hymnal was sold at Christie's Auction House in New York City for $273,600.

The English-language hymnal used by Latter-day Saints today contains 26 songs from this original LDS hymanal, including “The Spirit of God” and “I Know That My Redeemer Lives.”

== Contents ==
=== Sacred Hymns ===
Know then that ev’ry soul is free (Joseph Proud)†
Let ev’ry mortal ear attend (Isaac Watts)
What fair one is this (?Samuel Hutchinson; alt. William W. Phelps)
Glorious things of thee are spoken (John Newton)†
The time is nigh, that happy time (Rebecca Voke)
Redeemer of Israel (William W. Phelps; adapt. from Joseph Swain)†§
See all creation join (Isaac Watts; alt. William W. Phelps)
O happy souls who pray (Isaac Watts; alt. William W. Phelps)
From the regions of glory (Anon.; alt. William W. Phelps)
He died! The great Redeemer died (Isaac Watts; alt. William W. Phelps)†
Earth with her ten thousand flowers (Thomas R. Taylor)†
Praise to God, immortal praise (Anna L. Barbauld)
Guide us, O thou great Jehovah (William Williams; alt. William W. Phelps)†
We’re not ashamed to own our Lord (William W. Phelps; adapt. from Isaac Watts)†
Joy to the World (Isaac Watts; adapt. William W. Phelps)†§
An angel came down from the mansions (William W. Phelps)
To him that made the world (William W. Phelps)
Now let us rejoice (William W. Phelps)†
Ere long the vail will rend in twain (Anon.)
My soul is full of peace and love (William W. Phelps)
The happy day has rolled on (Philo Dibble)†
The great and glorious gospel light (Frederick G. Williams)
This earth was once a garden place (William W. Phelps)†
Gently raise the sacred strain (William W. Phelps)†
When Joseph his brethren beheld (John Newton)
Now we’ll sing with one accord (William W. Phelps)†
Through all the world below (Elder Hibard)
The sun that declines in the far western sky (Anon.)
The towers of Zion soon shall rise (William W. Phelps)
Let all the saints their hearts prepare (Anon.)
Let us pray, gladly pray (William W. Phelps)
Awake, O ye people! the Savior is coming (William W. Phelps)
What wond’rous things we now behold (Anon.)
There is a land the Lord will bless (William W. Phelps)
There’s a feast of fat things for the righteous (William W. Phelps)
There’s a power in the sun (Anon.)

=== Morning Hymns ===
Lord in the morning thou shalt hear (Isaac Watts)
Once more, my soul, the rising day (Isaac Watts)
See how the morning sun (Elizabeth Scott)
My God, how endless is thy love (Isaac Watts)
Awake! for the morning is come (William W. Phelps)
Awake, my soul, and with the sun (Thomas Ken)

=== Evening Hymns ===
Come let us sing an evening hymn (William W. Phelps)†
Lord thou wilt hear me when I pray (Isaac Watts)
Glory to thee, my God, this night (Thomas Ken)
Great God! to thee my evening song (Anne Steele)†
When restless on my bed I lie (Gerard T. Noel)
The day is past and gone (John Leland)

=== Farewell Hymns ===
The gallant ship is under way (Richard Huie)
Farewell, our friends and brethren (William W. Phelps)
Yes, my native land, I love thee (Samuel F. Smith)
Adieu, my dear brethren adieu (Seth Mattison)

=== On Baptism ===
Come ye children of the kingdom(Anon.)
Jesus Mighty King in Zion (John Fellows)
In Jordan’s tide the prophet stands (John Fellows)§
Salem’s bright King, Jesus by name(Anon.)

=== On Sacrament ===
O God th’eternal Father (William W. Phelps)†
’Twas on that dark, that solemn night (Isaac Watts)
Arise, my soul, arise (Charles Wesley)
Behold the Savior of mankind (Samuel Wesley Sr.)
Alas! and did my Savior bleed (Isaac Watts)

=== On Marriage ===
When earth was dress’d in beauty (Anon.)

=== Miscellaneous ===
O stop and tell me, Red Man (William W. Phelps)
And did my Savior die (Anon.)
Come all ye sons of Zion (William W. Phelps; adapt. from Caleb J. Taylor)†
Let Zion in her beauty rise (Edward Partridge; adapt. from John A. Granade)†
Jesus the name that charms our fears (Charles Wesley)
Come all ye saints, who dwell on earth (William W. Phelps)†
God spake the word, and time began (William W. Phelps)
Great is the Lord: ’tis good to praise (Eliza R. Snow)†
The glorious day is rolling on (Eliza R. Snow)
Before this earth from chaos sprung (Anon.)
Thy mercy, my God, is the theme of my song (John Stocker)
From Greenland’s icy mountains (Reginald Heber)
O Jesus! the giver of all we enjoy (Anon.)
In ancient days men fear’d the Lord
Mortals, awake! with angels join (Samuel Medley)
The Lord into his garden comes (Anon.)
I know that my Redeemer lives (Samuel Medley)†§
How often in sweet meditation, my mind (Anon.)
Let thy kingdom, blessed Savior (Anon.)
How firm a foundation (K.)†
How pleasant ’tis to see (Isaac Watts)
How pleased and blest was I (Isaac Watts)
Though in the outward church below (John Newton)
O God! our help in ages past (Isaac Watts)†§
Hark! from the tombs a doleful sound (Isaac Watts)
Why do we mourn for dying friends (Isaac Watts)
Why should we start and fear to die! (Isaac Watts)
The Spirit of God like a fire is burning (William W. Phelps)†§

† Included in the 1985 LDS Hymnal

§ Included in the 2013 Community of Christ Sings hymnal

== Prior Publication of LDS Hymns ==
Many of the hymns which had previously been published in The Evening and the Morning Star were inserted into the 1835 hymnal as a block, almost exactly in the same order as their earlier publication. Twelve of the hymns were also published in The Messenger and Advocate between December 1834 and January 1836:

E&MS	Date	1835 Number	M&A	Date	1835 Number
1:1	Jun 1832	3, 4, 5, 6, 10	1:3	Dec 1834	63
1:3	Aug 1832	7, 8, 9	1:9	Jun 1835	23, 24
1:4	Sept 1832	11, 12	1:10	Jul 1835	41, 57
1:5	Oct 1832	13, 14	1:11	Aug 1835	43, 70
1:7	Dec 1832	15	2:1	Oct 1835	26, 28
1:9	Feb 1833	16,17	2:2	Nov 1835	65
1:10	Mar 1833	18	2:4	Jan 1836	71, 90
1:11	Apr 1833	53			
1:12	May 1833	19			
2:13	Jun 1833	20, 21			
2:14	Jul 1833	22			
2:15	Dec 1833	29			
2:19	Apr 1834	30, 31, 32			
2:20	May 1834	33			

== See also ==
- Hymns in the Church of Jesus Christ of Latter-day Saints
- Adam-ondi-Ahman (hymn): Early reference to Adam-ondi-Ahman
- Joy to the World (Phelps): W. W. Phelps' adaptation of the popular Christmas carol
- The Spirit of God Like a Fire Is Burning: Arguably the most popular Latter Day Saint hymn, which was included as a last-minute addition to the hymnal
