= Hymns—for Home and Church =

Hymnal of the Church of Jesus Christ of Latter-day Saints

- Language: 50 languages
- Genre: Hymnal
- Publisher: The Church of Jesus Christ of Latter-day Saints
- Pages: TBD
- Dewey Decimal: 782.270264
- Preceded by: Hymns of the Church of Jesus Christ of Latter-day Saints

Hymns—for Home and Church is the new hymnal for the Church of Jesus Christ of Latter-day Saints (LDS Church). Online release of small batches began in 2024, with plans to publish the book in late 2027.

== Schedule ==
On June 18, 2018, the church announced that a new hymnal would be created. More than 17,000 song suggestions were submitted in the first year.

The LDS Church released the first batch of new music in May 2024. Additional batches of new music will continue to be released in the future, with either music composed after the issuing of the 1985 hymnal, music from other faiths, and those submitted as part of the process of creating the new hymnal.

The hymnbook (featuring 394 hymns and children's songs) will be published in English, French, Spanish, and Portuguese in late 2027. Additional languages will follow.

In February 2026, the church announced twelve new hymns added to the hymnal, noting that hymns "help teach the doctrine and principles of the gospel with power and clarity", as well as a focus on the Old Testament. Some hymns, such as "When I Am Baptized", received textual clarifications.

== New hymnal characteristics ==
The new hymnal will feature 394 hymns & children's songs. It will also include revisions of old songs to make them more globally relevant, clarify doctrine, replace outdated language, and ensure that the lyrics and musical styles are more relevant.

National hymns and anthems, such as "The Star-Spangled Banner" and "God Save the King", will not be included in the new hymnal as the hymns will be the same globally, but congregations may add them to the books locally.

== Organization ==
As of February 2025, hymns released have been given temporary numbers and separated into thematic groups. Hymns begin at #1001 to avoid confusion with the current hymnal. When the hymnal is officially released, the numbers will be changed.

1001–1072: Sabbath and Weekday
Number	Hymn	Words	Music	Notes
1001	"Come, Thou Fount of Every Blessing"	Robert Robinson	Wyeth's Repository	
1002	"When the Savior Comes Again"	Lane Johnson		
1003	"It Is Well with My Soul"	Horatio Spafford	Philip Bliss	
1004	"I Will Walk with Jesus"	Stephen P. Schank		
1005	"His Eye Is on the Sparrow"	Civilla D. Martin	Charles H. Gabriel	
1006	"Think a Sacred Song"	Marlene Merkling		
1007	"As Bread Is Broken"	Stephen A. Reynolds		
1008	"Bread of Life, Living Water"	Annette W. Dickman		
1009	"Gethsemane"	Melanie M. Hoffman		
1010	"Amazing Grace"	John Newton	American folk	
1011	"Holding Hands Around the World"	Janice Kapp Perry		
1012	"Anytime, Anywhere"	Angie Killian		
1013	"God's Gracious Love"	Caroline V. Sandell-Berg	Oscar Ahnfelt	Trans: Andrew L. Skoog
1014	"My Shepherd Will Supply My Need"	Isaac Watts	American folk	
1015	"Oh, the Deep, Deep Love of Jesus"	Samuel Trevor Francis	Stephen M. Jones	
1016	"Behold the Wounds in Jesus' Hands"	John V. Pearson	David R. Naylor	
1017	"This Is the Christ"	James E. Faust & Jan Underwood Pinborough	Michael Finlinson Moody	
1018	"Come, Lord Jesus"	Savior of the World	David A. Zabriskie	
1019	"To Love like Thee"	Heather D. Zurcher		
1020	"Softly and Tenderly Jesus Is Calling"	Will L. Thompson		
1021	"I Know That My Savior Loves Me"	Derena Bell, Tami Jeppson Creamer	Tami Jeppson Creamer	
1022	"Faith in Every Footstep"	K. Newell Dayley		
1023	"Standing on the Promises"	R. Kelso Carter	R. Kelso Carter	
1024	"I Have Faith in the Lord Jesus Christ"	Janice Kapp Perry		
1025	"Take My Heart and Let It Be Consecrated"	Frances Ridley Havergal	César Malan	
1026	"Holy Places"	Sherrie Manwill Boren	Katherine Wright	
1027	"Welcome Home"	Andrea Christensen Brett		
1028	"This Little Light of Mine"	African-American spiritual		
1029	"I Can't Count Them All"	Caroline V. Sandell-Berg	Albert Lindström	
1030	"Close as a Quiet Prayer"	Sally DeFord		
1031	"Come, Hear the Word the Lord Has Spoken"	Frans Heijdemann		
1032	"Look unto Christ"	Sherrie Manwill Boren		
1033	"Oh, How Great Is Our Joy"	Andrés C. González	Joseph Philbrick Webster	
1034	"I'm a Pioneer Too"	Jan Underwood Pinborough	Michael Finlinson Moody	
1035	"As I Keep the Sabbath Day"	Nathan P. Howe		
1036	"Read the Book of Mormon and Pray"	Teresa Toone Barlow		
1037	"I'm Gonna Live So God Can Use Me"	African-American spiritual		
1038	"The Lord's My Shepherd"	Based on Psalm 23	James Leith Macbeth Bain	
1039	"Because"	Shawna B. Edwards		
1040	"His Voice as the Sound"	Joseph Swain	American folk; A Supplement to the Kentucky Harmony	
1041	"O Lord, Who Gave Thy Life for Me"	Alice Warner Johnson		
1042	"Thou Gracious God, Whose Mercy Lends"	Oliver Wendell Holmes Sr.	English folk tune	
1043	"Help Us Remember"	Wendy Lynn Platt	John G. Riley	
1044	"How Did The Savior Minister"	Merrijane Rice	Jennette Jay Booth	
1045	"Jesus Is the Way"	Tēvita Tuliakiono		
1046	"Can You Count the Stars in Heaven?"	Wilhelm Hey	German folk	Trans. Elmer L. Jorgenson from Weißt du, wie viel Sternlein stehen
1047	"He Cares for Me"	Kenneth S. Schank		
1048	"Our Prayer to Thee"	Russell M. Nelson	Joseph Parry	Arr. Mack Wilberg
1049	"Joseph Prayed in Faith"	Rebecca Martin		
1050	"Stand by Me"	Charles Albert Tindley		
1051	"This Day Is a Good Day, Lord"	J. Frederic Voros Jr.		
1052	"Joyfully Bound"	Anna M. Molgard	Rachel P. Mohlman; Anna M. Molgard	
1053	"My Covenants"	Hanna Josephine Saffer		
1054	"When I Am Baptized"	Nita Dale Milner		
1055	"The Power of the Holy Ghost"	Delys Waite Snyder		
1056	"Elijah and the Still, Small Voice"	Alan L. Patterson		
1057	"Jesus Is My Shepherd"	Tammy Simister Robinson		
1058	"My Song in the Night"	Anon.; inspired by a text by Joseph Swain; Frederick Graves	American folk	
1059	"This Is My Father's World"	Maltbie D. Babcock		Arr. Edward Shippen Barnes
1060	"Build an Ark"	Marianne Porter		
1061	"Love Will Bless Our Home"	Marvin K. Gardner	Ryan T. Murphy	
1062	"Lord, Accept Our Humble Fast"	Nathan P. Howe		
1063	"Peace, Peace, Be Still"	Sally DeFord	Kathrine Wright	
1064	"Great Is Thy Faithfulness"	Thomas Chisholm	William M. Runyan	
1065	"Isaiah Said"	Penelope Moody Allen	Kenneth Jones	
1066	"Fight the Good Fight"	John S. B. Monsell	Stephen M. Jones	
1067	"It's Joyful to Live the Gospel"	Matthew J. Neeley		
1068	"To God Be the Glory"	Fanny Crosby	William Howard Doane	
1069	"Speak to Us, Lord"	Gertrude M. Watson	Lex de Azevedo	Text adapted by J. Scott Miller
1070	"The Miracle"	Shawna Belt Edwards		
1071	"What God Calls Us To"	J. Frederic Voros Jr.	Catherine A. Tibbitts	
1072	"When I Survey the Wondrous Cross"	Isaac Watts	Lowell Mason	

1201–1210: Easter and Christmas
Number	Hymn	Words	Music	Notes
1201	"Hail the Day that Sees Him Rise"	Charles Wesley	Robert Williams	
1202	"He Is Born, the Divine Christ Child"	Nouveaux Cantiques	French carol	
1203	"What Child Is This?"	William Chatterton Dix	English Melody	
1204	"Star Bright"	Lorin F. Wheelwright		
1205	"Let Easter Anthems Ring"	Larry Hiller	George Elvey	
1206	"Were You There?"	African-American spiritual		
1207	"Still, Still, Still"	Austrian carol		
1208	"Go Tell It on the Mountain"	African-American spiritual		
1209	"Little Baby in a Manger"	Traci Law		
1210	"Long Ago, Within a Garden"	R. Devan Jensen	Daniel Lyman Carter	
