= Stephen Roth =

Stephen Roth may refer to:

- Stephen John Roth (1908–1974), American judge in Michigan
- Stephen L. Roth, American judge in Utah
