= Hymns of the Church of Jesus Christ of Latter-day Saints =

Hymns of The Church of Jesus Christ of Latter-day Saints may refer to:

- The Church of Jesus Christ of Latter-day Saints hymns, hymns sung at worship services of the LDS Church
- Hymns of The Church of Jesus Christ of Latter-day Saints (1985 book), the hymnal currently used in the LDS Church
