= ¿Por qué somos? =

Mormon hymn written by Edmund W. Richardson

The hymn ¿Por qué somos? (also "Why Are We" or "Eternal Life") by Edmund W. Richardson is Mormon hymn that was initially published in the 1912 edition of Himnos de Sion, the Spanish-language hymnbook of The Church of Jesus Christ of Latter-day Saints. It is one of the three hymns originally written in Spanish that are included in the 1992 Spanish hymnal. The hymn has also been included in the Portuguese hymnal as “De que rumo vêm os homens”, though it is not included in the current hymnbook in that language. The original publication indicated that it should be sung to the tune of hymn 50 in Songs of Zion, which was ELIZA by Joseph J. Daynes (the tune for “Lord, Accept Our True Devotion” in the English LDS Hymnal).

== Mexican Mission hymns ==
Except for one privately published hymnal, the earliest Spanish hymnals used in The Church of Jesus Christ of Latter-day Saints were all produced by the Mexico Mission. The three major editions published between 1907 and 1927 were collections of texts, primarily translations from the English hymnals or Protestant hymnbooks. There were several texts unique to these hymnals, however, that were written in Spanish by missionaries, Anglo-American colonists in Mexico, and native Mexican Latter-day Saints. The hymnbook with the highest percentage of original Spanish texts was the 1912 edition, which included 23 hymns written in Spanish by Latter-day Saints.

The 1992 Spanish translation of the current English hymnbook retained only three out of the twenty-three original Spanish texts published in the 1912 Spanish hymnal: “¿Por qué somos?” by Edmund W. Richardson, “Despedida” or “Placentero nos es trabajar” by Andrés C. González, and “La voz, ya, del eterno” or “¡La Proclamación!” by José V. Estrada G. As a side note, there are also a few hymns included in the 1992 Himnos that carried over from previous English hymnals, but those hymns were all originally written in English.

== Writing the hymn ==
The author, Edmund Wilford Richardson (1884 – 1974), was the most prolific author of original Spanish hymns in the Mexican Mission hymnals, authoring 10 out of the 23 original hymns in the 1912 edition. He was born to Sarah Louisa Adams and Charles E. Richardson in Wilford, Arizona, in 1844. The family moved to Colonia Diaz in northern Mexico in 1888. His father was a blacksmith, carpenter, and teacher in the community and went on to study medicine and Mexican law. Edmund W. went on to serve in the Mexican Mission from September 14, 1910, to May 7, 1913.

Given that Richardson was serving as a missionary in the Mexican Mission when the 1912 edition of the hymnal was printed, he likely wrote this hymn during his time as a missionary.

== Lyrics ==
1912 Himnos de Sion

1. ¿Hacia dónde van los hombres,
Y aquí de dónde son?
¿Quién los puso en el mundo,
Y aquí, por qué están?
Yo contesto: Dios el Padre,
E que hizo todo ser,
Púsolos aquí en carne,
A obrar su perfección.

2. Aunque no se perfeccionen,
Se espera progresión;
El que poco, pues, progrese,
Poco es su galardón.
Para él que no progrese,
Hay mayor condenación;
El que peque prefiriendo,
Para tal, no hay perdón.

3. Que cayera nuestro padre
Por el fruto del Edén,
Esto Dioses decretaron,
Todo fué por nuestro bien;
Y que Cristo expiara,
Fué también Eterno Plan,
Que existe desde antes
Que el mundo y Adam.

4. Más que lucros mundanales,
Yo prefiero salvación;
Para ella se requiere
Obras, fe, abnegación.
Ya después aprenderemos
Más del gran Eterno Plan;
Esta vida, finalmente,
Vida es, de probación.

English Translation

1. Where do we go after dying?
Where did we come from at birth?
Who put people on this planet?
Why are we here on this earth?
This I answer: God the Father,
Author of all things throughout.
He put people on this planet,
Our perfection to work out.

2. Even if we aren't perfected,
Progress is expected here;
Those who make but little progress,
Their reward will be austere.
Then for those who do not progress
There will come severe reproof:
For the one who's not repentant,
God's forgiveness is aloof.

3. Eve and Adam fell in Eden,
For the fruit of that blessed wood:
This was planned above in heaven;
Everything was for our good.
The Atonement of our Savior
Also was part of that plan
That the Godhead once presented,
Long before this life began.

4. More than gaining worldly lucre,
Exaltation I desire.
Righteous works and self-denial
For this blessing They require.
In the future, we will learn more:
The Plan of Salvation known;
Ultimately, mortal life is
A probation for a throne.

== See also ==
- Hymns in the Church of Jesus Christ of Latter-day Saints
- Latter Day Saint poetry
- Hymns of the Church of Jesus Christ of Latter-day Saints (1985 book)
- Placentero nos es trabajar (LDS Hymn)
