= Judith Billings =

American judge (1943–2025)

Judith M. Billings
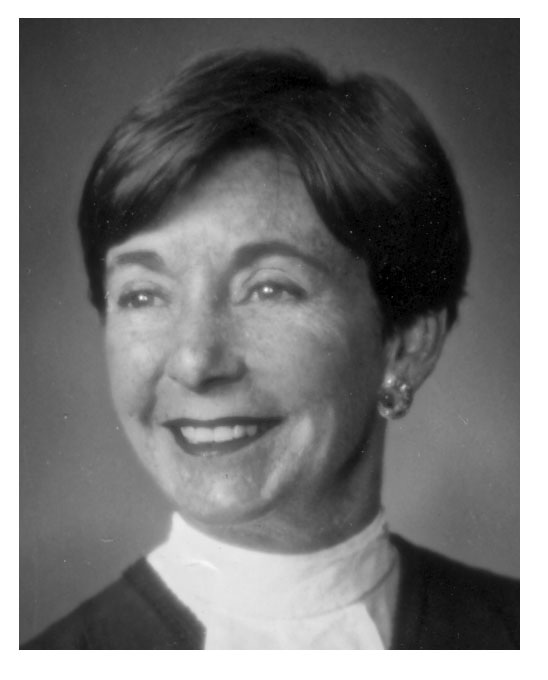

Judge of the Utah Court of Appeals
- In office January 17, 1987 – December 31, 2008
- Appointed by: Norman H. Bangerter
- Succeeded by: J. Frederic Voros, Jr.

Personal details
- Born: July 1943 Salt Lake City, Utah, U.S.
- Died: April 2, 2025 (aged 81)
- Education: University of Utah (BA); University of Utah (JD); University of Virginia (LLM)

Judith M. Billings (July 1943 – April 2, 2025) was an American judge for the Utah Court of Appeals from 1987 to 2008 and was a adjunct professor for the S.J. Quinney College of Law at the University of Utah. In addition, she still worked as an active senior judge, mediator, arbitrator and a faculty member of the National Judicial College. She died April 2, 2025, at the age of 81.

== Early life and education ==
Born and raised in Utah, Billings earned a B.A. in English from The University of Utah in 1965. Billings graduated magna cum laude and was a member of Phi Beta Kappa. Following her undergraduate education at the University of Utah Billings obtained a J.D. from the S.J. Quinney College of Law at the University of Utah in 1977. In law school she was an Associate Editor of Law Review and a member of the Order of the Coif. Billings earned her L.L.M. at University of Virginia Law School in 1990.

== Professional career ==
After completion of law school, Billings was admitted to the Utah State Bar and Utah Federal Bar in 1977 and, eventually, the Supreme Court of the United States in 1989. Her first job as a lawyer was as a trial lawyer and partner with Ray, Quinney & Nebeker, where she worked from 1976 to 1982. She litigated commercial, banking, corporate, employment, construction, products liability, securities and insurance cases in state and federal courts. Cases for the Utah Court of Appeals varied from civil, criminal, administrative and domestic cases. Throughout her career, Billings has also served as a Chair of the Appellate Judges Conference of the American Bar Association and President of the National Association of Women Judges. Latterly, Billings taught about the Judicial Process (see: procedural law) at The University of Utah's S.J. Quinney College of Law while serving as a current trustee of Westminster College, member of the Board of Directors of the Park City Historical Society and Museum, member of the National Judicial College, active senior judge, mediator, arbitrator.

== Judicial career ==
From 1981 to 1986, she served as a District Court Judge in the Third Judicial District of Utah where she presided over complex civil, criminal bench and jury trials. When the Utah Court of Appeals was established on January 31, 1987, Billings was asked by then-Governor Bangerter to serve as one of the court's inaugural judges until she retired from the court on December 31, 2008.

== Awards and honors ==
In 1990, Judge Billings was named Utah Woman Lawyer of the year. In 1993 she received the Distinguished Alumni Award of the University of Utah College of Humanities. In 1995, she received the Distinguished Alumni Award from the S.J. Quinney College of Law at the University of Utah.

== Selected Billings Rulings ==
Below is a list of some of Billings' rulings throughout her career:

=== K.A.M. v. State, 2004 Ut. Ct. App 48 (2004) ===
In K.A.M. vs. State Judges; Billings, Greenwood and Orme reaffirmed the ruling of the Juvenile Court that K.A.M.s name will remain in the licensing database maintained by the Department of Child and Family Services (DFCS)

The case involved a parent that spanked their child and left a visible mark of the disciplinary action for more than 24 hours. The petitioner argued that since corporal punishment was legal that any restrictions on that punishment infringes upon "parental rights." The court affirmed the ruling of the Juvenile Court which used the following standard set by the DFCS: "whether, by clear and convincing evidence, a child has 'suffered or been threatened with nonaccidental physical or mental harm."

=== Boyer v. Boyer, 2011 UT App. (2011) ===
The Court of Appeals, in an opinion authored by Billings, affirmed the trial court's award of diminishing monthly alimony for a time period less than the length of the marriage as well as affirming a property division where there were certain assets that were not divided equally. Wife appealed the trial court's ruling that certain specific assets that were not divided equally. In affirming, the Court of Appeals noted that the goal of a property division is to receive a fair result between the parties. In awarding property, a court should determine which property is marital along with its value. The court should then divide the property equally unless it finds exceptional circumstances to do otherwise. Wife asserted that the trial court erred because it failed to divide certain marital property equally. The Court of Appeals held that a trial court is not required to divide each piece of property equally, but it can look to the marital estate in its entirety and divide the entire estate in a manner that best facilitates a clean break between the parties. The Court noted that husband had assumed all the marital deb and that the trial court made a specific finding that considering the debt, the property division was equitable. Wife also appealed her alimony award on two grounds: first that the trial court erred by not adjusting alimony (presumably an upward adjustment) based upon husband's fault and second that the court erred by awarding her diminishing alimony for a time less than the length of alimony. The Court of Appeals rejected wife's claim regarding fault by merely pointing out that the statute sets forth that a trial court may consider fault but is not required to consider fault. The Court of Appeals then considered the diminishing alimony award under a two part analysis: was it a prospective change to a traditional alimony award or was it rehabilitative alimony? The Court noted that making future adjustments to a traditional alimony award is generally only justified when the anticipated event is certain, such as reductions in child support increasing alimony by a similar sum. The Court indicated that if the event is not certain then the trial court would be in a better position to consider the event at the time of the event. Rehabilitative alimony on the other hand is designed to assist the recipient spouse in the transition to self-sufficiency. The Court remanded to the trial court to clarify whether it had made future adjustments to a traditional alimony award or awarded rehabilitative alimony and required the trial court to clarify the time of the alimony given that there was a mathematical error in the trial court's order.
