= Lorena (song) =

American folk song

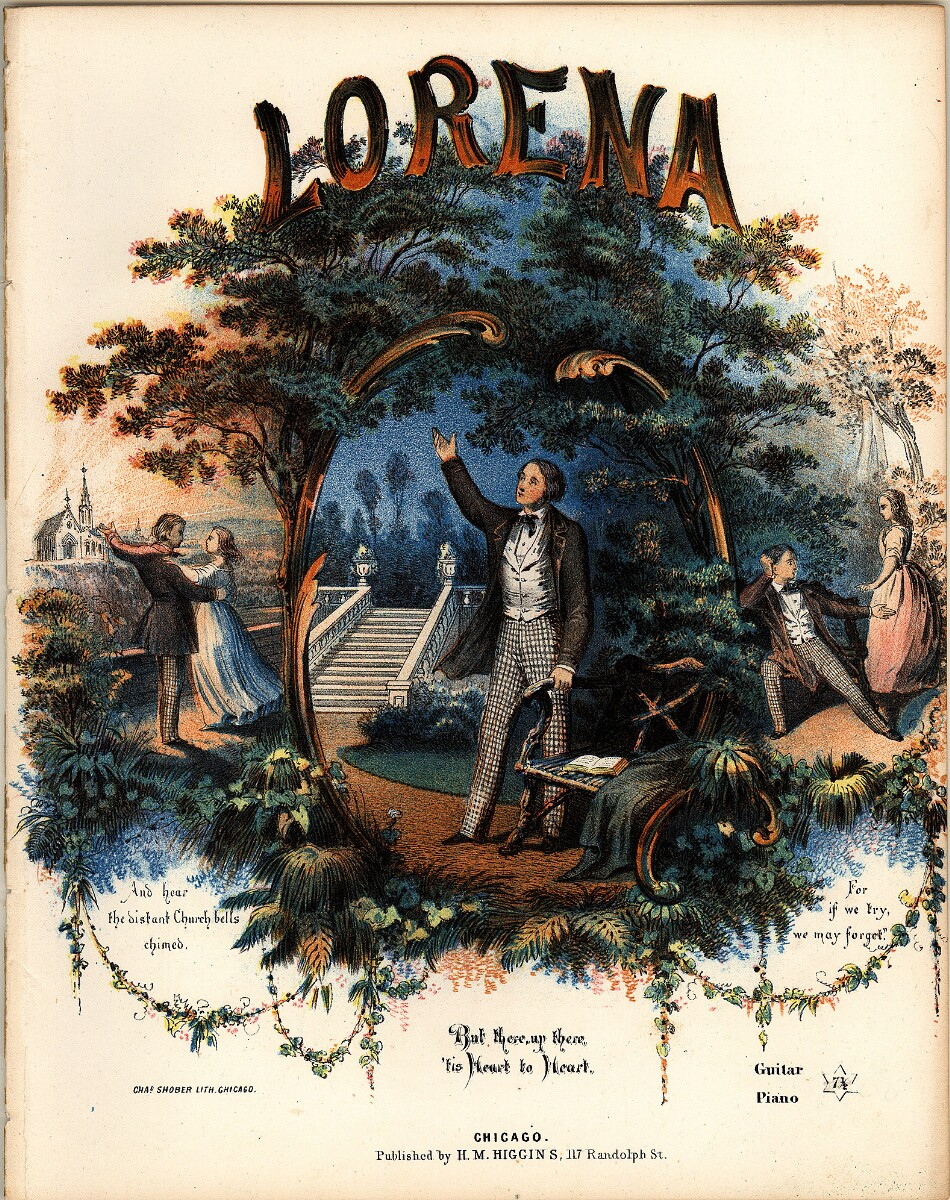

Song
- Written: 1856
- Published: 1857
- Composer: Joseph Philbrick Webster
- Lyricist: Henry D. L. Webster

"Lorena" is an American antebellum song with Ohio origins. The lyrics were written in 1856 by Rev. Henry D. L. Webster, after a broken engagement. He wrote a long poem about his fiancée Ella Blocksom, but changed her name at first to "Bertha" and later to "Lorena", perhaps an adaptation of "Lenore" from Edgar Allan Poe's poem "The Raven." Henry Webster's friend Joseph Philbrick Webster wrote the music, and the song was first published in Chicago in 1857. It became a favorite of soldiers of both sides during the American Civil War. Members of the Western Writers of America chose it as one of the Top 100 Western songs of all time.

== History ==
"Lorena" was based on the lyricist's love for a Zanesville, Ohio girl named Ella Blocksom.

Her parents being deceased, Miss Blocksom lived with her brother-in-law and sister, Mr. and Mrs. Henry Blandy. The family attended the Universalist Church in Zanesville where the Rev. Henry DeLafayette Webster was the minister. Miss Blocksom caught the eye of the young preacher and his feelings became more than just pastoral. Henry Blandy and his brother Fred were co-owners of the Blandy foundry in Zanesville. As a wealthy and prominent member of the community he could not see his sister-in-law becoming romantically attached to a poor preacher and so stepped in to put an end to the relationship. Miss Blocksom told Webster that they must part and gave him a letter containing the line "If we try, we may forget," which found its way into the song. The brokenhearted Mr. Webster resigned his pastorate and left Zanesville. In 1856, Webster met Joseph P. Webster (who later composed the music of "[In the] Sweet By-and-By"). J. P. Webster was looking for lyrics to a song he was writing and Henry Webster responded by writing a ballad about his lost love, changing her name from Ella to Bertha. The composer required a three-syllable name and Henry Webster changed the name again, this time to Lorena. The song was published in 1857 by Higgins Brothers of Chicago and soon was known across America.

In 1854 Martha Ella Blocksom married William Wartenbee Johnson, Ohio Supreme Court justice from 1879 to 1886. She died in 1917 and is buried at Woodland Cemetery in Ironton, Ohio.

Henry D.L. Webster also married, fathered four children, and eventually became the minister of a Unitarian church in Chicago, Illinois. He died in 1896, and is buried in Chicago.

During the American Civil War, soldiers on both sides of the conflict thought of their wives and girlfriends back home when they heard the song "Lorena". One Confederate officer even attributed the South's defeat to the song. He reasoned that upon hearing the mournful ballad the soldiers grew so homesick that they lost their effectiveness as a fighting force.

After their defeat at the Battle of Atlanta, Confederate General John Hood and his men somberly sang the song while leaving the city.

== Lyrics ==
Oh, the years creep slowly by, Lorena,
The snow is on the ground again.
The sun's low down the sky, Lorena,
The frost gleams where the flow'rs have been.
But the heart beats on as warmly now,
As when the summer days were nigh.
Oh, the sun can never dip so low
A-down affection's cloudless sky.

A hundred months have passed, Lorena,
Since last I held that hand in mine,
And felt the pulse beat fast, Lorena,
Though mine beat faster far than thine.
A hundred months, 'twas flowery May,
When up the hilly slope we climbed,
To watch the dying of the day,
And hear the distant church bells chime.

We loved each other then, Lorena,
Far more than we ever dared to tell;
And what we might have been, Lorena,
Had but our loving prospered well --
But then, 'tis past, the years are gone,
I'll not call up their shadowy forms;
I'll say to them, "Lost years, sleep on!
Sleep on! nor heed life's pelting storms."

The story of that past, Lorena,
Alas! I care not to repeat,
The hopes that could not last, Lorena,
They lived, but only lived to cheat.
I would not cause e'en one regret
To rankle in your bosom now;
For "if we try we may forget,"
Were words of thine long years ago.

Yes, these were words of thine, Lorena,
They burn within my memory yet;
They touched some tender chords, Lorena,
Which thrill and tremble with regret.
'Twas not thy woman's heart that spoke;
Thy heart was always true to me:
A duty, stern and pressing, broke
The tie which linked my soul with thee.

It matters little now, Lorena,
The past is in the eternal past;
Our heads will soon lie low, Lorena,
Life's tide is ebbing out so fast.
There is a Future! O, thank God!
Of life this is so small a part!
'Tis dust to dust beneath the sod;
But there, up there, 'tis heart to heart.

== Usage in more recent media ==
=== Film ===
An instrumental version appears in the film Gone With The Wind (1939) when Scarlett O'Hara is manning the stall at the charity dance in her mourning outfit and Rhett Butler pursues her while she is trying to avoid him.

The tune occurs in two John Ford films. The melody of "Lorena" was used by composer Max Steiner to represent homecoming in various scenes in the 1956 western The Searchers. Composer David Buttolph used the melody to represent bittersweet parting at the end of the 1959 western The Horse Soldiers. The theme is also heard in the western The Last Hunt (1956).

In the 1989 miniseries Lonesome Dove the tune is used in the background as Gus McCrae lies dying – ostensibly played on a whorehouse piano.

The tune of the song is used in the saloon scene near the beginning of the 2012 film Cowboys & Aliens, played on fiddle. The saloon keeper tells the fiddler that it is too melancholy and asks him to play a different tune. Near the end of the movie, the piano player plays an upbeat version of the tune, and the crowd celebrates their victory over the aliens by dancing to it.

The tune was featured in the 2017 Colin Farrell-Nicole Kidman film, The Beguiled.

=== Television ===
The tune appeared as harmonica background music in the TV series Wagon Train, episode "The Clementine Jones Story" (1961), with Ann Blyth (as Clementine Jones) also sang s version of the song.

The melody was featured prominently in several episodes of the 1990 Ken Burns documentary Civil War, and it was referred to as a tune which both Federal and Confederate soldiers particularly loved.

The song can be heard in one subplot-line of the television series So Weird season 1 episode 4 - "Sacrifice" (1999).

It was played in the 2006 season one finale of HBO’s Big Love.

It used as background music in the 2016 - 2017 PBS Civil War drama series Mercy Street, in a scene in which the characters Dr. Jedediah Foster (Josh Radnor) and Nurse Anne Hastings (Tara Summers) visit a Union encampment to treat an ill general.

=== Video games ===
In the 2018 western-themed video game Red Dead Redemption 2, the character Karen Jones can be heard singing the song at a campfire.

== Recordings ==
- The earliest known recording of "Lorena" was by the Metropolitan Quartet (with orchestra) in 1914, on Edison Blue Amberol:2400, the group recording numerous songs for Thomas Edison's National Phonograph Company. The original recording (pre-vinyl) taken from The Edison Phonograph Monthly, can be heard at the UCSB Audio Cylinder Archive
- "Lorena" was recorded in 1961 by Tennessee Ernie Ford for his album Tennessee Ernie Ford Sings Civil War Songs of the South, released in conjunction with the centennial of the war.
- It was recorded by The Mormon Tabernacle Choir in 1961 and 1962.*A version by Johnny Cash was included on the compilation album Johnny Cash – 1970, released in Australia in 1969.
- An instrumental version was recorded and released by The Seldom Scene in 1986 album, recorded live at The Kennedy Center, Washington, DC
- The instrumental version by Molly Mason, Jay Ungar, and Matt Glaser used in Ken Burns' 1990 Civil War documentary is available on the series' accompanying soundtrack album.
- In a 1991 album release titled "Songs of the Civil War", John Hartford sang the vocal and played banjo, accompanied by mandolin and guitar players.
- A version of the song by bluegrass musician Del McCoury was included in the 2013 Civil War themed compilation album Divided & United.
- A version was released Jan. 1st, 2004 on the album Wake Up Darlin’ Corey recorded by Art stamper. Featuring Harry Bickel, and Doc Hamilton, and Tim O’Brien. The vocals are sung by Tim O’Brien.

== See also ==
- Katyusha
- Erika

== Sources ==
- The American Bicentennial Songbook, Vol. 1 (1770-1870s). William A. Ward, New York, NY, 1975, p. 202.
- Zanesville Times Recorder, May 12, 2007, Zanesville, Ohio.
