= Placentero nos es trabajar =

Mormon hymn written by Andrés González

"Placentero nos es trabajar" (also "Despedida" or "Oh, How Great Is Our Joy") is a popular Latter-day Saint hymn written by Mormon missionary Andrés C. González during the Mexican Revolution.

== Early LDS spanish hymnals ==
The earliest Spanish hymnals used in The Church of Jesus Christ of Latter-day Saints were produced by the Mexico Mission. The three major editions of the Spanish hymnal were published between 1907 and 1927, comprising collections of texts primarily translated from English hymnals or Protestant hymnbooks. There were several texts unique to these hymnals, however, that were written in Spanish by missionaries, Anglo-American colonists in Mexico, and native Mexican Latter-day Saints. The 1912 edition included 23 hymns written in Spanish by Latter-day Saints.

The 1992 Spanish translation of the current English hymnbook has retained only three out of the twenty-three original Spanish texts published in the 1912 Spanish hymnal: "¿Por qué somos?" by Edmund W. Richardson, "Despedida" or "Placentero nos es trabajar" by Andrés C. González, and "La Voz, ya, del eterno" or "¡La Proclamación!" by José V. Estrada G

== Writing the hymn ==
The 1907 Spanish-language hymnal of the Church of Jesus Christ of Latter-day Saints (LDS Church) contained a similar song to "In the Sweet By-and-By", and was set to the same tune modified by adding to all parts the notes of the traditional first response in the call-and-response division of the refrain. This hymn was copied with permission from the American Tract Society's Himnos evangélicos.

During the era of the Mexican Revolution, Andrés C. Gonzalez, an early LDS Church missionary in Mexico, sang "Hay un mundo feliz más allá" in public and was arrested for "stealing" the Protestants' song. While incarcerated, he rewrote the lyrics, which appeased the police. This revised version appears in place of the original in every iteration of the church's hymnal from 1912 on. It was titled "Despedida" until the 1992 version of the hymnal, when it changed to match the first line: "Placentero nos es trabajar".

== Current use ==
The results of an extensive survey performed in 2017 by Samuel Bradshaw at SingPraises.net indicated that "How Pleasing It Is to Work" was the hymn to be sung most often in sacrament meetings that were written by a Latter-day Saint in a language other than English and not included in the 1985 English hymnal. The hymn was also included in other Latter-day Saint hymnbooks, such as the 2012 Qʼeqchiʼ (Mayan) hymnal as "Sa naqil lix yalbʼal li qaqʼe".

As of June 2025, the hymn was included in Hymns—for Home and Church as "Oh, How Great Is Our Joy" (Hymn 1033).

== Lyrics ==
1912 Spanish lyrics

Placentero nos es trabajar,
En la viña del gran Rey Jesús,
Y honroso nos es predicar,
A su pueblo, su ley y su luz,
Por su luz, por su luz,
Placentero nos es trabajar,
Por su luz, por su luz,
Moriremos con El sin pesar.

La palabra de Dios escuchad,
Con ahinco, lealtad y fervor;
Para siempre jamás recordad,
Su pureza, verdad y amor.
Con amor, con amor,
La palabra de Dios escuchad,
Con amor, con amor,
La bandera de Dios empuñad.

¡Oh hermanos, adiós, pues adiós!
El momento de ir vino ya;
Si guardamos la fe del gran Dios,
Nos veremos aún más allá.
Más allá, más allá,
¡Oh hermanos, adiós, pues adiós!
Más allá, más allá,
Moraremos con el vero Dios.

English translation

It is pleasant to work with the Lord
In the vineyard of Jesus, our king,
And an honor to preach his great word,
To his people, his law we will bring.
In his light, in his light,
It is pleasant to work with the Lord,
In his light, in his light,
We will die without guilt through his word.

Hear the word of our God unto you;
Come with fervor, great zeal and belief,
And forever remember anew,
The uprightness and love of our chief.
With God's love, with God's love,
Hear the word of our God unto you,
With God's love, with God's love,
Grasp the banner of God and be true.

Oh, dear brothers and sisters, farewell!
For the time we must leave has arrived;
If we stay in the faith and do well,
Past the veil we shall meet, there revived.
Past the veil, past the veil,
Oh, dear brothers and sisters, farewell!
Past the veil, past the veil,
With our God, we forever shall dwell.

== See also ==
- Mormon poetry
