= J. Frederic Voros Jr. =

American jurist, hymnist, and author

Judge of the Utah Court of Appeals
- In office December 17, 2009 – August 1, 2017
- Appointed by: Gary Herbert
- Preceded by: Judith Billings
- Succeeded by: Diana Hagen

J. Frederic Voros Jr. is an American jurist, hymnist, and author. He was a judge on the Utah Court of Appeals from 2009 to 2017.

== Education ==
Voros received a bachelor's degree in English from Brigham Young University (BYU) in 1975. He later obtained a Juris Doctor from BYU J. Reuben Clark Law School in 1978.

== Early legal career ==
Voros served as general counsel to Ricks College in Rexburg, Idaho from 1978 to 1981, leaving that position to clerk for Dallin H. Oaks of the Utah Supreme Court. He practiced commercial litigation with the Salt Lake City law firm of Prince, Yeates & Geldzahler, and later at the firm of Poole & Associates. Voros joined the Criminal Appeals Division of the Utah Attorney General's Office in 1991 and worked as Division Chief of the Criminal Appeals Division from 1999 until he was appointed to the bench in 2009. During his time in the Attorney General's Office, Voros taught appellate advocacy at the S.J. Quinney College of Law for ten years, receiving the Peter W. Billings Excellence in Teaching Award in 2005. He chaired the Supreme Court Advisory Committee on the Rules of Professional Responsibility and later served on the Supreme Court Advisory Committee on the Rules of Appellate Procedure for 24 years.

== Judicial career ==
Voros was appointed to the Utah Court of Appeals by Governor Gary Herbert in December 2009. His appointment came after the retirement of Judge Judith Billings, who had been on the court since its creation in 1987. Of his appointment, Herbert stated, "Fred brings a great deal of knowledge and experience to the Utah Court of Appeals. He has significant experience in all areas of the law, especially at the appellate level, and will be a good complement to the six sitting judges." Along with Utah Court of Appeals Judge Stephen L. Roth, Voros was named the 2017 Judge of the Year by the Utah State Bar. Voros retired from the bench on August 1, 2017.

=== Selected opinions ===
- Garfield County v. United States, 2017 UT 41, 424 P.3d 46 (dissenting opinion)
- State v. Scott, 2017 UT App 74, 397 P.3d 837 (concurring opinion)
- State v. MacNeill, 2017 UT App 48, 397 P.3d 626
- State v. McCullar, 2014 UT App 215, 335 P.3d 900
- State v. Wolf, 2014 UT 18, 319 P.3d 757
- State v. Ricks, 2013 UT App 238, 314 P.3d 1033
- Stone v. M&M Welding and Construction, Inc., 2013 UT App 233, 312 P.3d 934
- State v. Campos, 2013 UT App 213, 309 P.3d 1160
- Jones v. Jones, 2013 UT App 174, 307 P.3d 598
- Berrett v. Albertsons Inc., 2012 UT App 371, 293 P.3d 1108
- CDC Restoration & Construction, LC v. Tradesmen Contractors, LLC, 2012 UT App 60, 274 P.3d 317
- Fire Insurance Exchange v. Oltmanns, 2012 UT App 230, 285 P.3d 802 (concurring opinion)
- In re D.R.A., 2011 UT App 397, 266 P.3d 844
- Peterson v. Jackson, 2011 UT App 113, 253 P.3d 1096

== Post-judicial career ==
After retiring from the bench, Voros joined Zimmerman Booher, an appellate boutique in Salt Lake City. Voros represented League of Women Voters of Utah in its litigation against the Utah State Legislature in a pair of cases involving the scope of the legislature's authority to repeal citizen initiatives. The first case challenged the legislature's removal of a prohibition on partisan gerrymandering that had been enacted by a citizen initiative. The Utah Supreme Court upheld the people's right to alter or reform their state government by citizen initiative, ruling that the legislature can impair or repeal such reforms only in limited circumstances. The second case succeeded in voiding a ballot measure adopted by the legislature that, if adopted by voters, would have amended the Utah Constitution to give the legislature authority to repeal citizen initiatives. The Utah Supreme Court ruled that the constitutional amendment proposed by the legislature was not published to voters as required by the Utah Constitution and the ballot summary written by the legislature was not sufficiently clear to enable voters to express their will.

== Hymn writing ==
Voros founded the Western Hymn Writers Workshop in 2012 as a forum for hymnists in the Salt Lake City area to "sing, share, and workshop new hymns in the Christian and Mormon traditions." Many of Voros's hymns focus on themes of social justice and inclusion.

Voros and Catherine A. Tibbitts won the best anthem award in the 2014 church music submission competition of the Church of Jesus Christ of Latter-day Saints for the hymn, "This Day Is a Good Day, Lord." Voros wrote the text and music, and Tibbitts arranged the anthem. Voros and Tibbitts also won an award of merit in the anthem division of the 2017 church music submission competition for the hymn "What God Calls Us To." Voros wrote the text and Tibbitts wrote the music.

"This Day Is a Good Day, Lord" was included in the new hymnal "Hymns-For Home and Church" of The Church of Jesus Christ of Latter-day Saints. This hymn was performed by the Tabernacle Choir at Temple Square in the Sunday morning session of General Conference on October 5, 2025.

== Other writings ==
Voros wrote a children's book about the Salt Lake Temple of the Church of Jesus Christ of Latter-day Saints entitled, The Stones of the Temple, along with illustrator Kathleen B. Peterson. It was published in 1993 by Deseret Book Company.
