= Hymns in the Church of Jesus Christ of Latter-day Saints =

Hymns are an important part of the history and worship of the Church of Jesus Christ of Latter-day Saints (LDS Church).

The current hymnal used by the church is Hymns of the Church of Jesus Christ of Latter-day Saints.

== Use ==
Many meetings in the LDS Church, including sacrament meeting, begin and close with a congregational hymn. Additionally, hymns sung by a choir or the congregation may be included as an intermediate number. Families in the church are encouraged to sing hymns at home during Family Home Evening and other family gatherings.

== Early LDS Hymns ==
In July 1830, Joseph Smith stated he received a revelation from God for his wife, Emma, to select hymns for the Church of Christ:

And it shall be given thee, also, to make a selection of sacred hymns, as it shall be given thee, which is pleasing unto me, to be had in my church. For my soul delighteth in the song of the heart; yea, the song of the righteous is a prayer unto me, and it shall be answered with a blessing upon their heads.

Initially, it seems that this revelation was interpreted to mean that Emma Smith was commanded to select which hymns were appropriate for use in the worship services of Latter Day Saints and not necessarily to compile a hymnbook. Due in part to this ambiguity in the revelation and in part to persecutions and the constant uprooting of the church in those early days, she was not able to compile a hymnbook for several years. However, in the meantime, other followers continued to write, arrange, and collect hymns.

The first Latter Day Saint hymns were published by W. W. Phelps in June 1832 in Independence, Missouri. These appeared as text only (no music) in The Evening and the Morning Star, the church's semimonthly newspaper. Many of these lyrics were written by Phelps, while others were borrowed from various Protestant sources and edited by Phelps. The first of these hymns published by Phelps was "What Fair One Is This".

On July 20, 1833, a mob destroyed the church's printing office in Independence, and the publication of the Star was moved to Kirtland, Ohio – the headquarters of the church at that time. In December, 1834, The Evening and the Morning Star was replaced by a new publication: The Messenger and Advocate. Phelps continued to write and collect hymn texts, with assistance from Frederick G. Williams and others.

== 1835 hymnal ==
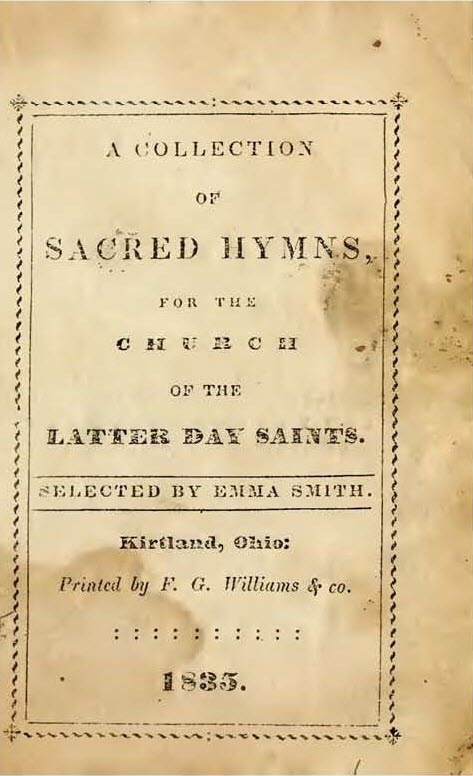
Title page of Collection of Sacred Hymns, 1835.

On September 14, 1835, at a meeting of the high council and the First Presidency at Kirtland, Emma Smith was again counseled to begin compiling a hymnbook in a joint effort with W. W. Phelps:

It was further decided that Sister Emma Smith proceed to make a selection of Sacred Hymns, according to the revelation; and that President W.W. Phelps be appointed to revise and arrange them for printing.

It appears that final publication of the new hymnal may have been pushed back into early 1836. The book is small – just 3" by 4 1/2" in size. An indication of the poverty of the church members in Kirtland at that time is that the hymnal was published in "sexadecimal" form, the least expensive publishing format for books in those days: sixteen pages were printed on both sides of a single sheet, which was then folded, cut, and sewn into the leather binding. Thus, the entire hymnbook could be printed on just four large sheets of paper. The completed hymnal contained ninety hymns, but only the words were included. As a result, today it is difficult to determine which tunes were used with many of the hymn texts.

Many of the hymns which had previously been published in The Evening and the Morning Star were inserted into the 1835 hymnal as a block, almost exactly in the same order as their earlier publication. Eleven of the hymns were also published in The Messenger and Advocate between December 1834 and January 1836:

Although the book was printed in 1836, it is still referred to as the "1835 hymnal" because of the publication date on the title page. The Kirtland printing of the hymnbook was probably very small – perhaps 500 copies at most. Today, original copies of this hymnbook are extremely rare; less than a dozen are known to exist. On December 5, 2006, an original 1835 hymnal was sold at Christie's Auction House in New York City for $273,600.

== Nauvoo hymnal ==
In Nauvoo, Illinois, in 1841, Emma Smith published an expanded version of the 1835 hymnal. The new hymnal contained 304 hymns (340 pages before the index), still in words-only format. Of these, 77 hymns had been included in the 1835 hymnbook. Many of the hymns included in the 1841 hymnal were more focused on grace, the blood of Christ, and the cross than other LDS hymn collections. Examples include "Amazing Grace", "Come, Thou Fount of Every Blessing", and "When I Survey the Wondrous Cross". After the succession crisis in the early Latter Day Saint movement following Joseph Smith's death, this hymnal was largely ignored in favor of the Manchester hymnal by those church members who followed the Quorum of the Twelve and moved to the Salt Lake Valley. In the Reorganized Church of Jesus Christ of Latter Day Saints, however, the opposite was true.

Editions of this hymnal are very rare – in 2007, Swann Galleries in New York auctioned one, along with a first edition of the Book of Mormon, for $180,000.

== Manchester hymnal ==
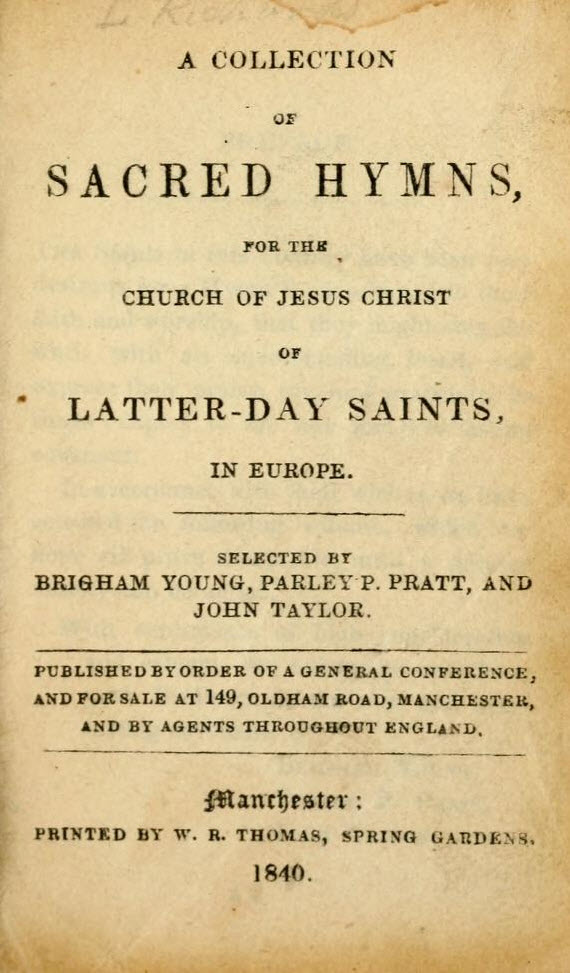
Title page of Collection of Sacred Hymns, 1840.

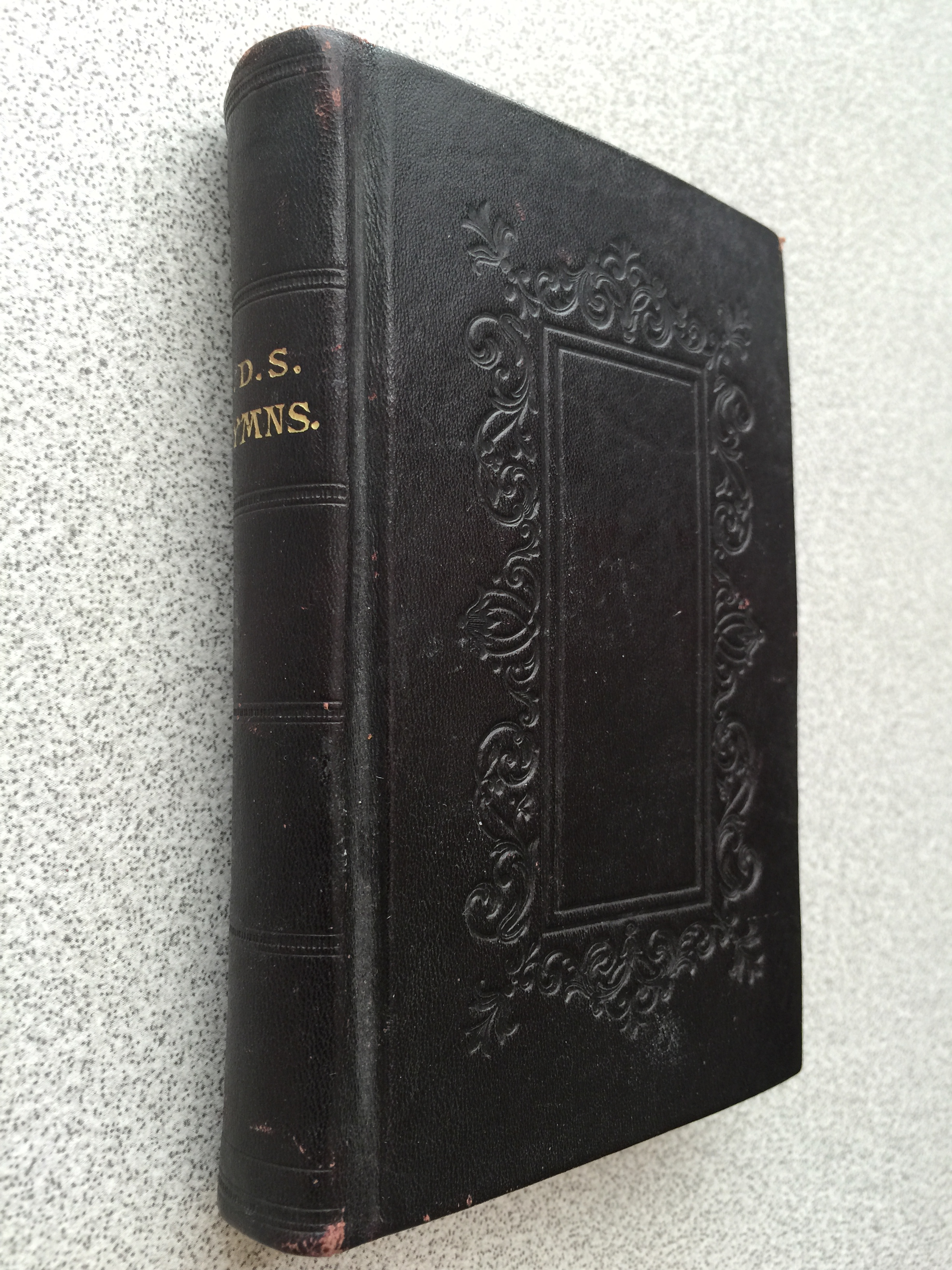
1891 LDS Hymns

In 1840, Brigham Young, Parley P. Pratt and John Taylor published a words-only hymnal for the church in Manchester, England, entitled A Collection of Sacred Hymns for the Church of Jesus Christ of Latter-day Saints in Europe. This "Manchester Hymnal", or "Small Hymnal", as it came to be called, was by far the longest-lived of all LDS hymnals, with 25 editions published between 1840 and 1912. Over the years, publication of this hymnal moved from Manchester to Liverpool, and finally to Salt Lake City. As more hymns were added, the book grew from 323 pages in 1840 to 456 pages in the 1905 edition. However, it was still a words-only hymnal; the tunes were sung from memory.

== Unofficial LDS hymnbooks with music ==
Early hymnbooks published by the LDS Church were text-only, with the tunes selected from memory or from tune books. Two unofficial hymnbooks in the 1840s and 1850s began the process of including music in LDS hymnals.

In 1844, G. B. Gardner and Jesse C. Little published a small hymnal in Bellows Falls, Vermont. This unofficial hymnbook is unique in early LDS history, because it was the first Latter-day Saint hymnal to include music with the words. This hymnal includes tunes for 18 of the 90 hymns found in the 1835 hymnbook. In addition, another 17 hymns were printed without music. Hymn number one in this hymnal, "The Spirit of God", may be the very first LDS hymn ever published with musical notation.

The second LDS hymnbook with music was John Tullidge's Latter Day Saints' Psalmody, published in 1857. This collection included music for LDS hymns such as "O My Father", "Praise to the Man" and "An Angel from on High", complete with piano accompaniment. Tullidge felt that many of the pairings of tune with hymns used in LDS meetings were poorly made and that the "freshness and vigor" of their spirit demanded better music for use in "praise for full grateful hearts."

The Latter-day Saints' Psalmody, 1889.

== The Latter-day Saints' Psalmody ==
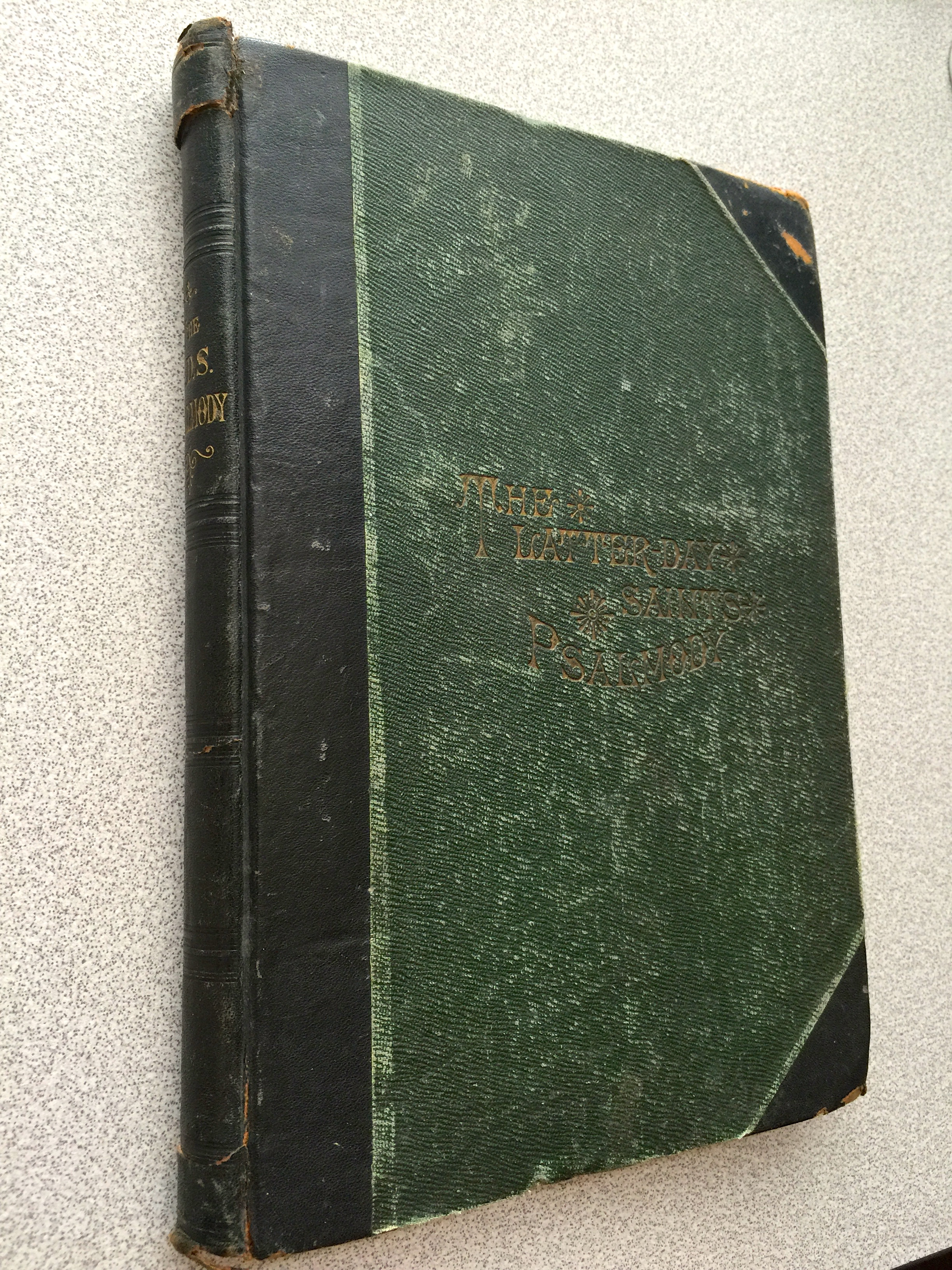
1896 The Latter-Day Saints Psalmody 2nd Edition

The first official LDS hymnbook to include music was The Latter-day Saints' Psalmody, published in 1889. At that time, many of the familiar LDS Church's hymns that are sung today were finally fixed in place – but not with the tunes that were sung back in 1835.

The Psalmody was a conscious effort by church leaders to develop a hymn style of their own. Budding composers in the church were encouraged to submit new tunes to fit the new and old lyrics. Many Latter-day Saint hymns that had been published in the previous decades in periodicals like the Utah Magazine, the Utah Musical Times, the Utah Musical Bouquet, and the Juvenile Instructor were included. Some tunes were also adopted from non-LDS sources, such as classical composers like Handel, Haydn, Mozart, Mendelssohn, and Rossini. Most of the old tunes were cast aside without ever having been committed to print, and the memory of them was quickly lost.

The Psalmody was intended to be a supplement to the "Manchester Hymnal". Each hymn in the Psalmody was cross-referenced by page number to the "Manchester Hymnal" and only used a few verses of the full hymn text.

In many respects, the Latter-day Saints' Psalmody represented a high-water mark for complexity in LDS hymnody. By today's standards many of the hymns are quite challenging, even for choirs, let alone congregational singing. They were very high-pitched, sometimes ascending above the staff to a high g' or a' in the soprano parts. The tenor parts were written on a separate staff above the soprano and alto lines, making accompaniment difficult. Ninety-five of them are still in use in the 1985 LDS hymnal, including these standards:

- "The Morning Breaks, the Shadows Flee"
- "High on the Mountain Top"
- "An Angel From on High"
- "Awake, Ye Saints of God, Awake"
- "We Thank Thee, O God, for a Prophet"
- "Come, Listen to a Prophet's Voice"

About half of the new hymn tunes that were composed for the Psalmody were written by members of the Church Music Committee, which included Evan Stephens, George Careless, Ebenezer Beesley, Joseph J. Daynes, and Thomas C. Griggs. These men were accomplished musicians, composers, and Mormon Tabernacle Choir conductors. Many of their Psalmody hymn tunes have a pronounced "instrumental" feel, as if they were more suited for organ performance than choir or congregational singing.

== 1908 Songs of Zion ==
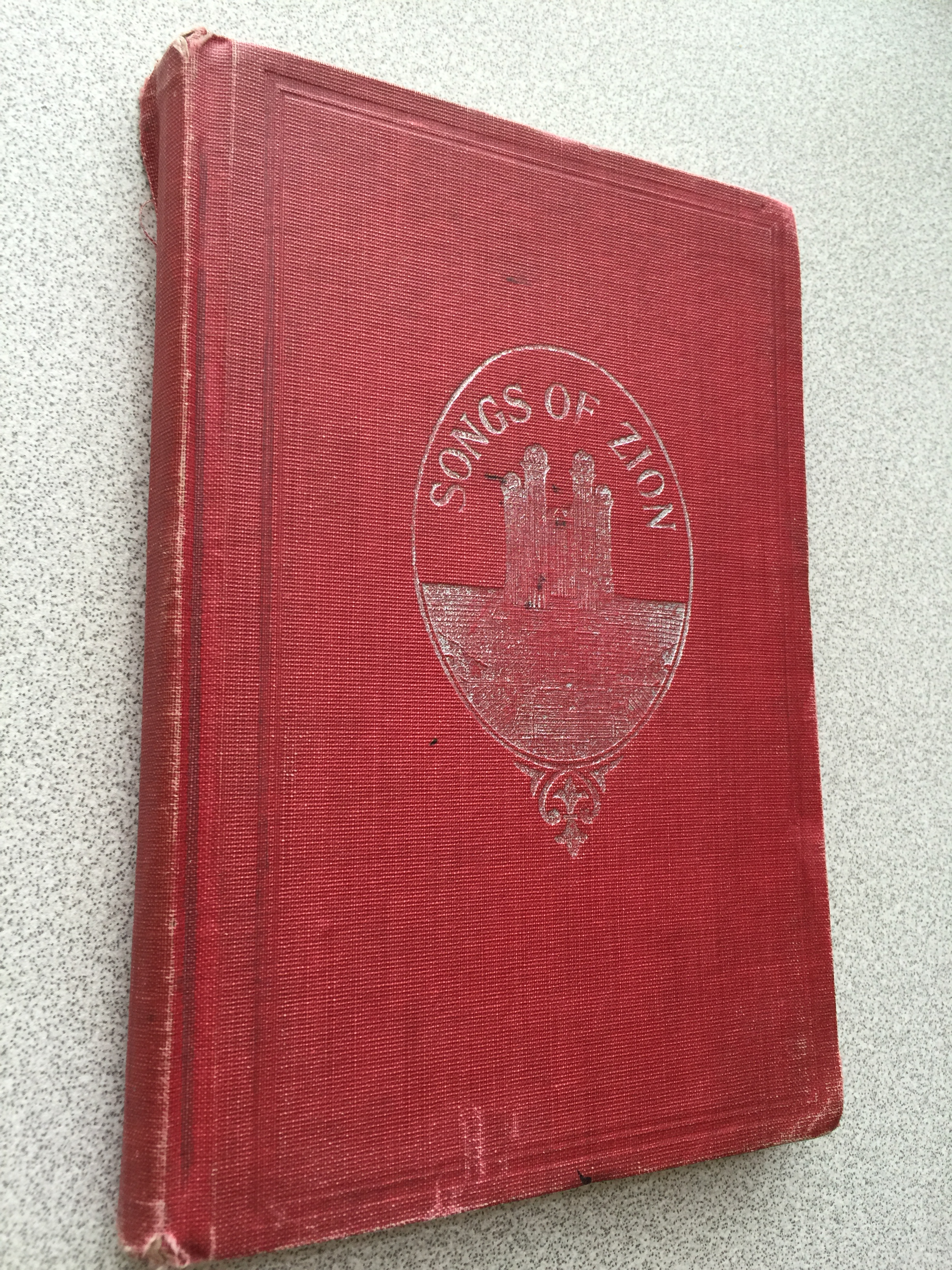
1918 "Songs of Zion"

In 1908, nine LDS Church mission presidents collaborated to produce a more simple hymnal with music and text. At the time, there were several songbooks and hymnbooks in use in Utah, including the Latter-day Saints' Psalmody, the Manchester Hymnal, the Deseret Sunday School Union Songbooks, Primary hymnbooks for children, etc. The intent of the mission presidents was to provide unity, prevent confusion and reduce the cost of stocking multiple hymnbooks by compiling favorite songs and hymns in one book. It was published in Chicago by the Northern States Mission and contained 246 gospel hymns such as "Do What Is Right," and "Put Your Shoulder to the Wheel." The 1918 edition contained 269 songs. It was the most popular and fastest selling LDS hymnbook up to that time. There were 12 printings between 1908 and 1925.

== 1909 Deseret Sunday School Songs ==
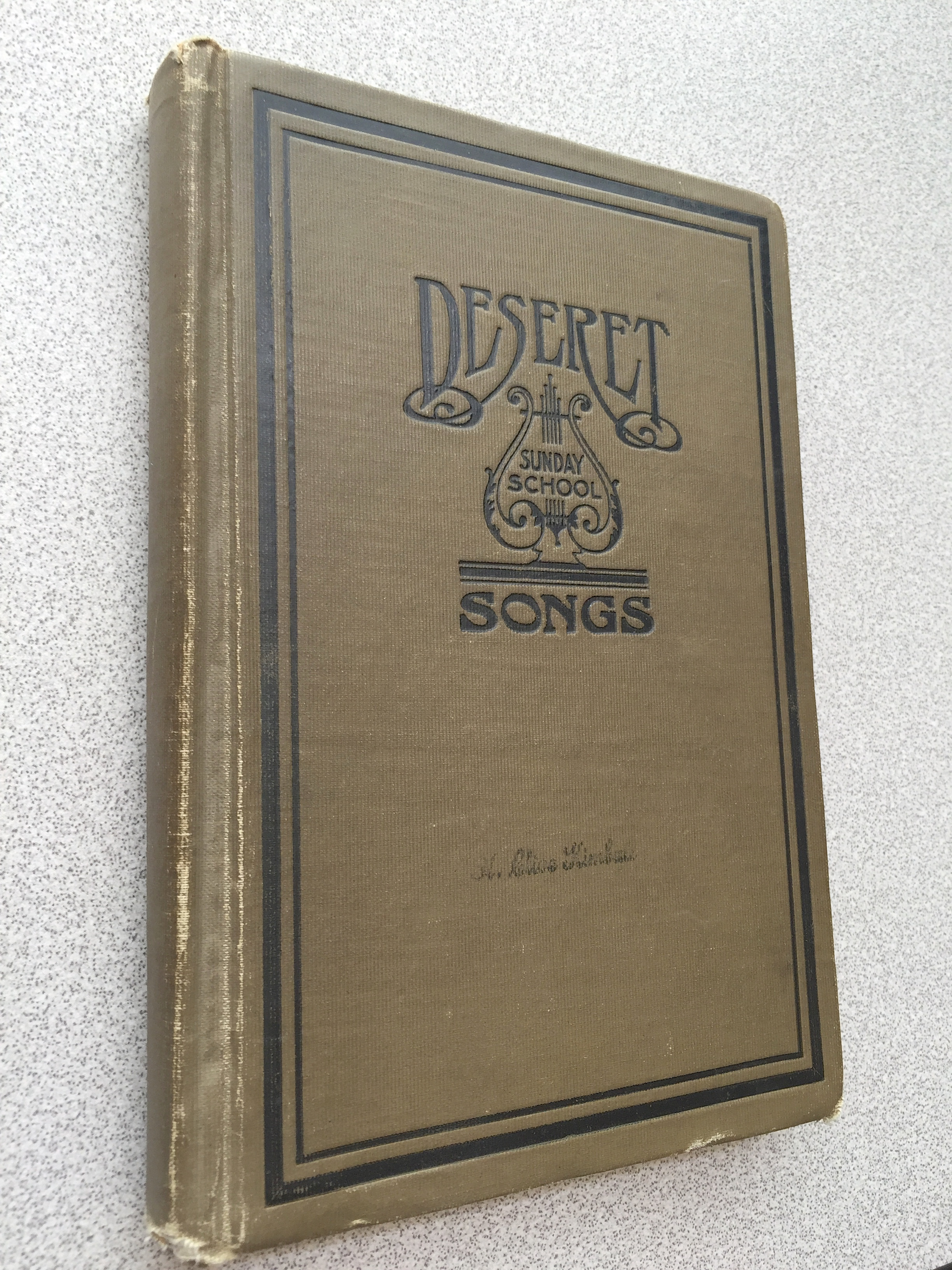
1909 Deseret Sunday School Songs

Before correlation, the church auxiliaries were free to publish their own curricula and hymnbooks. The Deseret Sunday School Union published a series of songbooks beginning in the late 1884. Many of the songs in these early Sunday School songbooks were intended for use with youth and followed the "gospel song" style of bouncy rhythms, repeated pitches, a verse-chorus pattern, melodramatic metaphor, and a tendency to focus on exhortation to the singers. These songbooks were extremely popular and introduced such favorites as "Oh, How Lovely Was the Morning" (now known as "Joseph Smith's First Prayer"), "Improve the Shining Moments", and "Choose the Right".

A new edition of the Sunday School songbook entitled Deseret Sunday School Songs was published in 1909. Following the format of the Songs of Zion hymnbook, it was expanded and printed with two-staff notation instead of the three-staff format of the Psalmody. Deseret Sunday School Songs outlasted the Psalmody, being used in the LDS Church until 1948. It was much more popular because the tunes were more "singable". Of the 295 hymns in the Deseret Sunday School Songs, 120 still appear in the 1985 Latter-day Saint hymnal.

== 1927 hymnal ==
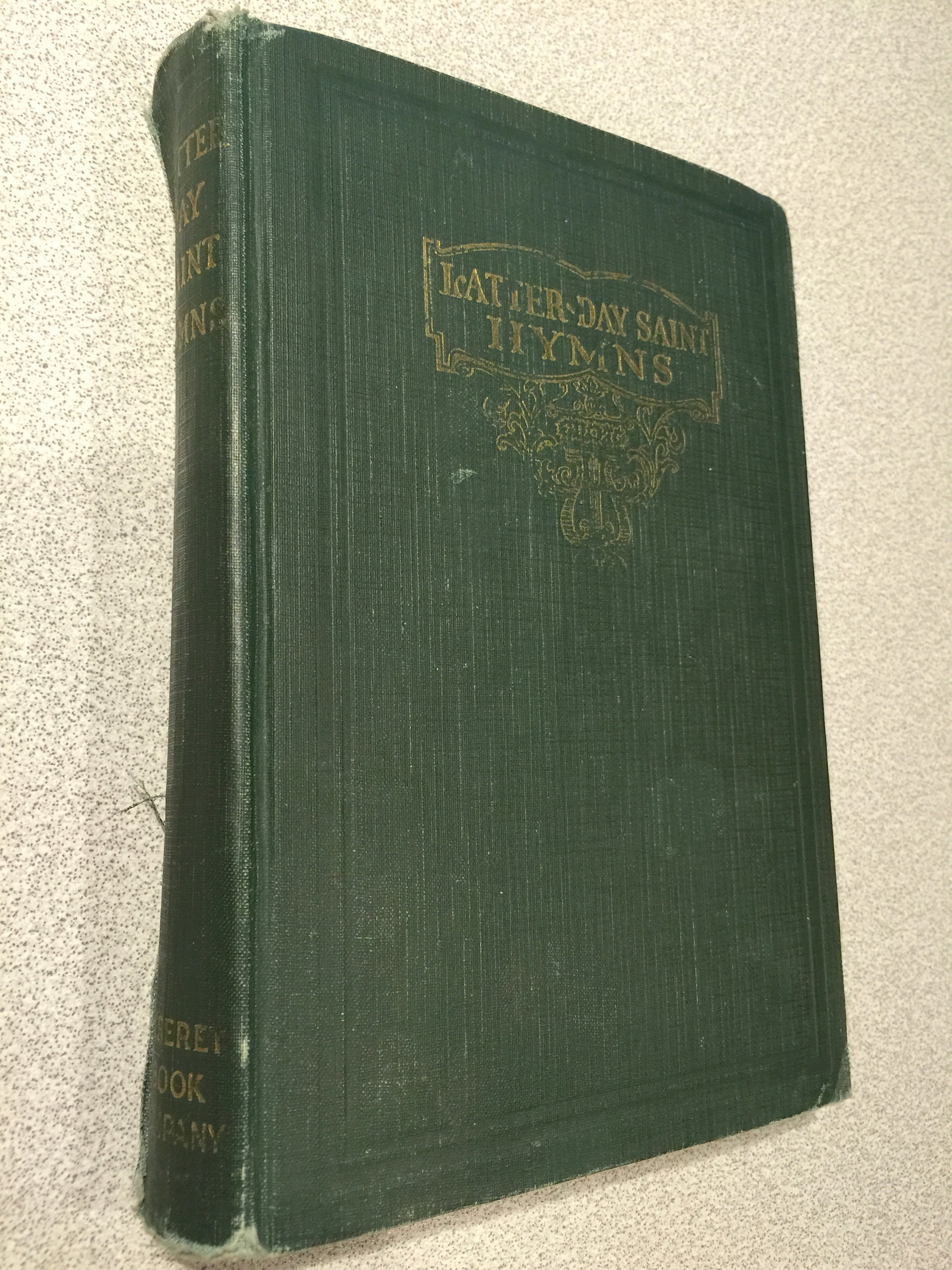
1927 LDS Hymnbook 1st Edition

For a brief period in the early 1900s, there were four different hymnbooks in use in the LDS Church:

- The Manchester hymnal
- The Latter-day Saints' Psalmody
- Songs of Zion
- Deseret Sunday School Songs

In 1927, the church's Music Committee decided to combine the best of the first three of these hymnals into one volume. The result was called Latter-day Saint Hymns, though it was commonly called "the green hymnbook". It contained 419 hymns, of which 128 still survive in the church's 1985 hymnal. Although it tried to incorporate some aspects of the Songs of Zion and the Deseret Sunday School Songs, it still heavily emphasized difficult and elaborate hymns for use in choirs and was never as popular as the books it was meant to replace. The Deseret Sunday School Songs continued as a separate hymnal until 1948 because it was used in Sunday School opening exercises.

By December 1928, a slightly revised version of the 1927 hymnal was released. The 1928 edition included 421 hymns, 5 of which were new.

== 1948–1950 hymnals ==
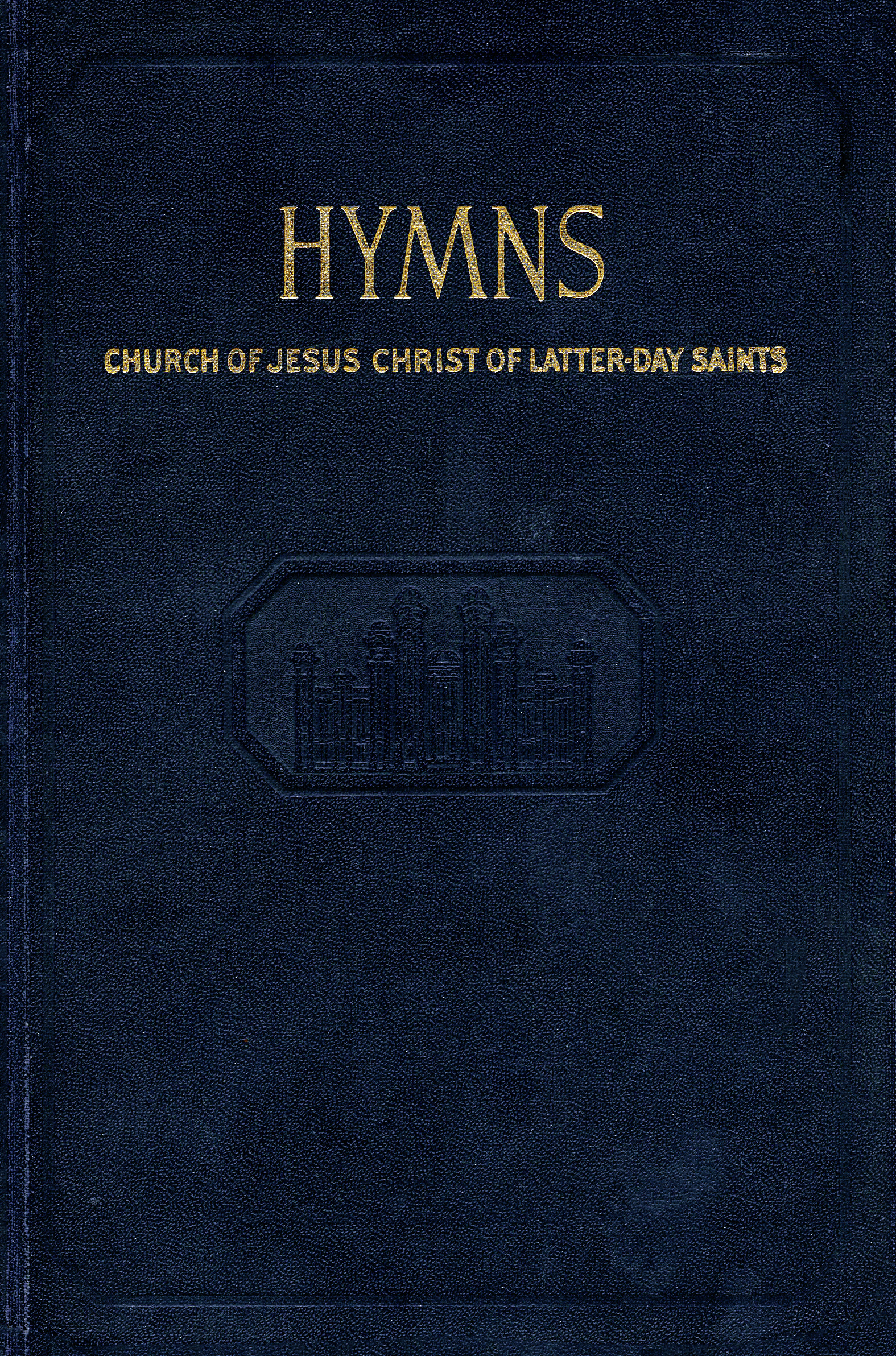
1948 LDS Hymnbook

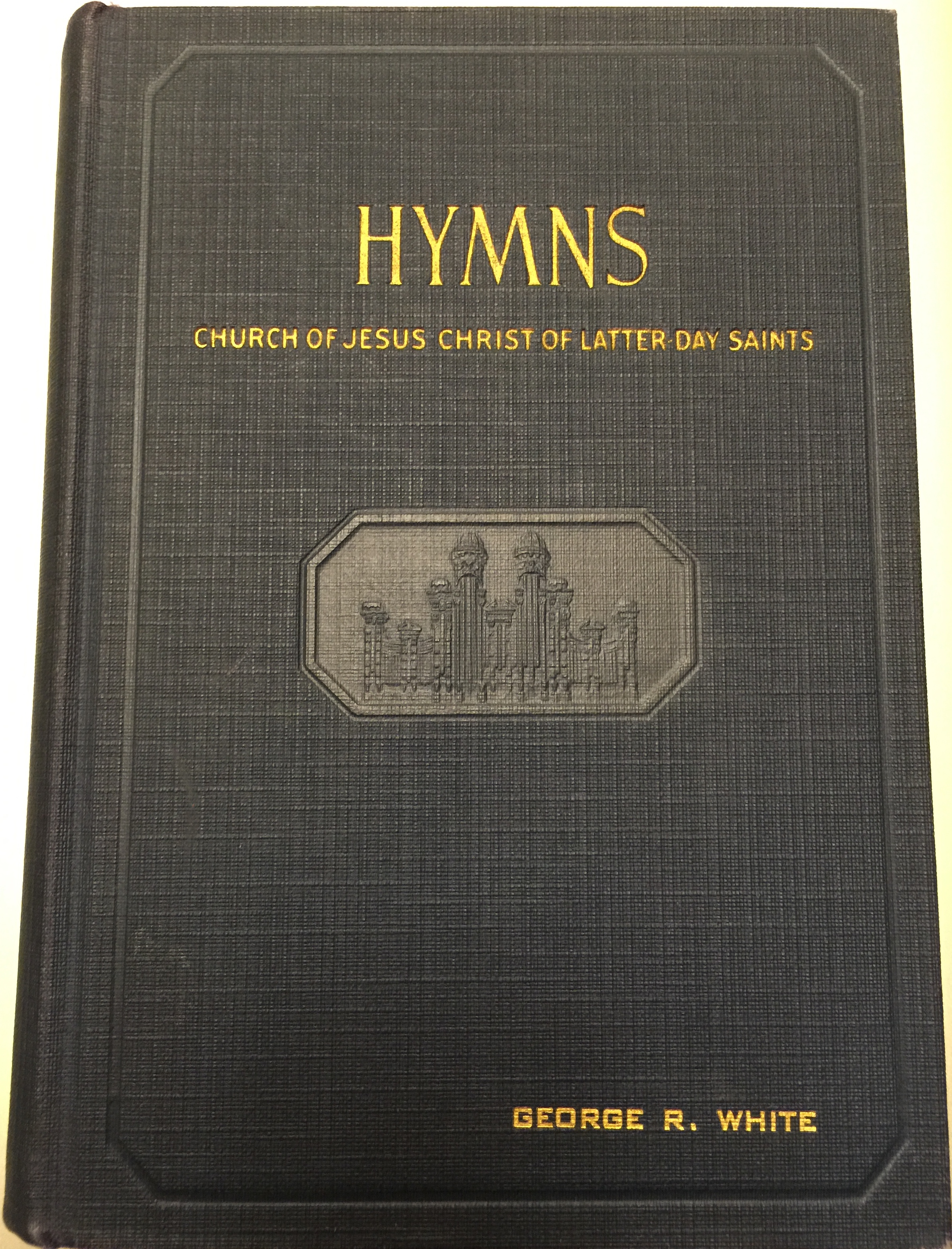
1950 LDS Hymnbook

In 1948, a new hymnbook that replaced both the 'Latter-day Saint Hymns' (1927 hymnbook) and the Deseret Sunday School Songs was published under the title Hymns: The Church of Jesus Christ of Latter-day Saints. The 1948 edition included 387 hymns.

While previous LDS hymnbooks focused on emphasizing music and texts written by Latter-day Saints, the committee that compiled this hymnbook turned more to classical Protestant sources for inspiration. They were also influenced by the research and writings of Sterling Wheelwright, who felt that LDS hymnals were losing their relevance through focusing on upbeat but trivial hymns rather than intimate and meditative ones. Overall, they sought to publish a hymnbook with a "better standard of musical expression" than previous LDS hymnals.

Problems with binding and complaints from church leaders about the loss of some gospel songs led to the Church Music Committee issuing a slightly revised version in 1950.

== 1985 hymnal ==
In 1985, the church issued a new hymn book titled Hymns of The Church of Jesus Christ of Latter-day Saints. The English edition contains 341 hymns.

Some new hymns were placed in this book, which had not been published by the worldwide church up until this time, such as "Called to Serve" and "How Great Thou Art," as well as familiar songs that have been used in the Primary such as "I Am a Child of God," "Teach Me To Walk In The Light," and "Families Can Be Together Forever."

Others were left out of the book. Committee members have rarely given specific reasons for leaving out any particular hymn, usually saying that the Holy Spirit was followed in the selection and there were too many hymns to be included into one book. For example, some of the hymns were about Utah and its mountains, which, while meaningful to church members living there, would not be as appealing to a worldwide church. Others, such as "Come Thou Fount of Every Blessing", were thought to have fallen into disuse, but were missed by some members.

Of the ninety hymns included in the 1835 edition, twenty-six still survive in some form in the current 1985 LDS hymnal.

This 1985 hymnal was reprinted in 1998 and 2002 with some modifications to renew copyrights, new copyright dates, and other items such as composer death dates.

Numerous translations have been made of the 1985 LDS hymnal for use around the world. The translated hymnbooks are generally about 200 hymns in size, with approximately 100 hymns that are required to be included in all LDS hymnals, 50 chosen from a suggested list in the English hymnbook, and 50 that are left open to the translation committee to choose. Usually the last 50 are mostly chosen from the English hymnbook with some differences in Christmas music, national anthems, a few hymns from previous editions of LDS hymnals that are not in the current English edition, and occasionally other hymns popular in the relevant linguistic regions. For example, in the Spanish translation, three hymns originally written by Latter-day Saints in Spanish are included ( “¿Por qué somos?” by Edmund W. Richardson, “Despedida” or “Placentero nos es trabajar” by Andrés C. González, and “La voz, ya, del eterno” or “¡La Proclamación!” by José V. Estrada G.), along with others taken from earlier hymnals or other sources. In total, there are 209 additional hymns found only in various non-English language editions.

== Hymns—for Home and Church ==
In June 2018, the LDS Church announced that it would be compiling a new hymnal and children's songbook. Specific goals of the new books are to create unity in hymn numbers around the world, provide opportunities to include more hymns and songs originating in languages other than English, fill doctrinal gaps, resolve copyright issues from foreign translation restrictions, improve the quality of translations, and provide more consistent digital access to the songs and hymns.

Prior to its October 2023 general conference, the church released details about the new music. The hymnbook and children's songbook will be consolidated into a single volume, featuring about 375 selections. New selections for the hymnbook started being released in 2024, with the new music book now titled Hymns—for Home and Church. As of October 29, 2026, 90 new hymns have been released and are available on the LDS Church's website.

Part of the hymnbook will also constitute a "core collection" of hymns or songs taken from the current volumes. The completed new hymnbook is expected to be released by the end of 2026 in English, French, Spanish, and Portuguese, with a plan to publish in at least 50 total languages by 2030.

== Changes in hymn tunes ==
Early LDS hymnbooks had no tunes, and the chorister was expected to select a tune that matched the meter and mood of the hymn text. It was not always expected that the congregation sing the text with the same tune each time. Even after music was printed with the hymn texts, however, the tunes used with each hymn text have changed from time to time in Latter-day Saint hymnbooks. For example, of the twenty-six hymns in the 1985 hymnal that were included in the 1835 hymnbook, only five of the original hymns are probably still sung to their original tunes. These are:

| FIRST LINE | HYMN NUMBER |
|---|---|
| Redeemer of Israel | (1835 #6; 1985 #6) |
| Joy to the World | (1835 #15; 1985 #201) |
| This Earth Was Once a Garden Place | (1835 #23; 1985 #49) |
| From Greenland's Icy Mountains | (1835 #74; 1985 #268) |
| O God! Our Help in Ages Past | (1835 #86; 1985 #31) |

Even among these, "Joy to the World" has been included in Latter-day Saint hymnbooks with at least two different tunes over the years. Some examples of iconic Latter-day Saint hymns that are sung to different hymn tunes than they were originally include "Praise to the Man," "An Angel From on High," and "If You Could Hie to Kolob".

Revivals of the old tunes in recordings of traditional Mormon hymns have generated interest and appreciation, as in the "Return to Nauvoo" collection by the FiddleSticks group and the "Parley P Pratt" collection by Roger Hoffman.

== Contemporary hymns ==
Many of the LDS Church's hymns are well known traditional Christian hymns; others deal with items of doctrine unique to the church's doctrine, such as the pre-mortal existence, modern church prophets, and the Book of Mormon. Others draw their subject matter from the church's history, including themes such as the restoration and pioneer experiences. Some of the unique LDS hymns such as "Come, Come, Ye Saints" are gaining popularity in the repertoires of other Christian choirs.

The Primary has its own songs, included in the Children's Songbook. Some of these songs are gaining popularity with adults as well.

Some other songs which are occasionally sung by choirs, (though usually not by the whole congregation in a meeting) include "O Divine Redeemer" and the Christmas carol "O Holy Night".

Other hymns continue to be written by Latter-day Saints, some of which have grown in popularity. For example, "Faith in Every Footstep", a song specifically written for the 150th anniversary of the Mormon pioneers' journey, is sung occasionally in LDS sacrament meetings and has been included in some translations of the 1985 LDS hymnbook. "If the Savior Stood Beside Me" was another new hymn that is among the most-requested hymns in a survey about the forthcoming hymnbook.

Congregations also sing patriotic hymns of their respective countries, as they may or may not be included in the language-specific edition of the hymn book.

== See also ==
- List of English-language hymnals by denomination
- Category:Latter Day Saint hymnals
