= Joseph Philbrick Webster =

American songwriter

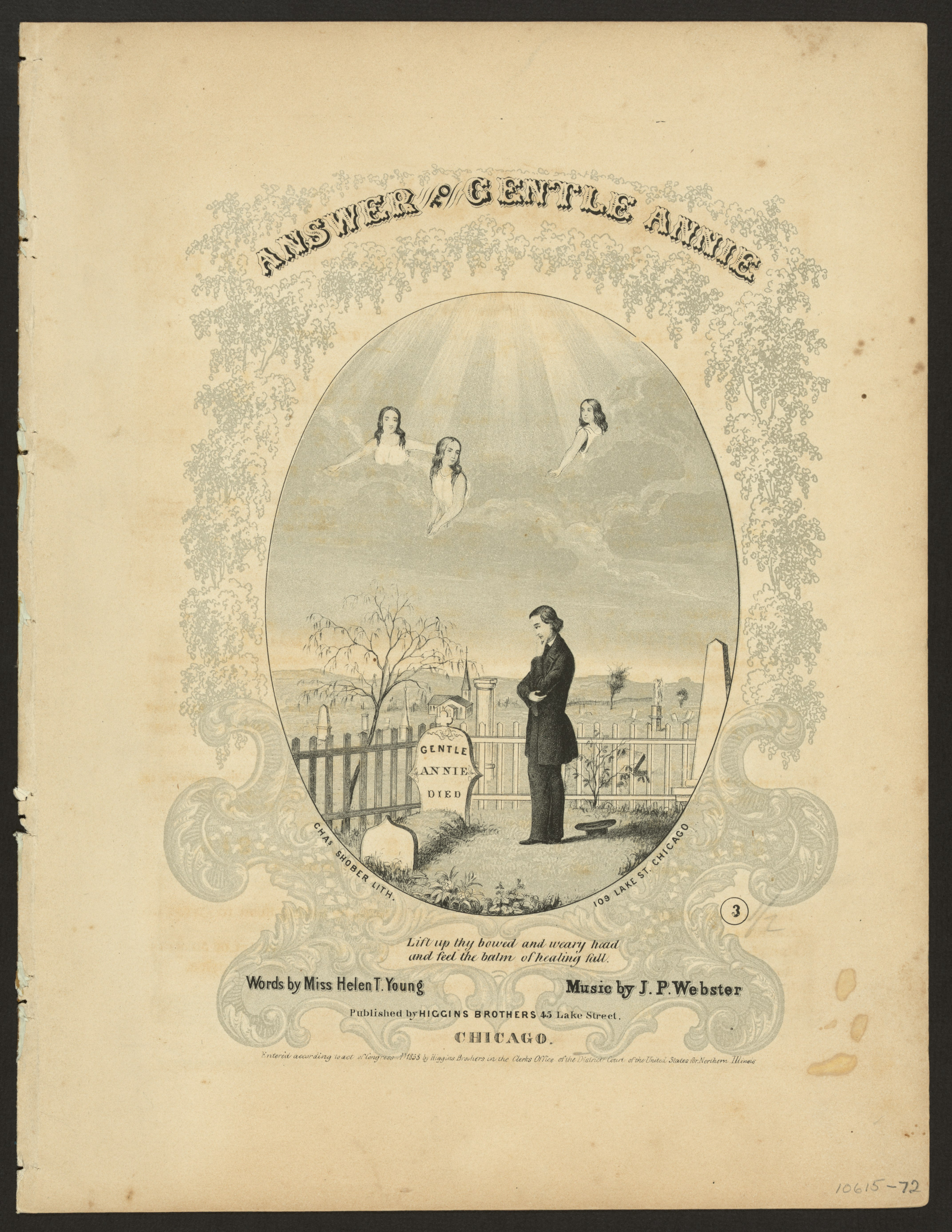
Answer to Gentle Annie

Joseph Philbrick Webster, also known as J.P. Webster (February 18, 1819 – January 18, 1875), was an American songwriter and composer most notable for his musical compositions during the antebellum and American Civil War points of United States history, and his post-war hymns.

Among his most notable works are the ballad "Lorena" (1857), often considered the most popular song of the American Civil War (on both sides), "I'll Twine 'Mid the Ringlets" (written in 1860 and later called "Wildwood Flower") and "In the Sweet By and By" (1868), one of the best-known Christian hymns in American history.

== Life and works ==
J.P. Webster was born in Manchester, New Hampshire on February 22, 1819. From an early age, he expressed an interest and talent in music, and went on to study with distinguished composers such as Lowell Mason and George James Webb, including a three-year course of study beginning in 1840 in Boston. Afterwards, he travelled extensively throughout the Eastern United States as a concert singer, including notable stays in New York City and Madison, Indiana, where he performed with the famous "Swedish Nightingale" Jenny Lind, as his pianist. After years of travel, Webster eventually settled in Racine, Wisconsin.

Sometime before 1859, Webster developed what was commonly called "Lake Michigan Throat", a severe form of bronchitis, forcing him to abandon his singing career and move himself, and by then a wife and children, further south and away from the lake to Elkhorn, Wisconsin. No longer having the strength in his voice for singing, Webster turned his attention to composing music. This was a passion that would produce over 1,000 songs, including music for ballads, hymns, patriotic drama, and a cantata.

During the Civil War years, Webster taught and composed a variety of songs related to the war. He also participated as a drill sergeant for the Elkhorn "Wide Awakes", whose role was to act as the local home guard. As the war began to close, Webster returned his focus to writing ballads and hymns. Around this time, he also opened what was considered a "respectable saloon", that attracted young literary men of the town with which he would have future musical collaborations. One of these young men was Sanford Fillmore Bennett, who would later write the lyrics for "In the Sweet By and By".

Webster remained in Elkhorn until his death on January 18, 1875, at the age of 55. He is buried at the Hazel Ridge Cemetery in Elkhorn, where his epitaph reads, "Joseph P. Webster. In the Sweet By and By We Shall Meet". His former residence is now the home of the Walworth County Historical Society, which acts as a museum to both Webster and thousands of Civil War era antiques and unique items.
