= Stephen M. Jones =

American composer & musicologist (1960-)

Stephen M. Jones (born 1960) is an American professor of music composition at Brigham Young University (BYU) and former Dean of the BYU College of Fine Arts and Communications. Among his works is the music for the hymn "When Faith Endures", which is included in the current English-language edition of the LDS hymnal. His chamber, choral and orchestral music has been commissioned and performed by the Chicago Symphony, the Utah Symphony, the Utah Arts Festival, the Beijing Modern Music Festival, The Tabernacle Choir at Temple Square, and many others.

Jones is a Latter-day Saint. He resides in American Fork, Utah, with his wife, Wendy.

Jones also did the music for the film Eliza and I, jointly produced by KBYU-TV and Richard Dutcher's Zion Films in 1997.
