= Stephen L. Roth =

American judge

Stephen L. Roth is a judge on the Utah Court of Appeals. Roth was appointed to the Utah Court of Appeals by Governor Gary R. Herbert in March 2010. Herbert stated, "In his almost eight years as a trial court judge, Judge Roth has distinguished himself as an intelligent and hardworking public servant with a well-deserved reputation for fairness and integrity." Roth received his Juris Doctor degree from the J. Reuben Clark Law School at Brigham Young University in 1977. Roth was appointed to a judgeship with the Third District Court by Governor Michael O. Leavitt in 2002. Roth retired from the Utah Court of Appeals on August 1, 2017.
